= List of szlachta =

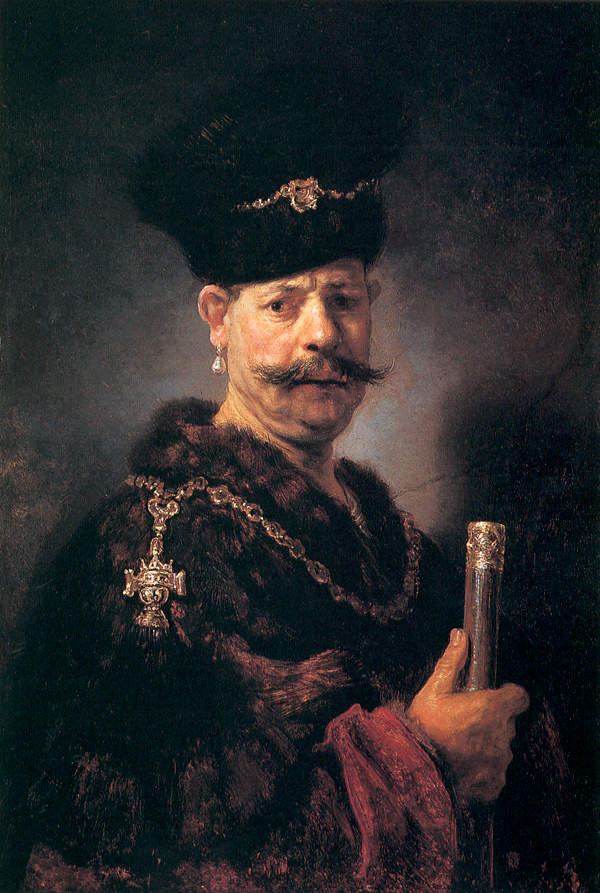
Polish Nobleman, by Rembrandt, 1637

The szlachta (Polish: szlachta, [ˈʂlaxta]) was a privileged social class in the Kingdom of Poland. The term szlachta was also used for the Lithuanian nobility after the union of the Grand Duchy of Lithuania with Poland as the Polish–Lithuanian Commonwealth (Union of Lublin, 1569) and for the increasingly Polonized nobilities of territories controlled by the Polish–Lithuanian Commonwealth, including Ducal Prussia and the Ruthenian lands.

The Polish–Lithuanian Commonwealth was a semi-confederated, semi-federated monarchic republic from 1569 until 1795, comprising the Kingdom of Poland and the Grand Duchy of Lithuania. The head of state was an elected monarch. The Commonwealth's dominant social class was the nobility. This article chiefly lists the nobility's magnate segment (the wealthier nobility), as they were the most prominent, famous, and notable. These families would receive non-hereditary 'central' and Land dignities and titles under the Commonwealth law that forbade (with minor exceptions) any hereditary legal distinctions within the peerage. They would later be 'approximated' to honorary hereditary titles in the Partition period with little real-power privileges but would still be venerated among the Polish upper class and the rest of the society as 'senatorial', 'palatinal', 'castellanial' or "dignitarial' families.

"Szlachta" is the proper term for Polish nobility beginning about the 15th century. Most powerful members of szlachta were known as magnates ("magnaci" or the "magnateria" class). A Polish nobleman who lived earlier is referred to as a "rycerz" ("knight"); the class of all such individuals is the "rycerstwo" (the "chivalry" class). Most powerful members of "rycerstwo" were known as "możnowładcy" (the "moznowładztwo" class).

== By family ==
Below is a list of most important Polish noble (szlachta) families. The families listed are the famous magnates families - ones that had accumulated great wealth and political power, generally preserved across several centuries. Please note that this list is not intended to be a comprehensive list of all szlachta families. For the list of lesser known but still notable Polish noble families, see the corresponding category

All names are given first in the singular, then (parenthetically) in the plural.

- Borkowski (Borkowscy)
- Chodkiewicz (Chodkiewiczowie)
- Czartoryski (Czartoryscy)
- Gorczewski (Gorczewscy)
- Lanckoroński (Lanckorońscy)
- Litwicki (Litwiccy)
- Lubomirski (Lubomirscy)
- Mielzynski (Mielzynscy) .
- Odrowąż (Odrowąż – herb szlachecki)
- Ogiński (Ogińscy)
- Ostrogski (Ostrogscy)
- Ostroróg (Ostrorogowie)
- Pac (Pacowie)
- Poniatowski (Poniatowscy)
- Potocki (Potoccy)
- Radziwiłł (Radziwiłłowie)
- Rzewuski (Rzewuscy herbu Krzwyda)
- Sapieha (Sapiehowie)
- Sanguszko (Sanguszkowie)
- Skarzynski
- Tarnowski (Tarnowscy)
- Tęczyński (Tęczyńscy)
- Tyszkiewicz (Tyszkiewiczowie)
- Wiśniowiecki (Wiśniowieccy)
- Zamoyski (Zamoyscy)
- Żeleński (Żeleńscy)

== By year of birth ==
Listed below are prominent szlachta of Poland and the Grand Duchy of Lithuania, by century and year of birth.

In many cases, birth year is uncertain or unknown. Under the Commonwealth, most people—including szlachta—paid little attention to their birth dates.

=== 15th century ===
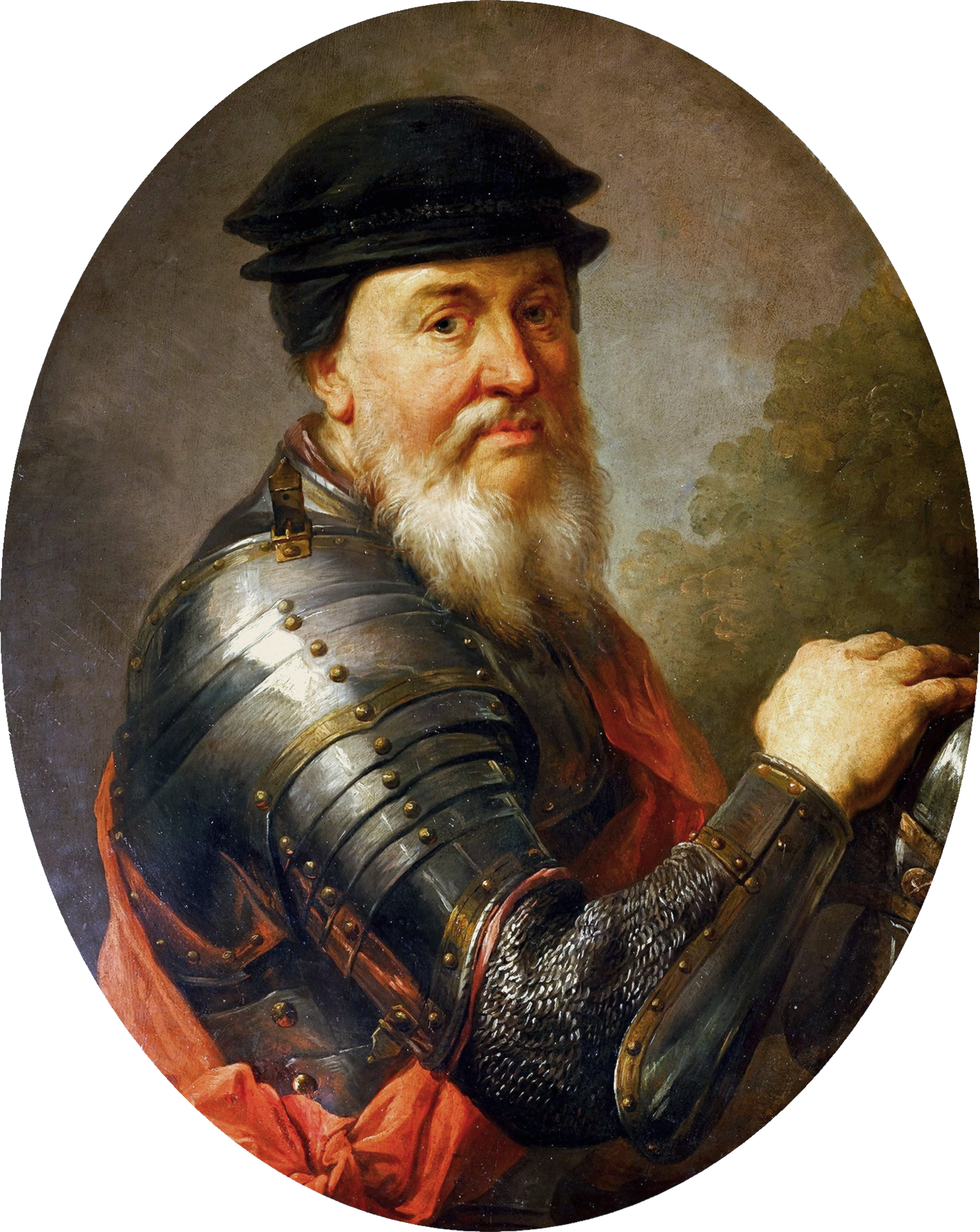
Jan Amor Tarnowski

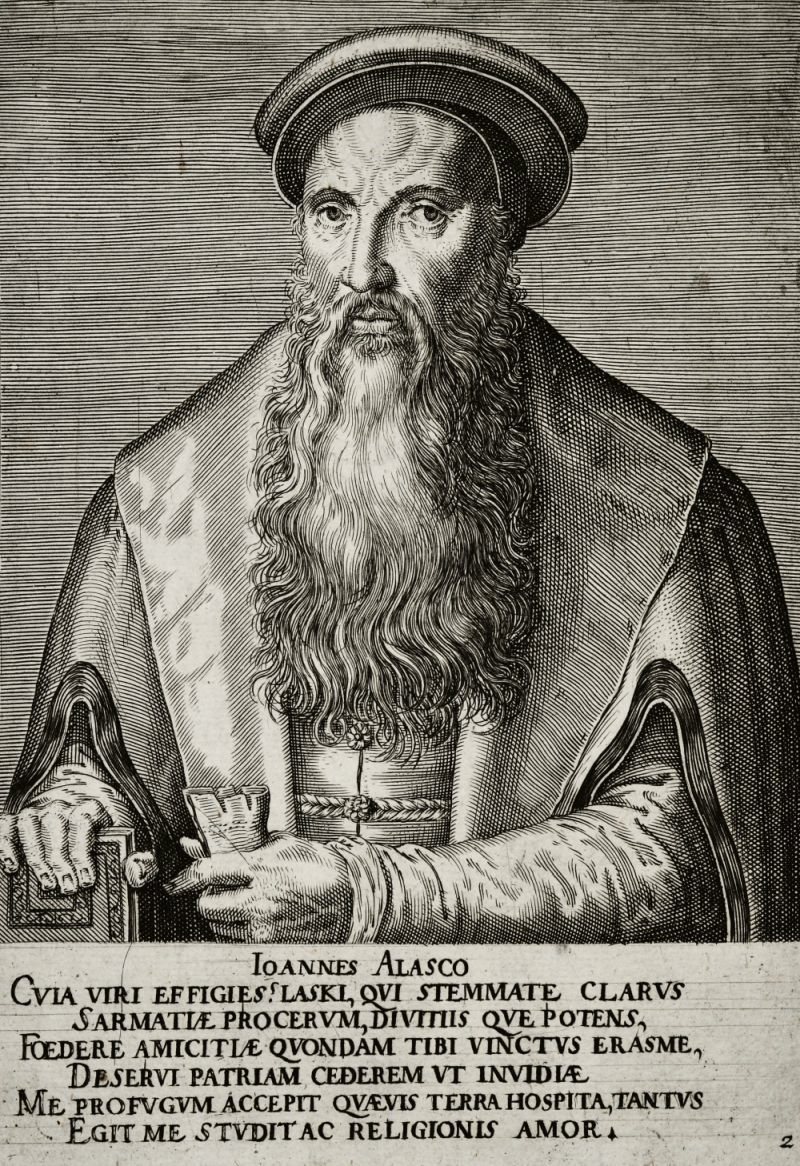
Jan Łaski

- Wojciech Jastrzębiec (Jastrzebski) 1362-1436 Archbishop of Gneizno
- Jan Skarzynski, 1400s, Nobleman
- Peter Hussakowski (Ussakowski) 1448, Nobleman
- Jan Scibor Taczanowski, 15th century-1468, voivode
- Jan Tarnowski, 1488–1561, hetman
- Jan Lubrański, 1456–1520, bishop
- Jan Łaski, 1456–1531, primate, archbishop
- Mikołaj Kamieniecki, 1460–1515, hetman
- Konstanty Ostrogski, 1460–1530, hetman
- Krzysztof Szydłowiecki, 1467–1532, chancellor
- Michał Gliński, 1470–1534, prince
- Jan Feliks "Szram" Tarnowski, 1471–1507, castellan, voivode
- Jan Stawicki, 1473–1510, voivode, starost of Didnia
- Jan "Ciężki" Tarnowski, 1479–1527, castellan, starost
- Tiedemann Giese, 1480–1560, bishop
- Barbara Kola, 1480–1560
- Jerzy Radziwiłł, 1480–1541, hetman, voivode, castellan, marshal
- Jan Tęczyński, 1485–1553, Court Marshall
- Piotr Gamrat, 1487–1545, bishop
- Stanisław Kostka, 1487–1555, castellan, podskarbi
- Jan Łaski, 1499–1560, philosopher
- Barbara Kiszka, 15th century-1513
- Mikołaj Firlej, 15th century-1526, voivode, hetman
- Nicolaus Wasilewski 1489-1542 Nobleman
- Andrzej Tarło, 15th century-1531, chorąży
- Jan Tarło, 15th century-1550, krajczy, podczaszy, cześnik
- Piotr Firlej, 15th century-1553, voivode
- Mikołaj Mielecki, 15th century-1585, hetman, voivode
- Petraszka Lanevicz-Mylski 15th century, nobleman

=== 16th century ===
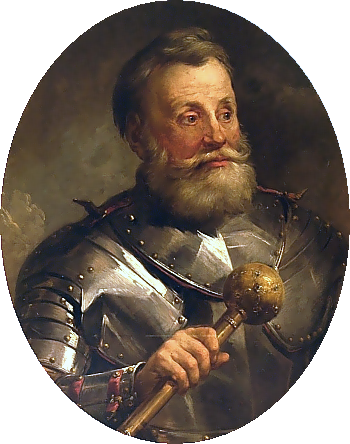
Jan Karol Chodkiewicz

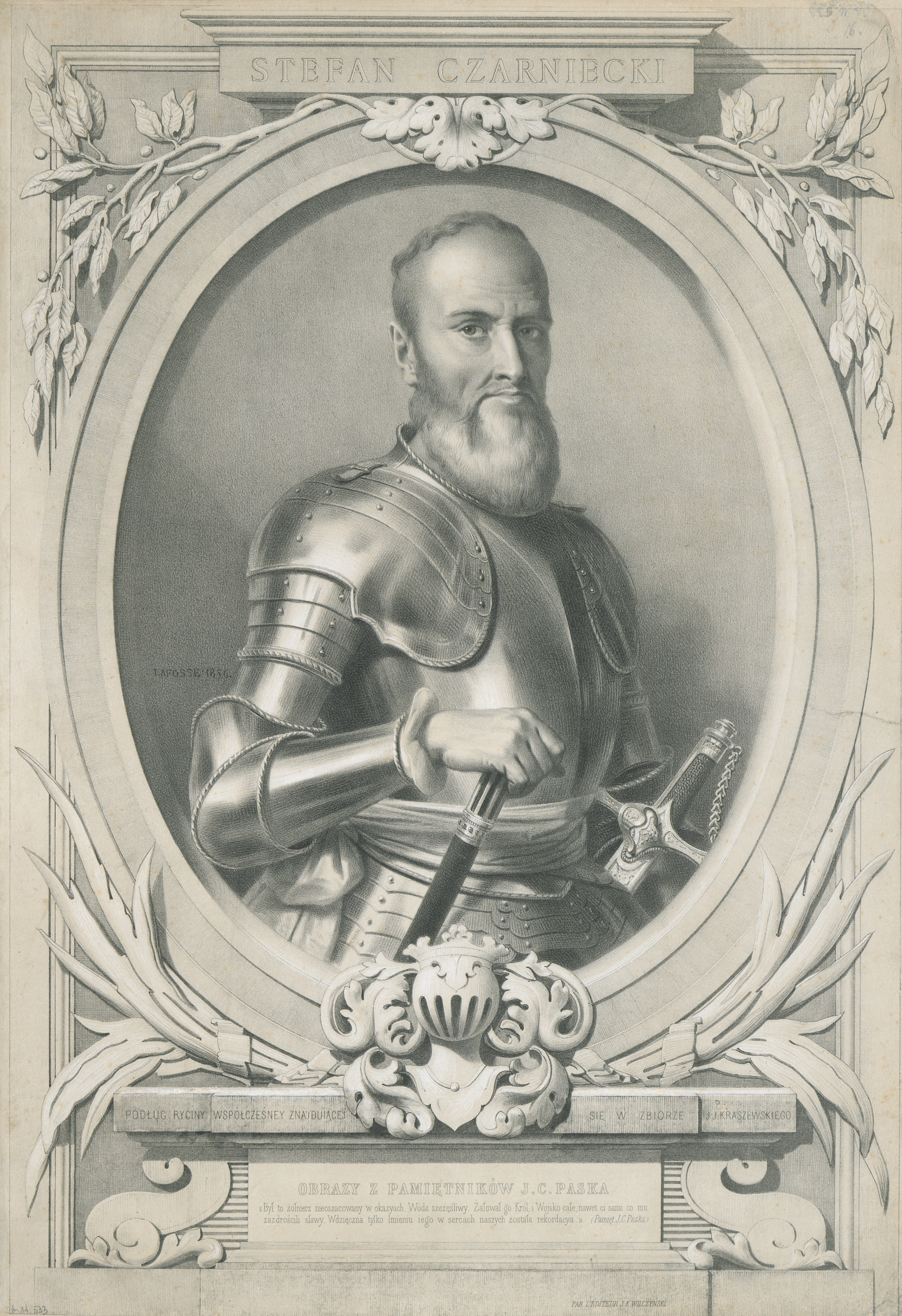
Stefan Czarniecki

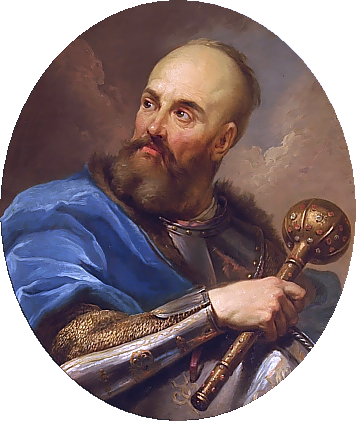
Stanisław Rewera Potocki

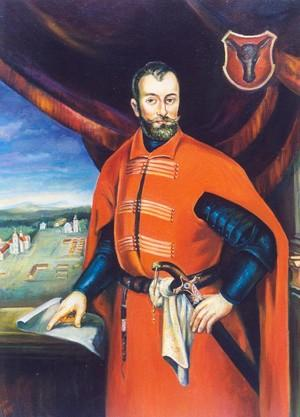
Mikołaj Spytek Ligęza

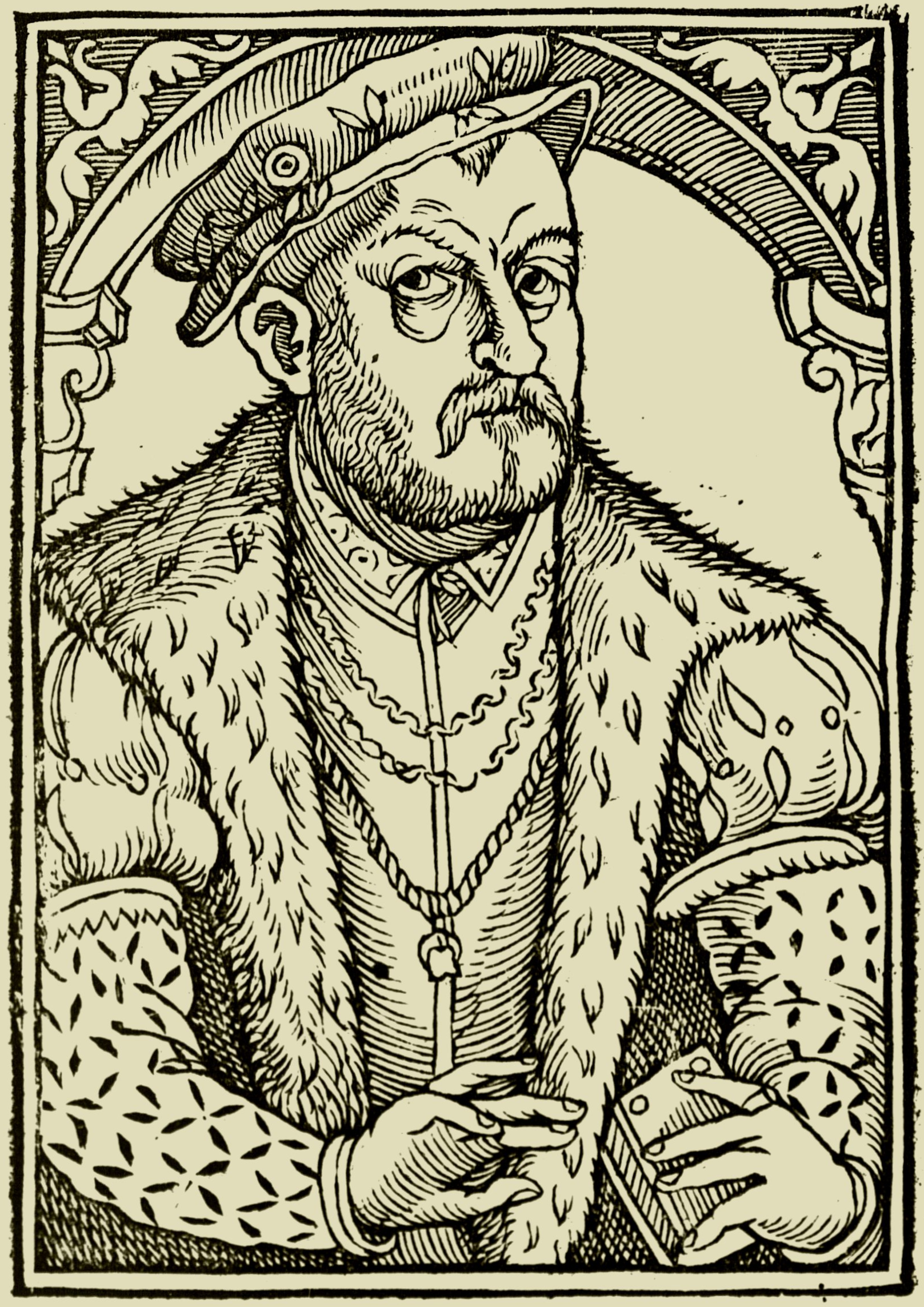
Mikołaj Rej

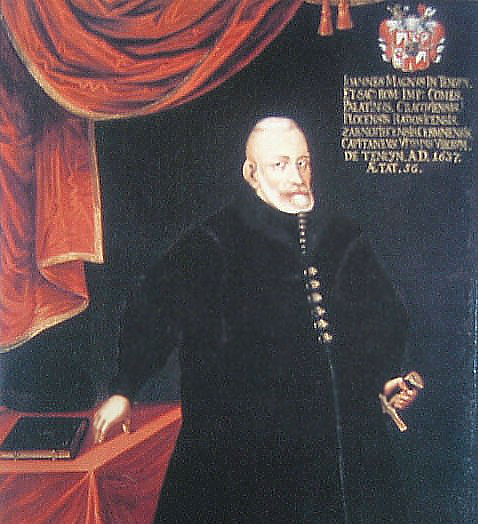
Jan Magnus Tęczyński

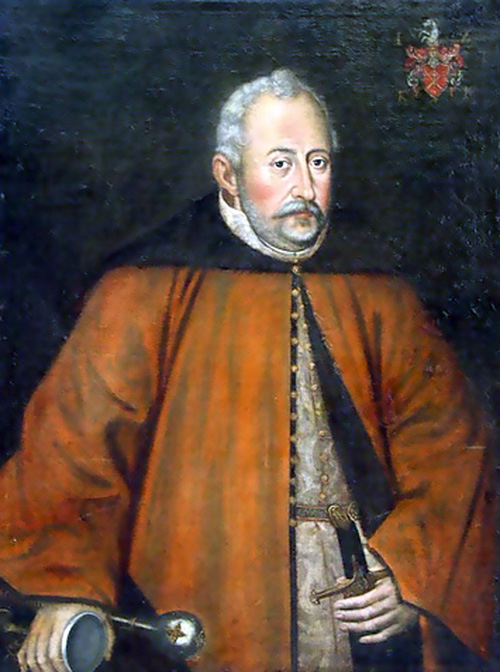
Jan Zamoyski

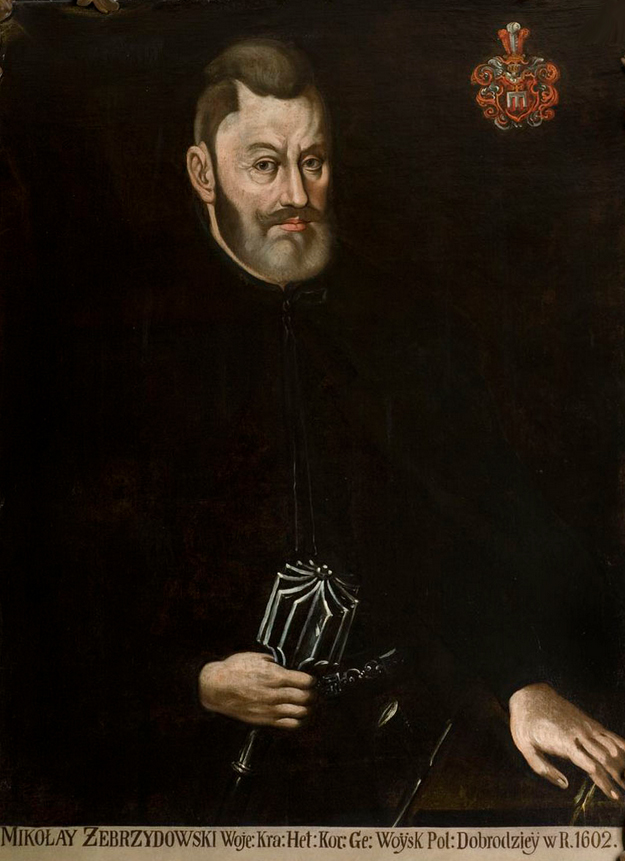
Mikołaj Zebrzydowski

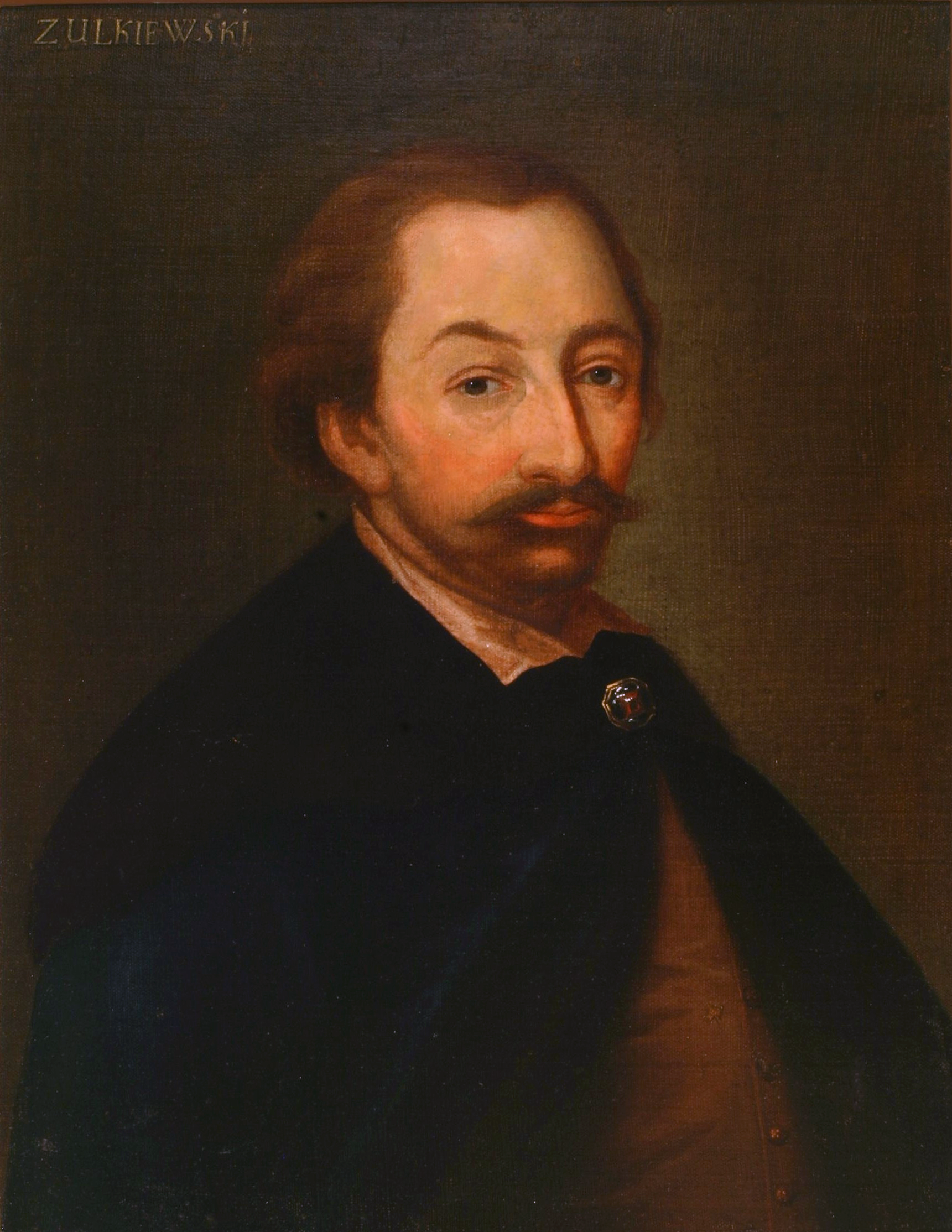
Stanisław Żółkiewski

- Andrzej Frycz Modrzewski (ca. 1503–1572) scholar, humanist and theologian
- Mikołaj Rej, 1505–1568, writer
- Stanisław Odrowąż, 1509–1545, castellan, voivode
- Jerzy Jazłowiecki, 1510–1575, hetman
- Marcin Kromer, 1512–1589, Prince-Bishop
- Mikołaj "the Red" Radziwiłł, 1512–1584, hetman, kanclerz (chancellor)
- Mikołaj "the Black" Radziwiłł, 1515–1565, marshal, chancellor, palatine
- Barbara Radziwiłł, 1520–1550, queen
- Jan Firlej, 1521–1574, marshall, starost
- Konstanty Wasyl Ostrogski, 1526–1608, voivode
- Radziwill Butwilowicz, 1526
- Jan Tarło, 1527–1587, castellan, voivode
- Michał Wiśniowiecki, 1529–1584, castellan
- Jan Kostka, 1529–1581, voivode
- Grzegorz Branicki, c.1534–1595, łowczy of Kraków, starost of Niepołomice
- Zofia Tarnowska, 1534–1570
- Jan Krzysztof Tarnowski, 1537–1567, castellan
- Sebastian Lubomirski, 1539–1613, castellan
- Zofia Odrowąż, 1540–1580
- Jan Opaliński, 1546–1598
- Mikołaj VII Radziwiłł, 1546–1589, chamberlain
- Krzysztof Mikołaj "the Lightning" Radziwiłł, 1547–1603, hetman
- Stanisław Żółkiewski, 1547–1620, hetman, catellan, chancellor
- Mikołaj Krzysztof "the Orphan" Radziwiłł, 1549–1616, voivode
- Marek Sobieski, 1549–1605, voivode
- Stanisław Kostka, 1550–1568, saint
- Jan Tarnowski, 1550–1605, archbishop
- Stanisław Stadnicki, 1551–1610
- Jan Kiszka, 1552–1592
- Andrzej Leszczyński, 1553–1606, starost of Nakło, voivode of Brześć Kujawski
- Mikołaj Zebrzydowski, 1553–1620, voivode
- Janusz Ostrogski, 1554–1620, castellan, voivode
- Adam Sędziwój Czarnkowski, 1555–1628, voivode
- Jan Zbigniew Ossoliński, 1555–1628, King's secretary
- Aleksander Koniecpolski, 1555–1609, voivode
- Jerzy Radziwiłł, 1556–1600, bishop
- Lew Sapieha, 1557–1633, hetman, voivode
- Stanisław Krasiński, 1558–1617, voivode
- Jan Karol Chodkiewicz, 1560–1621, hetman
- Katarzyna Ostrogska, 1560–157
- Krystyna Radziwiłł, 1560–1580
- Mikołaj Spytek Ligęza, 1562–1637, castellan
- Zygmunt Tarło, 1562–1628, castellan
- Marcin Kazanowski, 1563/1566–1636, hetman, chancellor, voivode
- Zygmunt Kazanowski, 1563–1634, starost, courth marshall and chamberlain
- Konstanty Wiśniowiecki, 1564–1641, voivode
- Barbara Tarnowska, 1566–1610
- Adam Wiśniowiecki, 1566–1622
- Jan Szczęsny Herburt, 1567–1616, starost
- Jan Piotr Sapieha, 1569–1611, starosta uświacki, pułkownik królewski
- Janusz Skumin Tyszkiewicz, 1570–1642, voivode, writer
- Aleksander Ostrogski, 1571–1603, voivode
- Daniel Naborowski, 1573–1640, poet
- Jerzy Zbaraski, 1573–1631, castellan
- Anna Kostka, 1575–1635
- Katarzyna Kostka, 1575–1648
- Adam Hieronim Sieniawski, 1576–1616, starost, podczaszy
- Grzegorz IV Radziwiłł, 1578–1613, castellan
- Rafał Leszczyński, 1579–1636, voivode
- Janusz Radziwiłł, 1579–1620, castellan
- Stanisław "Rewera" Potocki, 1579–1667, hetman
- Aleksander Józef Lisowski, 1580–1616, mercenary commander
- Szymon Okolski, 1580–1653, historian, priest
- Jakub Sobieski, 1580/88-1646, voivode
- Krzysztof Zbaraski, 1580–1628, koniuszy, ambassador
- Hieronim Morsztyn, 1581–1623, poet
- Jan Opaliński, 1581–1637, voivode of Poznań
- Łukasz Opaliński, 1581–1654, voivode
- Jan Tęczyński, 1581–1637, voivode of Kraków
- Jakub Zadzik, 1582–1642, bishop and chancellor
- Stanisław Lubomirski, 1583–1649
- Zofia Czeska, 1584–1650, nun
- Piotr Gembicki, 1585–1657, chancellor
- Krzysztof II Radziwiłł, 1585–1640, hetman
- Szymon Starowolski, 1585–1650, priest, writer
- Samuel Korecki, 1586–1622
- Piotr Opaliński, 1586–1624
- Kasper Doenhoff, 1587–1645, voivode
- Krzysztof Ossoliński, 1587–1645, voivode
- Stefan Pac, 1587–1640, chancellor
- Mikołaj Firlej, 1588–1635, wojewoda sandomierski
- Marina Mniszech, 1588–1614
- Samuel Łaszcz, 1588–1649, starosta, (warchoł means brawler, barrator)
- Albrycht Władysław Radziwiłł, 1589–1636, castellan
- Jan Stanisław Sapieha, 1589–1635, Chancellor of Lithuania from 1621–1635, childless
- Stanisław Koniecpolski, 1590/1594–1646, hetman
- Jakub Sobieski, 1590–1646, voivode
- Janusz Tyszkiewicz Łohojski, 1590–1649, voivode
- Andrzej Bobola, 1591–1657, jesuit, martyr, saint
- Zygmunt Karol Radziwiłł, 1591–1642, voivode
- Krzysztof Arciszewski, 1592–1656, General of Artillery
- Mikołaj Ostroróg, 1593–1651, sejm marshal
- Jan Karol Tarło, 1593–1645, castellan
- Aleksander Ludwik Radziwiłł, 1594–1654, voivode
- Bogdan Chmielnicki, 1595–1657, hetman
- Jerzy Ossoliński, 1595–1650, voivode and chancellor
- Mikołaj Potocki, 1595–1651, castellan, hetman
- Albrycht Stanisław Radziwiłł, 1595–1656, chancellor
- Stanisław Lanckoroński, 1597–1657, voivode
- Janusz Wiśniowiecki, 1598–1636, starost, koniuszy
- Adam Kazanowski, 1599–1649
- Stefan Czarniecki, 1599–1665, hetman
- Barbara Lubomirska, 16th century-?
- Paweł Tarło, 16th century-1565, bishop
- Jan Tarło, 16th century-1571
- Samuel Zborowski, 16th century-1584
- Stanisław Lubomirski, 16th century-1585
- Mikołaj Firlej, 16th century-1588
- Krzysztof Kosiński, 16th century-1593
- Jan Tęczyński, 16th century-1583, castellan, podkomorzy
- Stanisław Tarło 16th century-1600, starost
- Mikołaj Firlej, 16th century-1601, wojewoda krakowski
- Fiodor Trubecki, 16th century-1608, prince
- Katarzyna Lubomirska, 16th century-1611
- Jerzy Mniszech. 16th century-1613, voivode
- Michał Wiśniowiecki, 16th century-1616, castellan
- Wigund-Jeronym Trubecki, 16th century-1634, prince
- Henryk Firlej, 16th century-1626, bishop
- Krzysztof Wiesiołowski, 16th century-1637, marshal
- Anna Branicka, 16th century-1639
- Aleksander Korwin Gosiewski, 16th century-1639
- Zofia Krasińska, 16th century-1642
- Katarzyna Potocka, 16th century-1642
- Piotr Trubecki, 16th century-1644, podkomorzy, chamberlain
- Krystyna Lubomirska, 16th century-1645
- Stanisław Kazanowski, 16th century-1648
- Konstancja Ligęza, 16th century-1648
- Krzysztof Chodkiewicz, 16th century-1652, castellan, voivode
- Jan Kazimierz Umiastowski, 16th century - 1659, sejm marshal
- Samuel Twardowski, 16th century (1590s) - 1661, writer

=== 17th century ===
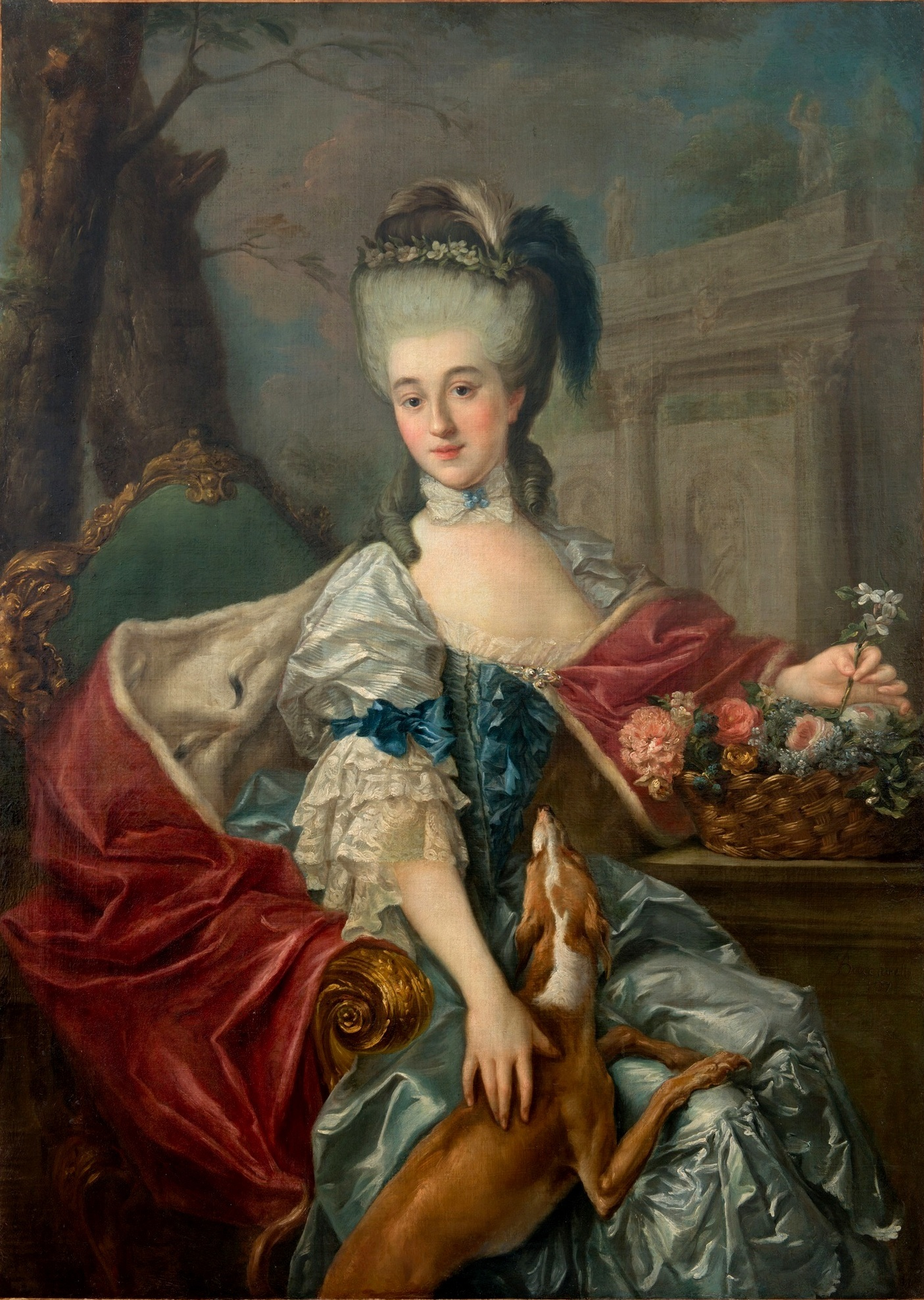
Elżbieta Czartoryska

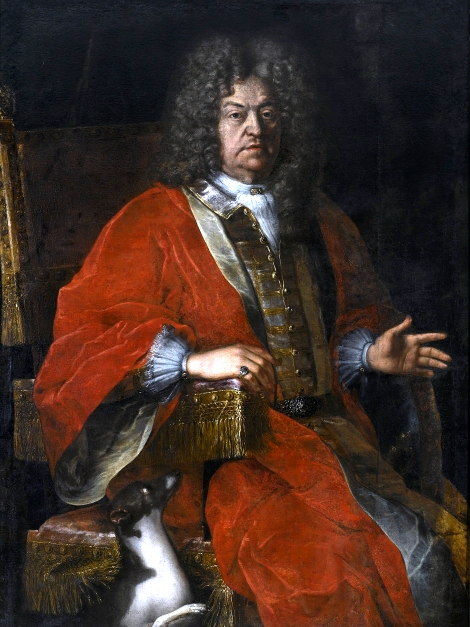
Jan Dobrogost Krasiński

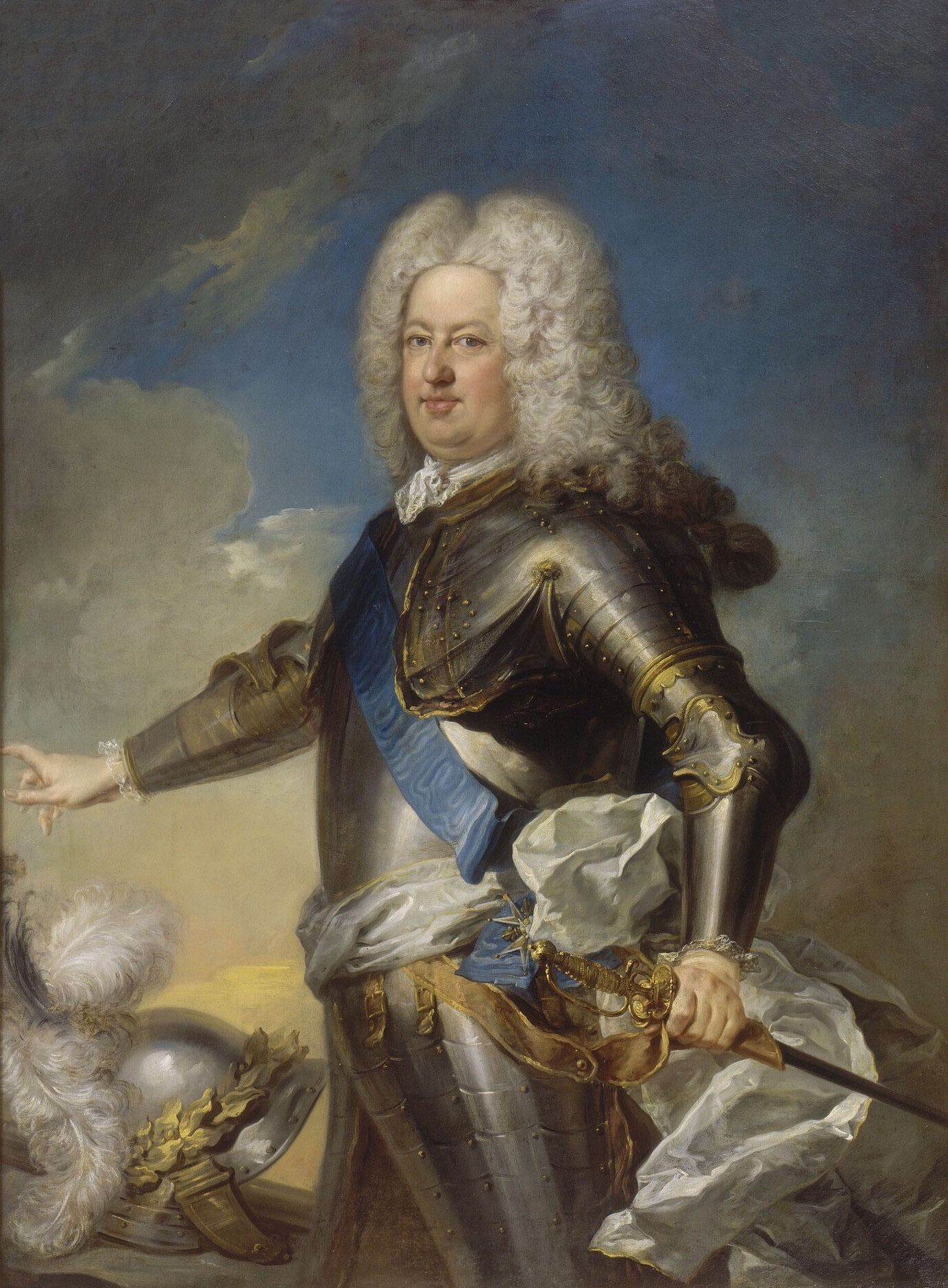
Stanisław I Leszczyński

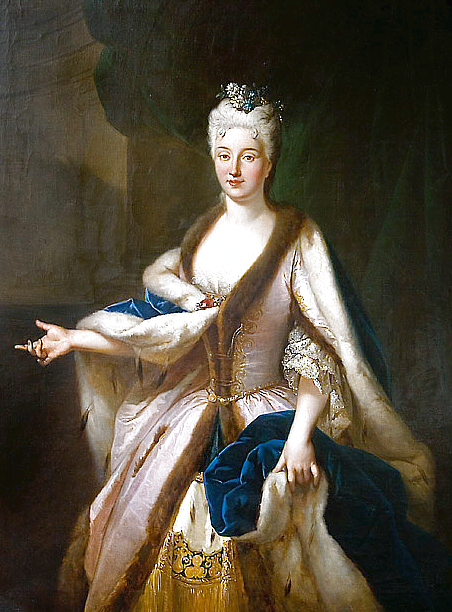
Marianna Lubomirska

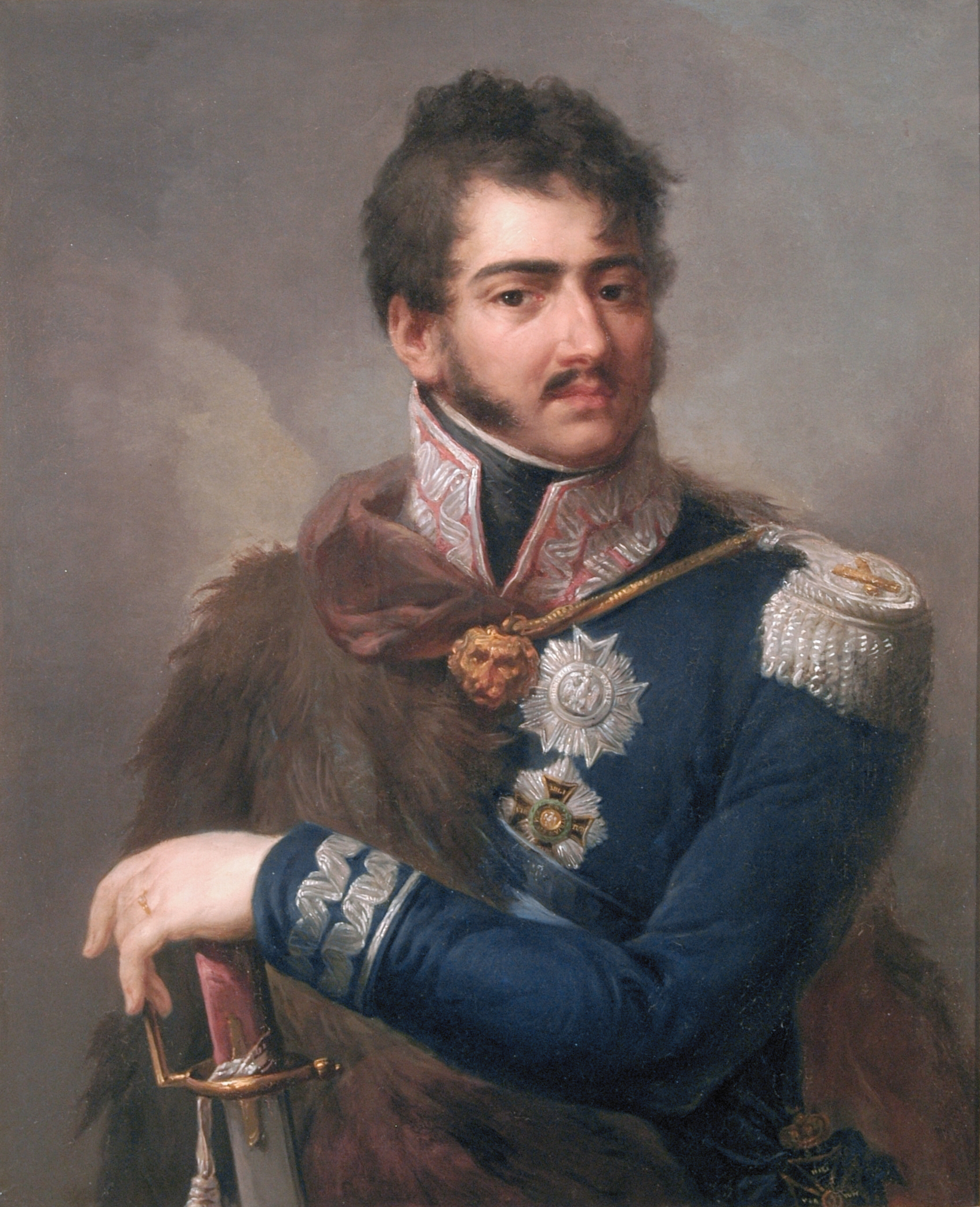
Józef Poniatowski

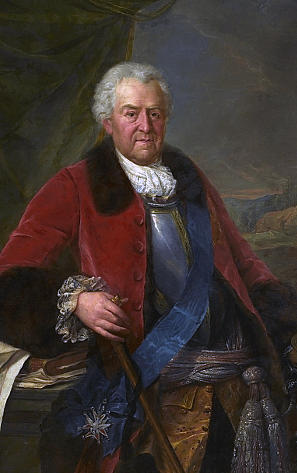
Stanisław Poniatowski

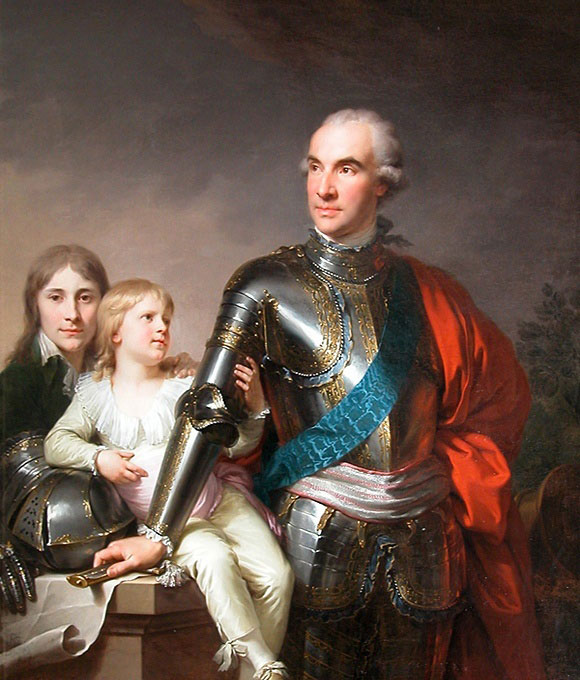
Stanisław Szczęsny Potocki

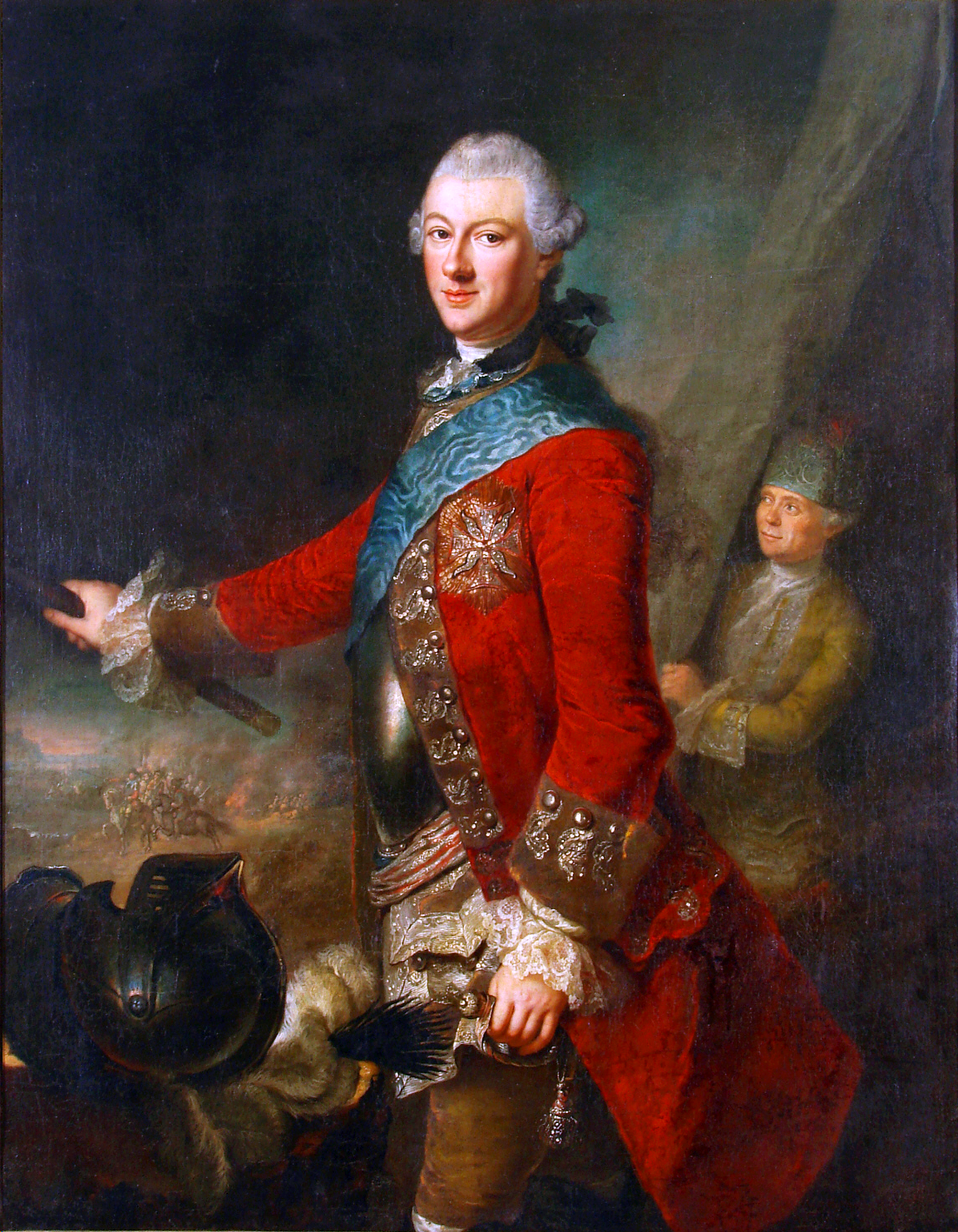
Michał Kazimierz Ogiński

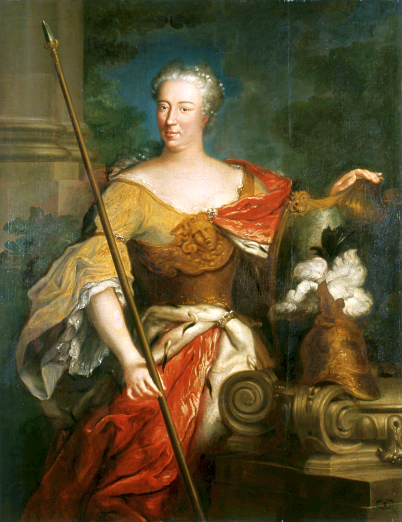
Elżbieta Sieniawska

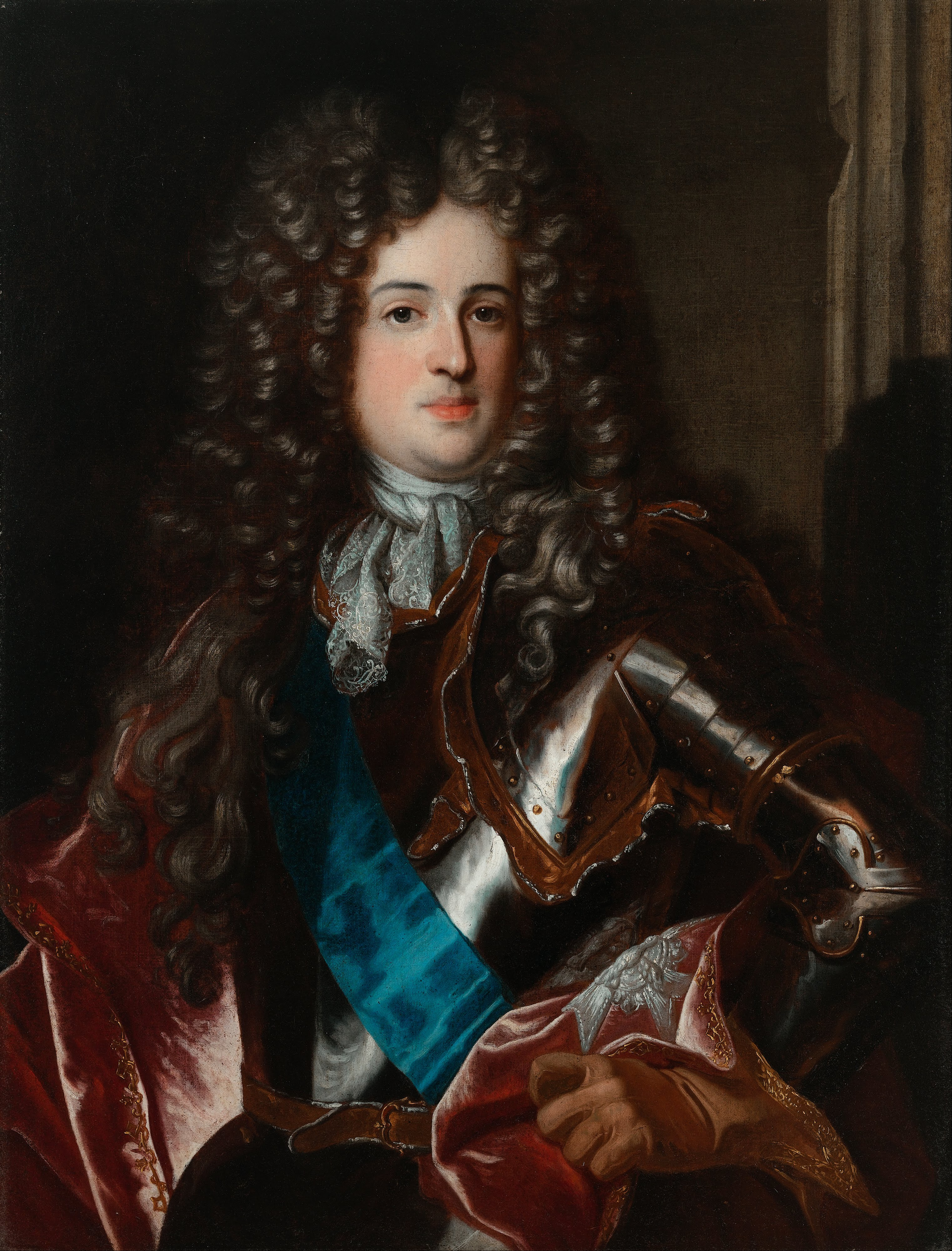
Aleksander Benedykt Sobieski

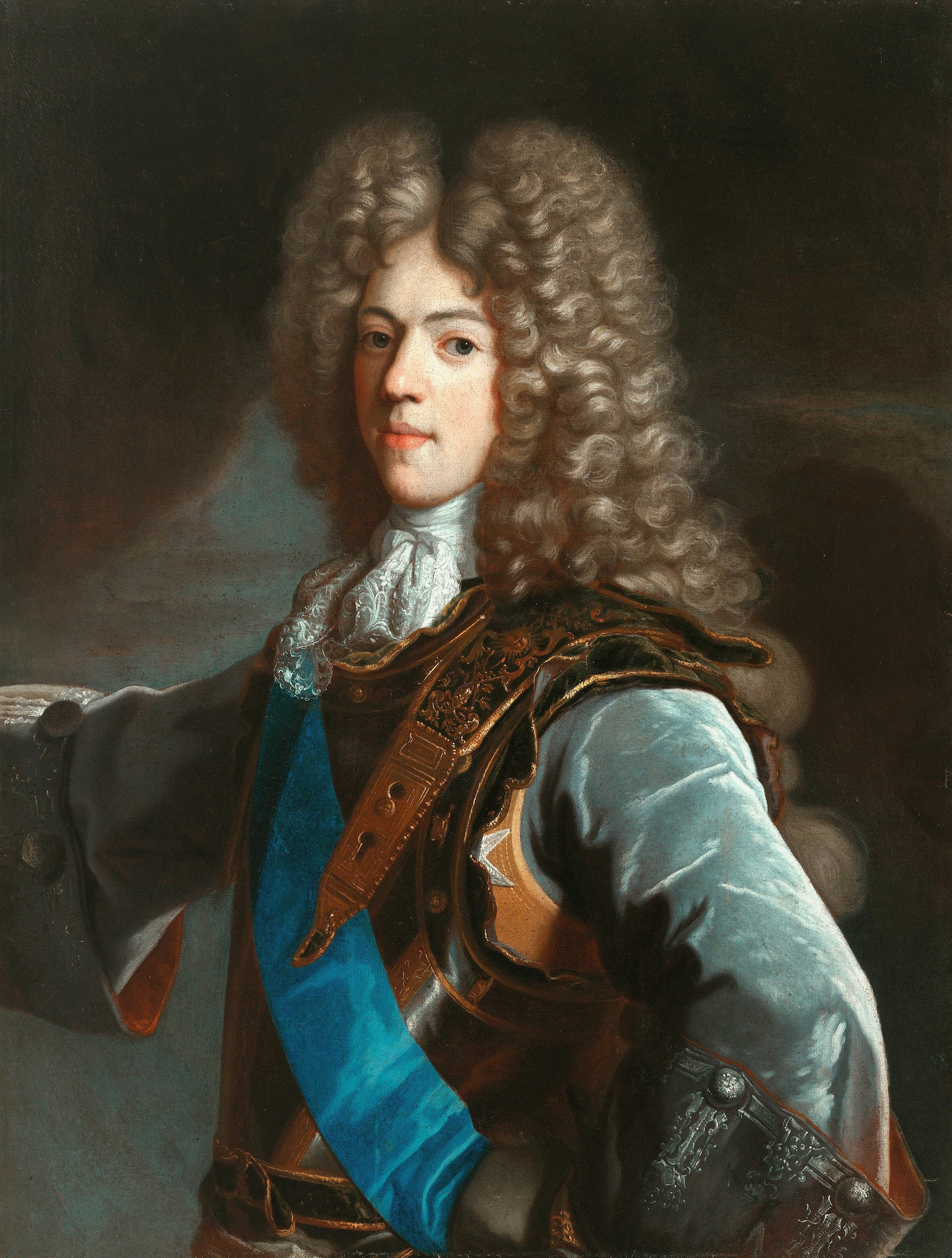
Konstanty Władysław Sobieski

- Marianna Wiśniowiecka, 1600-1624
- Anna Eufrozyna Chodkiewicz, 1600–1631
- Adam Kisiel, 1600–1653, voivode
- Janusz Kiszka, 1600–1653
- Kazimierz Siemienowicz, 1600–1651, general, scientist
- Katarzyna Ostrogska, 1602–1642
- Prokop Sieniawski, 1602–1626, chorąży
- Marcin Kalinowski, ca. 1605–1652, field crown hetman, voivode
- Dominik Aleksander Kazanowski, 1605–1648, voivode
- Andrzej Leszczyński, 1606–1651, voivode
- Jan Kazimierz Krasiński, 1607–1669, voivode
- Andrzej Trebicki, 1607–1679, bishop
- Andrzej Leszczyński, 1608–1658, chancellor and primate
- Paweł Jan Sapieha, 1609–1665, voivode
- Aleksander Sielski, 1610-1682, Marshal, Castellan, Chamberlain, Envoy
- Krzysztof Opaliński, 1611–1655, voivode
- Bogusław Leszczyński, 1612–1659, starost
- Łukasz Opaliński, 1612–1666
- Hieronim Radziejowski, 1612–1667, chancellor
- Janusz Radziwiłł 1612–1655, hetman, voivode
- Jeremi Wiśniowiecki, 1612–1651, voivode
- Kazimierz Franciszek Czarnkowski, 1613–1656
- Mikołaj Krzysztof Sapieha, 1613–1639, voivode
- Bogusław Leszczyński, 1614–1659
- Aleksander Michał Lubomirski, 1614–1677
- Jan Kazimierz Chodkiewicz, 1616–1660, castellan of Vilna
- Jerzy Sebastian Lubomirski, 1616–1667
- Władysław Dominik Zasławski, 1616–1656, voivode
- Anna Krystyna Lubomirska, 1618–1667
- Konstancja Lubomirska, 1618–1646
- Andrzej Potocki, 1618–1663. voivode
- Aleksander Koniecpolski Junior, 1620–1659, voivode, starost, chorazy
- Konstanty Jacek Lubomirski, 1620–1663, starost
- Michał Florian Rzewuski 1620-1687, starost, Treasurer of the Crown Court
- Bogusław Radziwiłł, 1620–1669
- Andrzej Maksymilian Fredro, 1620–1679, writer
- Wincenty Korwin Gosiewski, 1620–1662
- Krzysztof Grzymułtowski, 1620–1687, voivode
- Krzysztof Zygmunt Pac, 1621–1684, chancellor
- Jan Andrzej Morsztyn, 1621–93, poet
- Wacław Potocki, 1621–1696, poet, writer
- Adam Hieronim Sieniawski, 1623–1650, starost
- Wincenty Gosiewski, 1625–1662
- Michał Kazimierz Radziwiłł, 1625–1680, hetman, chancellor
- Marek Sobieski, 1628–1652, starost
- Jan III Sobieski, 1629–1696, king
- Stefan Bidziński, 1630–1704, voivode
- Jan Chryzostom Pieniążek, 1630–1712, voivode
- Feliks Kazimierz Potocki, 1630–1702, hetman
- Jan Wielopolski, 1630–1688, chancellor
- Dymitr Jerzy Wiśniowiecki, 1631–1682, hetman, voivode
- Stanisław Jan Jabłonowski, 1634–1702, hetman
- Jan Chryzostom Pasek, 1636–1701, soldier and writer,
- Jan Kazimierz Sapieha the Younger, ca. 1637/1642–1720, since 1700 held the title of a Duke. Since 1681 Field Hetman of Lithuania, the following year he also became the voivod of Vilna. In 1682 promoted to Grand Hetman of Lithuania.
- Józef Karol Lubomirski, 1638–1702, marshal, koniuszy, starost
- Jerzy Franciszek Kulczycki, 1640–1694
- Michał Korybut Wiśniowiecki, 1640–1673, king
- Stanisław Herakliusz Lubomirski, 1642–1702, marshall, starost
- Jan Karol Opaliński, 1642–1695, castellan of Poznań, starost
- Stanisław Mateusz Rzewuski, 1642–1728, voivode
- Marianna Kazanowska, 1643–1687
- Dominik Radziwiłł, 1643–1697, chancellor
- Katarzyna Sobieska, 1643–1694
- Cecylia Maria Radziwiłł, 1643–1682
- Dominik Mikołaj Radziwiłł, 1643–1697, chancellor
- Teresa Chodkiewicz, 1645–1672
- Mikołaj Hieronim Sieniawski, 1645–1683, hetman
- Hieronim Augustyn Lubomirski, 1647–1706, hetman
- Rafał Leszczyński, 1650–1703
- Teofila Ludwika Zasławska, 1650-1709
- Stanisław Antoni Szczuka, 1652–1710, chancellor
- Jerzy Dominik Lubomirski, 1654–1727, voivode
- Teresa Lubomirska, 1658–1712
- Anna Jabłonowska, 1660–1727
- Bogusław Korwin Gosiewski, 1660-1744
- Andrzej Taczanowski, c. 1660-18th century, knight commander 1683 Battle of Vienna
- Teodor Andrzej Potocki, 1664–1738, primate
- Adam Mikołaj Sieniawski, 1666–1726, hetman
- Jakub Ludwik Sobieski, 1667–1737, crown-prince
- Elżbieta Lubomirska, 1669–1729
- Karol Stanisław Radziwiłł, 1669–1719, koniuszy, chancellor
- Michał Franciszek Sapieha, 1670-1700
- Stanisław Ernest Denhoff, 1673–1728, hetman
- Stanisław Chomętowski, 1673–1728, hetman
- Florian Pacanowski, 1673–1725, ambassador
- Józef Potocki, 1673–1752, hetman
- Kazimierz Czartoryski, 1674–1741
- Józef Lubomirski, 1676–1732, voivode
- Franciszek Maksymilian Ossoliński, 1676–1756, treasurer, zupnik, starost
- Stanisław Poniatowski, 1676–1762
- Teresa Kunegunda Sobieska, 1676–1730
- Zygmunt Unrug, 1676–1732, starosta, chamberlain, ambassador to Prussia
- Stanisław Leszczyński, 1677–1766, king
- Aleksander Benedykt Sobieski, 1677–1714, prince
- Jan Fryderyk Sapieha, 1680–1751, Grand Recorder of Lithuania between 1706 and 1709, since 1716 the castellan of Troki and after 1735 the Grand Chancellor of Lithuania
- Konstanty Władysław Sobieski, 1680–1726, prince
- Michał Serwacy Wiśniowiecki, 1680–1744, chancellor, hetman
- Franciszek Bieliński, 1683–1766, marshal, voivode
- Teodor Lubomirski, 1683–1745
- Jan Tarło, 1684–1750, voivode
- Jerzy Ignacy Lubomirski, 1687–1753
- Jan Klemens Branicki, 1689–1771, magnate, hetman, castellan
- Stefan Garczyński, voivode of Poznań, writer
- Aleksander Dominik Lubomirski, 1693–1720
- Marianna Lubomirska, 1693–1729
- Katarzyna Barbara Radziwiłł, 1693–1730
- Mikołaj Krzysztof Radziwiłł, 1695–1715, podstoli, starost
- Andrzej Stanisław Załuski, 1695–1758, bishop
- Michał Fryderyk Czartoryski, 1696–1775, castellan, chancellor
- August Aleksander Czartoryski, 1697–1782
- Maria Zofia Sieniawska, 1698–1771, countess
- Jerzy Detloff Fleming, 1699–1771
- Zuzanna Korwin Gosiewska, 17th century-1660
- Helena Tekla Lubomirska, 17th century-1687
- Krystyna Lubomirska, 17th century-1669
- Wiktoria Elżbieta Potocka, 17th century-1760
- Aleksander Michał Lubomirski, 17th century-1673
- Stanisław Koniecpolski, 17th century-1682, voivode
- Jan Wielopolski, 17th century-1688, castellan, voivode
- Andrzej Potocki, 17th century-1692
- Franciszek Sebastian Lubomirski, 17th century-1699
- Anna Krystyna Lubomirska, 17th century-1701
- Teresa Korwin Gosiewska, 17th century-1708
- Jan Dobrogost Krasiński, 17th century-1717
- Jan Aleksander Koniecpolski, 17th century-1719, voivode, starosta
- Franciszek Lubomirski, 17th century-1721
- Józef Potocki, 17th century-1723, starost
- Jan Kazimierz Sapieha the Elder 17th century–1730, Grand Hetman of Lithuania
- Jan Szembek, 17th century-1731, chancellor
- Franciszek Wielopolski, 17th century–-1732, voivode
- Aleksander Jan Jabłonowski, 17th century-1733
- Jerzy Aleksander Lubomirski, 17th century-1735
- Anna Lubomirska, 17th century-1736
- Jan Lubomirski, 17th century-1736
- Antoni Benedykt Lubomirski, 17th century-1761
- Krystyna Branicka, 17th century-1767

=== 18th century ===
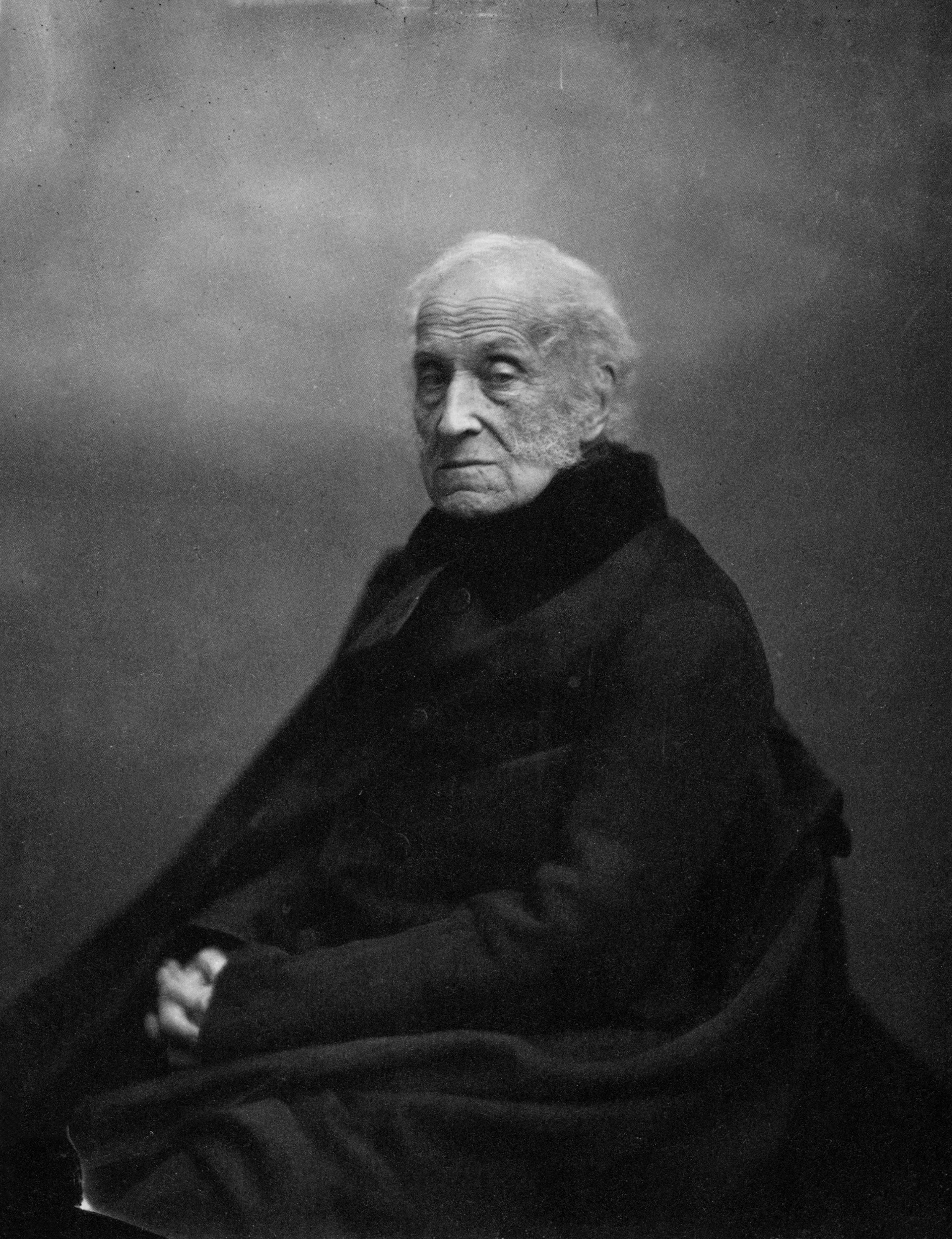
Adam Jerzy Czartoryski

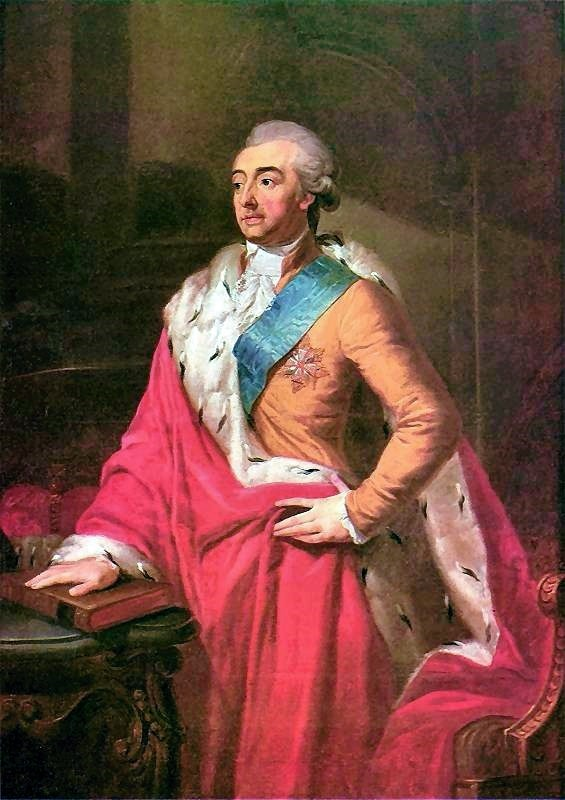
Adam Kazimierz Czartoryski

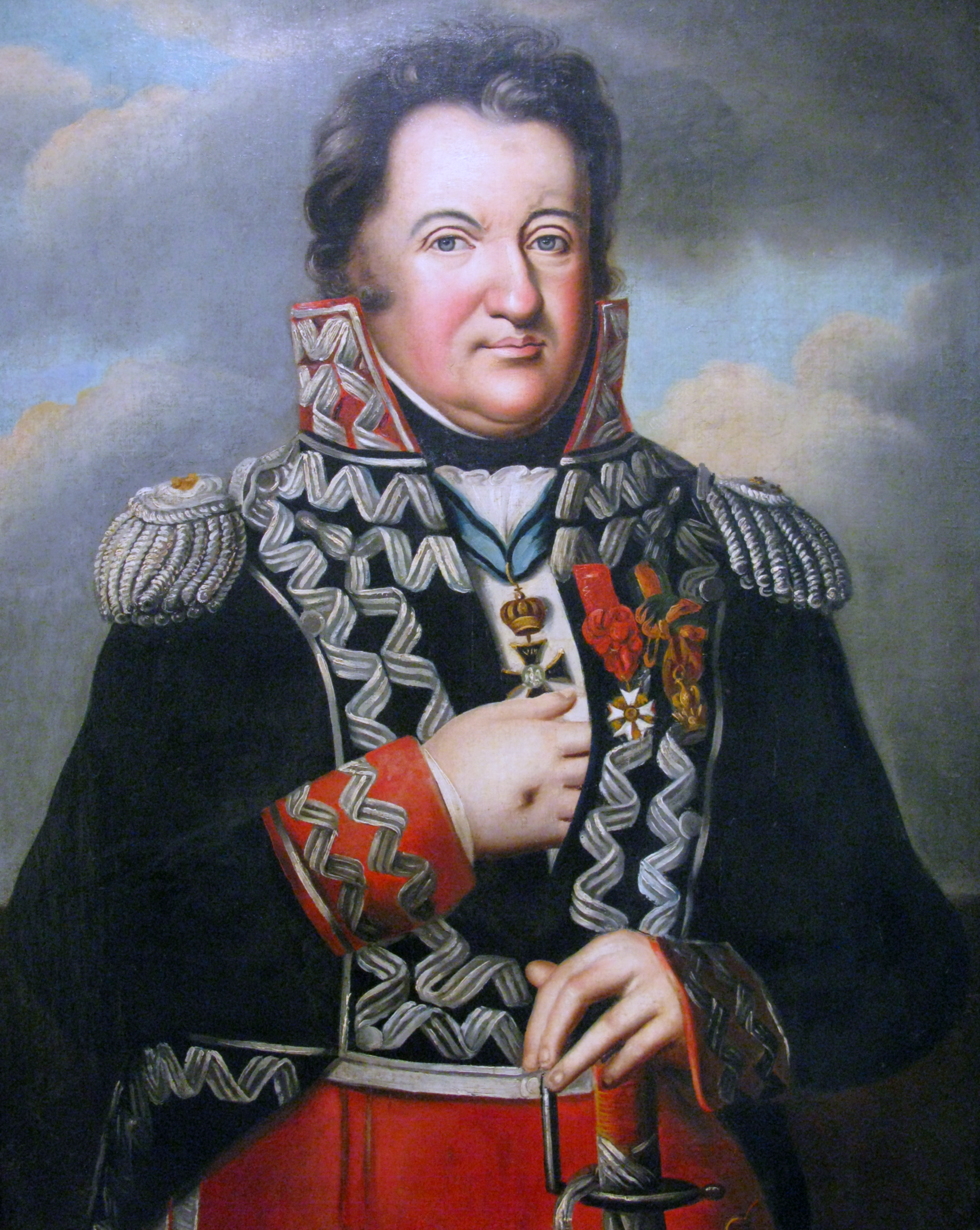
Jan Henryk Dąbrowski

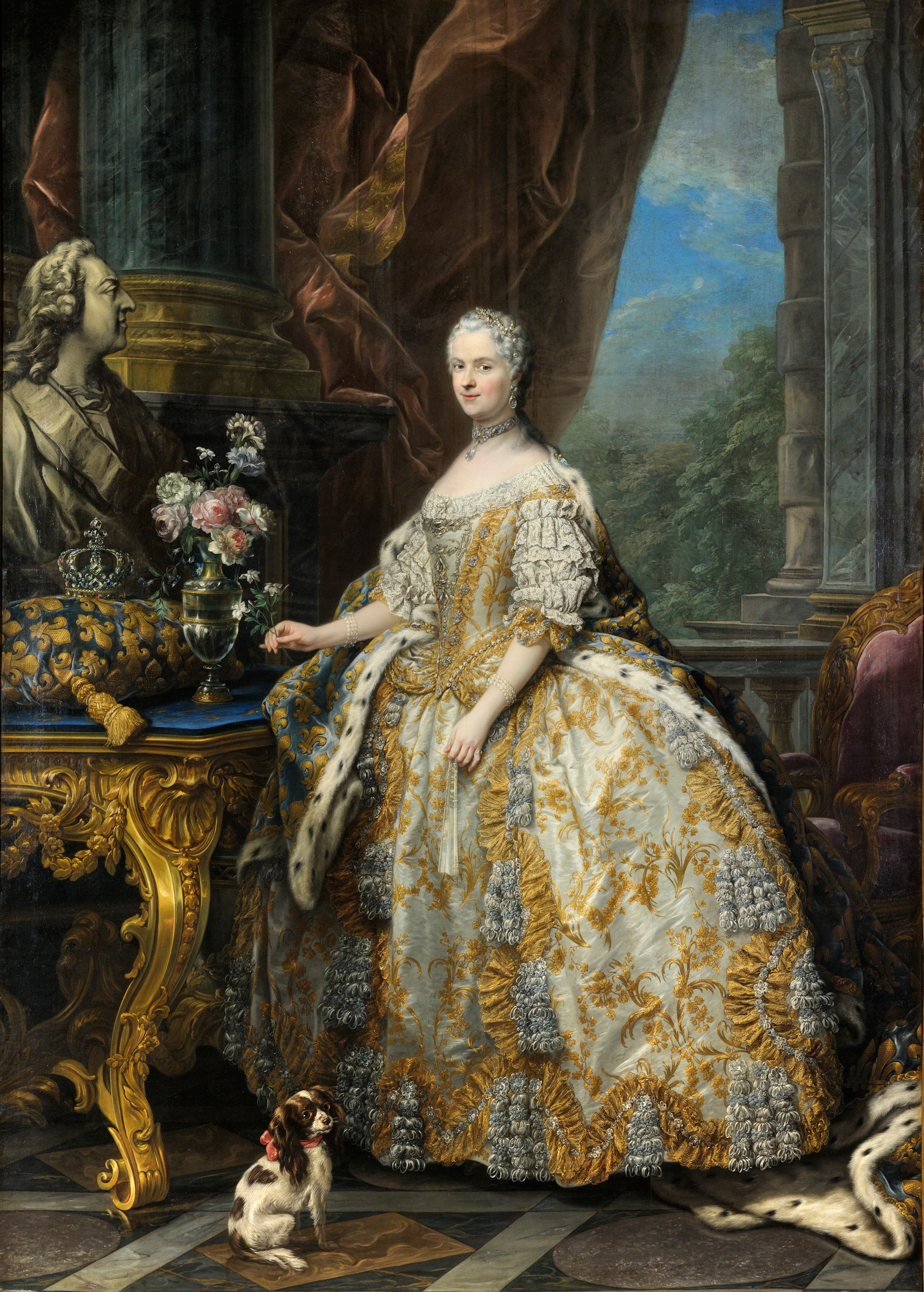
Maria Leszczyńska

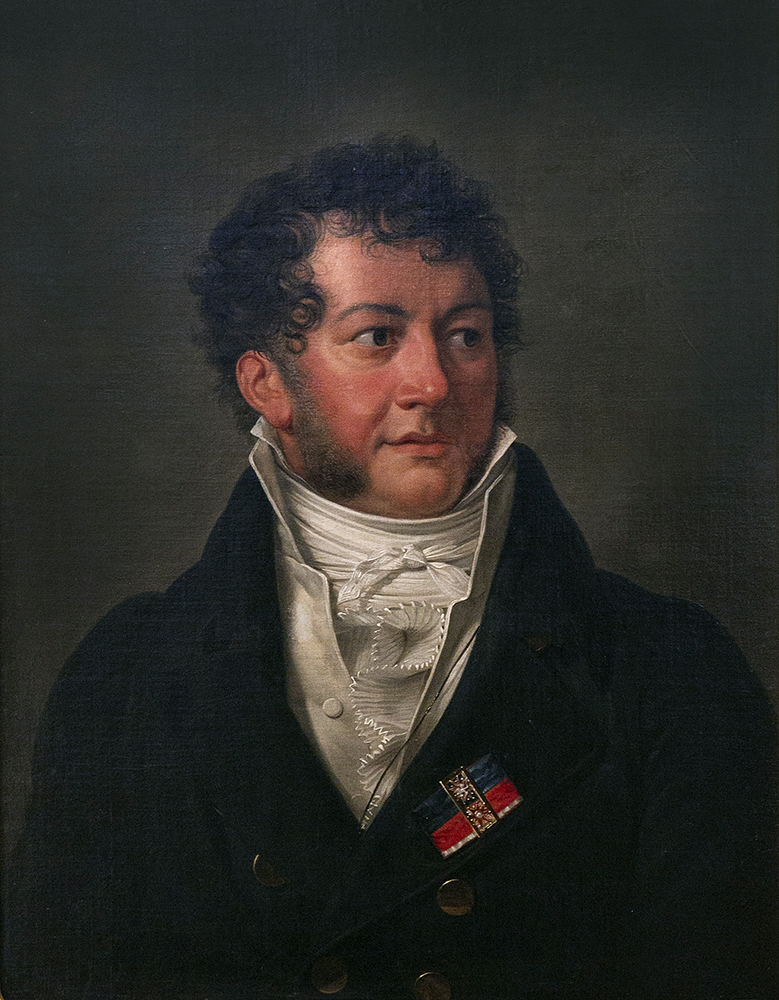
Michał Kleofas Ogiński

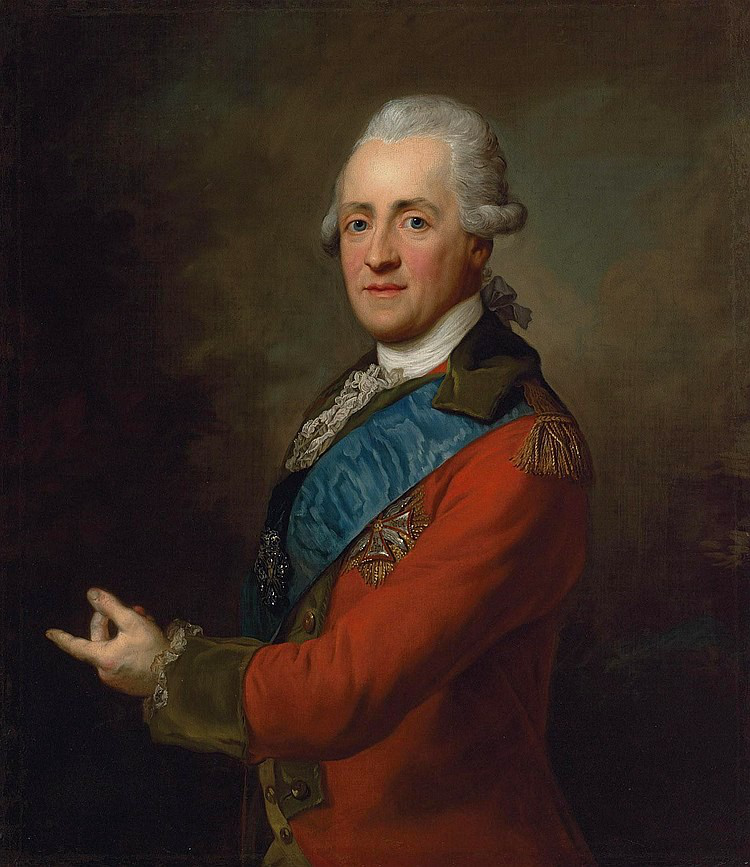
Stanisław Poniatowski

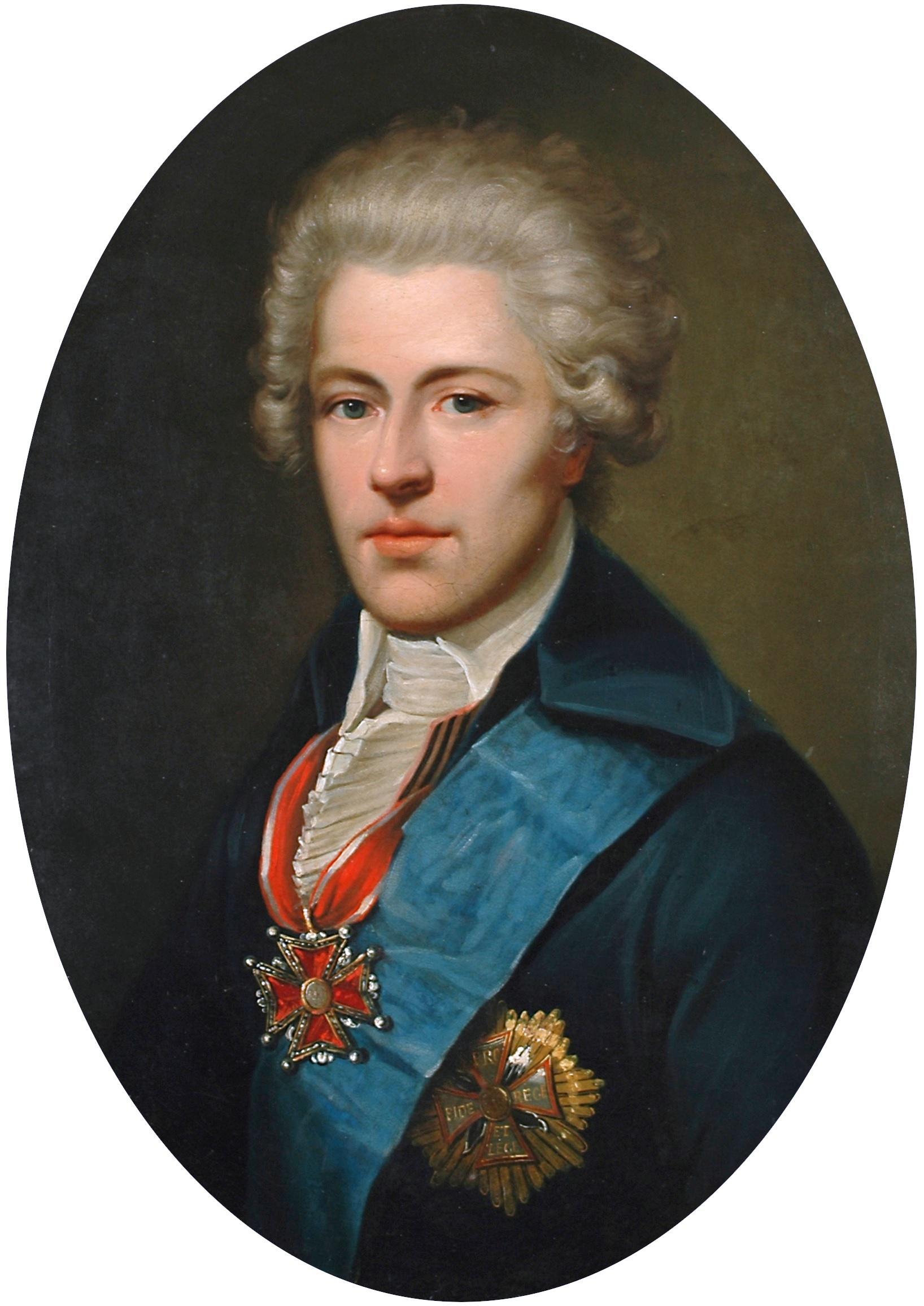
Ignacy Potocki

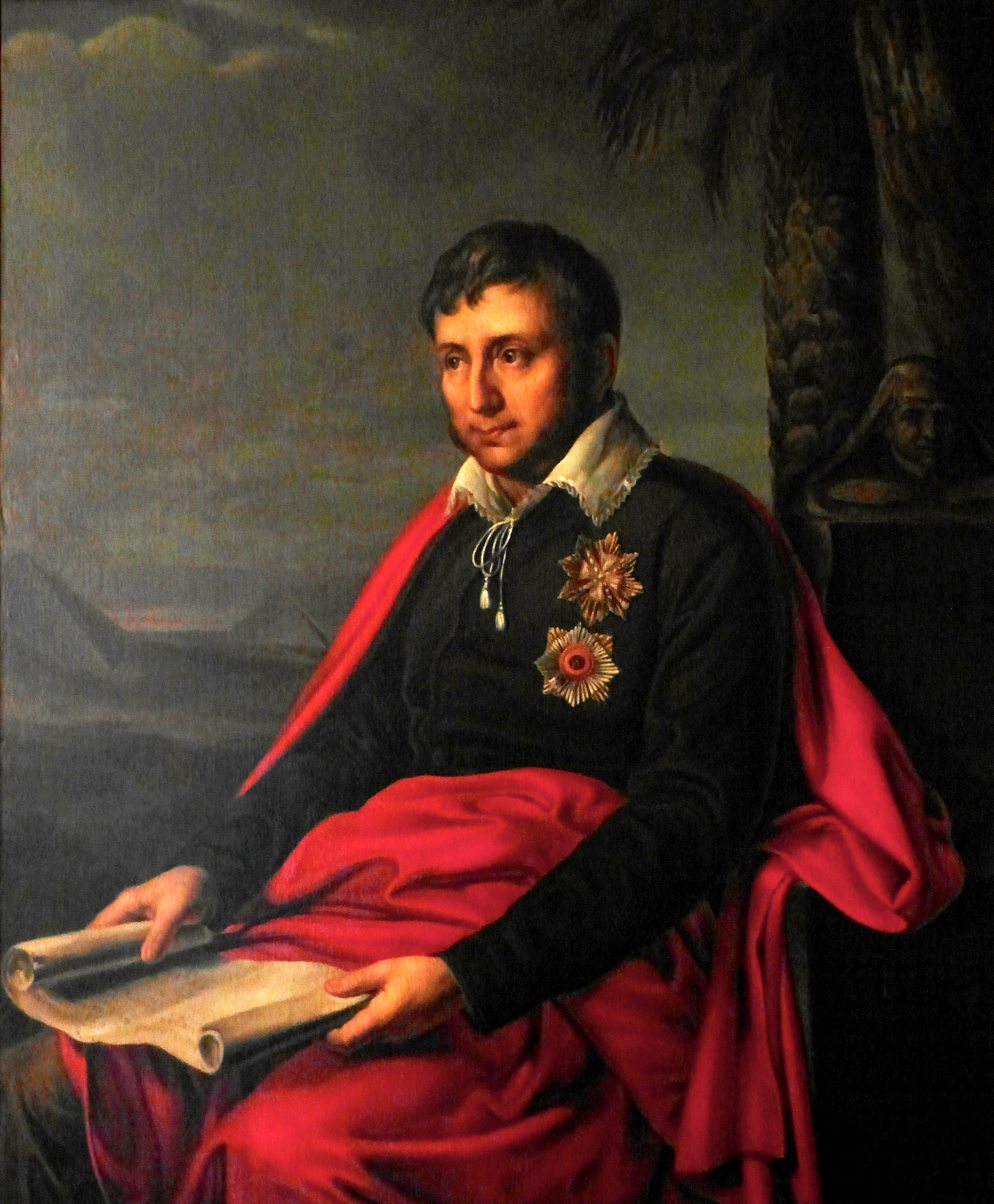
Jan Potocki

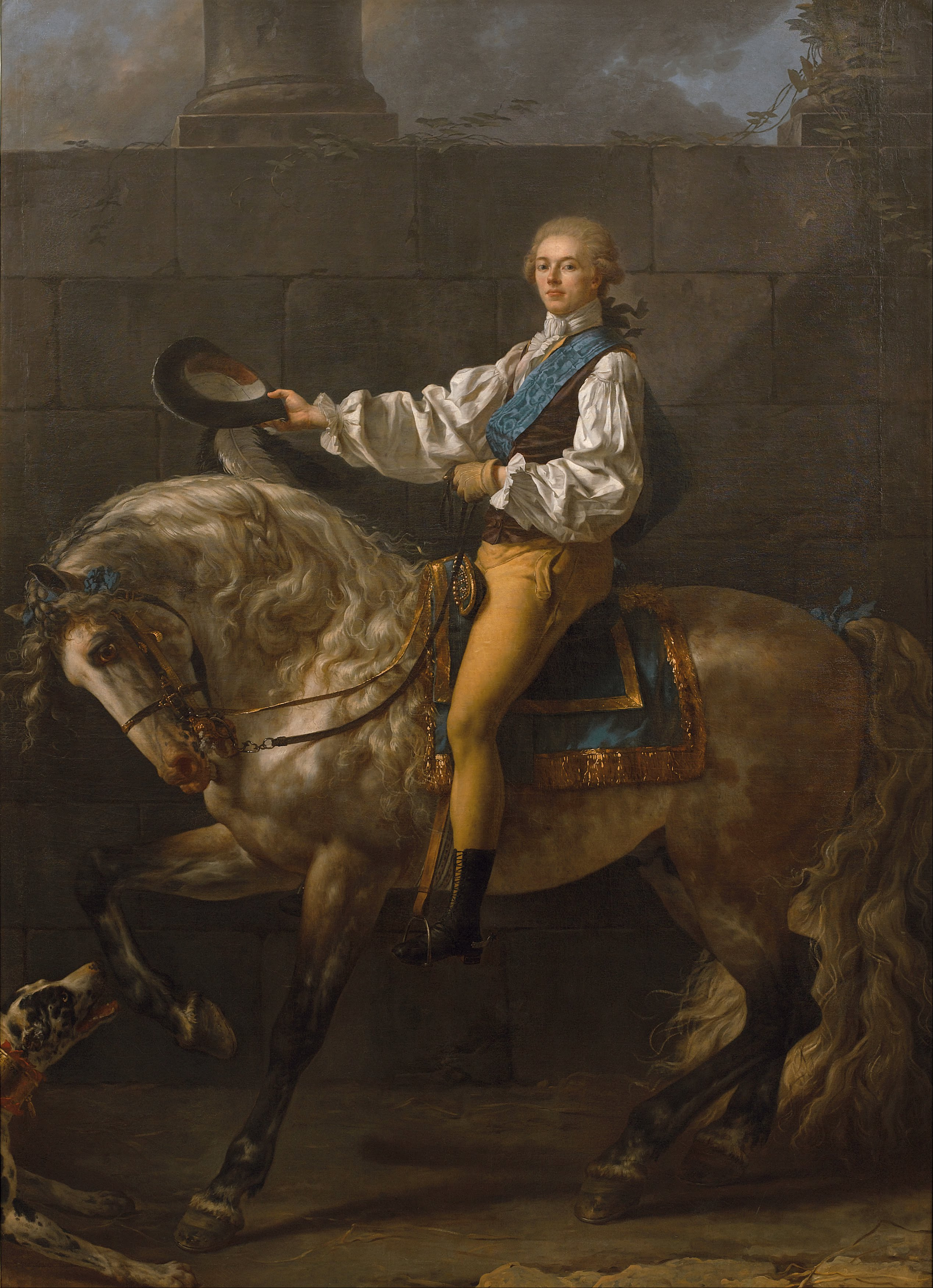
Stanisław Kostka Potocki

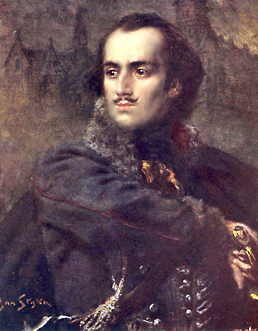
Kazimierz Pułaski

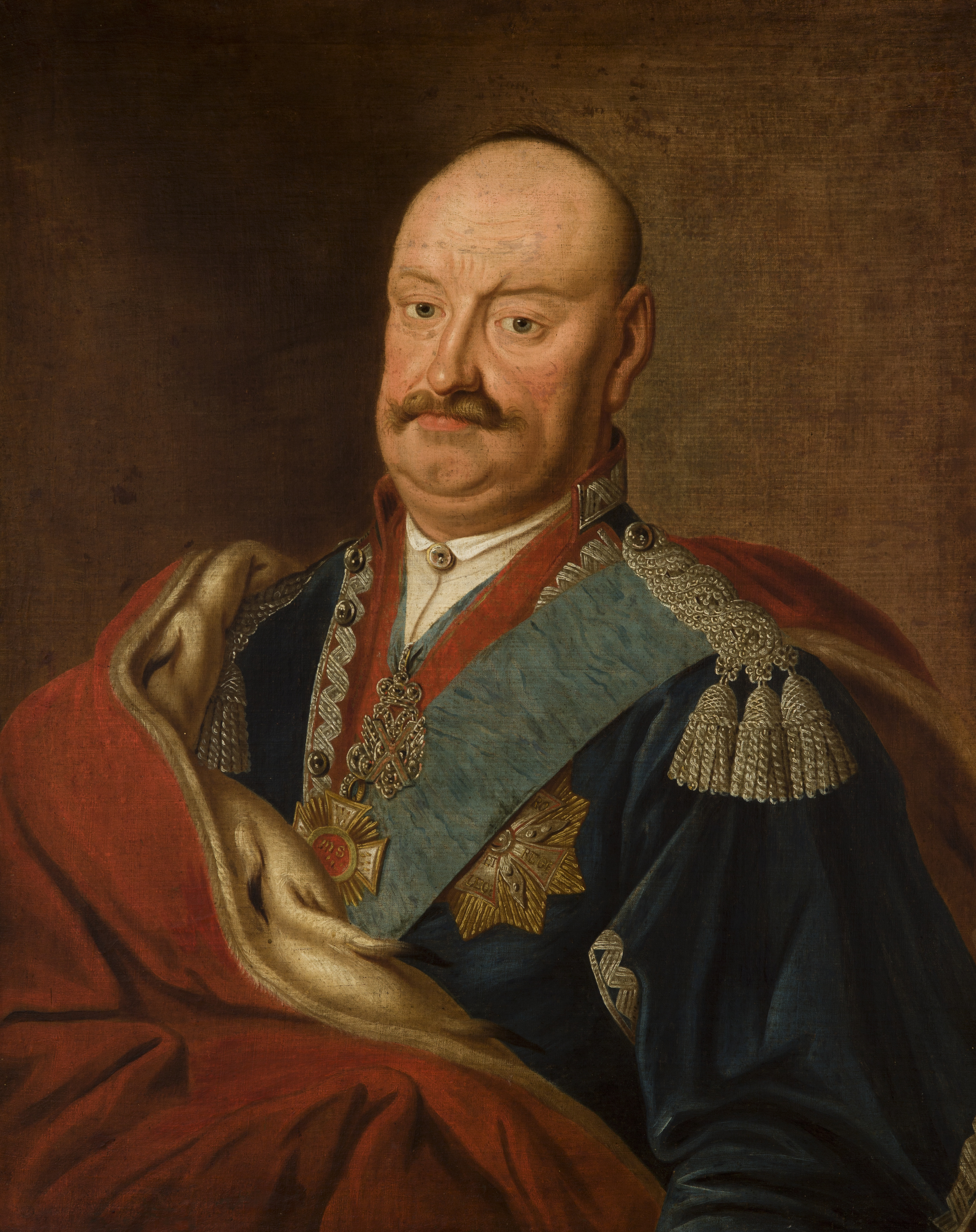
Karol Stanisław Radziwiłł

- Konstancja Czartoryska, 1700–1759
- Michał Józef Massalski, c. 1700–1768, hetman
- Franciszek Salezy Potocki, 1700–1772, voivode
- Jan Wielopolski, 1700–1773, voivode
- Michał Kazimierz "Rybeńko" Radziwiłł, 1702–176, hetman, castellan
- Maria Klementyna Sobieska, 1702–1735, crown princess
- Józef Andrzej Załuski, 1702–1774, bishop
- Maria Leszczyńska, 1703–1768, princess
- Wladyslaw Aleksander Lubienski, 1703-1767, archbishop of Lwow and primate of Poland
- Stanisław Lubomirski, 1704–1793, voivode
- Michał Grocholski, 1705–1765, cześnik
- Wacław Rzewuski, 1705–1779, hetman
- Marianna Jabłonowska, 1708–1765
- Franciszek Ferdynant Lubomirski, 1710–1747
- Józef Aleksander Jabłonowski, 1711–1777, voivode
- Walenty Łukawski,–1773
- Mikołaj Bazyli Potocki, 1712–1782, starost
- Andrzej Mokronowski, 1713–1784, voivode
- Adam Tarło, 1713–1744, voivode
- Hieronim Florian Radziwiłł, 1715–1760, podczaszy, starost
- Kajetan Sołtyk, 1715–1788, bishop
- Barbara Sanguszko, 1718-1791, duchess, writer and philanthropist
- Antoni Lubomirski, 1718–1782, voivode
- Zofia Lubomirska, 1718–1790
- Kazimierz Poniatowski, 1721–1800, podkomorzy
- Jacek Jezierski, 1722–1805
- Stanisław Lubomirski, 1722–1782, prince
- Celestyn Czaplic, 1723–1803, podczaszy, podkomorzy, koniuszy
- Kazimierz Krasiński, 1725–1802
- Piotr Ożarowski, 1725–1794, hetman
- Ignacy Jakub Massalski, 1726–1794, bishop
- Antonina Czartoryska, 1728–1746, princess
- Anna Luiza Mycielska, 1729–1771
- Joachim Chreptowicz, 1729–1812, physiocrat, last Grand Chancellor of Lithuania,
- Franciszek Ksawery Branicki, 1730–1819, magnate, hetman
- Franciszek Grocholski, 1730–1792
- Maria Karolina Lubomirska, 1730–1795
- Izabella Poniatowska, 1730–1801
- Aniela Miączyńska, 1731-?
- Antoni Barnaba Jabłonowski, 1732–1799
- Tomasz Sołtyk, 1732–1808, castellan
- Stanisław August Poniatowski, 1732–1798, king
- Adam Naruszewicz, 1733–1798, writer, bishop
- Adam Kazimierz Czartoryski, 1734–1823, prince
- Stanisław Potocki, 1734–1802, starost, krajczy
- Karol Stanisław "Panie Kochanku" Radziwiłł, 1734–1790, prince, voivode
- Ignacy Krasicki, 1735–1801, bishop, writer
- Tomasz Adam Ostrowski, 1735–1817, castellan
- Andrzej Poniatowski, 1735–1773
- Elżbieta Czartoryska, 1736–1816
- Stanisław Małachowski, 1736–1809
- Michał Jerzy Poniatowski, 1736–1794, archbishop
- Józef Mikołaj Radziwiłł, 1736–1813, voivode
- Elżbieta Czartoryska, 1736–1816, princess
- Paula Szembek 1737-1798, starościna
- Jacek Małachowski, 1737–1821
- Tadeusz Franciszek Ogiński, 1737–1783, voivode
- Stanisław Ferdynand Rzewuski, 1737–1786
- Józef Klemens Czartoryski, 1740–1810
- Szymon Marcin Kossakowski, 1741–1794
- Michał Jerzy Mniszech, 1742–1806, marshal
- Tadeusz Rejtan, 1742–1780
- Seweryn Rzewuski, 1743–1811, hetman
- Michał Hieronim Radziwiłł, 1744–1831
- Maria Ludwika Rzewuska, 1744–1816
- Kazimierz Pułaski, 1745–1779
- Ignacy Wyssogota Zakrzewski, 1745–1802
- Izabela Fleming, 1746–1835, countess
- Tadeusz Kościuszko, 1746–1817, general
- Józef Maksymilian Ossoliński, 1748–1829
- Maciej Radziwiłł, 1749–1800, podkomorzy
- Hugo Kołłątaj, 1750–1812, chancellor
- Roman Ignacy Potocki, 1750–1809
- Karol Antoni Ussakowski 1750-1825, voivode
- Józefina Amalia Mniszech, 1752–1798
- Józef Zajączek, 1752–1826, general
- Stanisław Szczęsny Potocki, 1753–1805, voivode
- Stanisław Sołtyk, 1753–1831
- Ignacy Działyński, 1754–1797, military officer
- Stanisław Poniatowski, 1754–1833
- Jan Henryk Dąbrowski, 1755–1818, Polish general
- Gertruda Komorowska, 1755–1771
- Elżbieta Lubomirska, 1755–1783, princess
- Jan Krasiński, 1756–1790
- Stanisław Kostka Potocki, 1757–1821
- Kazimierz Nestor Sapieha, 1757–1798, artillery general
- Kazimierz Jordan-Rozwadowski, 1757–1836, Polish Patriot
- Julian Ursyn Niemcewicz, 1758–1841, writer
- Feliks Lubienski, 1758-1848, minister of justice, count
- Józef Kajetan Ossoliński, 1758–1834, castellan
- Dominik Dziewanowski, 1759–1827, general
- Władysław Franciszek Jabłonowski, 1769–1802
- Hieronim Wincenty Radziwiłł, 1759–1786, podkomorzy
- Dominik Dziewanowski, 1759–1827, Virtuti Militari
- Dorota Barbara Jabłonowska, 1760–1844
- Aleksandra Lubomirska, 1760–1836
- Konstancja Małgorzata Lubomirska, 1761–1840
- Stanisław Mokronowski, 1761–1821, general
- Antoni Protazy Potocki, 1761–1801, capitalist and industrialist
- Jan Potocki, 1761–1815
- Karol Kniaziewicz, 1762–1842
- Józef Antoni Poniatowski, 1763–1813, prince
- Julia Lubomirska, 1764–1794
- Michał Kleofas Ogiński, 1765–1833, insurrectionist and composer
- Jan Henryk Wołodkowicz, 1765–1825
- Tekla Teresa Lubienska, 1767-1810, dramatist and translator
- Eustachy Erazm Sanguszko, 1768–1844
- Adam Jerzy Czartoryski, 1770–1861, prince
- Jan Krukowiecki, 1772–1850
- Konstanty Adam Czartoryski, 1773–1860
- Rajmund Rembieliński, 1774–1820
- Antoni Radziwiłł, 1775–1833
- Ludwik Pac, 1778–1835
- Aleksander Stanisław Potocki, 1778–1845, castellan
- Michał Gedeon Radziwiłł, 1778–1850
- Jan Nepomucen Umiński, 1778-1851, general
- Klementyna Czartoryska, 1780–1852
- Zofia Czartoryska, 1780–1837
- Antoni Potocki, 1780–1850, castellan
- Jan Kozietulski, 1781–1821
- Wincenty Krasiński, 1782–1858
- Antoni Jan Ostrowski, 1782–1845, castellan, general
- Władysław Grzegorz Branicki, 1783–1843
- Alfred Wojciech Potocki, 1785–1862, ochmistrz of Galicia
- Edward Raczyński, 1786–1845
- Dominik Hieronim Radziwiłł, 1786–1813
- Józefina Maria Czartoryska, 1787–1862
- Artur Potocki, 1787–1832
- Dezydery Chłapowski, 1788–1879, general
- Marie, Countess Walewski, 1789–1817
- Zofia Branicka, 1790–1879
- Władysław Ostrowski, 1790–1869
- Roman Sołtyk, 1790–1843
- Sir Paweł Edmund Strzelecki, 1797–1873, explorer
- Anna Zofia Sapieha, 1799–1864
- Stanisław Potocki, 18th-century-1760, voivode
- Anna Lubomirska, 18th-century-1763
- Józef Sawa-Caliński, 18th-century-1771
- Chajka, 18th-century-1781
- Ludwika Lubomirska, 18th-century-1829
- Józef Makary Potocki, 18th-century-1829

=== 19th century ===
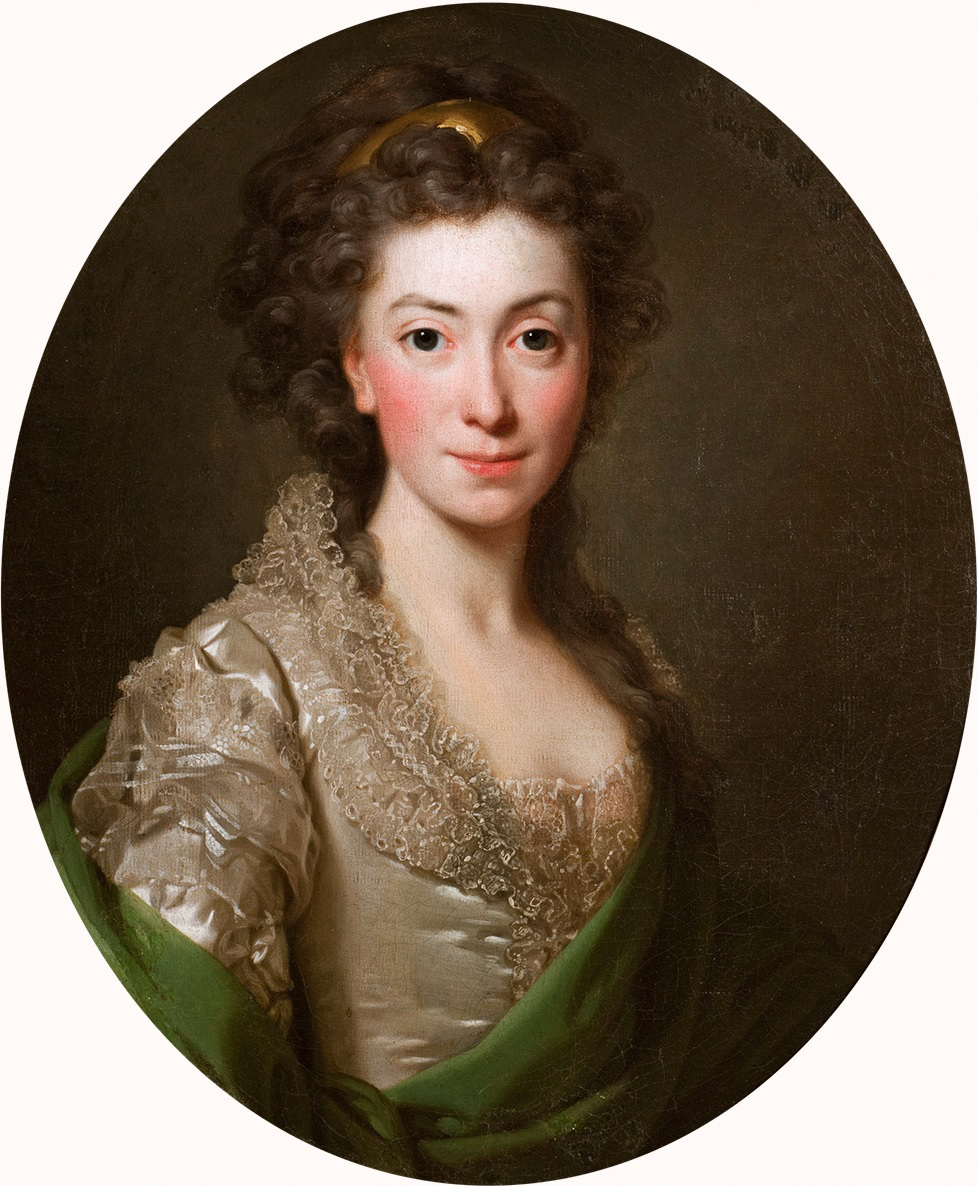
Izabela Czartoryska

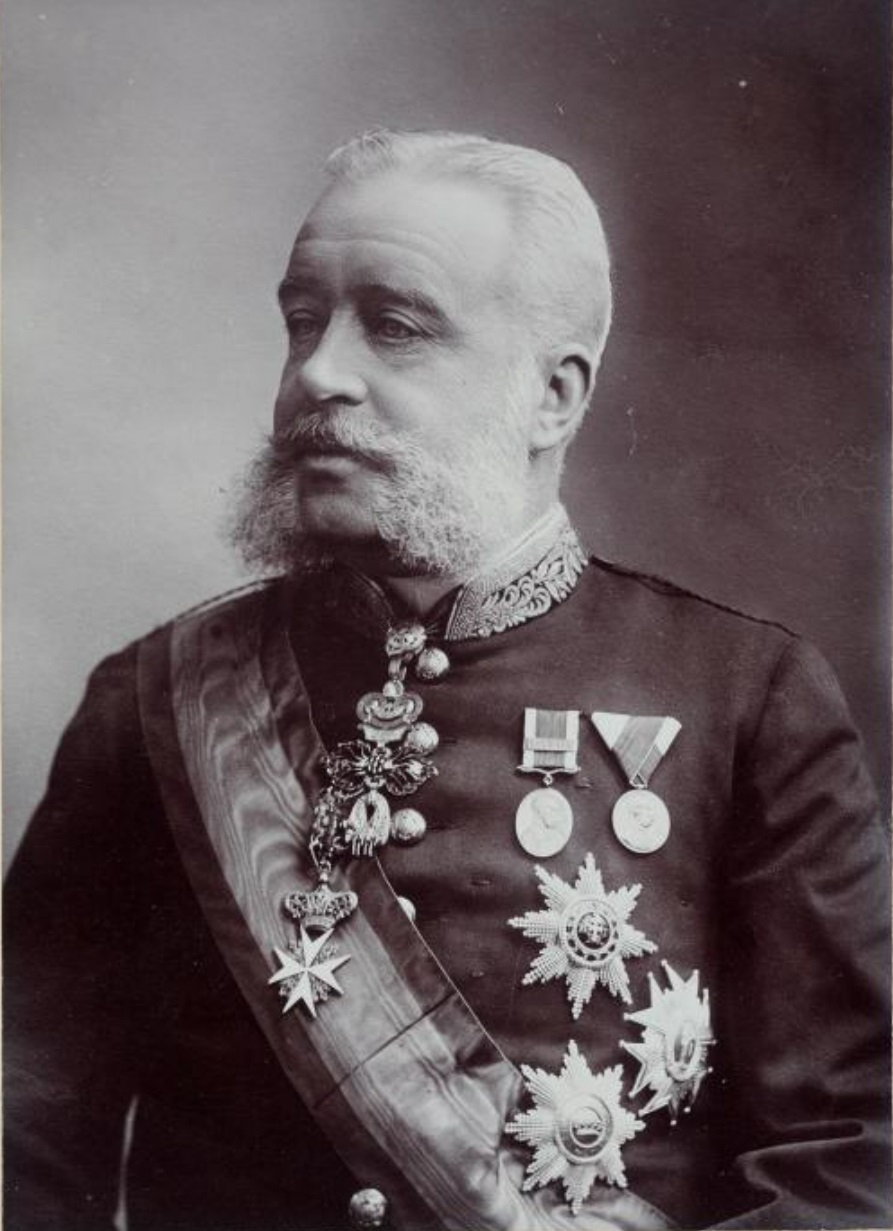
Agenor Maria Gołuchowski

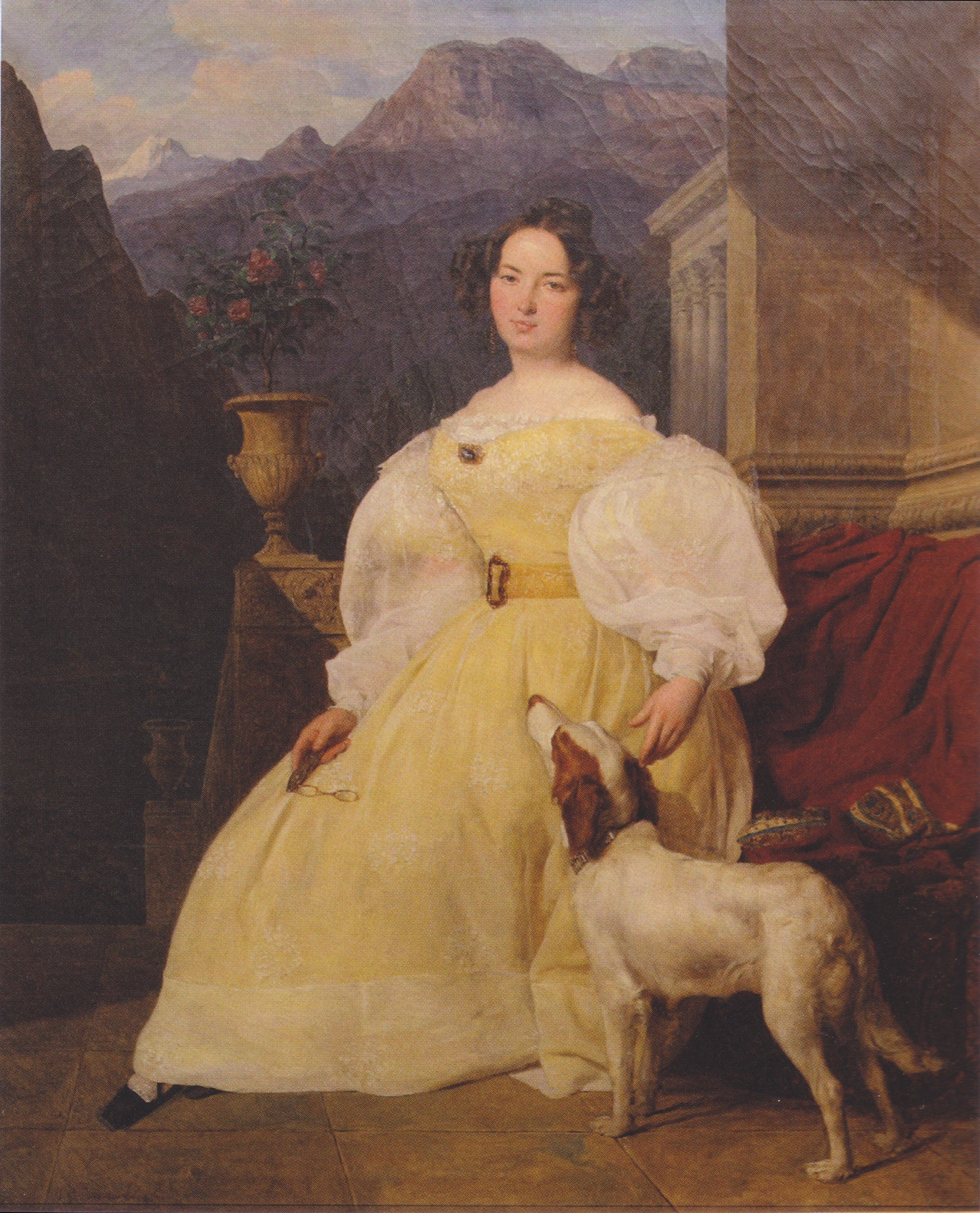
Ewelina Hańska

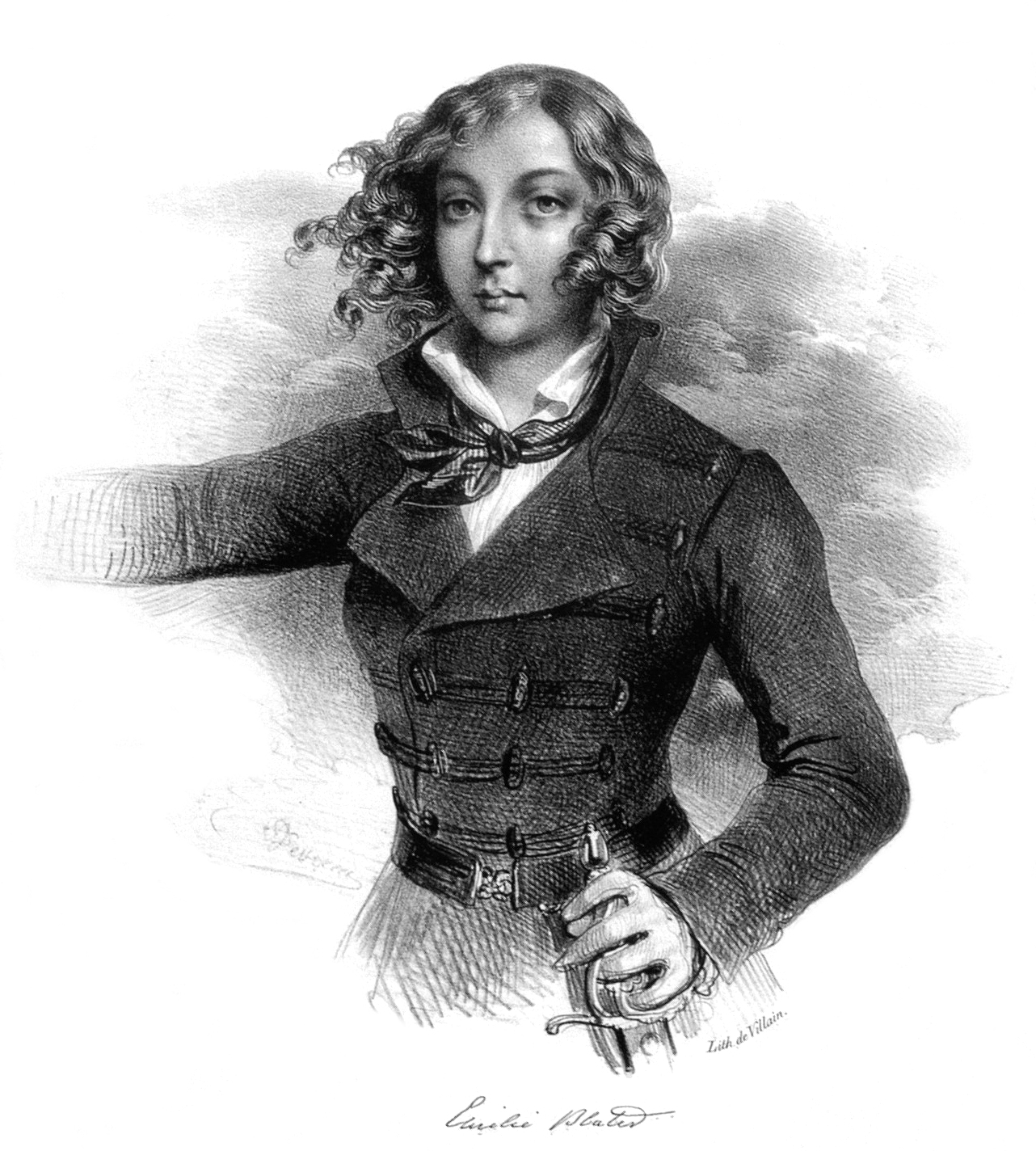
Emilia Plater

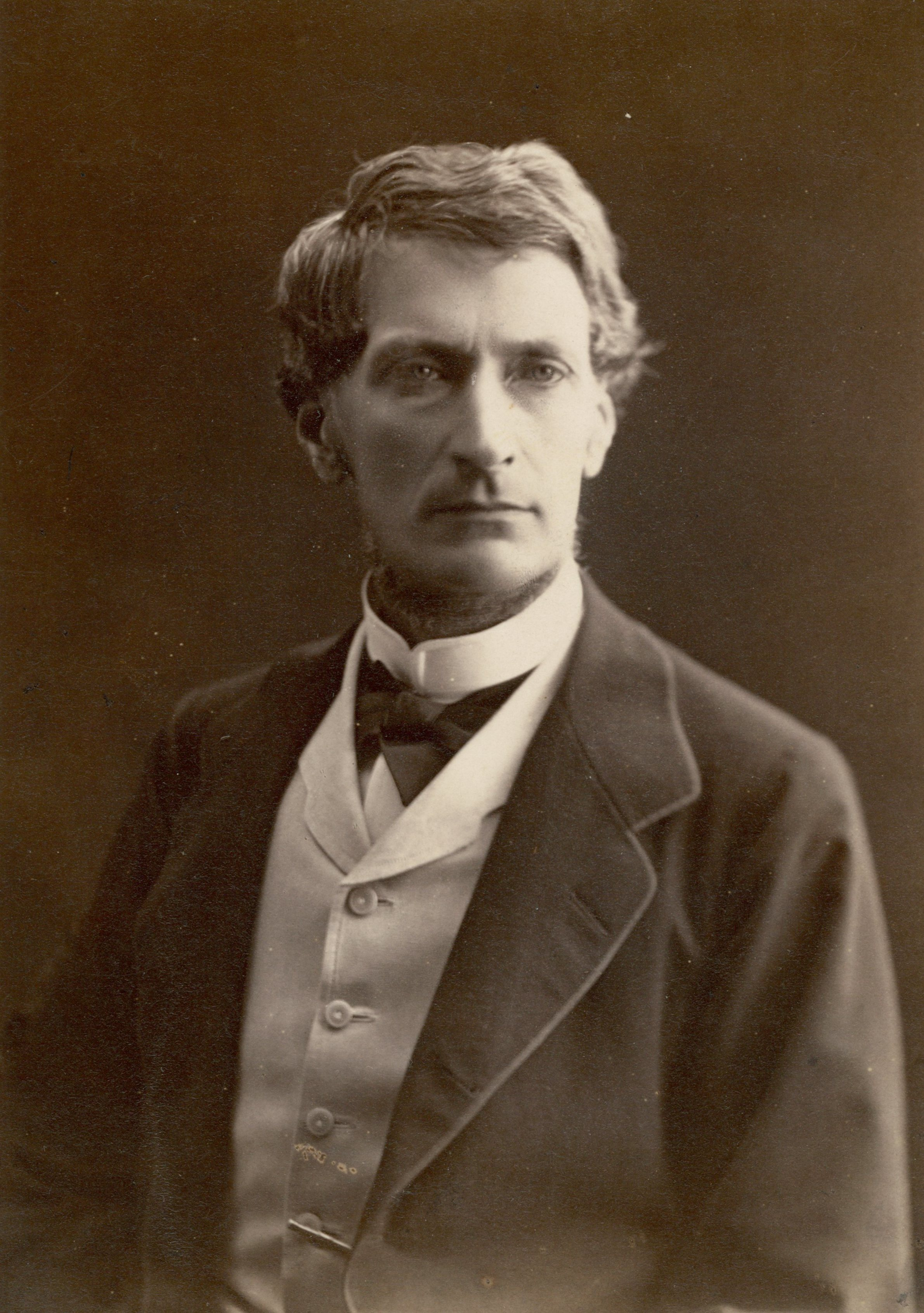
Alfred Józef Potocki

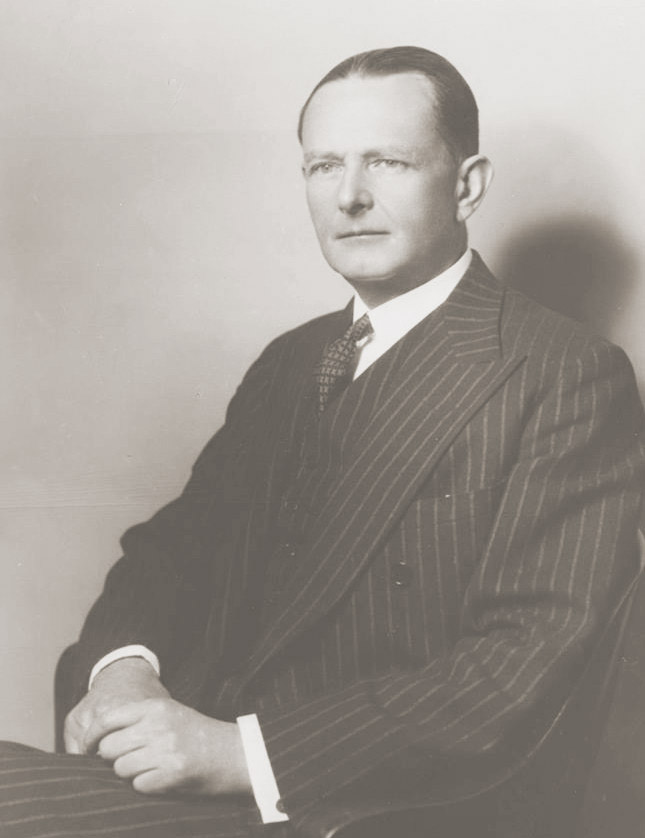
Edward Bernard Raczyński

- Roman Sanguszko, 1800–1881
- Ewelina Hańska, 1801–1882
- Władysław Hieronim Sanguszko, 1803–1870
- Aleksander Wielopolski, 1803–1877
- Leon Sapieha, 1803–1878
- Przemysław Potocki, 1805–1847
- Emilia Plater, 1806–1831, revolutionary
- Franciszka Ksawera Brzozowska, 1807–1872
- Delfina Potocka, 1807–1877
- Szymon Konarski, 1808–1839, revolutionary
- Alexandre Joseph Count Colonna-Walewski, 1810–1868
- Antoni Patek, 1811–1877
- Agenor Gołuchowski, 1812–1875
- Kazimierz Gzowski, 1813–1898, engineer
- Tomasz Chołodecki, 1813–1880, political activist
- Edmund Bojanowski, 1814–1871, beatified by Pope John Paul II
- Alfons Antoni Graf Taczanowski, 1815-1867, count
- Celestyn Chołodecki 1816–1867
- Xavier Branicki, 1816-1879, magnate, financier, philanthropist
- Alfred Józef Potocki, 1817–1889, sejm marshal, prime minister of Austria–Hungary
- Wladyslaw Taczanowski 1819-1890, famed zoologist/ornithologist
- Eliza Branicka, 1820–1876, wife
- Edmund Taczanowski, 1822-1879, Polish general, insurrectionist
- Witold Czartoryski, 1824–1865
- Katarzyna Branicka, 1825–1907
- Wladislaw Taczanowski, 1825–1892, member of German Reichstag, representative of the "Polish Party"
- Włodzimierz Dzieduszycki, 1825–1899
- Jerzy Konstanty Czartoryski, 1828–1912
- Władysław Czartoryski, 1828–1894
- Władysław Umiastowski,1831–1905, marshal of szlachta, count
- Izabella Elżbieta Czartoryska, 1832–1899
- Maria Grocholska, 1833–1928
- Feliks Sobański, 1833-1913, marshal of szlachta, count
- Mikołaj Światopełk-Mirski, 1833–1898
- Raphael Kalinowski, 1835–1907
- Jarosław Dąbrowski, 1836-1871, military officer, Polish independence revolutionary, commander-in-chief of the 1871 Siege and Commune of Paris
- Stanisław Antoni Potocki, 1837–1884
- Stanisław Tarnowski, 1837–1917
- Konstanty Kalinowski, 1838–1864,
- Alfonsyna Miączyńska, 1838–1919
- Nester Trubecki, c.1840–1907, prince
- Eustachy Stanisław Sanguszko, 1842–1903
- Władysław Krasiński, 1844–1873
- Theodore de Korwin Szymanowski, 1846-1901, proponent of a united Europe
- Kasimir Felix Graf Badeni, 1846–1909
- Bolesław Prus, 1847–1912
- Edward Aleksander Raczyński, 1847–1926
- Agenor Maria Gołuchowski, 1849–1921
- Maria Beatrix Krasińska, 1850–1884
- Artur Władysław Potocki, 1850–1890
- Roman Potocki, 1851–1889, count
- Józef Białynia Chołodecki 1852–1934
- August Czartoryski, 1858–1893
- Witold Leon Czartoryski, 1864–1945
- Zdzisław Lubomirski, 1865–1943
- Tadeusz Jordan-Rozwadowski, 1866–1928, general, first chief of staff of the Polish Army, major contributor to victory at the Battle of Warsaw
- Jadwiga Dzieduszycka, 1867–1941
- Jan Nepomucen Potocki, 1867–1943
- Adam Stefan Sapieha, 1867–1951
- Józef Piłsudski, 1867-1935, father of Polish independence
- Rodryg Dunin, 1870–1928
- Maurycy Klemens Zamoyski, 1871–1939
- Waclaw Iwaszkiewicz, 1871-1922, general in the Polish-Soviet war (1919–1920)
- Adam Ludwik Czartoryski 1872–1937
- Wacław Sobieski, 1872–1935
- Paweł Trubecki, 1879–1941, prince
- Eustachy Sapieha, 1881-1963
- Karol Szymanowski, 1882-1937, composer
- Maria Ludwika Krasińska, 1883–1958
- Teresa Łubieńska, 1884-1957, social activist, WWII resistance fighter
- Władysław Raczkiewicz, 1885-1947, President of Poland in exile
- Alfred Niezychowski, 1888–1964
- Samuel Tyszkiewicz, 1889–1954
- Count Tadeusz Josef Żeleński, 1889-1969
- Stanisław Bohdan Grabiński, 1891–1930
- Edward Raczyński, 1891–1993, president
- Adam Zygmunt Sapieha, 1893-1970
- Stefan Tyszkiewicz, 1894-1976, inventor, car manufacturer
- Tadeusz Bór-Komorowski, 1895–1966, Polish general
- Jan Franciszek Czartoryski, 1897–1944
- Emeryk August Hutten-Czapski, (1897–1979)
- Roman Jacek Czartoryski, 1898–1958
- Krzysztof Mikołaj Radziwiłł, 1898–1986
- Karolina Lanckorońska, 1898-2002
- Tadeusz Sulimirski, 1898-1983

=== 20th century and beyond ===
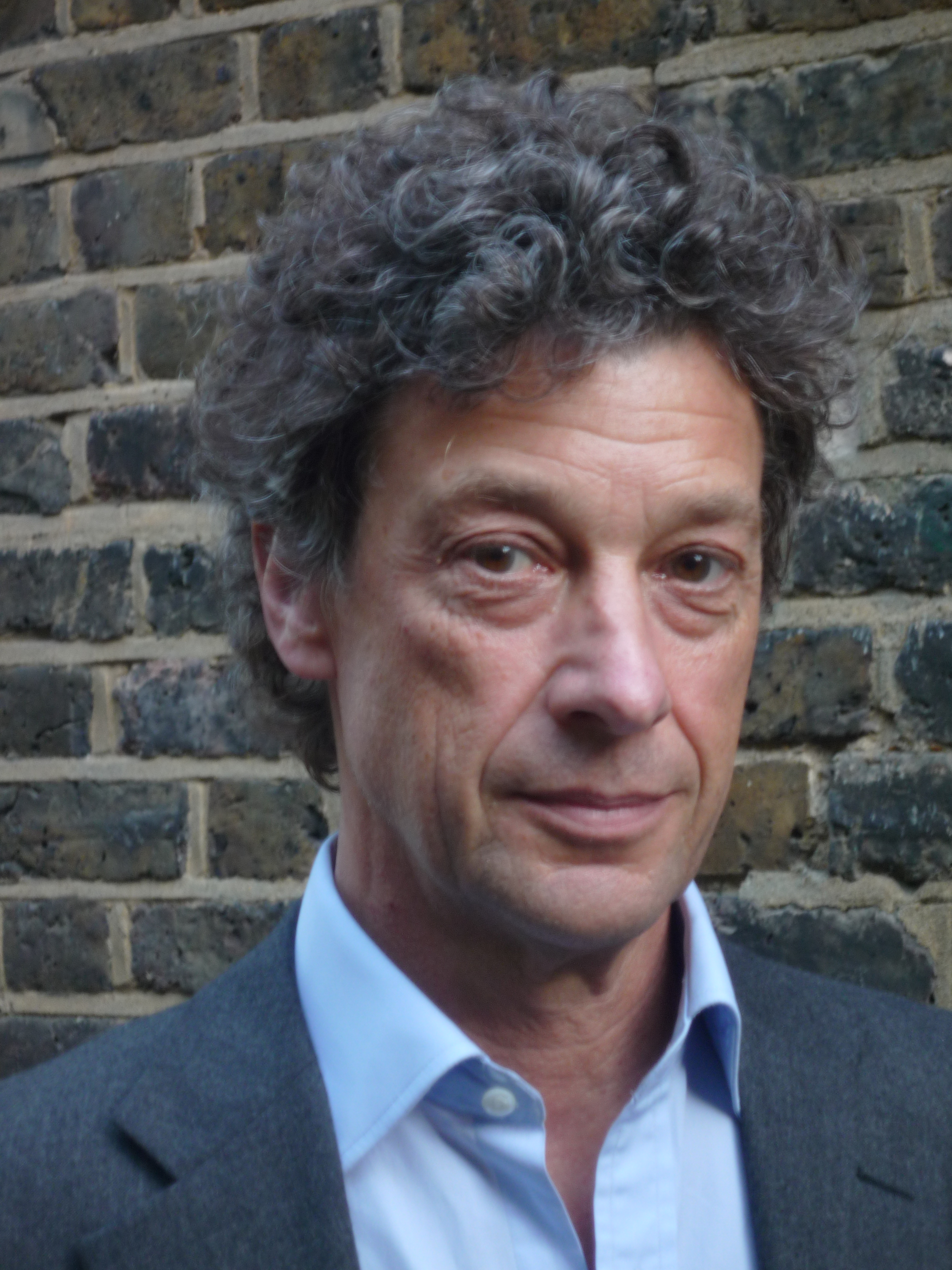
Adam Zamoyski

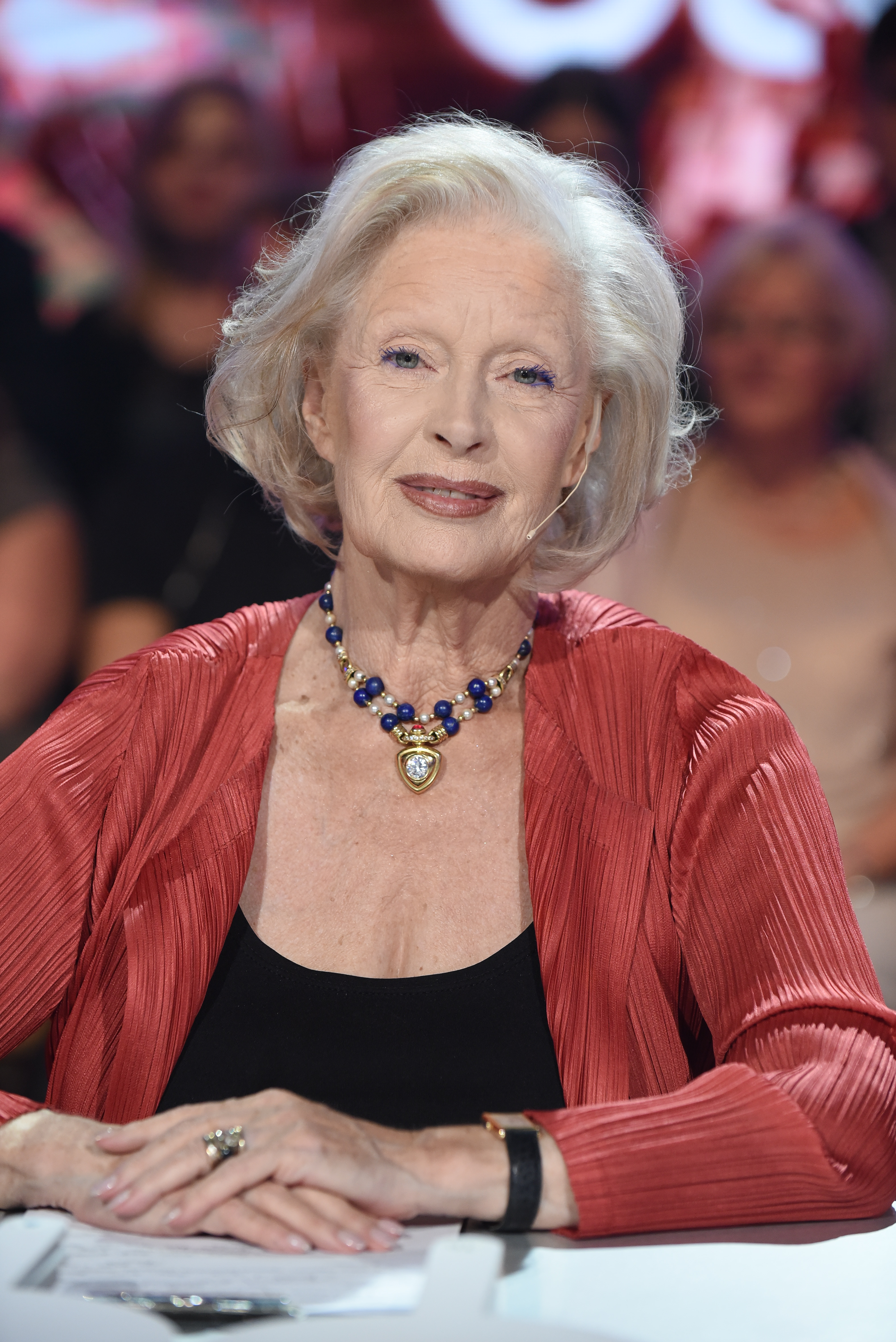
Beata Tyszkiewicz

Nobility privileges were abolished under the Second Polish Republic (1918–1939). Nobility obligations are not addressed. This would leave the legal status of nobility as consisting of obligations only had the article been not later revoked anyway.

- Jan Kanty Zamoyski, 1900-1961
- Napoleon Baniewicz, 1904-1979, neurologist and founder of hospitals
- Elżbieta Czartoryska, 1905–1989
- Adam Michał Czartoryski, 1906–1998
- Augustyn Józef Czartoryski, 1907–1944
- Antoni Dunin, 1907–1939
- Piotr Michał Czartoryski, 1909–1993
- Zygmunt Kurnatowski of Lodzia. He obtained the hereditary papal title of Count from Pope Leo XIII in 1902.
- Jan Zamoyski (1912–2002), 1912–2002
- Stanisław Albrecht Radziwiłł, 1914–1976
- Sophie Moss, 1917-2009
- Michel Poniatowski, 1922-2002
- Pawel Czartoryski, 1924–1999
- Ewa Theresa Żeleńska Korab-Karpinska, 1925-2011
- Anna Branicka-Wolska, 1924-2023
- Elena Poniatowska, b.1932
- Beata Tyszkiewicz, b.1938
- Tatiana Radziwill, 1939-2025
- Adam Karol Czartoryski, b.1940
- Marcin Zamoyski, b.1947
- Adam Zamoyski, b.1949
- Axel Poniatowski, b.1951
- Róża Thun, b.1954
- Konstanty Radziwiłł, b.1958
- Hubert Taczanowski, b.1960 cinematographer
- Maciej Radziwiłł, b.1961
- Jerzy Szymczyk-Ossoliński, b. 1961
- Alexi Lubomirski, b.1975
- Sebastian Waldemar Wierzbicki, h, Nieczuja, Kraków, b.1976
- Tamara Czartoryska, b.1978
- Jan Lubomirski-Lanckoroński, b.1978
- Mikołaj Rey, b.1981
- Anna Czartoryska-Niemczycka, b.1984
- Casimir Szymczyk-Ossoliński von Siemens, b. 1986
- Walter Everest Stojash z Ostoja, b.1987
- Ferdinand Szymczyk-Ossoliński von Siemens, b. 1990
- Sebastian Szymczyk-Ossoliński von Siemens, b. 1996
- Alexander Szymczyk-Ossoliński von Siemens, b. 2001

== Fictional nobles ==
- Characters from Henryk Sienkiewicz's The Trilogy: Onufry Zagłoba, Andrzej Kmicic, Jan Skrzetuski, Michał Wołodyjowski
- Pan Twardowski

== See also ==
- List of Polish titled nobility
- List of Poles
- List of Polish coats of arms
- List of Polish rulers
