= Adam Wiśniowiecki =

Polish–Lithuanian noble (c. 1566 – 1622)

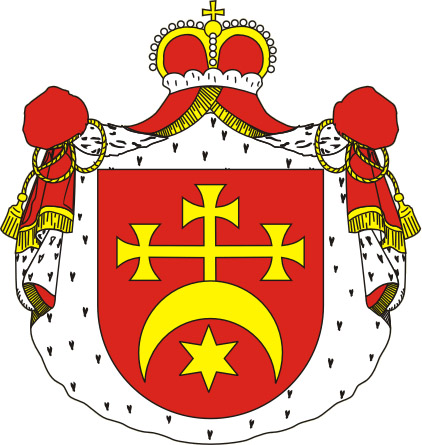
- Coat of arms: Korybut
- Born: 1566
- Died: 1622 (aged 55–56)
- Family: Wiśniowiecki
- Wife: Aleksandra Chodkiewicz
- Issue: Krystyna Wiśniowiecka
- Father: Aleksander Wiśniowiecki
- Mother: Aleksandra Kapuścianka

Adam Wiśniowiecki (c. 1566 – 1622) was a Polish–Lithuanian nobleman (szlachcic) and magnate. He supported False Dmitry I during the Time of Troubles in Russia.

Along with Konstanty Wiśniowiecki (1564–1641), he was notable for being the 'finders' of False Dmitry I.

He married Aleksandra Chodkiewicz before 1601. They had a daughter, Krystyna Wiśniowiecka, who was born in 1602.

== See also ==
- List of szlachta
