= Zygmunt Unrug =

Polish nobleman and diplomat

Zygmunt Unrug (1676–1732), also known as Sigismund von Unruh, was a Polish szlachta nobleman of German descent who served as a royal chamberlain, starosta, and ambassador to the Kingdom of Prussia during the period of Stanisław I Leszczyński and Augustus II the Strong.

Charged with the crime of blasphemy after some of his purloined private writings were made public by his political enemies, the Protestant Unrug received refuge from Prussia's Frederick William I after being sentenced to death by the Polish-Lithuanian authorities in 1715. Unrug, who, remained committed to clearing his name during his period abroad, was able to secure support from the Papacy and the Sorbonne; a decade later, the original verdict of guilt was finally rejected by the Diet of Grodno.

== Biography ==
A szlachta nobleman by birth, Unrug was born in Międzychód in 1676, one of the twelve children and six sons of Gniezno and Wałcz starosta Krzysztof Unrug (Christoph von Unrug) and his wife Bogumiła Jaskólecka. A Protestant (member of the Bohemian Brethren), with German-Polish roots dating back to the 16th century, the privileged Zygmunt Unrug received a Polish education before attending a nearby German university at Frankfurt on the Oder, and rose to become a starosta and a royal chamberlain.

Unrug was notably sent as an ambassador to Prussia's Frederick William I, in 1708, shortly before Stanisław's replacement by King Augustus II the Strong.

The well-read and philosophically-inclined Unrug spent a considerable amount of his time poring over the works of various writers and setting down his own ideas privately. Purloined from Unrug's closet, these notes fell into the hands of another nobleman, Andrzej Potocki – a political enemy who had earlier stood opposite Unrug during the earlier conflict between Stanisław I Leszczyński and Augustus II the Strong. With Potocki's uproar about allegedly blasphemous passages in Unrug's collection of notes, the matter quickly became an affair for the Polish-Lithuanian tribunal at Piotrków.

The deliberations carried out at the tribunal returned a verdict confirming Unrug's guilt for the alleged blasphemy. Unrug's insistent protestations of innocence were disregarded; the tribunal ordered the confiscation of Unrug's property (some of it going to Potocki), as well as the burning of the offending notebook – while Unrug himself was sentenced to death by burning after having his tongue torn out and his right hand cut off. Unrug's timely escape rendered the full execution of the sentence impossible, as Protestant monarch Frederick William granted Unrug his protection in Berlin.

Unrug remained committed to clearing his name during his period abroad. Already supported by Protestants, he was able to secure support from the highest Catholic authority, the Pope, who rejected the original ruling on the basis of the incompetence of the court, as well as from the influential scholars at the Sorbonne, who also rejected the Piotrków verdict. The original sentence was finally rescinded by the Diet of Grodno in 1726, which ordered that the property earlier seized from Unrug be returned to him.

Zygmunt Unrug died in 1732.

Unrug's life and the nature of his historic blasphemy case was documented by influential Polish writer Aleksander Kraushar (Alexander Kraushar) in his two-volume Sprawa Zygmunta Unruga: epizod historyczny z czasów saskich, 1715-1740, first published in Kraków (Austrian Poland) in 1890.
