= Adam Karol Czartoryski =

Polish and Spanish aristocrat

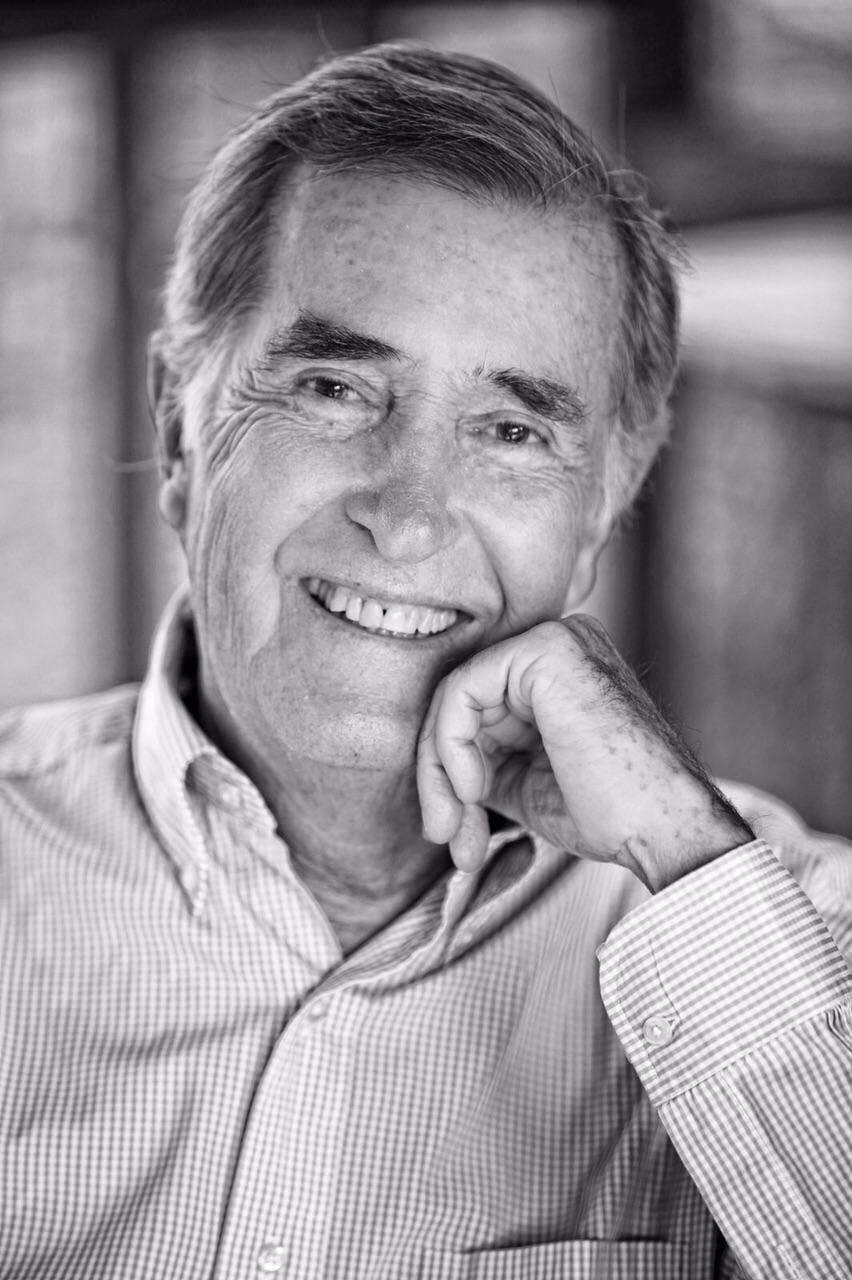
- Czartoryski in 2024

- Coat of arms
- Born: 2 January 1940 (age 86); Seville, Spain
- Noble family: Czartoryski, Spanish royal family, House of Orléans
- Spouse: Nora Picciotto (m. 1977; div. 1986)
- Issue: Tamara Czartoryska
- Father: Augustyn Józef Czartoryski
- Mother: Princess María de los Dolores of Bourbon-Two Sicilies

Prince Adam Karol Czartoryski (Polish: [ˈadam ˈkarɔl t͡ʂartɔˈrɨskʲi]; Spanish: Adán Carlos, IPA: [aˈðaŋ ˈkaɾlos t͡ʃaɾtoˈriski] born 2 January 1940) is a Polish and Spanish aristocrat who is head of the Polish-Lithuanian House of Czartoryski. He is related to both the Spanish royal family (House of Bourbon-Anjou) and to France's House of Orléans. In 2016, he sold the family art collection held in the Czartoryski Museum to the Polish state for approximately €100 million.

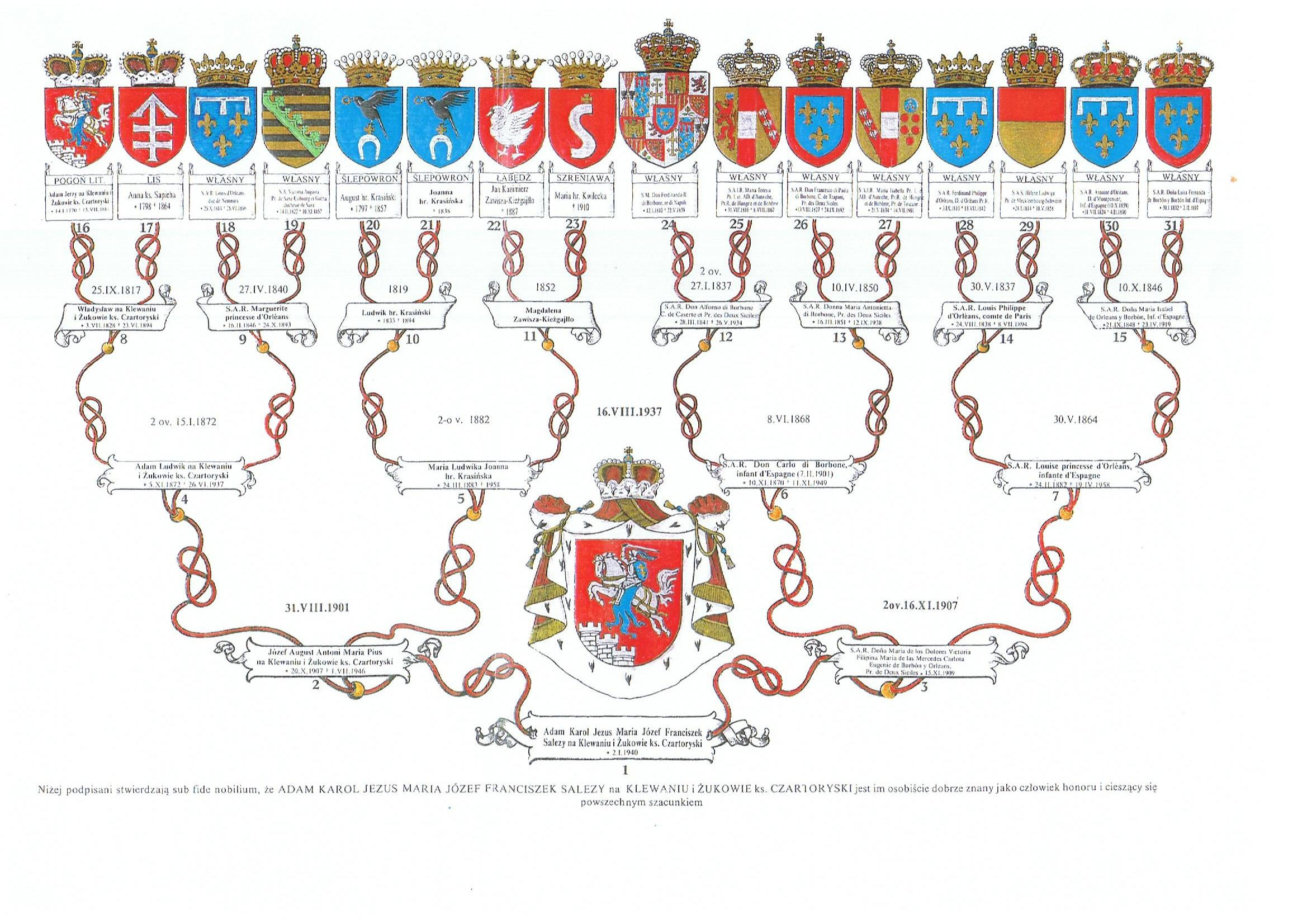
Family tree

== Early life and education ==
Adam Karol Czartoryski was born on 2 January 1940, in Seville. He is the son of Prince Augustyn Józef Czartoryski (1907–1946) and his wife, Princess María de los Dolores of Bourbon-Two Sicilies. Through his mother, he is the first cousin of King Juan Carlos I of Spain. He is the head of the Polish House of Czartoryski, descendants of Gediminas (died 1341), ruler of the Grand Duchy of Lithuania. The Czartoryski rose to power under August Aleksander Czartoryski (1697–1782) of the Klewa line, who married Countess Zofia von Dönhoff, the only heir to the Sieniawski family. The Czartoryski and the Potocki were the two most influential aristocratic families of the last decades of the Polish–Lithuanian Commonwealth (1569–1795).

At the start of World War II (1939–1945) the Germans occupied Poland in September 1939. The Gestapo arrested Prince Augustyn and Princess Dolores, who was pregnant with Prince Adam Karol. Through their connections to Italian and Spanish royalty they arranged to be deported to Spain. Adam Karol Czartoryski was born on 2 January 1940 in Seville, Spain. Adam Karol's brother Ludwik Piotr was born in 1945. Prince Augustyn and Ludwik Piotr both died in 1946 and were buried in the crypt of the Silesian Church in Seville.

Adam Karol Czartoryski was educated in Spain and then in England. He lived in Ireland for a while, where he became a professional race car driver and an enthusiast of karate. He was a great admirer of Hawaiian Kenpō grand master Ed Parker. He trained in Kenpō Karate with John McSweeney, a pupil of Ed Parker. Returning to his native Spain at the end of the sixties, Czartoryski continued his Karate training under the guidance of Japanese Sensei Yasunari Ishimi. He reached the 5th Dan of karate.

== Career ==
Czartoryski was director of several international karate organizations. He also supported conventional wrestling and judo. In 1976 the Chinese government gave sports medals to Adam Czartoryski Bourbon and Fernando Compte, president of the Spanish Wrestling Association. In 1982 Czartoryski was elected vice-president of the World Karate Federation and the European Karate Federation. In 1984 he was a member of the Spanish Olympic Committee (COE) for karate by virtue of his positions in the karate federations. As of 2020 he was honorary president of the International Budo Academy, which trains teachers of martial arts (Budō).

In 1974 Czartoryski became head trustee of the Polish Dzialynska Trust, set up by his family in Norwich, England in 1899 to support Polish students in the United Kingdom and in Poland. On 25 January 1977 he married Nora de Picciotto in London. Their daughter Tamara Laura Czartoryska was born on 25 April 1978. The couple divorced in 1986.

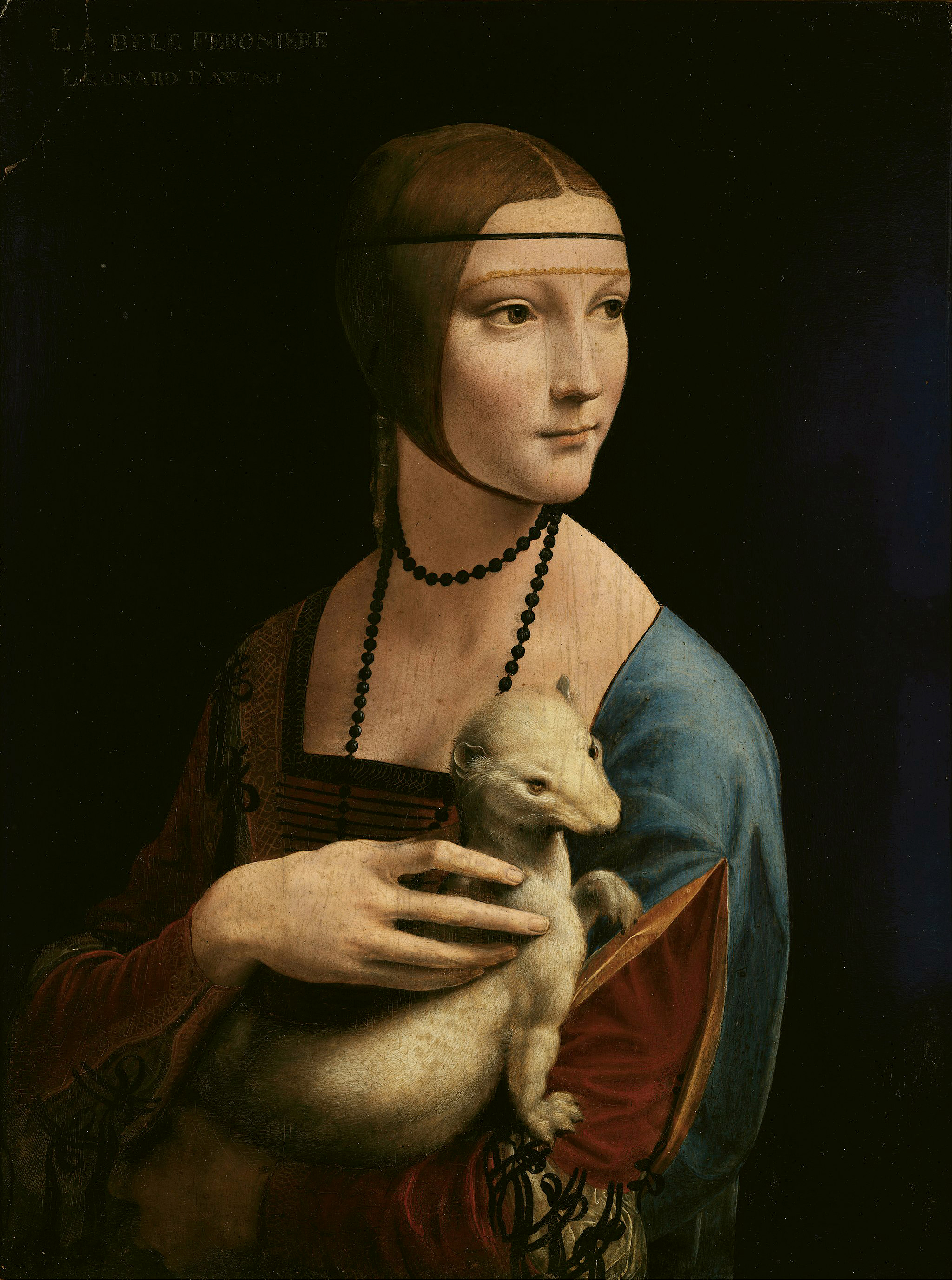
Lady with ermine by Leonardo da Vinci, the most famous of the works in the Czartoryski Collection

In 1989, after the fall of the Polish People's Republic, Czartoryski was able to visit Poland for the first time. In 1991 the Republic of Poland recognized him for his philanthropy and awarded him the Commander’s Cross with Star of the Order of Polonia Restituta. That year the Polish government restored ownership of the family art collection and library to Czartoryski. It had been managed by the National Museum of Poland in Kraków, which continued to manage the collection. In 1992 Czartoryski represented Poland at the opening of "Circa 1492: Art in the Age of Exploration" at the National Gallery of Art in Washington, D.C. Later that year he was in charge of the Polish Pavilion at the Seville Expo '92.

In 1997 Czartoryski noticed the sale at Sotheby's of a painting by the Dutch artist Jan Mostaert named Portrait of a Lady, Presumably Anne of Bretagne, which he claimed to have come from his family's looted art collection. The owner said his mother had bought the painting in the 1950s for $6,000 from a reputable New York art gallery. A legal battle started to determine the rightful owner.

Czartoryski's mother, Princess María de los Dolores, died in Madrid in 1996. On 12 December 2000 in London he married Josette Calil. In December 2016 he sold the Czartoryski collection to the Polish state at an extremely low price in a transaction that drew some criticism and resulted in legal battles.

== Czartoryski collection sale ==
The Czartoryski collection was started in 1796 by Adam Karol Czartoryski's ancestor, Princess Izabela Czartoryska, a liberal progressive who corresponded with Voltaire, Jean-Jacques Rousseau and Benjamin Franklin. The original goal was to preserve Poland's cultural heritage, but later objects from around the world were added, including items looted from the camp of the Ottoman Sultan after the 1683 Battle of Vienna. Izabela's descendants added works from Greece, Rome, Egypt and Japan. In 1798 Prince Adam Jerzy Czartoryski, Izabela's son, visited Italy where he bought Leonardo da Vinci's Lady with an Ermine and Raphael's Portrait of a young man. Rembrandt's Landscape with the Good Samaritan is the third of the "big three" works in the collection.

By 1939 the collection had 5,000 paintings, statues and other antiquities. When the Germans invaded Poland that year, Augustyn Józef Czartoryski had the most valuable items hidden beneath the baroque Sieniawski family castle, while others were stored in the cellar of the museum. However the Germans found the collection and the works were taken to various locations in Germany. After the war the Polish representative at the Allies Commission for the Retrieval of Works of Art found many of the stolen paintings and claimed them for the Czartoryski Museum. The Portrait of a Young Man was not recovered. The museum became a branch of the National Museum of Poland in Kraków. The collection now included 86,000 artworks and 250,000 books and other manuscripts.

In London in the late 1960s Adam Karol Czartoryski met Professor Marek Rostworowski, who had been appointed in 1965 as director of the Czartoryski Collection in Poland. In 1991 Professor Rostworowski was appointed Minister of Culture. That year the High Court restored the Czartoryski Museum and Library and their contents to Czartoryski, who set up the Princes Czartoryski Foundation to manage the collection. The National Museum continued to maintain and administer the collection, renting the buildings from the foundation.

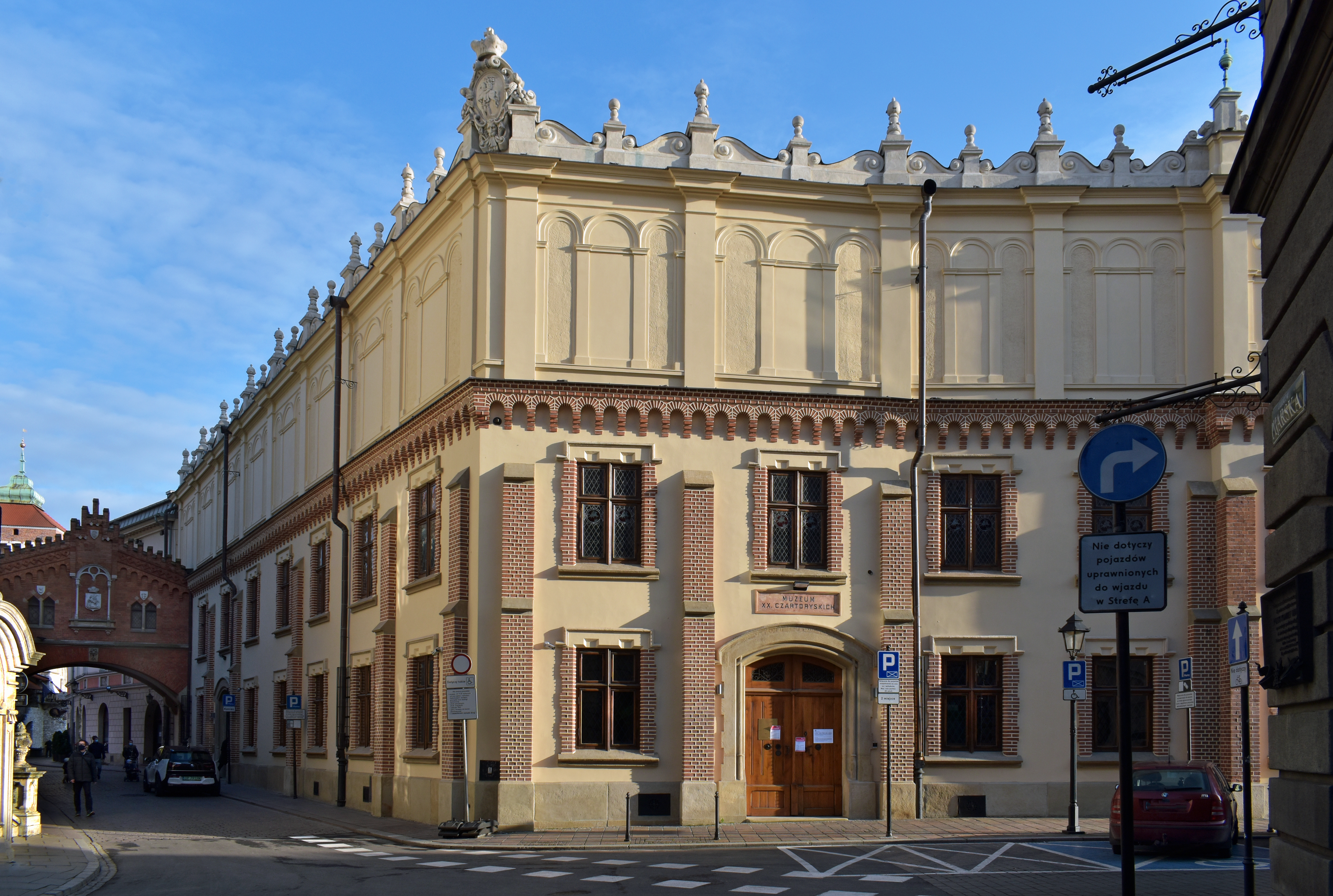
Czartoryski Palace, Princes Czartoryski Museum in Kraków

The Princes Czartoryski Museum in Kraków was closed for extensive renovations in 2010, including adding a glass and steel roof to a courtyard that was not being used. The foundation obtained funding for the works from Norway Grants, local and national government authorities and loans to foreign exhibitions of the Lady with an Ermine, but by the end of 2016 had run out of money, while the project would cost about €6.9 million to complete. Czartoryski decided to entrust his collection to the Polish Nation, including the Lady With An Ermine, Landscape with the Good Samaritan and works by Pierre-Auguste Renoir.

The agreement to sell the collection to the Polish state for €100 million was signed on 29 December 2016. The deputy prime minister and minister of culture, Piotr Gliński, signed on behalf of the Republic of Poland. The purchase price was far below the estimated value of $2 billion. Despite this, the state's purchase was criticized on the grounds that the money could have been better spent to preserve threatened Polish heritage sites, such as derelict manor houses.

By law, the Czartoryski Collection could anyway not leave the country without authorization by the government. The artworks would not be moved. Most of them were in the National Museum in Kraków, apart from Da Vinci's Lady With an Ermine, which was in the Wawel Royal Castle in Kraków. It was expected that the museum would be ready to reopen by 2019.

The management board of the Czartoryski Foundation complained that they had not been consulted over the sale, and resigned. They said it might be illegal, since the statute establishing the foundation said the collection was nontransferable and indivisible. One of the board members expressed concern that the collection might eventually by broken up and sold to private owners. The endowment was challenged by Czartoryski's daughter, Tamara, and in 2018 resulted in a lawsuit between Adam Karol and his daughter.

== Ancestry ==
Ancestors of Adam Karol Czartoryski

8. Prince Władysław Czartoryski
4. Prince Adam Ludwik Czartoryski
9. Princess Marguerite of Orléans
2. Prince Augustyn Józef Czartoryski
10. Count Ludwik Józef Krasiński
5. Countess Maria Ludwika Krasińska
11. Magdalena Zawisza-Kieżgajło
1. Prince Adam Karol Czartoryski
12. Prince Alfonso, Count of Caserta
6. Prince Carlos of Bourbon-Two Sicilies
13. Princess Maria Antonietta of Bourbon-Two Sicilies
3. Princess Maria de los Dolores of Bourbon-Two Sicilies
14. Prince Philippe, Count of Paris
7. Princess Louise of Orléans
15. Princess Marie Isabelle of Orléans

== Sources ==
- "Prince Adam Karol Czartoryski". Czartoryski. 2019-09-25. Archived from the original on 2019-09-25 – via Wayback Machine.
- "Prince Agustyn Joseph Czartoryski", Czartoryski, archived from the original on 2018-01-26 – via Wayback Machine
- frebault, "Adam Karol Czartoryski", Geneanet
- "Events from day to day", Taiwan Today, 1 April 1976
- Gazur, Łukasz (16 May 2018), "Nowe fakty w sprawie Czartoryskich. Adam Karol Czartoryski pozywa córkę Tamarę. Ona ujawnia nowe informacje", Dziennik Polski (in Polish)
- Hodge, Nicholas (27 February 2017), "What the sale of the Czartoryski collection says about Poland today", Apollo Magazine
- Kowalski, Mariusz (2013), Księstwa Rzeczpospolitej: państwo magnackie jako region polityczny (in Polish), IGiPZ PAN Polska Akademia Nauk. Instytut Geografii i Przestrzennego Zagospodarowania im. Stanisława Leszczyckiego, ISBN 978-83-61590-27-9
- Martin, Guy (December 30, 2016), "How $2 Billion in Old Masters, including Da Vinci's 'Lady With An Ermine,' Gets To Stay in Poland", Forbes
- Martínez-Fornés, Almudena (6 May 2015), "Don Juan Carlos se reencuentra con sus maestros de karate, pioneros en España", Diario ABC (in Spanish)
- Mora, Juan (10 June 1984), "El COE, un organismo muy singular", El País (in Spanish), Madrid
- "Tamara Czartoryska poszła z rodziną na wojnę. Ojciec starszy córkę procesem", Newsweek.pl (in Polish), 26 April 2018
- Portrait of a Young Man, Universal Museum of Art
- Rolak, Raymond (5 January 2017), "Princes Czartoryski Art Collection Sold to Polish Government; Value Estimated at More than $2B", CNBNEWS/Gloucester City, CNBNewsnet
- Rydell, Anders (2 October 2014), Hitlers Bilder: Kunstraub der Nazis - Raubkunst in der Gegenwart (in German), Campus Verlag, ISBN 978-3-593-50163-5
- Szymański, Damian (13 May 2018), "Adam Czartoryski nie wytrzymał. Składa pozew przeciwko córce Tamarze. "Zrobił to z ciężkim sercem"", Business Insider (in Polish)
- Weiser, Benjamin (3 May 1997), "Prince vs. Professor in a Legal Battle Over a Painting", New York Times
- Who We Are, International Budo Academy
- "Nienawidzi Polski i Polaków. Tamara Czartoryska pozwana przez ojca", TVP.info (in Polish), 14 May 2018
