= Princess Małgorzata Izabela Czartoryska =

Princess of Bourbon-Two Sicilies

Princess Malgorzata Izabella Czartoryska
- Princess Gabriel of Bourbon-Two Sicilies
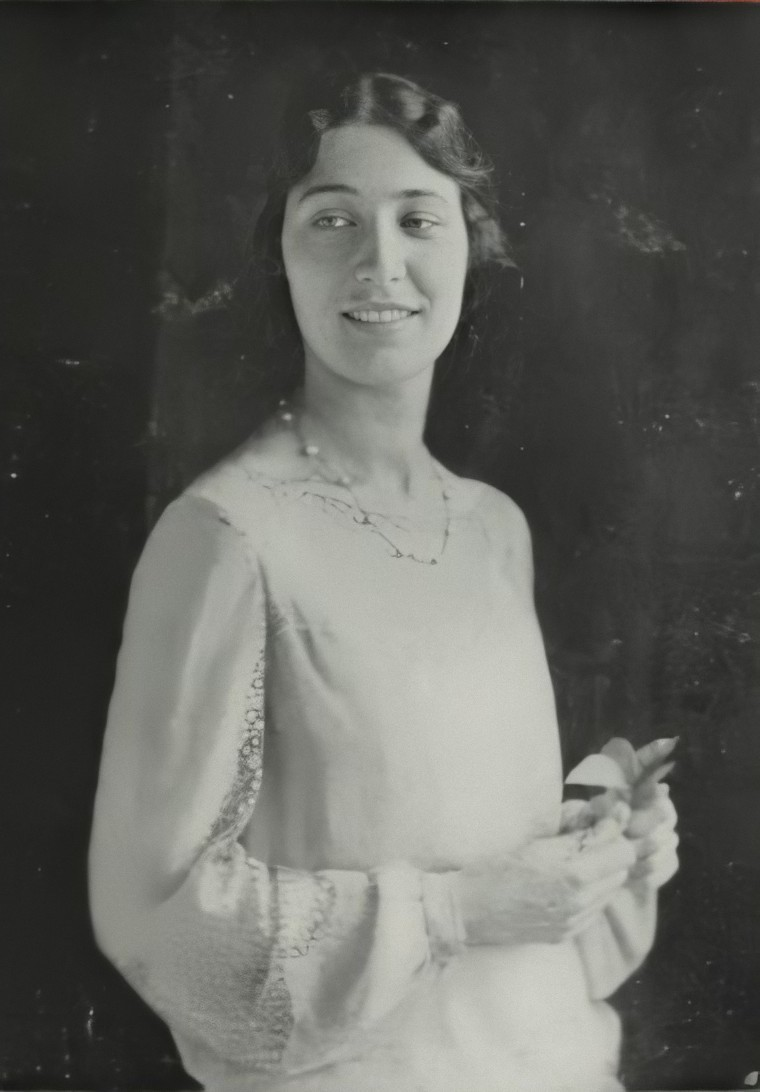
- Małgorta Izabela in 1924
- Born: 17 August 1902; Warsaw, Kingdom of Poland
- Died: 8 March 1929 (aged 26); Cannes, French Republic
- Spouse: Prince Gabriel of Bourbon-Two Sicilies (m. 1927)
- Issue: Prince Antoine
Names
- Polish: Małgorzata Izabella Maria Magdalena Antonina Hiacynta Józefina Ludwika
- House: Czartoryski
- Father: Prince Adam Ludwik Czartoryski
- Mother: Countess Maria Ludwika Krasińska

Princess Malgorzata Izabella Maria Magdalene Antoinette Hyacinthe Josephe Luise Marie Czartoryska (Polish: Małgorzata Izabella Maria Magdalena Antonina Hiacynta Józefina Ludwika Czartoryska; 17 August 1902, Warsaw, Kingdom of Poland – 8 March 1929, Cannes, French Republic) was a princess of the House of Czartoryski by birth. Through her marriage to Prince Gabriel of Bourbon-Two Sicilies, Malgorzata Izabella was a Princess of the House of Bourbon-Two Sicilies.

== Family ==
Malgorzata Izabella was the eldest child of Prince Adam Ludwik Czartoryski and his wife Countess Maria Ludwika Krasińska. Through her father, Malgorzata Izabella was a great-great-granddaughter of Louis-Philippe I, King of the French and Maria Amalia of the Two Sicilies. Malgorzata Izabella's younger brother Prince Augustyn Józef Czartoryski married her niece, Princess Maria de los Dolores of Bourbon-Two Sicilies.

== Marriage and issue ==
Malgorzata Izabella married Prince Gabriel of Bourbon-Two Sicilies, twelfth child and youngest son of Prince Alfonso of Bourbon-Two Sicilies, Count of Caserta and his wife Princess Antonietta of Bourbon-Two Sicilies, on 25 August 1927 in Paris. Malgorzata Izabella and Gabriel had one son:

- Prince Antoine Marie Joseph Alphonse Adam of Bourbon-Two Sicilies (born 20 January 1929 in Cannes – died 11 November 2019)

∞ Duchess Elisabeth of Württemberg (born 2 February 1933 in Stuttgart – died 29 January 2022) on 18 July 1958 in Altshausen

- Prince François Philipp Maria Joseph Gabriel of Bourbon-Two Sicilies (born 20 June 1960 in Ravensburg)

∞ Countess Alexandra of Schönborn-Wiesentheid (born 2 June 1967 in Zürich) on 2 June 2000 in Geneva

- Prince Antoine Gaetano Nicolas Istvan Marie of Bourbon-Two Sicilies (born 6 June 2003 in Geneva)
- Princess Dorothée Maria Amalia Tatiana Hélène of Bourbon-Two Sicilies (born 10 May 2005 in Zürich)

- Princess Maria Carolina Johanna Rosa Cecilia of Bourbon-Two Sicilies (born 18 July 1962 in Friedrichshafen)

∞ Andreas Baumbach (born 30 April 1963 in Tübingen) on 6 May 1988 in Tübingen

- Prince Gennaro Maria Pio Casimir of Bourbon-Two Sicilies (born 27 January 1966 in Ravensburg)
- Princess Maria Annunziata Urraca Margarita Elisabeth of Bourbon-Two Sicilies (born 4 March 1973 in Friedrichshafen)

∞ Count Carl Fredrik Creutz (born 1 November 1971) on 2 August 2003 in Helsinki

== Ancestry ==
Ancestors of Princess Małgorzata Izabela Czartoryska

8. Prince Adam Jerzy Czartoryski
4. Prince Władysław Czartoryski
9. Princess Anna Zofia Sapieha
2. Prince Adam Ludwik Czartoryski
10. Louis, Duke of Nemours
5. Princess Marguerite Adelaide of Orléans
11. Princess Victoria of Saxe-Coburg and Gotha
1. Princess Malgorzata Izabella Czartoryska
12. Count August Krasiński
6. Count Ludwik Józef Krasiński
13. Countess Joanna Krasińska
3. Countess Maria Ludwika Krasińska
14. Count Jan Kazimierz Zawisza-Kierżgajło
7. Maria Magdalena Zawisza-Kierżgajło
15. Countess Maria Kwilecka
