= Władysław Czartoryski =

Polish noble and political activist (1828–1894)

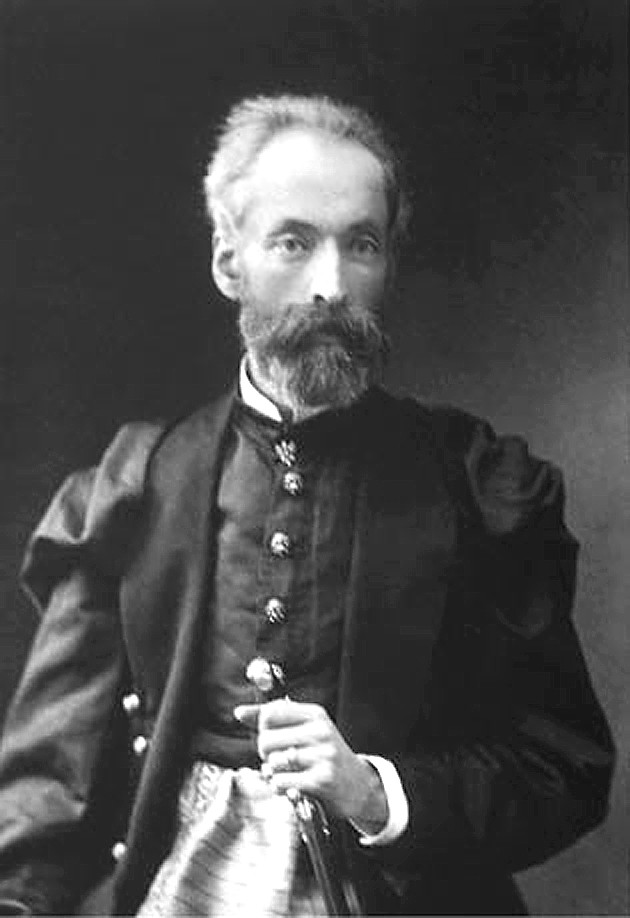
- Coat of arms: Czartoryski coat of arms
- Born: 3 July 1828; Warsaw, Congress Poland
- Died: 23 June 1894 (aged 65); Boulogne-Billancourt, France
- Noble family: Czartoryski
- Spouses: María Amparo Muñoz, 1st Countess of Vista Alegre (m. 1855; died 1864) Princess Marguerite Adelaide of Orléans (m. 1872; died 1893)
- Issue: August Czartoryski; Adam Ludwik Czartoryski; Witold Kazimierz Czartoryski
- Father: Adam Jerzy Czartoryski
- Mother: Anna Zofia Sapieha

Prince Władysław (Ladislaus) Czartoryski (3 July 1828 – 23 June 1894) was a Polish noble, political activist in exile, collector of art, and founder of the Czartoryski Museum in Kraków.

== Early life ==
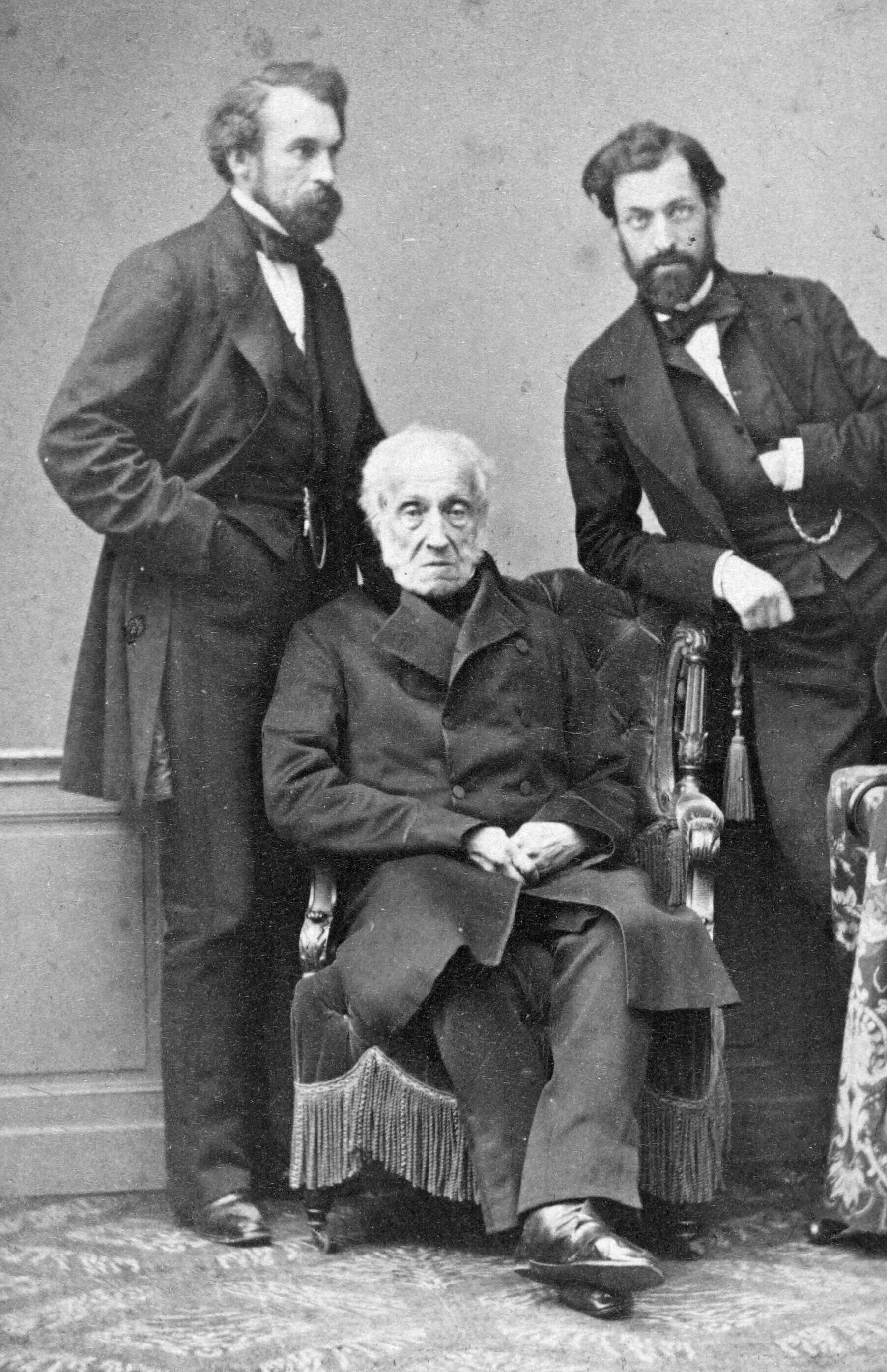
Władysław Czartoryski (right) with his brother (left) and father (seated), 1860

Czartoryski was born in Warsaw, Congress Poland, on 3 July 1828. He was a son of Prince Adam Jerzy Czartoryski and Princess Anna Zofia Sapieha. His father began his political career as a Foreign Minister to the Russian Tsar Alexander I after Poland was partitioned by Russia, Prussia and Austria. He later became the 1st President of the Polish National Government in exile and a bitter opponent of Alexander's successor, Tsar Nicholas I. His elder brother was Prince Witold Czartoryski and his younger sister was Princess Izabella Elżbieta Czartoryska, who married Count Jan Kanty Działyński (son of Tytus Działyński).

His paternal grandparents were Prince Adam Kazimierz Czartoryski and Izabela Flemming. His maternal grandparents were Prince Aleksander Antoni Sapieha and Anna Zamoyska.

== Career ==
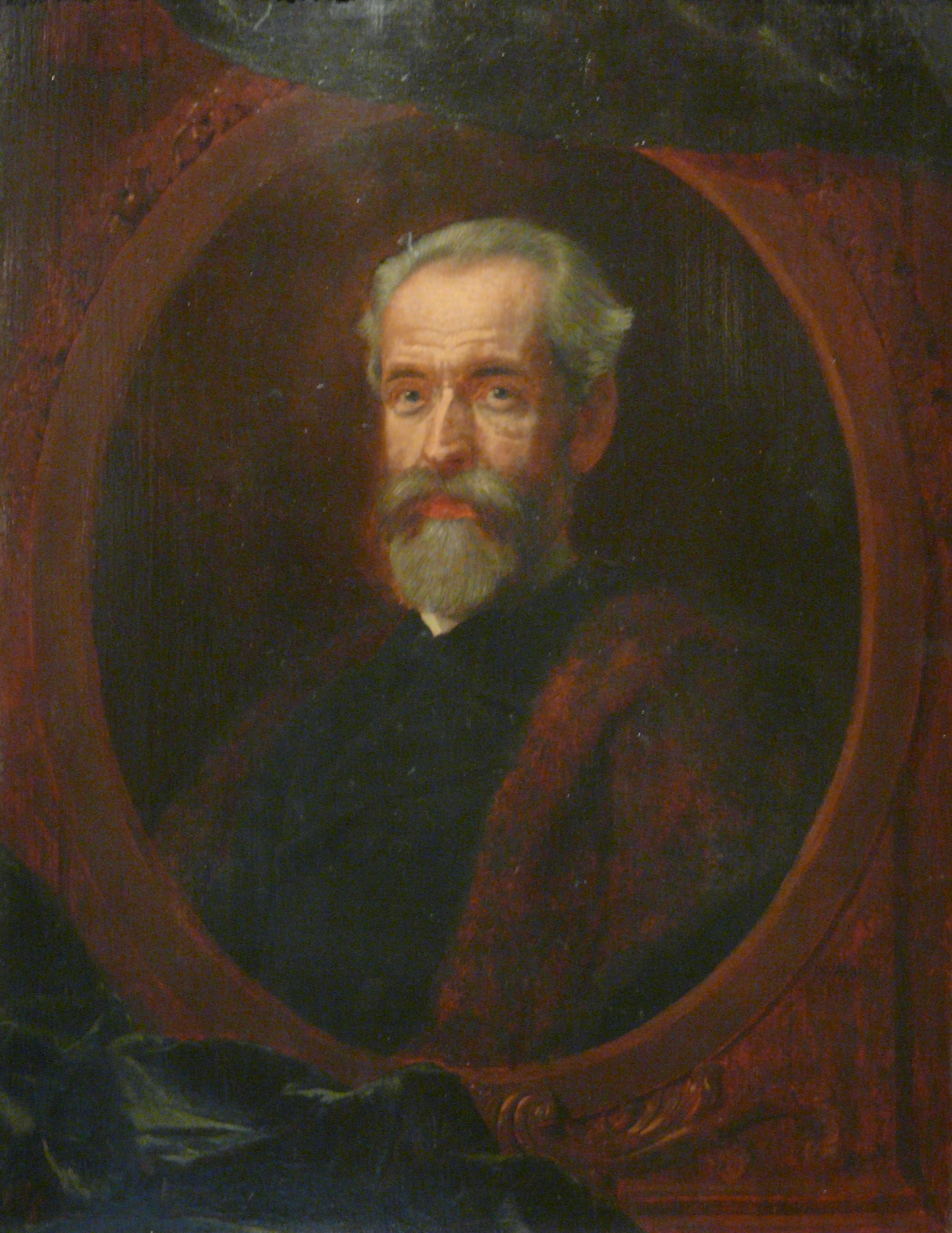
Portrait of Władysław Czartoryski

Czartoryski was an activist of the Hotel Lambert. From 1863 to 1864, he was the main diplomatic agent of the revolutionary National Government (Rząd Narodowy) with the English, Italian, Swedish and Turkish governments.

Czartoryski was also owner of the family's outstanding collection of art: paintings, sculptures and antiquities. He was greatly interested in Egyptian art, making his purchases at sales in Paris and directly in Egypt. He donated some objects to the Polish Library in Paris and also other archaeological artifacts to the Jagellonian University. In 1871, he donated objects to the Polish Museum in Rapperswil, Switzerland.

In 1865, Czartoryski organized an exhibition of the "Czartoryski Collection" in the "Polish Room" of the Exposition des Arts Decoratifs in Paris. In 1878, he reopened the Czartoryski Museum in Kraków, founded by his grandmother Izabela Czartoryska in 1801 in Puławy but closed after the November Uprising.

Czartoryski hoped that his eldest son would pursue a diplomatic career, however, Gucio went against his father's wishes and joined the religious order of the Salesians. Gucio was ordained a priest in 1893, but neither his father nor anyone else in the family attended the ceremony, and he died in 1894, aged 34, of tuberculosis. He was beatified in 2004.

== Personal life ==
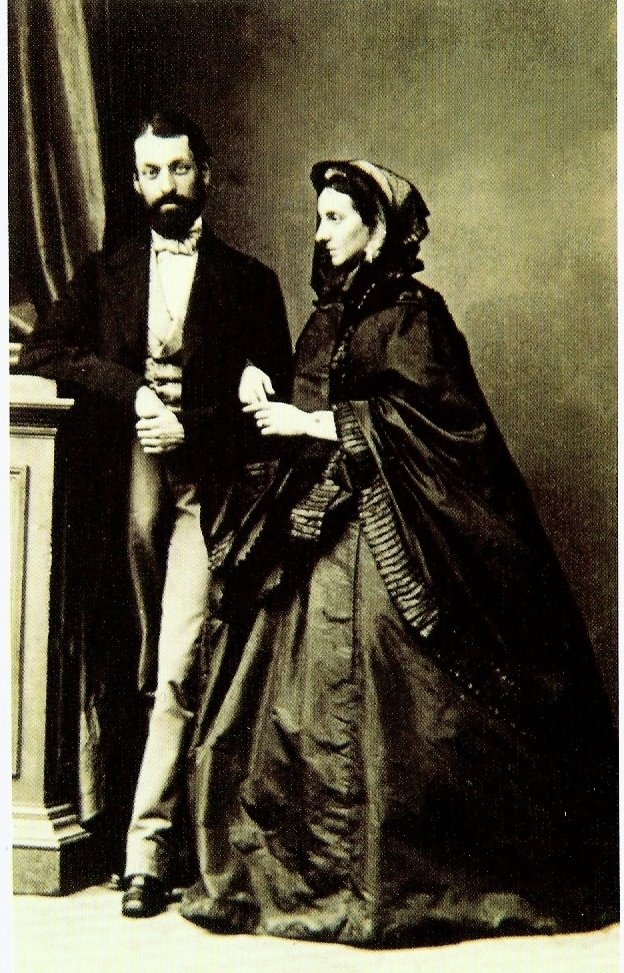
Photograph of Czartoryski and his first wife, c. 1860s.

On 1 March 1855, Czartoryski married María Amparo Muñoz, 1st Countess of Vista Alegre, in Malmaison near Paris. She was a daughter of Queen Maria Christina of Spain by her morganatic second marriage to Agustín Fernando Muñoz, Duke of Riánsares. They lived at the Hôtel Lambert, the Czartoryski family's base of operations during the Second French Empire. Before her death from tuberculosis in 1864, they were the parents of:

- Blessed August "Gucio" Czartoryski (1858–1893), who contracted tuberculosis at the age of six from his mother, who died soon thereafter; his tutor was Joseph Kalinowski (who became Saint Raphael) and he joined the religious order of the Salesians.

On 15 January 1872, Czartoryski married his second wife, Princess Marguerite Adelaide of Orléans, daughter of the Duke of Nemours and granddaughter of King Louis-Philippe of France, with whom he had two more sons:

- Adam Ludwik Czartoryski (1872–1937), who married Countess Maria Ludwika Krasińska, a daughter of Princess Madeleine Radziwiłł.
- Witold Kazimierz Czartoryski (1876–1911), who left his estate to his elder brother.

He died on 23 June 1894, aged 65, in Boulogne-Billancourt, and was buried in the Sieniawa family crypt.

== See also ==
- List of Poles
