= Princess Marguerite of Orléans (1846–1893) =

Princess Czartoryska

- Princess Małgorzata Adelajda Maria Czartoryska
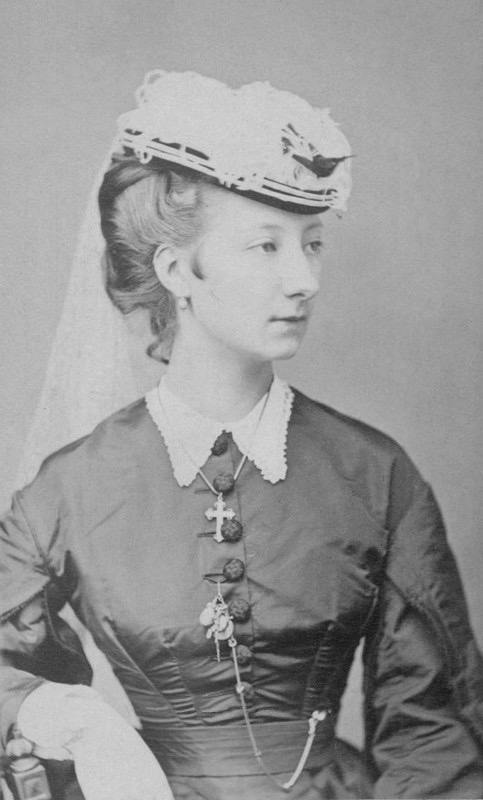
- Marguerite in the early 1870s
- Born: 16 February 1846; Pavillon de Marsan, Tuileries Palace, Paris, Kingdom of France
- Died: 24 October 1893 (aged 47); Paris, French Republic
- Spouse: Prince Władysław Czartoryski (m. 1872)
- Issue: Prince Adam Ludwik Czartoryski; Prince Witold Kazimierz Czartoryski
Names
- French: Marguerite Adélaïde Marie
- House: Orléans
- Father: Prince Louis, Duke of Nemours
- Mother: Princess Victoria of Saxe-Coburg and Gotha

Princess Marguerite Adélaïde Marie of Orléans, French: Marguerite d'Orléans, Polish: Małgorzata Orleańska, (16 February 1846 – 24 October 1893) was a member of the House of Orléans and a Princess of France by birth. Through her marriage to Prince Władysław Czartoryski, Marguerite was a princess of the House of Czartoryski by marriage.

== Early life ==
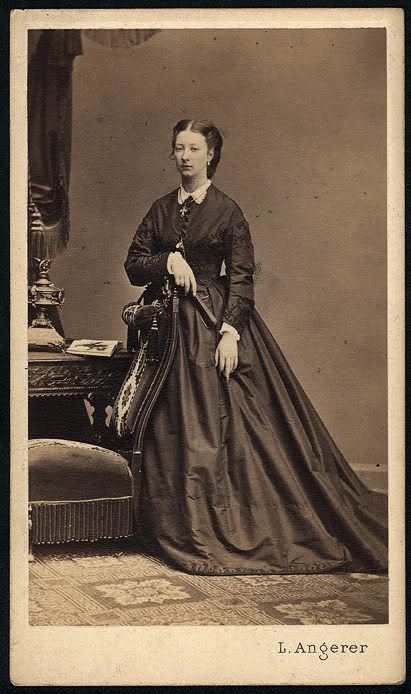
Princess Marguerite Czartoryska, (1870s)

Marguerite was the third child of Prince Louis, Duke of Nemours and his wife Princess Victoria of Saxe-Coburg and Gotha.

On 17 February 1846, the day after her birth, she was baptized at the Tuileries Palace in Paris and held at the baptismal font by her paternal uncle François of Orléans, Prince of Joinville, and by her paternal great-aunt Princess Adélaïde of Orléans.

She lived in Bushy House after the death of her grandmother, Queen Maria Amalia who received the house after the death of Queen Adelaide; then her father inherited after the death of her grandmother.

In 1865, Marguerite became romantically involved with her first cousin, Louis of Orléans, Prince of Condé, but the young man's premature death the following year put an end to their plans.

== Marriage and issue ==
Princess Marguerite Adélaïde Marie d'Orleans married Prince Władysław Czartoryski, second son of Prince Adam Jerzy Czartoryski and his wife, Princess Anna Zofia Sapieha, on 15 January 1872 in Chantilly.

His first wife was María Amparo Muñoz y Borbón, 1st Countess of Vista Alegre, eldest morganatic daughter of Queen Maria Christina of Spain and her second husband, Agustín Fernando Muñoz y Sánchez, Duke of Riánsares, who died in 1864 leaving Władysław a widower with one infant son, Prince August Czartoryski.

Together, Marguerite and Władysław had two sons:

- Prince Adam Ludwik Czartoryski, Duke of Klewan and Zukow (5 November 1872 – 29 June 1937); married an heiress, Countess Maria Ludwika Krasińska and had issue, including Princess Malgorzata Izabella Czartoryska, the wife of Prince Gabriel of Bourbon-Two Sicilies, and Prince Augustyn Józef Czartoryski, the husband of Princess María de los Dolores of Bourbon-Two Sicilies
- Prince Witold Kazimierz Czartoryski (10 March 1876 – 29 October 1911); unmarried, died in Versailles, Paris, France

== Death ==
Princess Marguerite died on 24 October 1893, aged 47, at the Hôtel Lambert, her residence in Paris. According to the St James's Gazette, she had suffered from tuberculosis for several years and had withdrawn from Parisian society, devoting herself instead to the care of her two sons, Adam and Witold.

During the winter and spring of 1893, Marguerite stayed in San Remo, where her health continued to deteriorate. She subsequently spent the summer at a sanatorium near Frankfurt. By the time she was brought back to Paris, she was reportedly in a critical condition. On the evening of 24 October, her condition briefly improved enough for her to take some nourishment. She was also looking forward to congratulating her father, Prince Louis, Duke of Nemours, on his eightieth birthday the following day. However, she suffered a sudden decline and died at approximately 9 p.m. in the presence of her husband and sons. Her father was summoned but arrived too late to see her before her death. Other members of the French royal family were also unable to reach the Hôtel Lambert in time.

Marguerite was initially buried at Saint-Louis-en-l'Île in Paris. Her remains and those of her husband, Władysław Czartoryski, were subsequently transferred to the Czartoryski family crypt at Sieniawa, Poland.

== Ancestry ==
Ancestors of Princess Marguerite of Orléans (1846–1893)

8. Louis Philippe II, Duke of Orléans
4. Louis Philippe I of France
9. Louise Marie Adélaïde de Bourbon
2. Prince Louis, Duke of Nemours
10. Ferdinand I of the Two Sicilies
5. Princess Maria Amalia of Naples and Sicily
11. Archduchess Maria Carolina of Austria
1. Princess Marguerite of Orléans
12. Francis, Duke of Saxe-Coburg-Saalfeld
6. Prince Ferdinand of Saxe-Coburg and Gotha
13. Countess Augusta Reuss of Ebersdorf
3. Princess Victoria of Saxe-Coburg and Gotha
14. Ferenc József, Prince Koháry de Csábrág et Szitnya
7. Princess Maria Antonia Koháry of Csábrág and Szitnya
15. Countess Maria Antonia von Waldstein
