= Elzbieta Czartoryska =

There have been two Polish noblewomen named Elzbieta Czartoryska:

- Elżbieta Czartoryska (1736–1816)
- Elżbieta Czartoryska (1905–1989)
