= Portrait of a Young Man (Raphael) =

Missing painting

- Ritratto di giovane uomo (Italian), Portret młodzieńca (Polish)
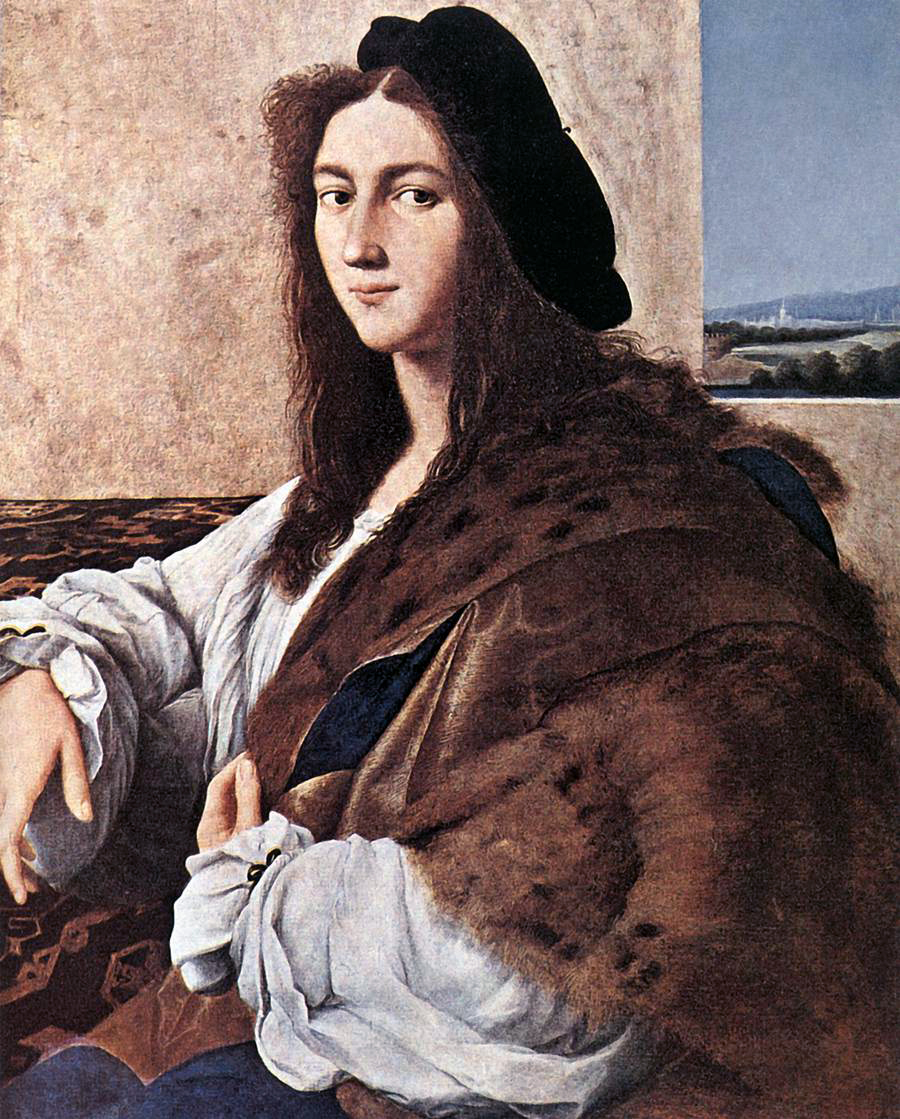
- Artificially coloured (Note: No colour photographs of the painting were taken before it disappeared; this image has been artificially coloured.)
- Artist: Raphael
- Year: 1513–1514
- Dimensions: 72 cm × 56 cm (28 in × 22 in)
- Location: whereabouts unknown since 1945 formerly exhibited at the Czartoryski Museum, Kraków, Poland

Portrait of a Young Man is a painting by Italian artist Raphael. It is often thought to be a self-portrait. During the Second World War the painting was stolen by the Nazis from Poland. Many historians regard it as the most important painting missing since World War II.

The portrait is in oil on panel, probably from 1513 to 1514, and is by the Italian High Renaissance painter and architect Raffaello Sanzio da Urbino better known simply as Raphael. The subject's identity is unverified, but many scholars have traditionally regarded it as Raphael's self-portrait. The facial features are perceived by specialists as compatible with, if not clearly identical to, the only undoubted self-portrait by Raphael in his fresco The School of Athens at the Vatican, identified as such by Vasari. If it is a self-portrait, no hint is given of Raphael's profession; the portrait shows a richly dressed and "confidently poised" young man.

== Analysis ==
As a portrait painting of the High Renaissance, Raphael's emphasis on erect poise, gesture, texture, decorous ornament, and softened form all represented cultivated Mannerist expression with the attributes of the noble class in a style which spread through southern Italy after Raphael's death. The textural details of a flesh-colored wall, sable fur, and wavy dark hair not only strike a Neo-Classical, sensitive balance between real humanity and nature, but they also extend gestures seen in previous female hand placement to stress man's role as a well-travelled humanist. Raphael humanized male gender so that the sleeve ribbon and hazy edges around both hair and landscape reflected the interchangeability of each gender. A left palm placed near the heart emphasized self-identity and a passionate stance. A striking contrast between pure white and sable intensified the doctrinal harmony between Heaven and Earth.

It is probable that Raphael's studious approach to the idealized representation of human proportion was based on his studies of ancient athletic and military heroes in Classical sculpture such as Doryphoros and Augustus of Prima Porta. The painting was brought to Poland, along with Leonardo da Vinci's Lady with an Ermine and many Roman antiquities, by Prince Adam George Czartoryski, son of Princess Izabela Czartoryska, on his travels to Italy in 1798.

== Nazi German theft ==
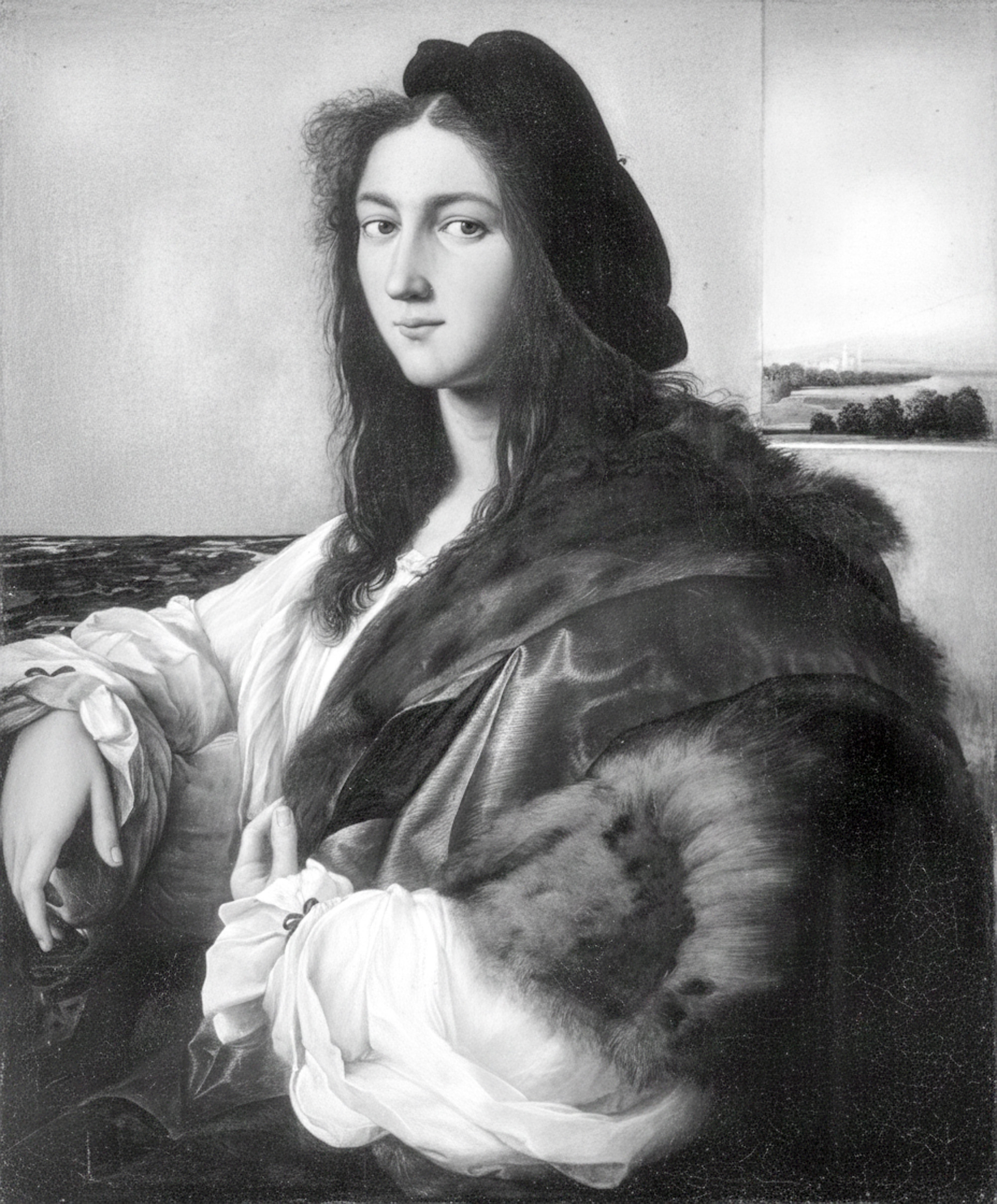
Original black and white photo image

At the onset of the Nazi German invasion of Poland in 1939, then family patriarch Prince Augustyn Józef Czartoryski rescued numerous pieces from the Czartoryski Museum, including Portrait of a Young Man, Leonardo's Lady with an Ermine and Rembrandt's masterpiece Landscape with the Good Samaritan. The collection was hidden at a residence in Sieniawa, but was later discovered by the Gestapo, working for Hans Frank, Hitler's appointee as the governor of the General Government. From the collection, these three paintings decorated Frank's residence in Kraków before they were sent to Berlin, and Dresden, to become part of Hitler's own collection at Linz, arranged by his plenipotentiary, Hans Posse.

In January 1945, Frank brought the paintings back from Germany to Kraków for his own use at the royal Wawel Castle. This is where Portrait of a Young Man was last seen. When the Germans evacuated from Kraków later that month ahead of the Soviet offensive, it is thought that Frank took the paintings with him to Silesia and then to his own villa in Neuhaus am Schliersee.. The Americans arrested Frank on May 3, 1945, pending trial for extensive war crimes (he was executed in 1946). The Polish representative at the Allies Commission for the Retrieval of Works of Art located some of the paintings stolen by him, and claimed them on behalf of the Czartoryski Museum. However, Portrait of a Young Man and 843 other artifacts were missing from storage. Lynn H. Nicholas suggested in The Rape of Europa, her 1994 book on Nazi plunder, that if the painting were to reappear, it would be worth in excess of US$100 million (equivalent to $217.22 million in 2025).

== Unknown whereabouts ==
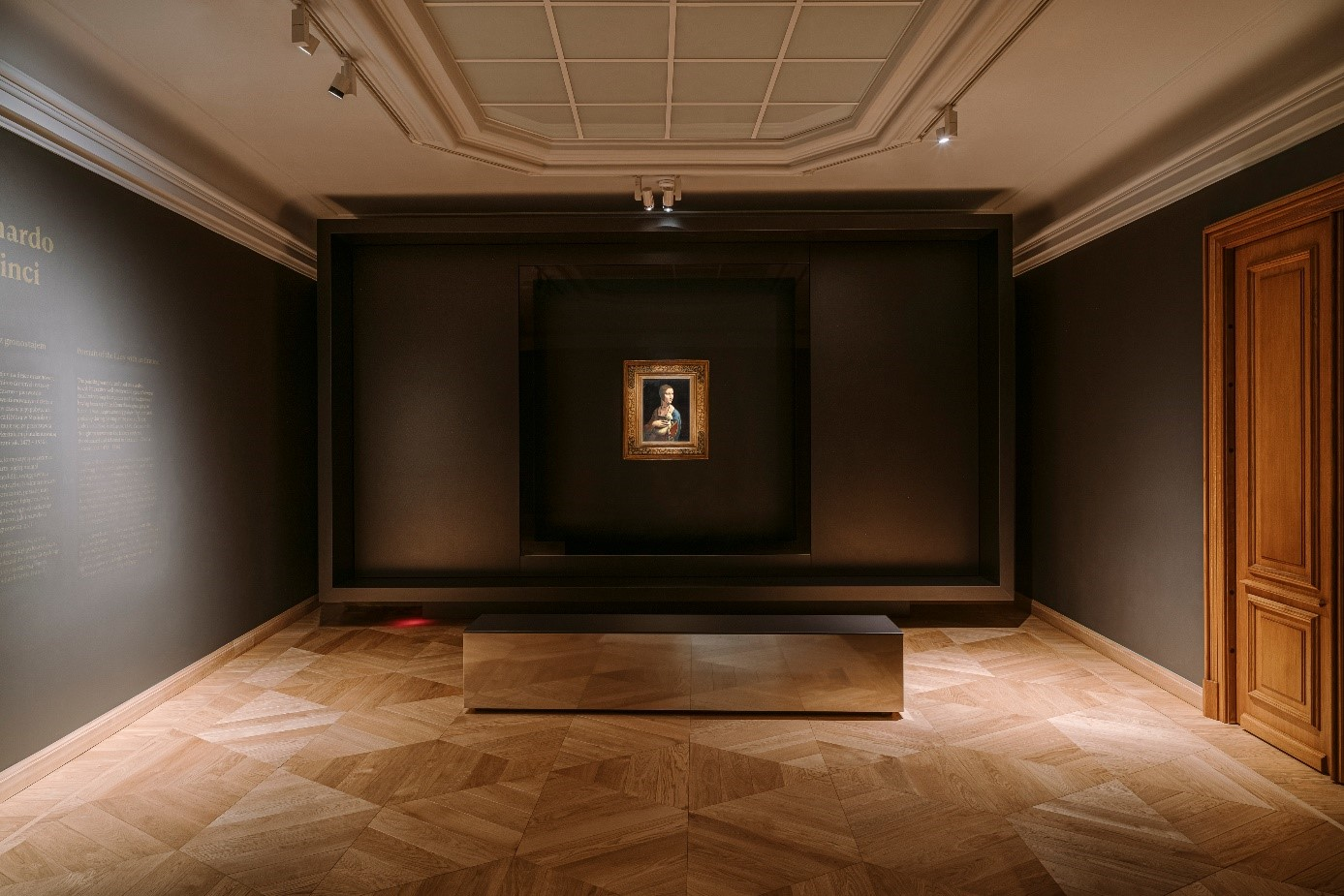
Leonardo's Lady with an Ermine on view at the Czartoryski Museum in Kraków, Poland

After the Cold War, the Czartoryski family made a constant effort to locate the painting. In a 2007 interview, Prince Adam Czartoryski stated that he had tried to recover many of the paintings that were lost during World War II. The painting had been placed in a three-piece collection of the Czartoryski family alongside Rembrandt's Landscape with the Good Samaritan and Leonardo's Lady with an Ermine. Unlike Portrait of a Young Man, the latter two paintings were found in 1945 and returned. However, it is believed that the portrait is not lost but stolen.

The painting's location is unknown, although the Polish Ministry of Foreign Affairs states that it has been known "for years" the painting survived the war. However, in mid-2012 a false report about the painting's rediscovery appeared in popular media, attributed to an alleged statement made by a representative of the Polish Foreign Minister for the restitution of cultural property. It was reported to be hidden in a bank vault of an unidentified location. The Polish newsflash was a hoax intended to drum up readership. Soon afterward, the ministry spokesman explained in a public announcement that there were no new leads in regard to the whereabouts of the artwork; affirming their confidence in its express return to Poland once it is indeed found.

In 2016, the royal pieces moved from the Czartoryski Museum after being bought by the Polish state. The original empty frame of the painting currently hangs in the National Museum of Krakow where the royal collection of works holds openings.

== Popular culture ==
The portrait appeared on The Simpsons episode "Raging Abe Simpson and His Grumbling Grandson in 'The Curse of the Flying Hellfish'" which shows it as one of the paintings that Montgomery Burns and Abraham Simpson steal. Once it is recovered it is turned over to the heir of its rightful owner by the US State Department.

In the 2014 film The Monuments Men, the painting is shown being destroyed by the Germans. It is shown as a prominent painting in a large cache of stolen art stored in an unidentified cave or mine that German troops set on fire with flamethrowers. The scene ends with a close-up of the painting as it starts to bubble and is then consumed by the flames. At the end of the film, during a briefing George Clooney's character Frank Stokes is giving to President Harry S. Truman in a darkened screening room, he projects a picture of the painting on the screen and groups it with many other known paintings still to be found.

The National Geographic Channel TV series Hunting Nazi Treasure explores the potential suspects of the theft of artwork in the episode "Missing masterpiece".

In the first episode of National Treasure: Edge of History, the series' antagonist finds the painting in a hidden cache in Madrid, Spain.

The novel The Mask of Troy has the painting in a Nazi stash in West Germany in early 1945. It is found by the Monuments Men.

In March 2022, the Monuments Men and Women Foundation launched its WWII Most Wanted Art deck of playing cards to raise funds and awareness for artworks looted or displaced during World War II. Raphael’s missing painting is featured prominently on the box art and is also depicted on the Ace of Spades card, which provides a summary of its wartime disappearance and a tip line for submitting leads toward its recovery.

== See also ==
- Art theft and looting during World War II
- Nazi plunder
- Looted art
