= Witold Czartoryski =

Polish nobleman (1824–1865)

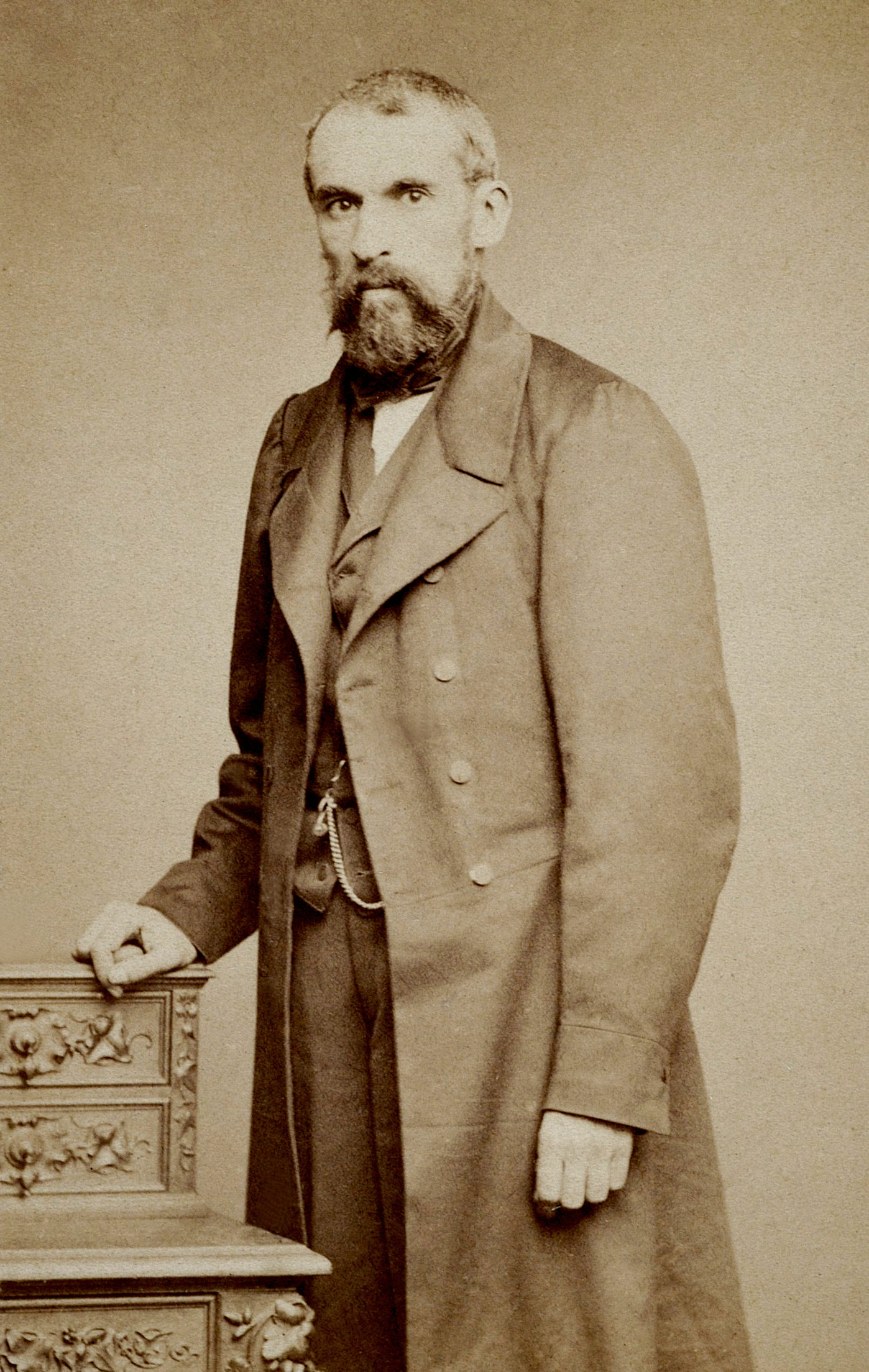
- Coat of arms: Czartoryski
- Born: 6 June 1824; Puławy, Poland
- Died: 14 November 1865 (aged 41); Algiers, Algeria
- Noble family: Czartoryski
- Spouse: Maria Grocholska
- Father: Adam Jerzy Czartoryski
- Mother: Anna Zofia Sapieha

Prince Witold Adam Czartoryski (6 June 1824 – 14 November 1865) was a Polish nobleman (szlachcic), Duke of Klewán and Zuków.

Witold married Maria Grocholska on October 30, 1851 in Paris.
