= Józef Sapieha =

Lithuanian nobleman

Juozapas Sapiega
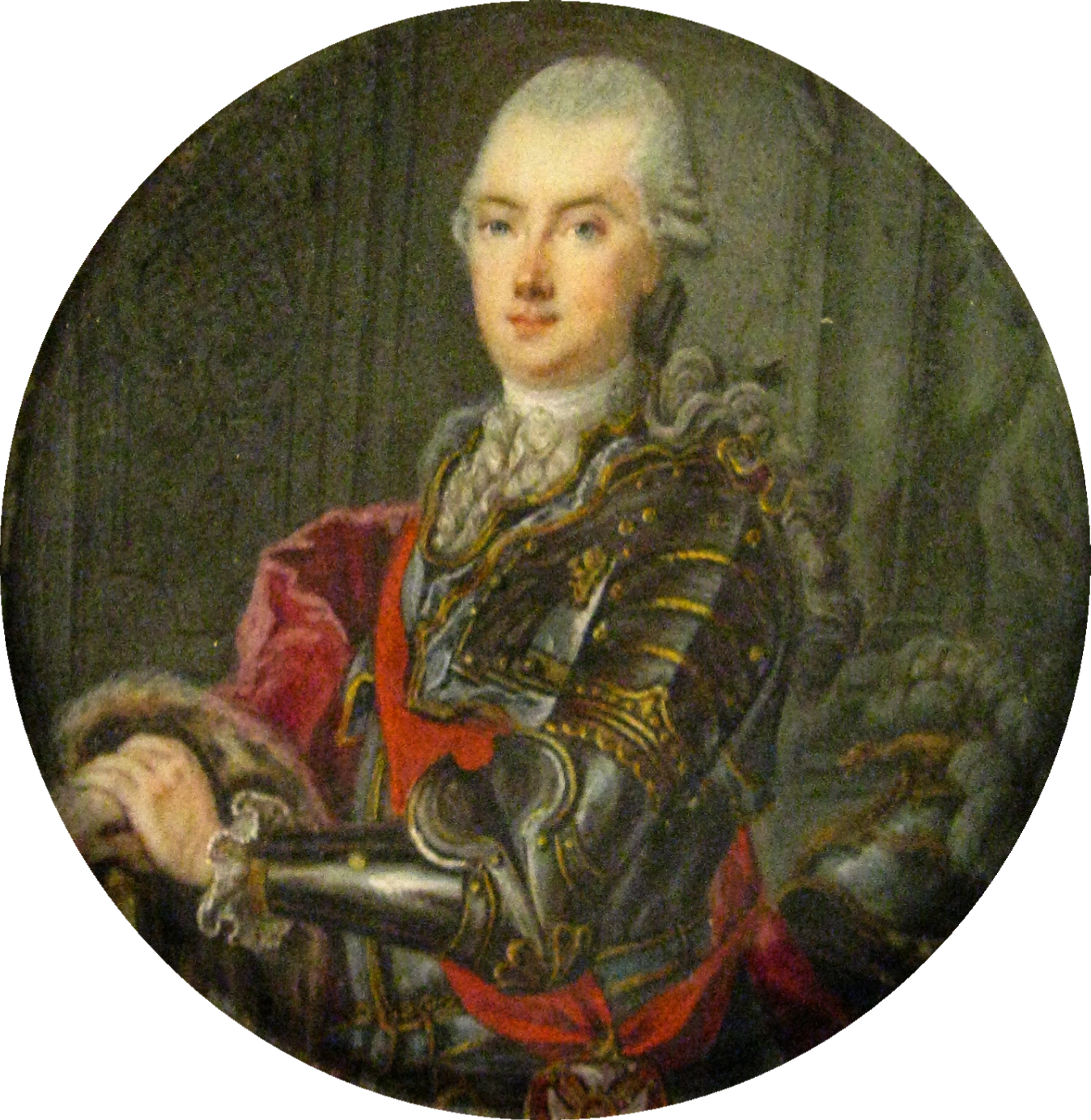
- Coat of arms: Lis
- Born: June 1737
- Died: 10 January 1792 (aged 54); Lachowce
- Noble family: Sapiega
- consort: Teofila Strzeżysława z Jabłonowskich Sapieha
- Issue: Józef; Aleksander Antoni
- Father: Ignacy Sapieha
- Mother: Anna z Krasickich

Juozapas Sapiega (1737-1792) was a Lithuanian nobleman, Great Krajczy of Lithuania, Regimentarz of the Bar Confederation of Lithuania, Marshal of the powiat Wołkowysk during the Bar Confederation.

== Children ==
- Aleksandras Antonijus Sapiega (1773-1812), miecznik of the Duchy of Warsaw, husband of Anna Jadwiga z Zamoyskich Sapieżyna
