= 1993 World Sambo Championships =

Sambo competitions

The 1993 World Sambo Championships were held in Kstovo, Russia on 1993. Championships were organized by FIAS.

== Medals ==
1	Russia	7	2	0	9
2	Belarus	1	2	3	6
3	Mongolia	1	2	2	5
4	Armenia	1	0	1	2
5	Tajikistan	0	1	1	2
5	Moldova	0	1	1	2
