= Princess Cecylia Lubomirska =

- Princess Cecylia of Bourbon-Two Sicilies
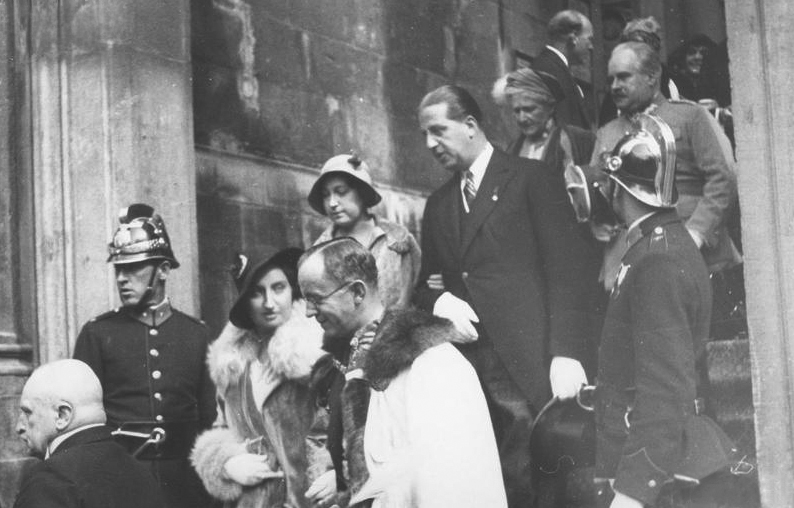
- Born: 28 June 1907; Poręba Wielka, Kingdom of Poland
- Died: 20 September 2001 (aged 94); São Paulo, Brazil
- Spouse: Prince Gabriel of Bourbon-Two Sicilies (m. 1932; died 1975)
- Issue: Prince Jean; Princess Maria Margarita; Princess Marie Immaculata; Prince Casimir
- House: House of Lubomirski (by birth); House of Bourbon-Two Sicilies (by marriage)
- Father: Prince Kazimierz Lubomirski
- Mother: Countess Teresa Maria Matylda Wodzicka z Granowa

Princess Cecylia Lubomirska (28 June 1907 – 20 September 2001) was a member of the House of Lubomirski by birth and a Princess of Bourbon-Two Sicilies through her marriage to Prince Gabriel of Bourbon-Two Sicilies.

== Family ==
Cecylia was the second child and only daughter of Prince Kazimierz Lubomirski and his wife Countess Teresa Maria Matylda Wodzicka z Granowa. Through her father, Cecylia was a great-granddaughter of Count Andrzej Artur Zamoyski and a great-great-granddaughter of Count Stanisław Kostka Zamoyski.

== Marriage and issue ==
Cecylia married Prince Gabriel of Bourbon-Two Sicilies, twelfth child and youngest son of Prince Alfonso of Bourbon-Two Sicilies, Count of Caserta and his wife Princess Antonietta of Bourbon-Two Sicilies, on 15 September 1932 in Kraków. Cecylia and Gabriel had four children:

- Prince Jean Maria Casimir of Bourbon-Two Sicilies (born 30 June 1933 in Warsaw – died 25 December 2000 in Madrid)
- Princess Maria Margarita Therese Antoinette Alfonsine Casimira of Bourbon-Two Sicilies (born 16 November 1934 in Warsaw – died 15 January 2014 in Madrid)

∞ Luis Gonzaga Maldonado y Gordon (born 17 November 1932 in Madrid) on 11 June 1962 in Jerez de la Frontera

- Princess Marie Immaculata of Bourbon-Two Sicilies (born 25 June 1937 in Warsaw – died 14 May 2020 in Mallorca)

∞ Miguel Garcia de Saéz y Tellecea (6 September 1921 – 12 March 1982) on 29 June 1970 in Sant Josep de sa Talaia; divorced in 1979

- Prince Casimir of Bourbon-Two Sicilies (born 8 November 1938 in Warsaw)

∞ Princess Maria Cristina of Savoy-Aosta (born 12 September 1933 in Miramare - 18 November 2023 in Sao Paulo) on 29 January 1967 in Jacarezinho

- Prince Luís Alfonso of Bourbon-Two Sicilies (born 28 November 1970 in Rio de Janeiro)

∞ Christine Apovian (born 20 May 1969) on 22 October 1998 in São Paulo

- Princess Anna Sophia of Bourbon-Two Sicilies (born 9 April 1999 in São Paulo)

- Princess Anna Cecilia of Bourbon-Two Sicilies (born 24 December 1971 in São Paulo)

∞ Count Rodolphe de Causans (born 22 January 1973) civilly on 18 August 2005 in Les Verchers-sur-Layon, religiously on 19 September 2005 in Turin

- Amedeo de Causans (born 8 May 2006)
- Victoria de Causans (born 13 May 2009)

- Princess Elena Sofia of Bourbon-Two Sicilies (born 10 September 1973 in São Paulo)
- Prince Alexander Henrique of Bourbon-Two Sicilies (born 9 August 1974 in São Paulo)

Ordained a priest in Rome on 22 December 2007

== Ancestry ==
Ancestors of Princess Cecylia Lubomirska

8. Prince Henryk Lubomirski
4. Prince Jerzy Lubomirski
9. Princess Teresa Czartoryska
2. Prince Kasimierz Lubomirski
10. Count Andrzej Artur Zamoyski
5. Countess Cecylia Zamoyska
11. Countess Róża Potocka
1. Princess Cecylia Lubomirska
12. Count Henryk Wodzicki
6. Count Józef Wodzicki
13. Princess Teresa Sułkowska
3. Countess Maria Theresia of Granow-Wodzicka
14. Aimé Le Coat de Kerveguen
7. Mathilde Le Coat de Kerveguen
15. Mathilde Louise Seguin
