= Fernando Compte =

Spanish wrestling enthusiast

- Born: December 26, 1930
- Died: 8 September 2013 (aged 82); Madrid, Spain
- Occupation: Sports federation leader

Fernando Compte (26 December 1930 – 8 September 2013) was a Spanish wrestling enthusiast who became president of the Spanish Wrestling Association and secretary general of the International Amateur Wrestling Federation (FILA). In 1984 he was the founder and first president of the Fédération Internationale de Sambo (International Sambo Federation).

== Career ==
Compte was born in 1930 in Barcelona, but lived in Madrid for many years apart from a period in Venezuela. Compte became president of the Spanish Wrestling Federation in 1970. On 21 July 1977 he was reelected president of the Spanish Wrestling Federation in competition with Daniel Ochoa. He married Eva Balle in 1978, and they had three children.

Fernando Compte became Secretary General of the International Amateur Wrestling Federation (FILA), where he became interested in Sambo wrestling. In 1974 he was made President of the FILA Commission for Sambo affairs, and in 1976 became President of the Worldwide Sambo Committee. In 1976 the Chinese government gave sports medals to Prince Adan Czartoryski Bourbon and Fernando Compte. In 1977 the first Sambo World Cup was held in Oviedo, Spain.

At the suggestion of Milan Ercegan, President of the FILA, the Worldwide Sambo Committee declared independence from the FILA at the 1984 congress in Jönköping, Sweden. At this time Fernando Compte resigned from his position as Secretary General of the FILA, and became an honorary member of FILA. Compte was elected first president of the Fédération Internationale de Sambo (FIAS). He was head of the FIAS for seven years. In 1985 the FIAS became the member of the General Association of International Sports Federations (GAFIS).

In 1990 Compte was living in Venezuela, and was pressing for recognition of Sambo as an Olympic sport. Fernando Compte died on 8 September 2013 in Madrid, aged 89.

== Publications ==
- Compte, Fernando (1968), Lucha libre olímpica, Madrid

== Sources ==
- "Events from day to day", Taiwan Today, 1 April 1976
- "Fernando, Compte, otro presidente que continúa", El País, 22 July 1977
- Foley, Tim (10 September 2013), Death of Fernando Compte, United World Wrestling
- Grishin, Sergei (8 September 2013), Fernando Compte Passed Away, Fédération Internationale de Sambo (FIAS)
- In memory of Fernando Compte. Founder of the International SAMBO Federation, Фонд поддержки и развития самбо, 16 November 2013
- "Sambo History", Inside the Games, Dunsar Media Company Limited
- Sport USSR (1990), Sport USSR and World Arena, Soviet Union magazine
