= Madeleine Radziwiłł =

Polish-Belarusian aristocrat

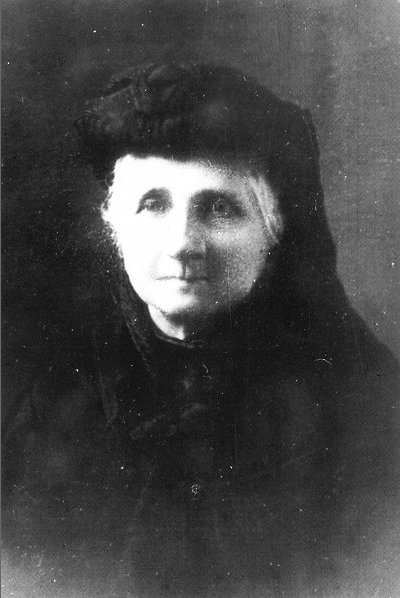
- Born: 1861
- Died: 1945
- Spouse(s): Ludwik Józef Krasiński
- Issue: Maria Ludwika
- Father: Jan Kazimierz Zawisza-Kierżgajło
- Mother: Marie Kwilecka

Princess Maria Madeleine Radziwiłł (born Marie-Eve-Madeleine-Josephus-Elizabeth-Apollonia-Catherine Zawisza-Kierżgajło; 1861 Warsaw – 1945 Fribourg) was a Polish–Belarusian aristocrat who financed many Catholic works and Belarusian national renaissance.

== Biography ==
She was the daughter of Count Jan Kazimierz Zawisza-Kierżgajło and the Countess Marie Kwilecka, former lady-in-waiting to the Russian Empress and great-granddaughter of King Stanisław August Poniatowski. The count was keen on archaeology and collected ancient medals and coins. They spoke French and Polish at home, as well as Belarusian with servants. She was educated by governesses and teachers. She spent her winters in Warsaw. Her older sister Maria Ewa married Michał Piotr Radziwiłł of the Nieborów branch and also became a philanthropist.

In 1882, Madeleine married the wealthy Count Ludwik Józef Krasiński (1833–1885) who was 27 years her senior. They had a daughter, Maria Ludwika (1883–1958), who married Prince Adam Czartoryski in 1901. As a widow, Countess Krasinska spent most of her time at her property near Igumen (now Chervyen in Minsk Province) and also visited the properties inherited from her father.

In 1904, she fell in love with the young prince Wacław Mikołaj Radziwiłł (1880–1914) who was 19 years younger than her (she was 45, he was 26). They married in London on March 30, 1906. The scandal isolated them. The prince was dismissed from society, their London relations turned away from them. They left to settle in Kuchcičy, owned by the princess. He was dedicated to the management of the property which included an immense forest of pines and oaks of 27,000 dessiatines (73,000 acres).

Prince Radziwiłł fought in the Russian Imperial Army during the First World War and died at the beginning of the war in East Prussia. She devoted herself to works of charity and becomes a Dominican tertiary. She was at the head of a large fortune with 18 estates and immense forests. She lived in Kaunas, then in Germany. Finally she was ruined and in 1932, finished her days in Fribourg, in a convent of Dominicans. Her ashes were reburied in Minsk.

== Philanthropy ==
She financed a Belarusian newspaper, Biełarus, the publishing house Zahlanie sonce i ŭ naše vakonce, a society to fight against alcoholism, a school of the village of Kuchcičy. She received representatives of Belarusian culture such as Vaclav Iwanowski (Vatslav Ivanovski), a Minister of Education in 1918 of the Belarusian People's Republic (shot in 1943 by the NKGB); the Lutskevich brothers publishers of the Belarusian weekly Nasha Niva (1906–1915); Roman Skirmunt, member of the Third Duma (1910–1911) and Chairman of the Belarusian People's Committee (1915–1917); or Edward Woyniłłowicz a politician. She materially aided Maksim Bahdanovič in publishing his first books, as well as Maksim Haretski, Jakub Kolas and Anton Levitsky. She helped finance Vilnius University.

Radziwiłł also helped charitable works like the convent of Druya with their high school which was opened by the Marianists of the Immaculate Conception in 1923; had a seminary built in Vilnius and donated to the construction of the St Casimir's Lithuanian Church in London. She is active at the Minsk Charity Society helping victims of the war. After the war, she financed the seminary for the Belarusian Greek Catholic Church in Rome and members of the "Lithuanian Renaissance". She donated funds to build a church in Warsaw, and orphanages and children's homes in Minsk. She donated 1,009 books to the Lithuanian Scientific Society. In 1930, she was awarded the Order of the Lithuanian Grand Duke Gediminas (1st degree).

== See also ==
- Radziwiłł family
