= Kazimierz Lubomirski =

Polish politician (1869–1930)

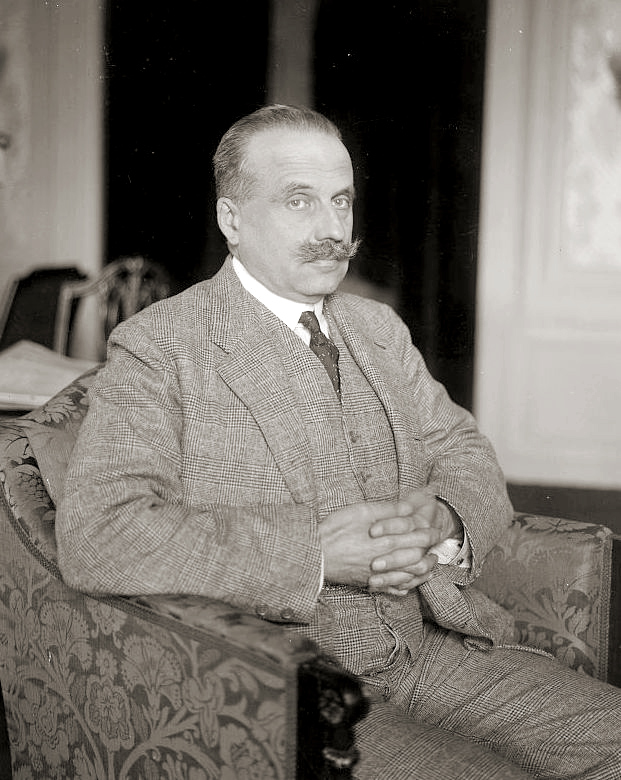
- Lubomirski in 1919.

Envoy of Poland to the United States
- In office 1 September 1919 – 31 October 1922
- Preceded by: Office established
- Succeeded by: Władysław Wróblewski

Member of the Diet of Galicia and Lodomeria
- In office 1901–1913
- Constituency: Myślenice

Personal details
- Born: 16 July 1869 Przeworsk, Kingdom of Galicia and Lodomeria (now part of Poland)
- Died: 15 December 1930 Kraków, Poland
- Resting place: Basilica of the Holy Trinity, Kraków, Poland
- Party: National Right-Wing Party
- Spouse: Teresa Maria Wodzicka
- Children: Henryk Lubomirski; Cecylia Lubomirska; Sebastian Lubomirski; Andrzej Lubomirski
- Parents: Jerzy Henryk Lubomirski; Cecylia Zamoyska
- Education: Jagiellonian University

Prince Kazimierz Lubomirski (Polish: [kaˈʑi.mjɛʂ lu.bɔˈmir.ski]; 16 July 1869 – 15 December 1930) was a Polish diplomat, nobleman, politician, and sports activist. He was the first envoy of Poland to the United States, serving from 1919 to 1922. He was also a chairperson of the Polish Olympic Committee from 1921 to 1929, and a member of the International Olympic Committee in 1923. Additionally, from 1903 to 1913, he was a member of the Diet of Galicia and Lodomeria for Myślenice electoral district. He came from the Lubomirski noble family.

== Biography ==
Kazimierz Lubomirski was born on 16 July 1869 in Przeworsk, Kingdom of Galicia and Lodomeria (now part of Poland). He was the son of Jerzy Henryk Lubomirski (1817–1872), and Cecylia Zamoyska (1831–1904), and a brother of Teresa Celestyna Radziwiłł (1856–1883), Elżbieta Lubomirska (1858–1859), Maria Tyszkiewicz (1860–1942), and Andrzej Lubomirski (1862–1953). He came from Lubomirski noble family, which was part of the Drużyna heraldic clan.

In 1888, Lubomirski graduated from the Jan III Sobieski High School in Kraków, and began studying law at the Jagiellonian University in Kraków. From 1901 to 1913, he was a member of the Diet of Galicia and Lodomeria, representing the Myślenice electoral district. During this time, he was a member of committees of education, railway, and agrarian reform. From 1913, Lubomirski was a member of the National Right-Wing Party. In 1918, during the Polish–Ukrainian War, together with his brother, Andrzej Lubomirski, they rallied for aid to Polish forces in the Battle of Lemberg, and for the return of the Blue Army to Poland.

On 1 September 1919, Lubomirski became the envoy of Poland to the United States, arriving at the embassy of Poland in the Washington, D.C. on 15 May 1920. As the envoy, he negotiated with the United States, in matters of it granting a loan to Poland, and served until 31 October 1922. Following that, he retired from diplomacy and devoted himself to working with Polish landed gentry organizations. From 1924 to 1930, with a break in 1926, he was a chairperson of the Supreme Council of the Landed Gentry Organizations. From 1921 to 1929, he was also a chairperson of the Polish Olympic Committee, and a member of the International Olympic Committee in 1923.

Lubomirski died on 15 December 1930 in Kraków, Poland, and was buried in the Basilica of the Holy Trinity in said city.

== Private life ==
In 1902, Lubomirski married Teresa Maria Wodzicka (1883–1948). Together, they had four children: Henryk Lubomirski (1905–1986), Cecylia Lubomirska (1907–2001), Sebastian Lubomirski, (1908–?), and Andrzej Lubomirski (1911–2003). In 1922, he owned a landed property with a total area of 13,020 ha.

== Orders and decorations ==
- Commander's Cross of the Order of Polonia Restituta (8 November 1930)
- Legion of Honour
- Order of Agricultural Merit

== See also ==
- list of ambassadors of Poland to the United States
