= Princess María de los Dolores of Bourbon-Two Sicilies =

Princess Dolores
- Princess Maria de los Dolores Czartoryska
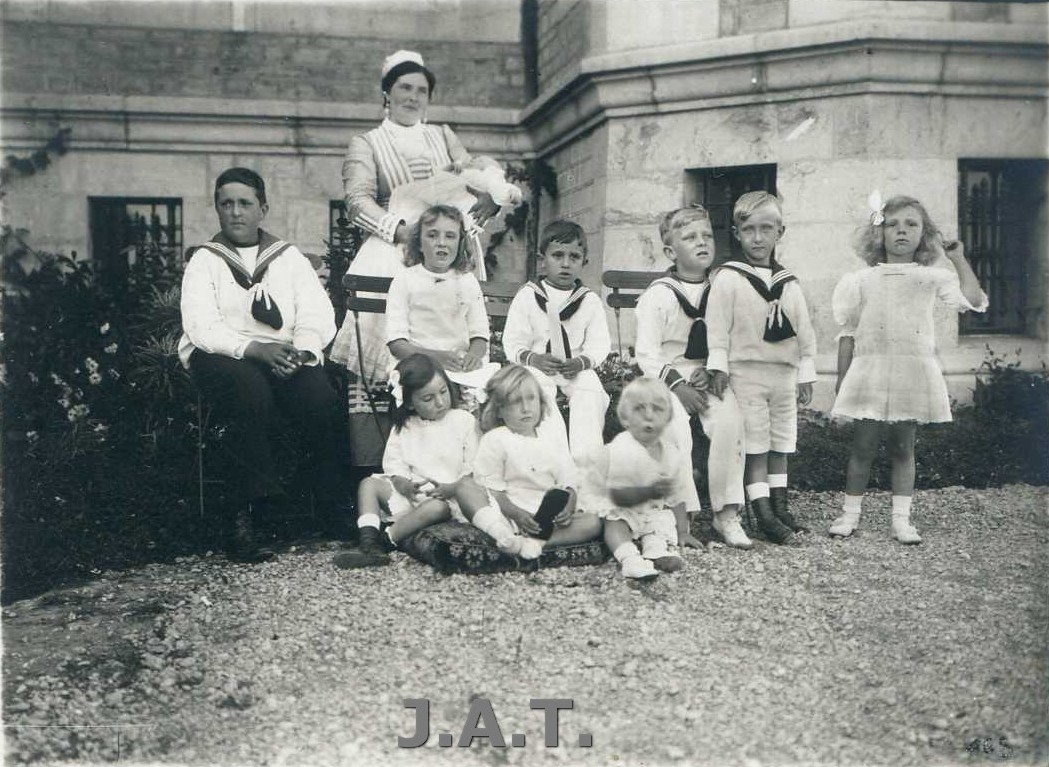
- Dolores with her family in 1914
- Born: 15 November 1909; Madrid, Spain
- Died: 11 May 1996 (aged 86); Madrid, Spain
- Burial: Church of the Divine Savior, Seville
- Spouse: Prince Augustyn Józef Czartoryski (m. 1937; died 1946) Carlos Chias Osorio (m. 1950)
- Issue: Prince Adam Karol Czartoryski; Prince Ludwik Piotr Czartoryski
Names
- Spanish: María de los Dolores Victoria Felipa María de las Mercedes Luisa Carlota Eugenia y Todos los Santos
- House: Bourbon-Two Sicilies
- Father: Prince Carlos of Bourbon-Two Sicilies
- Mother: Princess Louise of Orléans

Princess Dolores of Bourbon-Two Sicilies (15 November 1909 – 11 May 1996) was a daughter of Prince Carlos of Bourbon-Two Sicilies and his wife Princess Louise of Orléans. Princess Dolores was born into the House of Bourbon-Two Sicilies and was a member of the Polish-Lithuanian noble Czartoryski family through her marriage to Prince Augustyn Józef Czartoryski. She was also an aunt of Juan Carlos I of Spain, son of her sister Princess María de las Mercedes of Bourbon-Two Sicilies.

== Early life ==
Born on 15 November 1909 at the Palace of Villamejor, Princess Dolores of Bourbon-Two Sicilies was the second child of Prince Carlos of Bourbon-Two Sicilies and his second wife Princess Louise of Orléans. She was christened Maria de los Dolores Victoria Felipa Luisa Mercedes. Princess Dolores, nicknamed Dola among his relatives, was closely related to the Spanish royal family. Her father, Prince Carlos of Bourbon-Two Sicilies, had renounced his right to the throne of Two Sicilies becoming a Spanish citizen when he married his first wife, Mercedes, Princess of Asturias, the eldest sister of King Alfonso XIII of Spain. Dolores’s mother, Princess Louise of Orléans was a first cousin once removed of the Spanish King. As a result, Dolores and her sibling grew up in close proximity to the Spanish royal family. Her cousins, the children of King Alfonso XIII and Queen Victoria Eugenie were the same age as Dolores and her younger siblings. The family lived at the Palace of Villamejor in Madrid, vacations were spent near Seville in the Palace of Villamanrique, property of her maternal grandmother, Isabelle, Countess of Paris.

Princess Dolores studied with her sisters Mercedes and Esperanza in a school of Irish nuns in Madrid. Her drawing teacher was the famous painter Manuel González Santos. Dolores was twelve years old when she moved with her family to Seville when her father was appointed Military Captain General of Andalusia. The Princess and her sisters continued their studies as boarders at the school of Irish nuns in Castilleja de la Cueva in Seville. Vacations were usually spent in France with their maternal relatives. The family was very popular in Seville where they lived until April 1931 when the Second Spanish Republic forced them to exile. They moved to Cannes and later to Paris.

== Marriage and later life ==
In Paris, Princess Dolores met a wealthy Polish aristocrat Prince Augustyn Józef Czartoryski, 13th Prince Czartoryski, Duke of Klewan and Zuków, son of Prince Adam Ludwik Czartoryski and his wife Countess Maria Ludwika Krasińska. They were married on 12 August 1937 in Ouchy, Switzerland. The couple settled in Kraków, Poland where Dolores’s husband took over the running of the Family Museum. Their lives were disrupted with the Second World War. In September 1939 with the Invasion of Poland bombs fell on Kraków, Prince Augustyn and Princess Dolores, who was pregnant, decided to leave the country and move to Spain. In their escape, they were picked up by the Gestapo and put under arrest. It was through the intervention of the Spanish ambassador in Berlin that they were released.

After reaching Paris, Princess Dolores and her husband moved permanently to Spain. They settled in Seville where Princess Dolores gave birth to a son: Prince Adam Karol Czartoryski (born 2 January 1940). Her husband, meanwhile was very active in the Polish resistance. In 1943 the couple bought a rural property in Dos Hermanas which they called it Garden of the Princess, the farm was self-sufficient for the subsistence of the family. The couple had a second son also born in Seville, Prince Ludwik Piotr Czartoryski (13 March 1945 - 3 May 1946), but the child died at only fourteen months.

At the end of the war, the properties of the Czartoryski family were nationalized by the Polish government and the family decided not to return to Kraków, for fear of the Soviet occupation. Prince Augustyn was in poor health, the troubles and tribulation of the war took a toll on his life and he died on 1 July 1946, aged thirty nine. The deaths of both her youngest son and her husband only two months apart in 1946 deeply affected the Princess, who was left a widow with a six-year-old child.

Princess Dolores continued living in Seville, Spain. Four years into her widowhood, she fell in love with Carlos Chías Osorio (born at Barcelona 26 Feb 1925), an ex seminarist, teacher and preceptor of her son Adam. He was fifteen years her junior. They married on 29 December 1950 in Seville. Their union produced no children. Carlos Chias Osorio quickly became well liked in Dos Hermanas and in spite of the age disparity the marriage was a happy one. The couple lived in Seville until 1958. After the death of Princess Dolores's mother in April that year, the couple moved to Madrid. In the following decades, the princess and her husband lived simply in Madrid. She died in Madrid on 11 May 1996 and was buried in Seville.

== Ancestry ==
Ancestors of Princess María de los Dolores of Bourbon-Two Sicilies

8. Ferdinand II of the Two Sicilies
4. Prince Alfonso, Count of Caserta
9. Archduchess Maria Theresa of Austria
2. Prince Carlos of Bourbon-Two Sicilies
10. Prince Francis, Count of Trapani
5. Princess Maria Antonietta of Bourbon-Two Sicilies
11. Archduchess Maria Isabella of Austria
1. Princess María de los Dolores of Bourbon-Two Sicilies
12. Prince Ferdinand Philippe, Duke of Orléans
6. Prince Philippe, Count of Paris
13. Duchess Helene of Mecklenburg-Schwerin
3. Princess Louise of Orléans
14. Prince Antoine, Duke of Montpensier
7. Princess Marie Isabelle of Orléans
15. Infanta Luisa Fernanda of Spain
