= Princess Maria Antonietta of Bourbon-Two Sicilies =

Princess Maria Antonietta
- Countess of Caserta
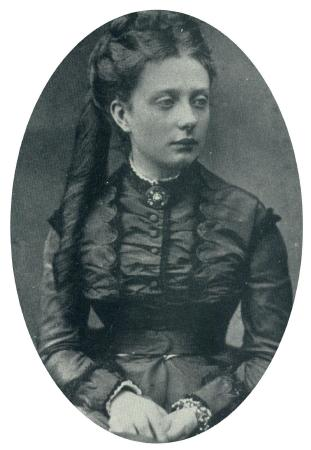
- Princess Maria Antonietta, c. 1870
- Born: 16 March 1851; Naples, Kingdom of the Two Sicilies
- Died: 12 September 1938 (aged 87); Freiburg im Breisgau, Republic of Baden, Nazi Germany
- Burial: Cimetière du Grand Jas, Cannes
- Spouse: Prince Alfonso, Count of Caserta (m. 1868; died 1934)
- Issue: Prince Ferdinando Pio, Duke of Castro; Prince Carlos; Prince Francesco di Paola; Princess Maria Immaculata; Princess Maria Cristina; Princess Maria di Grazia; Prince Ranieri, Duke of Castro; Prince Filippo; Prince Francesco d'Assisi; Prince Gabriele
Names
- Italian: Maria Antonia Giuseppe Leopoldina Sebazia Ciriaca Francesca di Paola Elisabetta
- House: Bourbon-Two Sicilies
- Father: Prince Francis, Count of Trapani
- Mother: Archduchess Maria Isabella of Austria

Coat of arms

Princess Maria Antonietta of Bourbon-Two Sicilies (Maria Antonietta Giuseppina Leopoldina; 16 March 1851 – 12 September 1938) was a Princess of Bourbon-Two Sicilies by birth and by her marriage to Prince Alfonso, Count of Caserta, claimant to the defunct throne of the Two Sicilies.

== Family ==
Maria Antonietta was the eldest daughter of Prince Francis, Count of Trapani (son of Francis I of the Two Sicilies) and his wife (and niece) Archduchess Maria Isabella of Austria, Princess of Tuscany. She was an elder sister of Maria Carolina, Countess Andrzej Zamoyski.

== Marriage and issue ==
Maria Antonietta married her first cousin Prince Alfonso, Count of Caserta, son of Ferdinand II of the Two Sicilies and his wife Maria Theresa of Austria, on 8 June 1868 in Rome. Antonietta and Alfonso had twelve children:

- Prince Ferdinand Pius of Bourbon-Two Sicilies, Duke of Calabria (25 July 1869 – 17 January 1960)

∞ Princess Maria Ludwiga Theresia of Bavaria, daughter of Ludwig III of Bavaria. This marriage produced six children.

- Prince Carlos of Bourbon-Two Sicilies (10 November 1870 – 11 November 1949)

∞ Mercedes, Princess of Asturias, daughter of Alfonso XII of Spain. This marriage produced three children.
∞ Princess Louise of Orléans, daughter of Prince Philippe, Count of Paris. This marriage produced four children.

- Prince Francesco di Paola of the Two Sicilies (14 July 1873 – 26 June 1876)
- Princess Maria Immaculata of Bourbon-Two Sicilies (30 October 1874 – 28 November 1947)

∞ Prince Johann Georg of Saxony, son of George of Saxony. This marriage produced no issue.

- Princess Maria Cristina of Bourbon-Two Sicilies (10 April 1877 – 4 October 1947)

∞ Archduke Peter Ferdinand of Austria, Prince of Tuscany, son of Ferdinand IV, Grand Duke of Tuscany. This marriage produced four children.

- Princess Maria di Grazia of Bourbon-Two Sicilies (12 August 1878 – 20 June 1973)

∞ Prince Luiz of Orléans-Braganza, son of Prince Gaston, Count of Eu. This marriage produced three children.

- Princess Maria Giuseppina of the Two Sicilies (25 February 1880 – 22 July 1971)
- Prince Gennaro of the Two Sicilies (24 January 1882 – 11 April 1944)

∞ Beatrice Bordessa, created Countess of Villa Colli, born into a bourgeois Italian family from Chester in the North of England. This marriage produced no issue.

- Prince Ranieri of the Two Sicilies, Duke of Castro (1883–1973)

∞ Countess Maria Carolina Zamoyska, daughter of Count Andrzej Przemysław Zamoyski. This marriage produced two children.

- Prince Filippo of the Two Sicilies (10 December 1885 – 9 March 1949)

∞ Princess Marie Louise d'Orléans, daughter of Prince Emmanuel, Duke of Vendôme. This marriage produced one child.
∞ Odette Labori, daughter of the French attorney Fernand Labori. This marriage produced no issue.

- Prince Francesco d'Assisi of the Two Sicilies (13 January 1888 – 26 March 1914)
- Prince Gabriele of the Two Sicilies (1 January 1897 – 22 October 1975)

∞ Princess Malgorzata Izabella Czartoryska, daughter of Prince Adam Ludwik Czartoryski. This marriage produced one child.
∞ Princess Cecylia Lubomirska, daughter of Prince Kasimierz Lubomirski. This marriage produced four children.

== Honours ==
- Spain: 697th Dame of the Order of Queen Maria Luisa - .
- Austria-Hungary: Dame of the Order of the Starry Cross - .

Princess Maria Antonietta of Bourbon-Two Sicilies House of Bourbon-Two Sicilies Cadet branch of the House of Bourbon Born: 16 March 1851 Died: 12 September 1938
Titles in pretence
Preceded by Maria Sophie of Bavaria	— TITULAR — Queen consort of the Two Sicilies; 27 December 1894 – 26 May 1934; Reason for succession failure: Italian Unification under the House of Savoy	Succeeded by Maria Ludwiga Theresia of Bavaria
