= Żukówko, Pomeranian Voivodeship =

Żukówko
- Village
- Location within Poland
- Coordinates: 54°13′40″N 17°38′35″E
- Country: Poland
- Voivodeship: Pomeranian
- County: Bytów
- Gmina: Parchowo
- Elevation: 59 m (194 ft)
- Population: 229

Żukówko [ʐuˈkufkɔ] is a village in Gmina Parchowo, Bytów County, Pomeranian Voivodeship, in northern Poland.

From 1975 to 1998 the village was in Słupsk Voivodeship.
