= Aleksander Antoni Sapieha =

Polish nobleman (1773–1812)

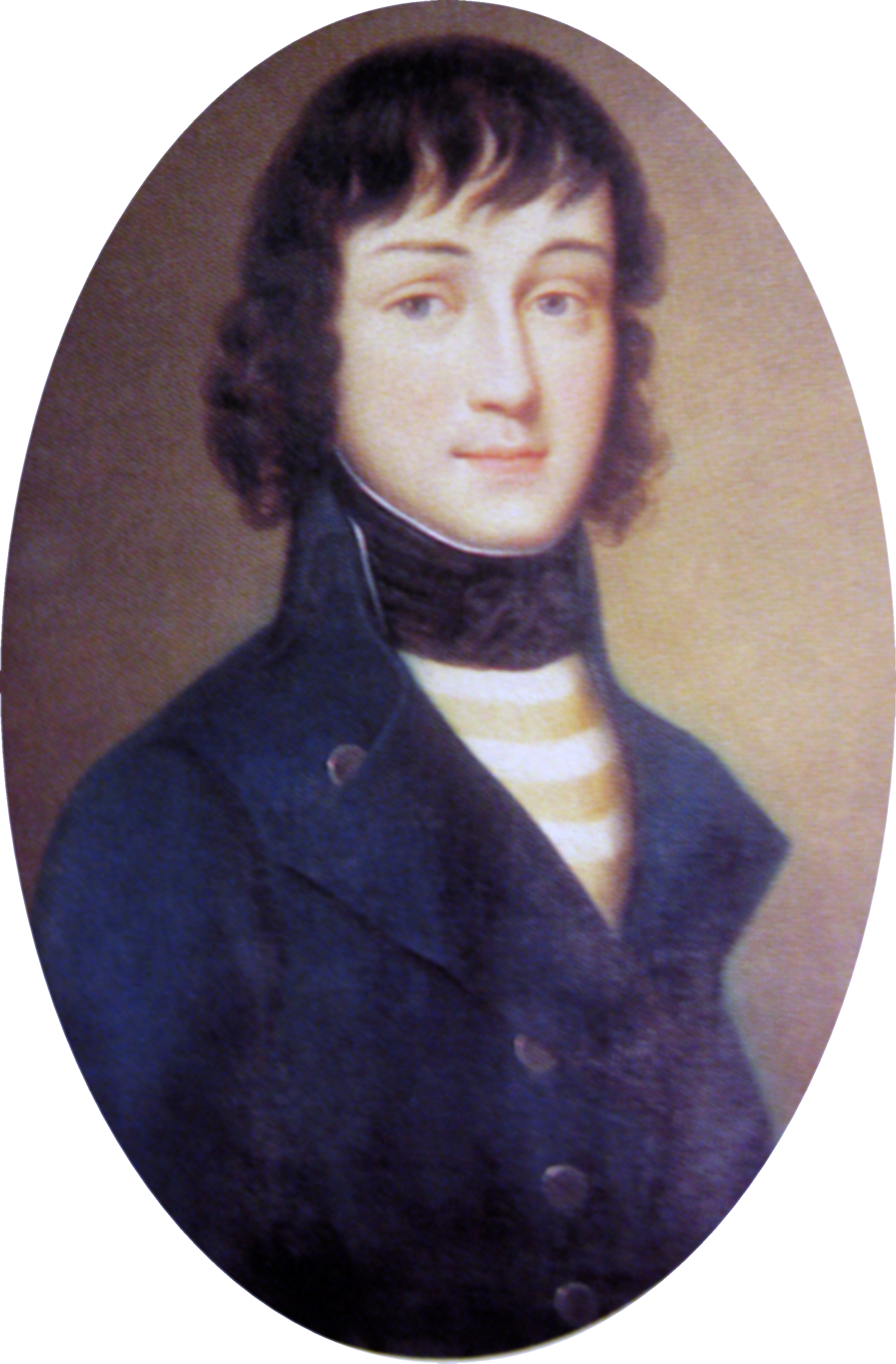
- Coat of arms: Lis
- Born: 3 September 1773; Strasbourg, France
- Died: 8 September 1812 (aged 39); Dereczyn, Poland
- Noble family: Sapieha
- consort: Anna Jadwiga z Zamoyskich Sapieżyna
- Issue: Leon; Anna Zofia
- Father: Józef Sapieha
- Mother: Teofila Strzeżysława z Jabłonowskich Sapieha

Prince Aleksander Antoni Sapieha (September 3, 1773 – September 8, 1812) was a Polish nobleman, miecznik of the Duchy of Warsaw, naturalist, traveler, politician, chamberlain and adjutant of Emperor Napoleon I.

== Children ==
- Anna Zofia Sapieha (1799–1864), wife of Adam Jerzy Czartoryski – "Rondo á la Krakowiak F Dur, op. 14" was dedicated to her by Frédéric Chopin.
- Leon Sapieha (1803–1878), one of the leaders of the November Uprising. Husband of Countess Jadwiga Klementyna Zamoyska.

== Bibliography ==
- J. Skowronek, Z magnackiego gniazda do napoleońskiego wywiadu. Aleksander Sapieha, Warszawa 1992
