= Maria Ludwika Krasińska =

Polish noblewoman, heiress, and art collector (1883–1958)

- Princess Maria Ludwika Czartoryska
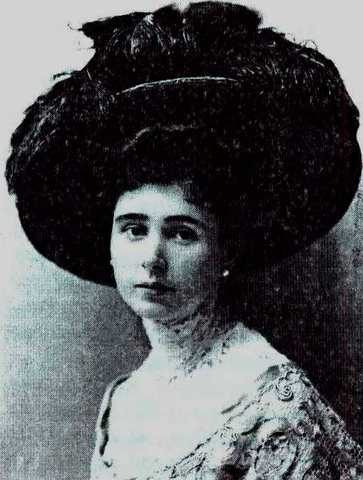
- Coat of arms: Ślepowron
- Full name: Maria Ludwika Joanna Józefa
- Born: Maria Ludwika Joanna Józefa, Countess Krasińska; 24 March 1883; Warsaw, Congress Poland
- Died: 23 January 1958 (aged 74); Cannes, France
- Noble family: Krasiński
- Spouse: Adam Ludwik Czartoryski (m. 1901; died 1937)
- Issue: Princess Malgorzata Izabella Czartoryska; Princess Izabella Czartoryska; Princess Elżbieta Czartoryska; Prince Augustyn Józef Czartoryski; Princess Anna Maria Czartoryska; Prince Władysław Czartoryski; Princess Teresa Czartoryska; Prince Ludwik Czartoryski
- Father: Ludwik Józef Krasiński
- Mother: Magdalena Zawisza-Kierżgaiłło

Countess Maria Ludwika Krasińska (24 March 1883 – 23 January 1958) was a Polish noblewoman, major heiress, landowner, and a significant art collector.

== Biography ==
Maria Ludwika was born on 24 March 1883 in Warsaw, the only child of Count Ludwik Józef Krasiński (1833–1895) and his wife, Countess Magdalena Zawisza-Kierżgaiłło (1861–1935). Following her father's death in 1895, she became the primary heiress to one of the largest aristocratic fortunes in Poland, which included vast agricultural estates, forestry tracts, and ancestral urban properties. Her inherited art collections and private capital served as a structural foundation for the expansion of the Krasinski Museum in Warsaw, securing historical artifacts and European fine art during the early twentieth century.

== Marriage and issue ==
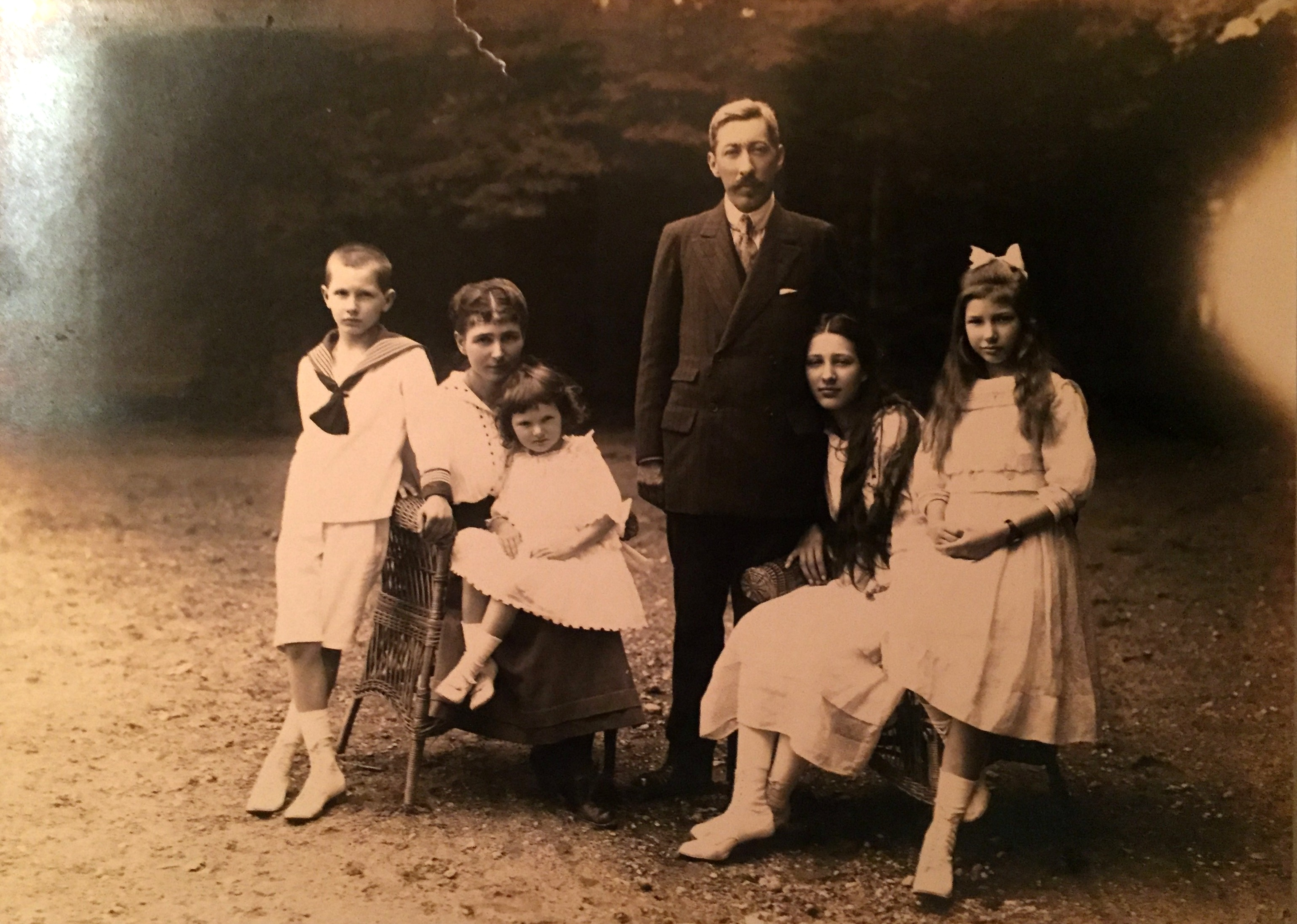
Princess Maria Czartoryska with her husband and children, 1917.

On 31 August 1901 in Warsaw, she married Prince Adam Ludwik Czartoryski, the eldest son of Prince Władysław Czartoryski and Princess Marguerite of Orléans. The marriage produced eight children:

- Princess Malgorzata Izabella Czartoryska (1902–1929), married Prince Gabriel of Bourbon-Two Sicilies in 1927 and had issue.
- Princess Izabella Czartoryska (1904–1904).
- Princess Elżbieta Czartoryska (1905–1989), married Count Stefan Adam Zamoyski in 1929 and had issue.
- Prince Augustyn Józef Czartoryski (1907–1946), married Princess María de los Dolores of Bourbon-Two Sicilies in 1937 and had issue.
- Princess Anna Maria Czartoryska (1914–1987), married Prince Władysław Radziwiłł in 1934 and had issue.
- Prince Władysław Czartoryski (1918–1978), married Elizabeth York in 1949 and without issue.
- Princess Teresa Czartoryska (1923–1967), married Jan Groda-Kowalski in 1946 and had issue.
- Prince Ludwik Czartoryski (1927–1944), died during the Warsaw Uprising in World War II.

== Later life and death ==
Following the geopolitical disruptions of World War II and the subsequent nationalization of industrial and noble estates in Poland, Maria Ludwika permanently relocated to France. She dedicated her later years to family obligations and the administration of surviving private archives. She died on 23 January 1958 at the age of 74 in Cannes, France.
