= Stefan Adam Zamoyski =

Polish nobleman (1904–1976)

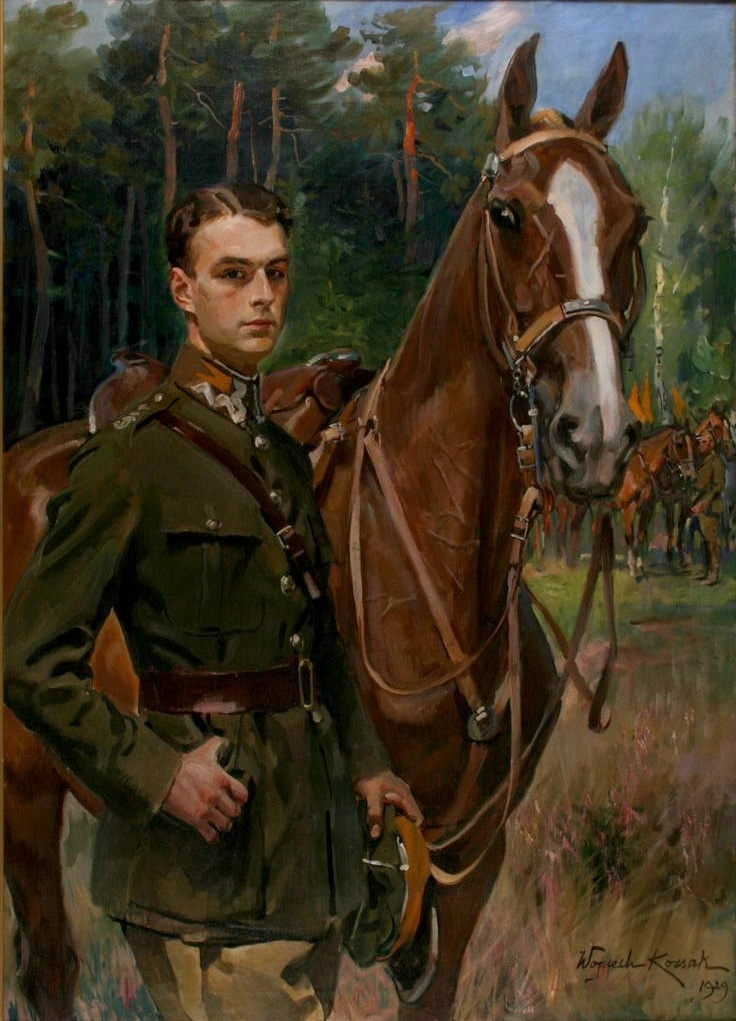
- Equestrian portrait in 1929 by Wojciech Kossak

- Coat of arms: Jelita
- Born: 17 February 1904; Racewo, Russian Empire (now Poland)
- Died: 27 October 1976 (aged 72); San Francisco, United States
- Noble family: Zamoyski
- Spouse: Elżbieta Czartoryska (m. 1929)
- Issue: Maria Helena Zamoyska; Zdzisław Klemens Zamoyski; Adam Zamoyski
- Father: Władysław Zdzisław Zamoyski
- Mother: Maria Mężyńska

Count Stefan Adam Zamoyski (17 February 1904 – 27 October 1976) was a Polish nobleman, landowner and a magnate.

== Biography ==
Born into an old and wealthy Zamoyski family, Stefan Adam was the eldest son of Count Wladyslaw Zamoyski (1873-1944) and his wife, Marie Mezynska (1878-1956). He had a degree of Doctor of Law. He was owner of estates in Wysock. Lt.-Col. Count Stefan Zamoyski served as an aide-de-camp to Polish Prime Minister-in-exile Wladislaw Sikorski in London. In December 1940, Lt.-Col. Zamoyski wrote to the head of RAF Bomber Command, requesting that the German concentration camp Auschwitz be bombed to allow the Polish political prisoners imprisoned there at the time to escape. The RAF declined to act.

Following World War II, Zamoyski remained in Britain. He worked at the Jockey Club where he came into contact with Captain Kazimierz Bobinski. Together, they completed Bobinski's work on compiling the "Bobinski-Zamoyski Family Tables of Racehorses", published in 1954. He later set up a business exporting racehorses internationally.

He was awarded the Virtuti Militari Order.

== Marriage and issue ==
On 26 June 1929 in Gołuchów, he married Princess Elżbieta Czartoryska (1905-1989), second daughter of Prince Adam Ludwik Czartoryski and his wife, Countess Maria Ludwika Krasińska. They had three children:

- Countess Maria Helena Zamoyska (born on 12 February 1940 in Rome)
- Count Zdzisław Klemens Zamoyski (born on 25 September 1943 in Washington, D.C.)
- Count Adam Stefan Zamoyski (born 11 January 1949)
