= Prince Gabriel of Bourbon-Two Sicilies =

Prince of Two Sicilies

Prince Gabriel
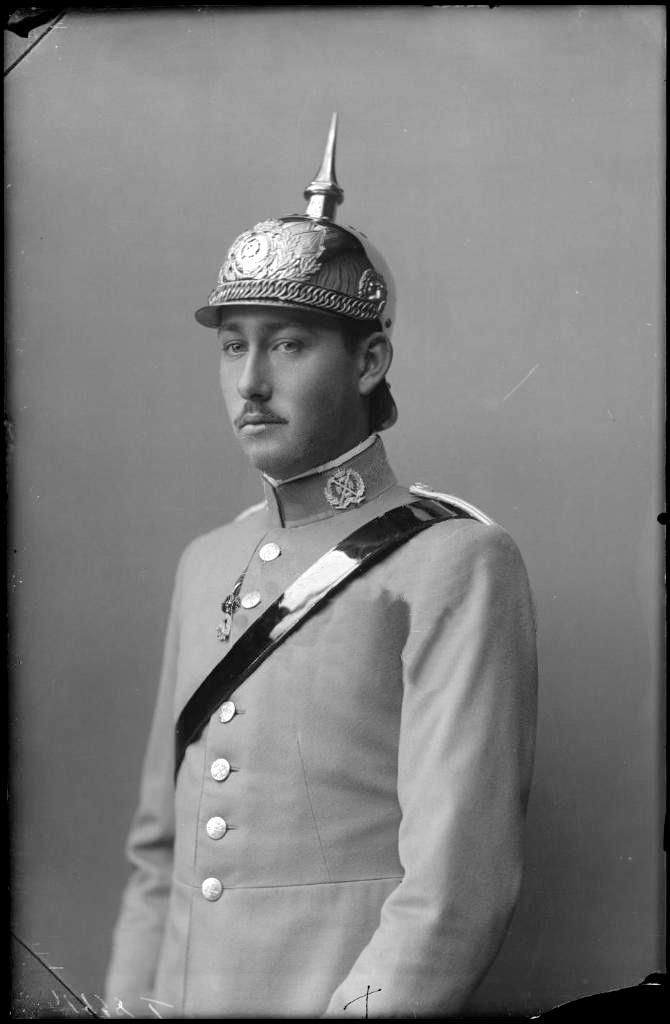
- Portrayed wearing a cavalry uniform of the Spanish Army, c. 1914
- Born: 11 January 1897; Cannes, France
- Died: 22 October 1975 (aged 78); Itu, Brazil
- Spouse: Princess Malgorzata Izabella Czartoryska (m. 1927; died 1929) Princess Cecylia Lubomirska (m. 1932)
- Issue: Prince Antoine; Prince Jean; Princess Maria Margarita; Princess Marie Immaculata; Prince Casimir
Names
- Italian: Gabriele Maria Giuseppe Carlo Ignazio Antonio Alfonso Pietro Giovanni Gerardo di Majella et Omni Sancti
- House: House of Bourbon-Two Sicilies
- Father: Prince Alfonso, Count of Caserta
- Mother: Princess Maria Antonietta of Bourbon-Two Sicilies

Prince Gabriele of Bourbon-Two Sicilies (Gabriele Maria Giuseppe Carlo Ignazio Antonio Alfonso Pietro Giovanni Gerardo di Majella et Omni Sancti; 11 January 1897 – 22 October 1975) was a prince of the deposed dynasty which ruled the Kingdom of the Two Sicilies.

== Family ==
Gabriel was the twelfth child and youngest son of Prince Alfonso, Count of Caserta, and his wife, Princess Maria Antonietta of Bourbon-Two Sicilies.

== Marriage and issue ==
Gabriel married firstly Princess Malgorzata Izabella Czartoryska, daughter of Prince Adam Ludwik Czartoryski and Countess Maria Ludwika Krasińska, on 25 August 1927 in Paris. The couple had one child before Malgorzata died in Cannes on 8 March 1929:

- Prince Antoine of Bourbon-Two Sicilies (20 January 1929 in Cannes – 11 November 2019)

married Duchess Elisabeth of Württemberg (2 February 1933 in Stuttgart – 29 January 2022) on 18 July 1958 in Altshausen, and had issue:

- Prince Franz of Bourbon-Two Sicilies (born 20 June 1960 in Ravensburg)

married Countess Alexandra of Schönborn-Wiesentheid (2 June 1967 in Zurich) on 2 June 2000 in Geneva, and had issue:

- Prince Antoine of Bourbon-Two Sicilies (born 6 June 2003 in Geneva)
- Princess Dorothée of Bourbon-Two Sicilies (born 10 May 2005 in Zurich)

- Princess Maria Carolina of Bourbon-Two Sicilies (born 18 July 1962 in Friedrichshafen)

married Andreas Baumbach (born 30 April 1963 in Tübingen), on 6 May 1988 in Tübingen

- Prince Gennaro of Bourbon-Two Sicilies (born 27 January 1966 in Ravensburg)
- Princess Maria Annunziata of Bourbon-Two Sicilies (born 18 February 1973 in Friedrichshafen)

∞ Count Carl Fredrik Creutz (born 11 November 1971), on 2 August 2003 in Helsinki, and had issue.

Gabriel married, secondly, Princess Cecylia Lubomirska, daughter of Prince Kasimierz Lubomirski and Countess Maria Theresia Granow-Wodicka, on 15 September 1932 in Kraków. They had four children:

- Prince Jean of Bourbon-Two Sicilies (30 June 1933 in Warsaw – 25 December 2000 in Madrid)
- Princess Maria Margarita of Bourbon-Two Sicilies (16 November 1934 in Warsaw – 15 January 2014 in Madrid)

married Luis Gonzaga Maldonado y Gordon (17 November 1932 in Madrid – 11 June 1962 in Jerez de la Frontera)

- Princess Marie Immaculata of Bourbon-Two Sicilies (25 June 1937 in Warsaw – 14 May 2020 in Mallorca)

married Miguel García de Saéz y Tellecea (6 September 1921 – 12 March 1982), on 29 June 1970 in Sant Josep de sa Talaia; divorced in 1979

- Prince Casimir of Bourbon-Two Sicilies (born 8 November 1938 in Warsaw)

married Princess Maria Cristina of Savoy-Aosta (12 September 1933 in Miramare – 18 November 2023 in São Paulo), on 29 January 1967 in Jacarezinho

- Prince Luís of Bourbon-Two Sicilies (born 28 November 1970 in Rio de Janeiro)

married firstly, Christine Apovian (born 20 May 1969) on 22 October 1998 in São Paulo, subsequently divorced

- Anna Sophia di Borbone-Dos Sicilias (born 9 April 1999 in São Paulo)

married secondly, Maria da Glória Ganem Rubião

- Maria Isabel di Borbone-Dos Sicilias (2012)
- Luisa Fernanda di Borbone-Dos Sicilias (2014)
- Paulo Afonso di Borbone-Dos Sicilias (2014)

- Princess Anna Cecilia of Bourbon-Two Sicilies (born 24 December 1971 in São Paulo)

married Count Rodolphe de Causans (born 22 January 1973) civilly on 18 August 2005 in Les Verchers-sur-Layon, religiously on 19 September 2005 in Turin, and had issue.

- Princess Elena Sofia of Bourbon-Two Sicilies (born 10 September 1973 in São Paulo)
- Prince Alexander of Bourbon-Two Sicilies (born 9 August 1974 in São Paulo). Ordained a priest in Rome on 22 December 2007.

== Ancestry ==
Ancestors of Prince Gabriel of Bourbon-Two Sicilies

8. Francis I of the Two Sicilies
4. Ferdinand II of the Two Sicilies
9. Infanta Maria Isabella of Spain
2. Prince Alfonso, Count of Caserta
10. Archduke Charles, Duke of Teschen
5. Archduchess Maria Theresa of Austria
11. Princess Henrietta of Nassau-Weilburg
1. Prince Gabriel of Bourbon-Two Sicilies
12. Francis I of the Two Sicilies (= 8)
6. Prince Francis, Count of Trapani
13. Infanta Maria Isabella of Spain (= 9)
3. Princess Maria Antonietta of Bourbon-Two Sicilies
14. Leopold II, Grand Duke of Tuscany
7. Archduchess Maria Isabella of Austria
15. Princess Maria Antonia of the Two Sicilies
