= Adam Ludwik Czartoryski =

Polish nobleman and landowner

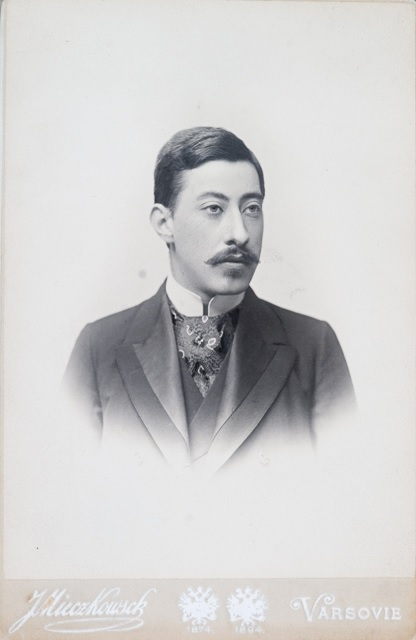
- Coat of arms: Czartoryski coat of arms
- Born: 5 November 1872; Paris, France
- Died: 29 June 1937 (aged 64); Warsaw, Poland
- Noble family: Czartoryski
- Spouse: Countess Maria Ludwika Krasińska (m. 1901)
- Issue: Małgorzata Izabella Czartoryska; Elżbieta Czartoryska; Augustyn Józef Czartoryski; Anna Maria Czartoryski; Władysław Czartoryski; Teresa Czartoryska; Ludwik Czartoryski
- Father: Prince Władysław Czartoryski
- Mother: Princess Marguerite of Orléans

Prince Adam Ludwik Czartoryski (5 November 1872 – 29 June 1937) was a Polish nobleman, landowner, and patron of the arts. He was the son of Prince Władysław Czartoryski and Princess Marguerite Adélaïde Marie of Orléans.

== Biography ==
Adam Ludwik was born in 1872. He became the head of the Czartoryski family after the death of his father in 1894. In 1897 he became Ordynat of the Sieniawa Ordynacja property. Capital assets were estimated at 4.5 million Austrian Crowns, which did not include the Family Collections. In 1899 Countess Izabela Działyńska, his aunt, left the Gołuchów Castle and estates to him and his brother Witold. In the same year Ludwik acquired many Greek objects during his travel to Japan.

In 1901, he married Countess Maria Ludwika Krasińska. His wife took over the direction of affairs and work.

In 1911, his brother Witold died and left Adam Czartoryski all his inheritance.

In 1914, Czartoryski served in the Austrian Army, and his wife Maria Ludwika took over the Czartoryski Museum. During the First World War, thanks to family connections to the King of Saxony, she sent the most valuable objects over to Dresden.

After the war, there was some difficulty retrieving the objects because of concern about unrest in Poland, but two years of negotiation, along with the 1919 Treaty of Riga which provided for the return of looted items, helped in reassembling the collection, a process which continued for the next several years. During this time the Hotel Lambert, their property in Paris, was transformed into apartments as the family had settled permanently in Poland.

== Death ==
On 26 June 1937, Prince Adam Ludwik died and was buried at the family crypt in Sieniawa.

== Issue ==
Prince Adam Ludwik and his wife, Countess Ludwika Krasińska had three sons and four daughters:

- Princess Malgorzata Izabella Czartoryska (1902-1929), married Prince Gabriel of Bourbon-Two Sicilies; had issue
- Princess Elżbieta Czartoryska (1905-1989), married Count Stefan Adam Zamoyski; had issue
- Prince Augustyn Józef Czartoryski (1907-1946), married Princess María de los Dolores of Bourbon-Two Sicilies; had issue
- Princess Yolanda Czartoryska (1914-1987), married Prince Wladyslaw Radziwill (1909-1978); had issue
- Prince Władysław Czartoryski (1918–1978), married Elizabeth York (1925-1983); didn't have issue
- Princess Teresa Czartoryska (1923-1976), married Jan Groda-Kowalski (b. 1917); had issue
- Prince Ludwik Czartoryski (1927-1944), died in Warsaw during a battle in WWII
