= Izabella Elżbieta Czartoryska =

Polish noblewoman (1832–1899)

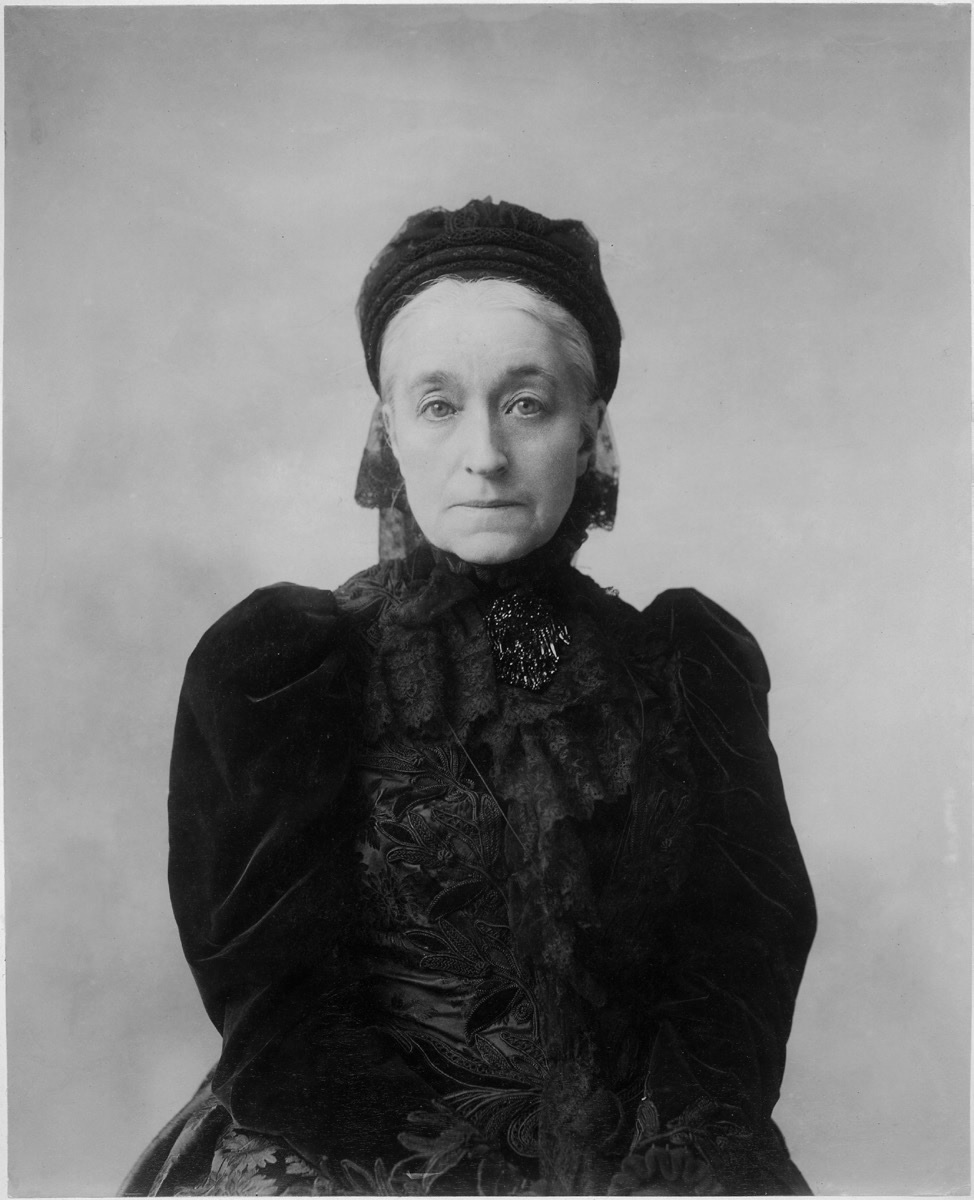
- Princess Izabella Elżbieta Czartoryska
- Coat of arms: Czartoryski coat of arms
- Born: 19 December 1832; Warsaw, Congress Poland
- Died: 18 March 1899 (aged 66); Menton, France
- Noble family: Czartoryski
- Spouse: Jan Kanty Działyński
- Father: Adam Jerzy Czartoryski
- Mother: Anna Zofia Sapieha

Princess Izabella Elżbieta Czartoryska (19 December 1832 – 18 March 1899) was a Polish noblewoman.

== Biography ==
Born into the powerful House of Czartoryski, she was a daughter of Prince Adam Jerzy Czartoryski and his wife, Princess Anna Zofia Sapieha, member of the equally powerful House of Sapieha. On 21 February 1857, Izabella was married to Count Jan Kanty Działyński (1829–1880), the son of Count Tytus Działyński in Paris, France. Their marriage produced no children.
