= Anna Zofia Sapieha =

Polish noblewoman (1799–1864)

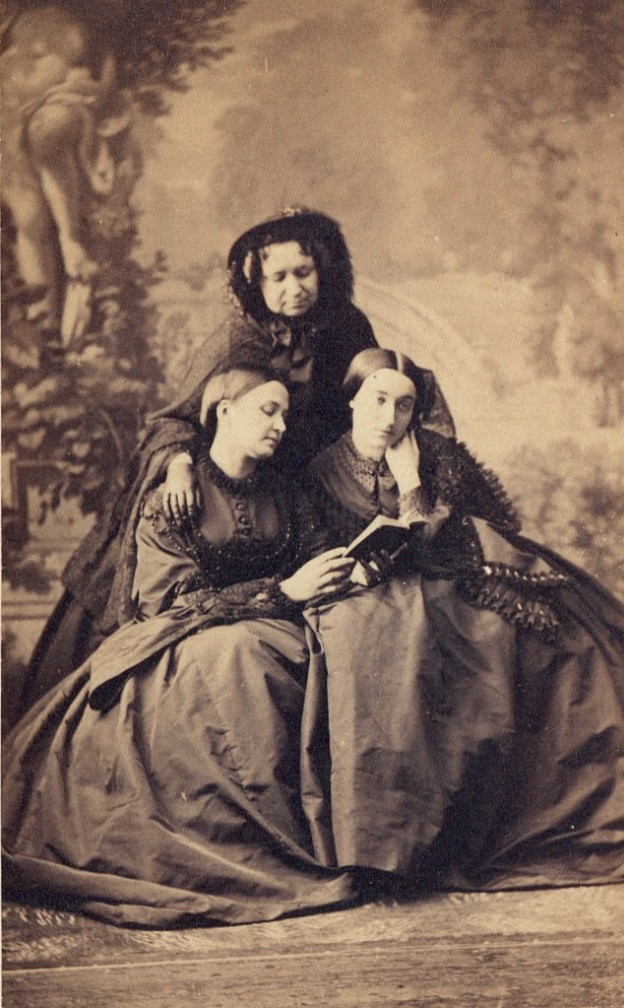
- Princess Anna Zofia with her daughter and daughter-in-law
- Coat of arms: Lis coat of arms
- Born: 17 October 1799; Saint-Germain-en-Laye, France
- Died: 24 November 1864 (aged 65); Montpellier, France
- Noble family: Sapieha
- consort: Adam Jerzy Czartoryski
- Issue: Witold Czartoryski; Władysław Czartoryski; Izabella Elżbieta Czartoryska
- Father: Aleksander Antoni Sapieha
- Mother: Anna Zamoyska

Princess Anna Zofia Sapieha (17 October 1799 – 24 November 1864) was a Polish noblewoman, notable as a philanthropist.

In France she was active in the Polish emigree community (Hôtel Lambert). She was particularly known for her charity activities.

She married Prince Adam Jerzy Czartoryski on 25 September 1817 in Radzyń.
