= Augustyn Józef Czartoryski =

Polish noble

- Coat of arms: Czartoryski coat of arms
- Born: 10 October 1907; Warsaw, Congress Poland
- Died: 1 July 1946 (aged 38); Seville, Spain
- Noble family: Czartoryski
- Spouse: Princess Maria de los Dolores of Borbon y Orleans (m. 1937)
- Issue: Adam Karol Czartoryski; Ludwik Piotr Czartoryski
- Father: Adam Ludwik Czartoryski
- Mother: Maria Ludwika Krasińska

Prince Augustyn Józef Czartoryski (10 October 1907 – 1 July 1946) was a Polish noble (szlachcic). He was the son of Prince Adam Ludwik Czartoryski (and grandson of Princess Marguerite Adélaïde of Orléans) and Countess Maria Ludwika Krasińska.

After the death of his father, Prince Augustyn took over the running of the Family Museum and became ordynat of the Sieniawa Ordynacja properties. On 12 August 1937, he married Princess Maria de los Dolores of Borbon y Orleans, daughter of Prince Carlos of Bourbon, Infante of Spain and Princess Louise of Orléans.

Due to the prospect of war, the most precious objects were transported to Sieniawa Palace and walled up:

The rest of the items are carried down to the Museum cellars, but in September as the bombs fall on Krakow Prince Agustyn and Princess Dolores already pregnant decide to leave Sieniawa for a better refuge. On the 18th of September German troops find the cases and loot for small tradable objects.

After the Germans move on Prince Agustyn removes all the treasures to his cousin's estate in Pełkinie saving them from the Russian army, but the Gestapo traces all objects and removes all important cases from their hiding places and soon after Prince Agustyn and Princess Dolores are picked up by the Gestapo and put under arrest. After heavy negotiation and thanks to their Royal Italian and Spanish connections they are deported and manage to reach Spain before the end of 1939.

During his exile in Spain Prince Augustyn was very active in the Polish resistance, but his poor health and his desperation had its toll on his life. He died at the age of 39, leaving his young son Adam Karol to be brought up in Spain.

In 1946, Prince Augustyn died and was buried in the crypt of the Salesian Church in Seville, Spain, along his son Ludwik Piotr who died at the age of one.

== See also ==
- Infanta Luisa Fernanda, Duchess of Montpensier
