= Duke Adam of Württemberg =

Duke of Württemberg (1792–1847)

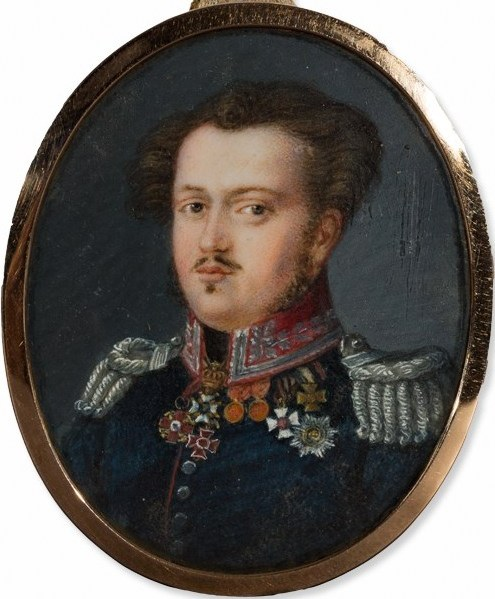
Portrait miniature (gouache on ivory) by anonymous, c. 1815–1820

Adam Karl Wilhelm Nikolaus Paul Eugen von Württemberg (16 January 1792 – 26 July 1847) was a Duke of Württemberg and General in Russian and Polish-Russian service.

Württemberg was born in Puławy to Duke Louis of Württemberg (1756–1817) and Princess Maria Anna Czartoryska (1768–1854). After his parents divorced in 1793 he was raised by his father and, as a nephew of the Russian Empress consort Maria Feodorovna, he was one of the playfellows of the later Tsar Nicholas I of Russia and soon joined the Tsarist Russian Army. During the occupation of France, in 1815, he was the chief of the army of Würtemberg in the department of Allier. Throughout the Polish November Uprising of 1830 he commanded the Russian avantguard troops of General Cyprian Kreutz and was defeated on 19 February 1831 by the Polish forces of General Józef Dwernicki prior to the Battle of Olszynka Grochowska.

Württemberg became a lieutenant general and adjutant of Tsar Nicholas I; after his dismissal he returned to Germany, where he died in Langenschwalbach.

== Ancestry ==
Ancestors of Duke Adam of Württemberg

8. Charles Alexander, Duke of Württemberg
4. Frederick II Eugene, Duke of Württemberg
9. Princess Maria Augusta of Thurn and Taxis
2. Duke Louis of Württemberg
10. Frederick William, Margrave of Brandenburg-Schwedt
5. Princess Friederike of Brandenburg-Schwedt
11. Princess Sophia Dorothea of Prussia
1. Duke Adam of Württemberg
12. Prince August Aleksander Czartoryski
6. Prince Adam Kazimierz Czartoryski
13. Countess Zofia Sieniawska
3. Princess Maria Czartoryska
14. Count Georg Detlev von Flemming
7. Countess Izabela von Flemming
15. Princess Antonina Czartoryska
