= Maria Wirtemberska =

Duchess Louis of Württenberg (1768–1854)

Princess Maria
- Duchess Louis of Württenberg
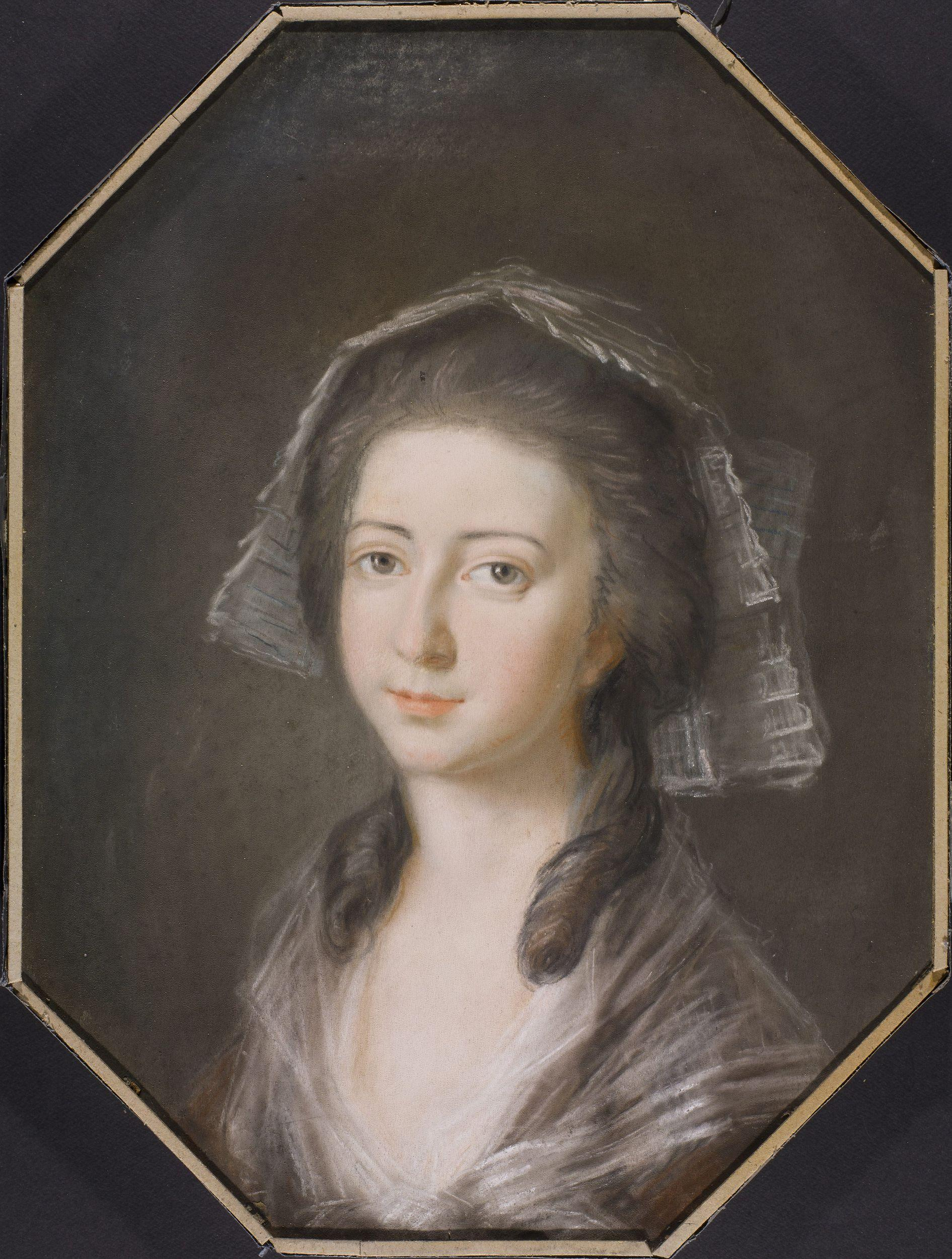
- Born: 15 March 1768; Warsaw, Polish–Lithuanian Commonwealth
- Died: 21 October 1854 (aged 86); Paris, France
- Spouse: Duke Louis of Württemberg (m. 1784; div. 1793)
- Issue: Duke Adam of Württemberg
Names
- Maria Anna
- House: Czartoryski
- Father: Prince Adam Czartoryski
- Mother: Countess Izabela von Flemming

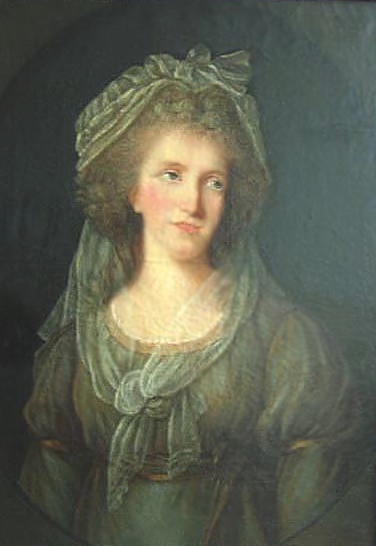
Princess Maria Czartoryska Wirtemberska, by Élisabet Vigée Le Brun 1793.

Princess Maria Czartoryska (formerly Duchess Louis of Württemberg; 15 March 1768, Warsaw – 21 October 1854, Paris), was a Polish noble, member of the House of Württemberg, writer, musician and philanthropist.

== Early life ==
Born into the powerful Polish House of Czartoryski, Maria Anna was a daughter of Prince Adam Kazimierz Czartoryski and Countess Izabela Czartoryska née von Fleming. It was widely accepted that she was the natural daughter of king Stanisław August Poniatowski. She spent her childhood in the Blue Palace (Polish: Pałac Błękitny, Pałac Zamoyskich) in Warsaw and in the summer palace in Powązki. In 1782 she moved with her parents to Czartoryski Palace in Puławy.

Her half-siblings were Teresa Czartoryska (1765–1780), Adam Jerzy Czartoryski, Konstanty Adam Czartoryski, Gabriela Czartoryska (d. 1780), Zofia Czartoryska and Cecylia Beydale (1787–1851).

== Marriage ==
Maria was married 28 October 1784 in Siedlce to Duke Louis of Württemberg, brother of Empress Maria Feodorovna, who served as a military in the Polish army (he was then known as Ludwik Wirtemberski, the Polish version of his name). He became the Hetman of the Lithuanian Army in the 1792 war against Russia. Maria divorced him in 1793 when his betrayal of the Polish–Lithuanian Commonwealth became known. Maria's only son, Duke Adam of Württemberg, remained with his father and was raised in an atmosphere prejudiced against his mother and Poland.

== Life after divorce ==
Following her divorce, Maria lived mostly in Warsaw, and from 1798 to 1804 spent winters in Vienna and summers at Puławy. Between 1808 and 1816 she hosted her literary salon in Warsaw (Blue Saturdays). Her guests included Julian Ursyn Niemcewicz. She attended meetings of the Xs Society (Towarzystwo Iksów). In 1816 she published Malvina, or the Heart's Intuition, considered Poland's first psychological novel.

From July 1816 to June 1818, Maria, together with her half-sister Cecylia Beydale, went on a grand foreign journey through Silesia, Bohemia, Austria, Italy and Switzerland.

Charmed with the picturesque village of Pilica she bought it and remodelled its landscape garden. She built a palace and a Catholic church. The park in Pilica was considered among the most beautiful in Europe, and rivalled other parks in Poland: Powązki (established by Maria's mother Izabela Czartoryska) and Helena Radziwiłł's Arkadia. Maria hired Franciszek Lessel as her land agent.

Maria Wirtemberska was an active philanthropist. She provided education and published calendars for the peasantry.

Following the November Uprising 1831 Maria moved with her mother Izabela Czartoryska to Czartoryski Palace in Sieniawa, then to Wysocko in Galicia. After the death of her mother in 1835, she moved in 1837 to Paris, where she lived with her brother, Prince Adam Jerzy Czartoryski.

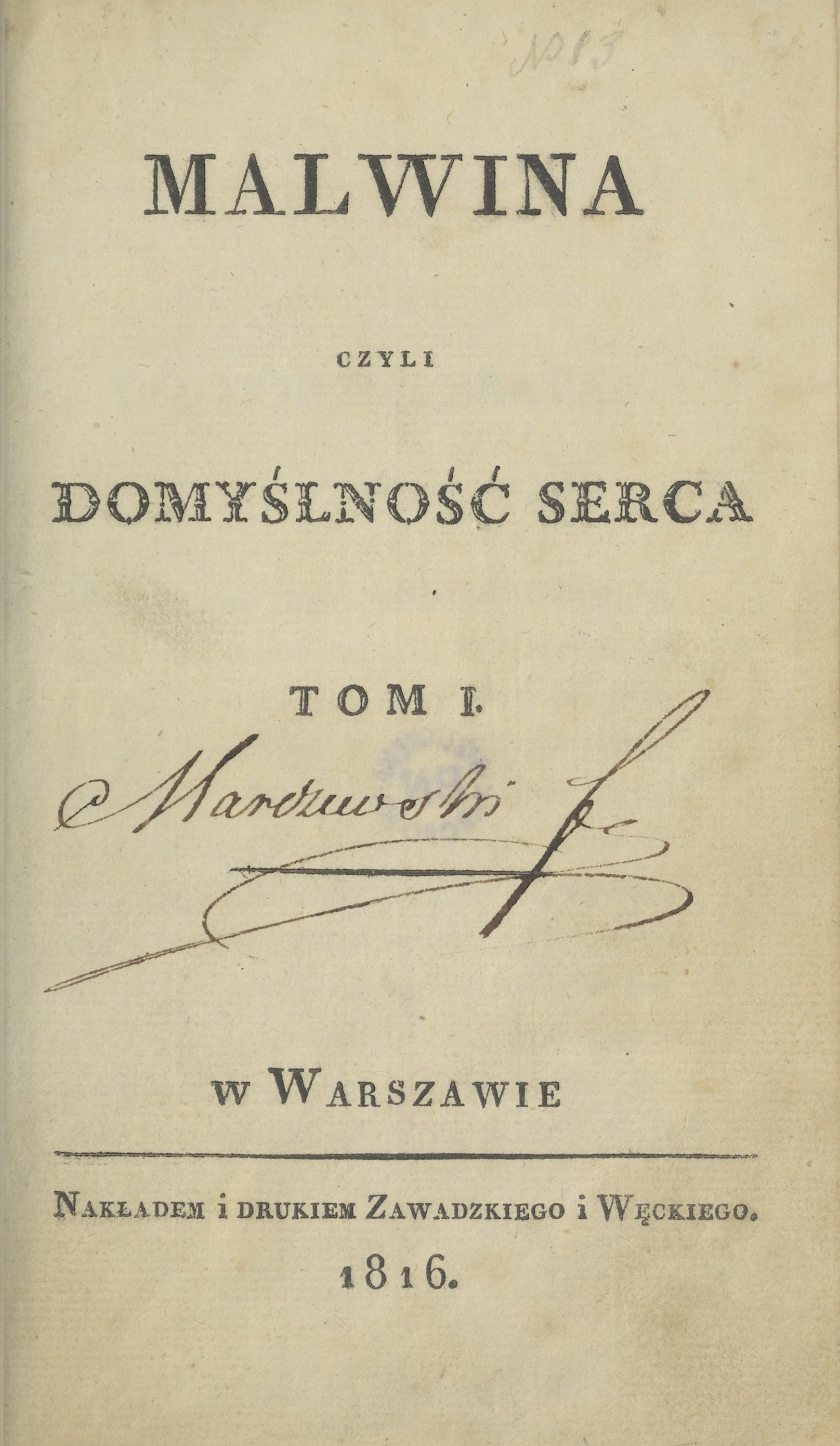
Title page of Malwina czyli Domyslnosc serca - romans oryginalny. (Malwina, or the Heart's Ingenuity - an original romance.) Vol. 1, Warsaw: Zawadzki i Węcki, 1816.

In 1838, her half-sister Cecylia moved to Paris with her sister and guardian Maria, to the Hôtel Lambert, which became the property of the Czartoryski family in 1842. Cecylia Beydale died there on July 21, 1851, and was buried in the cemetery in Montmorency. Three years later, Maria Czartoryska died at the age of 86 and was buried in the same tomb. A few years later, the remains of both women were transferred to the Czartoryski mausoleum in Sieniawa.

== Works ==
=== Book ===
- Malvina, or the Heart's Intuition, 1816 (English translation by Ursula Phillips published by Northern Illinois University Press, 2012 ISBN 978-0875804507)

=== Chamber music ===
- piano pieces (published by Antoni Kocipinski)

=== Vocal music ===
- Stefan Potocki (published by Rogoczy)

== Gallery ==
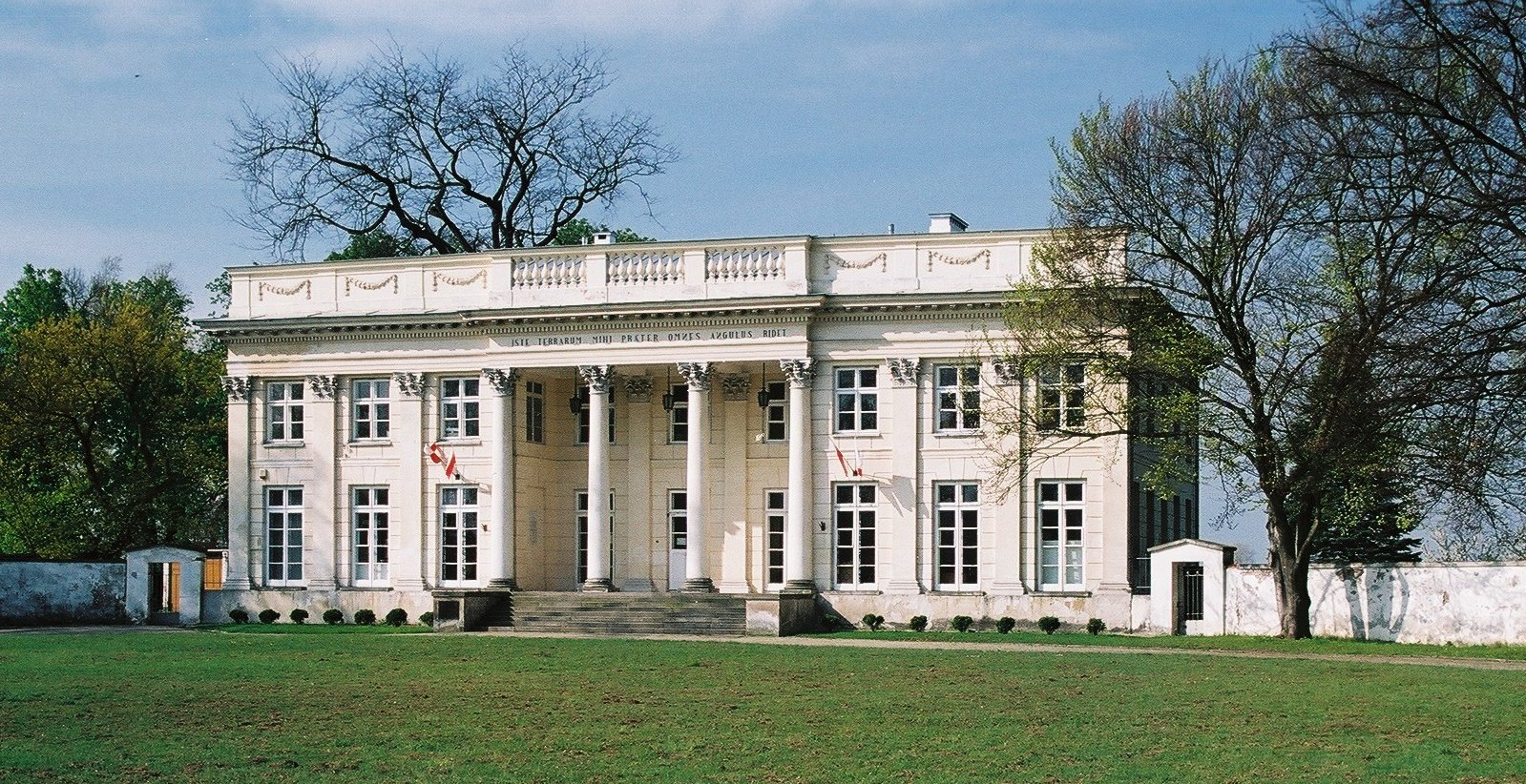
Marynka's Palace, Puławy, was built 1791–1796 for Maria and her husband by her mother.

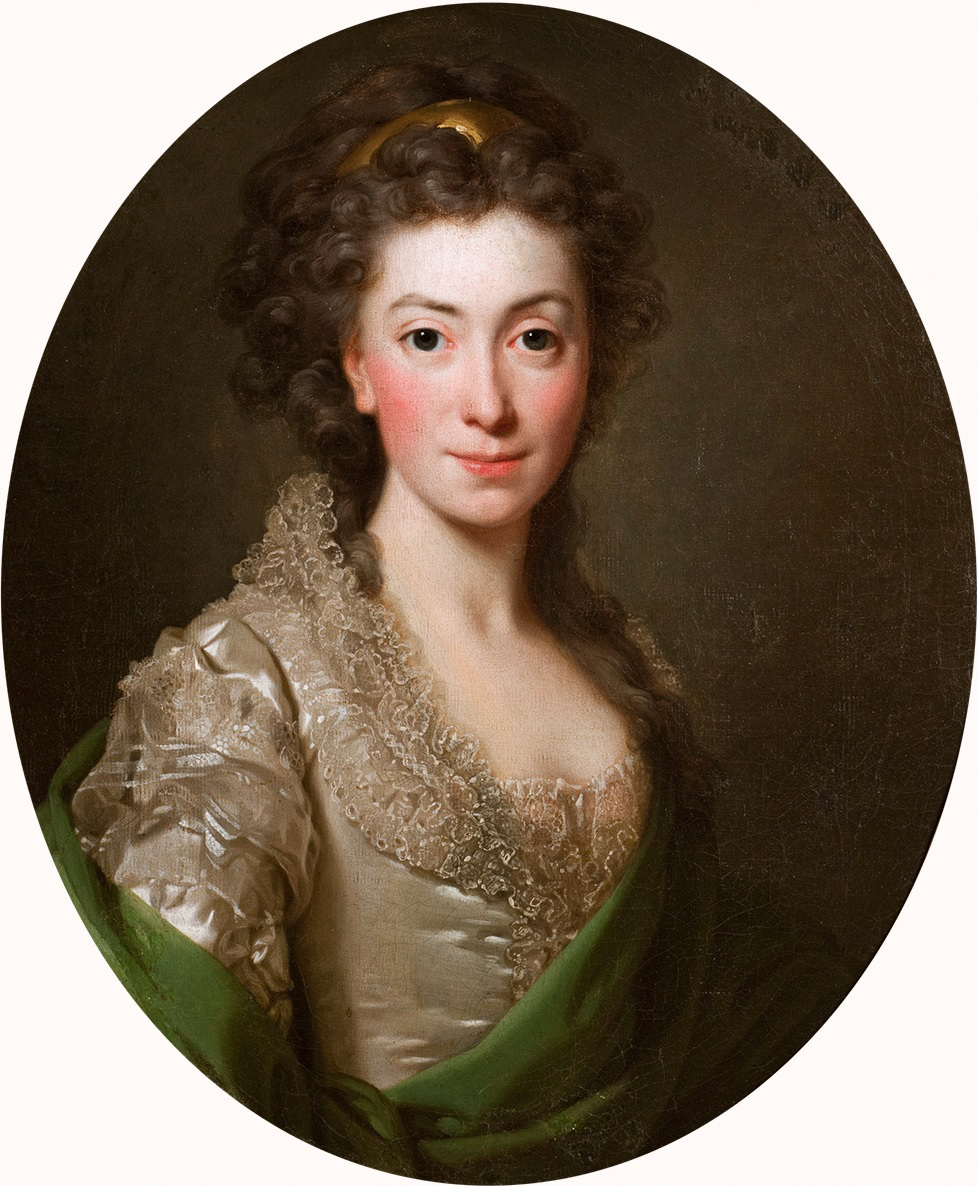
Izabela Czartoryska, née Fleming, Maria's mother.

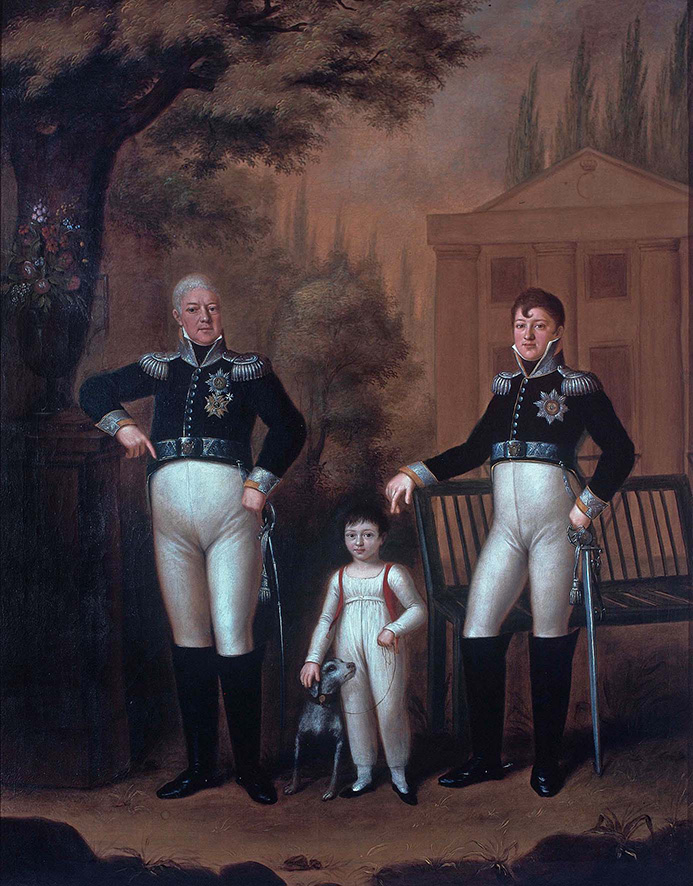
Husband Duke Louis of Württemberg, 1800.

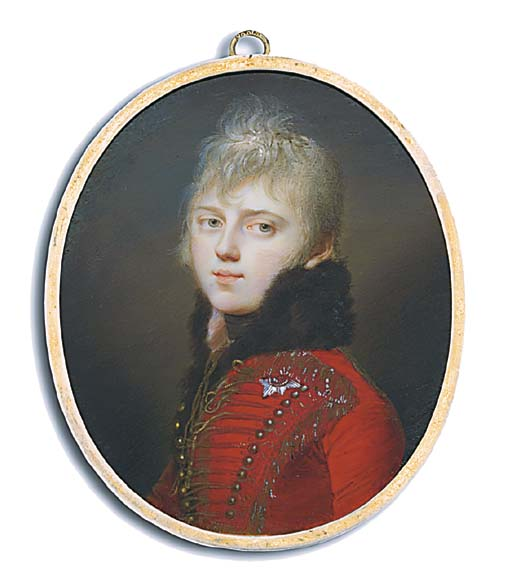
Duke Adam of Württemberg, Maria's son. Portrait by Johann Dominik Bossi, 1805.
