= Izabela Czartoryska =

Polish princess (1746–1835)

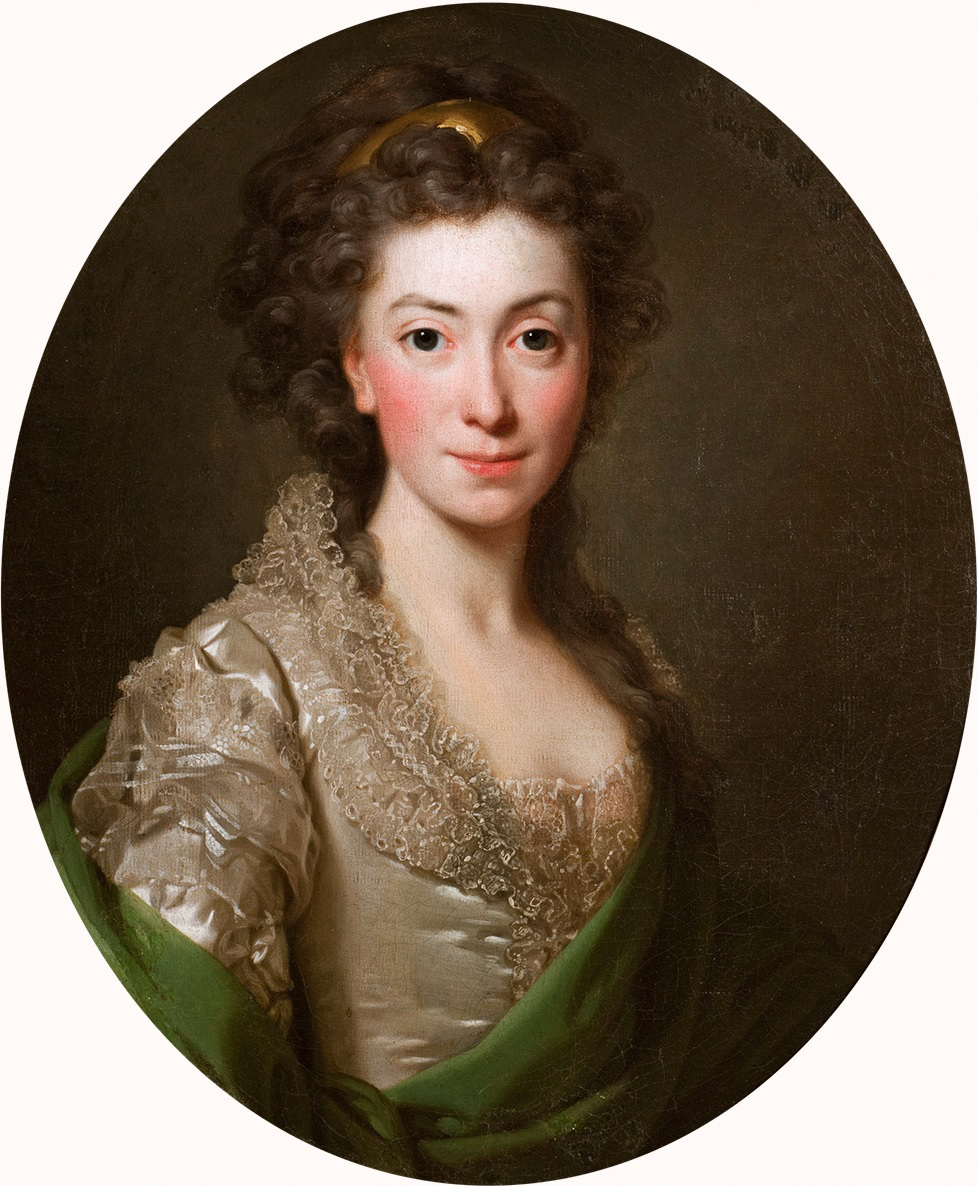
- Portrait by Alexander Roslin, 1774
- Full name: Elżbieta (Izabela) Dorota Czartoryska, née von Flemming
- Born: 31 March 1745; Warsaw, Polish-Lithuanian Commonwealth
- Died: 15 July 1835 (aged 90); Wysocko, Austrian Empire
- Noble family: House of Czartoryski
- Spouse: Adam Kazimierz Czartoryski (m. 1761; d. 1823)
- Issue: Teresa Czartoryska (1765–1780); Maria Anna Czartoryska; Adam Jerzy Czartoryski; Konstanty Adam Czartoryski; Gabriela Czartoryska (d. 1780); Zofia Czartoryska; Cecylia Beydale (b. 1787)
- Father: Georg Detlev von Flemming
- Mother: Antonina Czartoryska
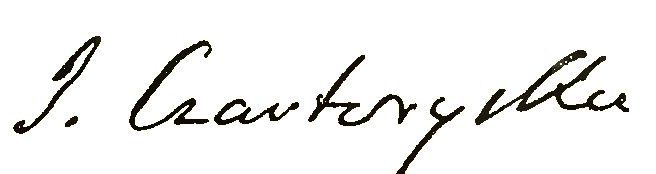
- Signature

Elżbieta (Izabela) Dorota Czartoryska (née Flemming; 31 March 1745 – 15 July 1835) was a Polish countess and princess, writer, art collector, and prominent figure in the Polish Enlightenment. She was the wife of Adam Kazimierz Czartoryski and a member of the influential Familia political party.

She is also known for having founded in 1796 Poland's first museum, the Czartoryski Museum, now located in Kraków.

== Early life ==
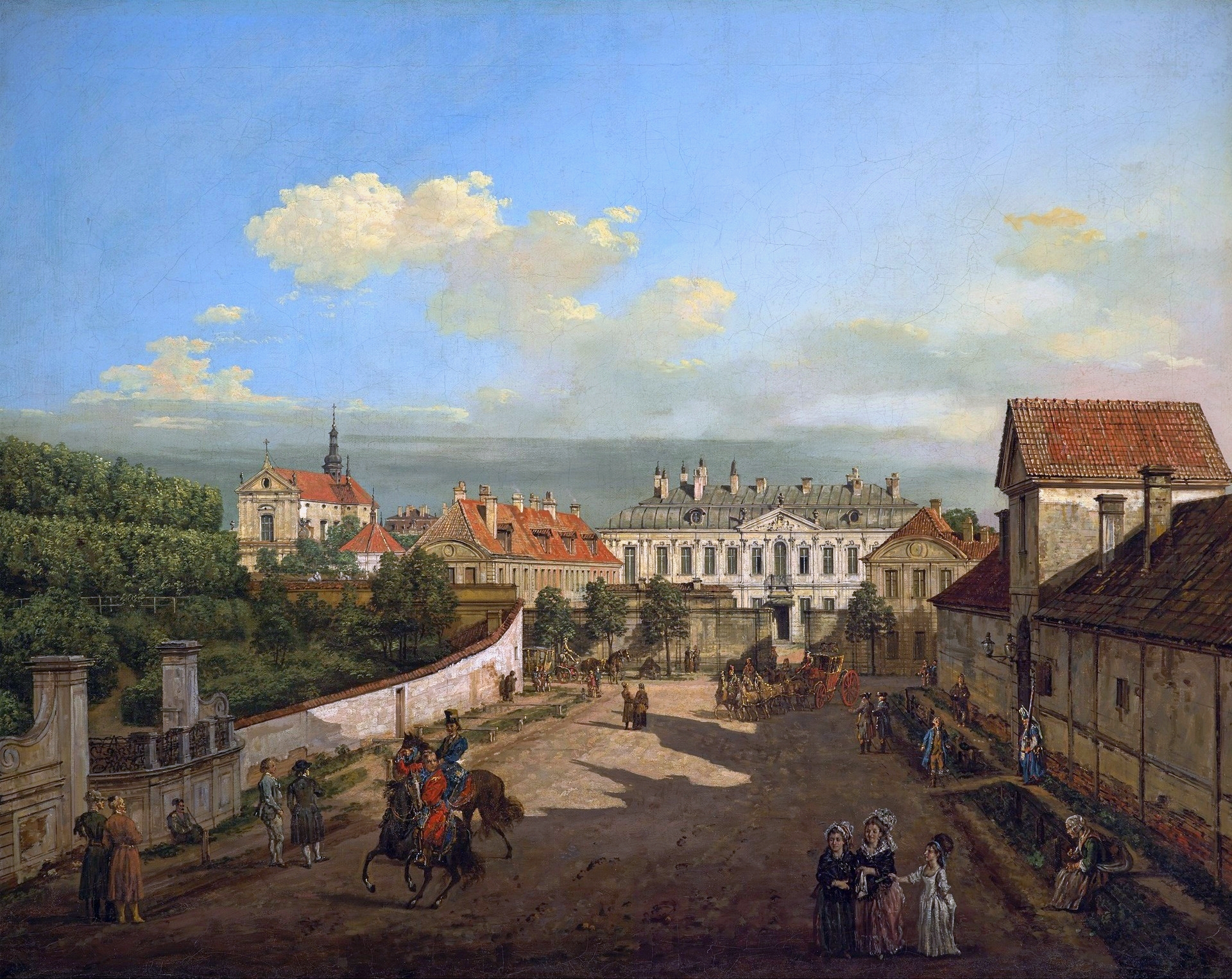
Blue Palace in Warsaw, by Barnardo Bellotto 1779.

She was the daughter and the only child of Count Georg Detlev von Flemming, known in Poland as Jerzy Detloff Flemming, Grand Lithuanian Treasurer, and Princess Antonina Czartoryska (1728–1746). Her father, who was descended from German aristocracy settled in Swedish Pomerania, or Western Pomerania, did not speak Polish well until his death, but he actively participated in the country's political life and was associated with the Czartoryski party. Izabela did not know her mother, as she died in childbirth in February 1746 when Izabela was less than one year old. In her memoirs, Izabela recounted:

My mother died in childbirth. My father then married her sister. [Konstancja (1729–1749)] Two years later, the latter passed away. Both sisters died at the age of 22, both on March 27, both from smallpox, both in the same house in Warsaw, both in the same bed.

The girl grew up in Warsaw and in the Wołczyn Palace near Brest (now in Belarus) under the care of her grandmother Eleonora (née Waldstein), wife of Michał Fryderyk Czartoryski.

== Marriage, affairs and children ==
On 19 November 1761, in Wołczyn, she married her second cousin, Prince Adam Kazimierz Czartoryski, thus becoming a princess. Her son Adam Jerzy Czartoryski wrote in his memoirs that prior to the marriage, 16-year-old Izabela fell ill with smallpox and that his aunt, groom's sister Elżbieta Izabela Lubomirska, in horror at the bride's pockmarked face, tried in vain to prevent the marriage to her brother. Czartoryski had a vast estate, was known for his elegance, was a connoisseur of literature and art, wrote plays himself, spoke over a dozen languages, including Arabic, Turkish and Persian, and was a future commander of the Corps of Cadets. The real reason for the wedding, was to bind two influential families who were related to each other. Georg Detlov Flemming gave his daughter Izabela 800,000 zlotys and extensive estates as a dowry.

After the wedding, the young couple settled in Oleszyce (now in the Carpathian Voivodeship) and spent the winter months in the Blue Palace (pl. Pałac Błękitny, Palais Zamoysky) in Warsaw. The Princess felt uncomfortable there – her husband treated her disrespectfully, and she had to endure humiliation from her sister-in-law Izabela Lubomirska. However, she enjoyed the affection of her cousin, the future King of Poland Stanisław Poniatowski, who defended her and later became one of her lovers.

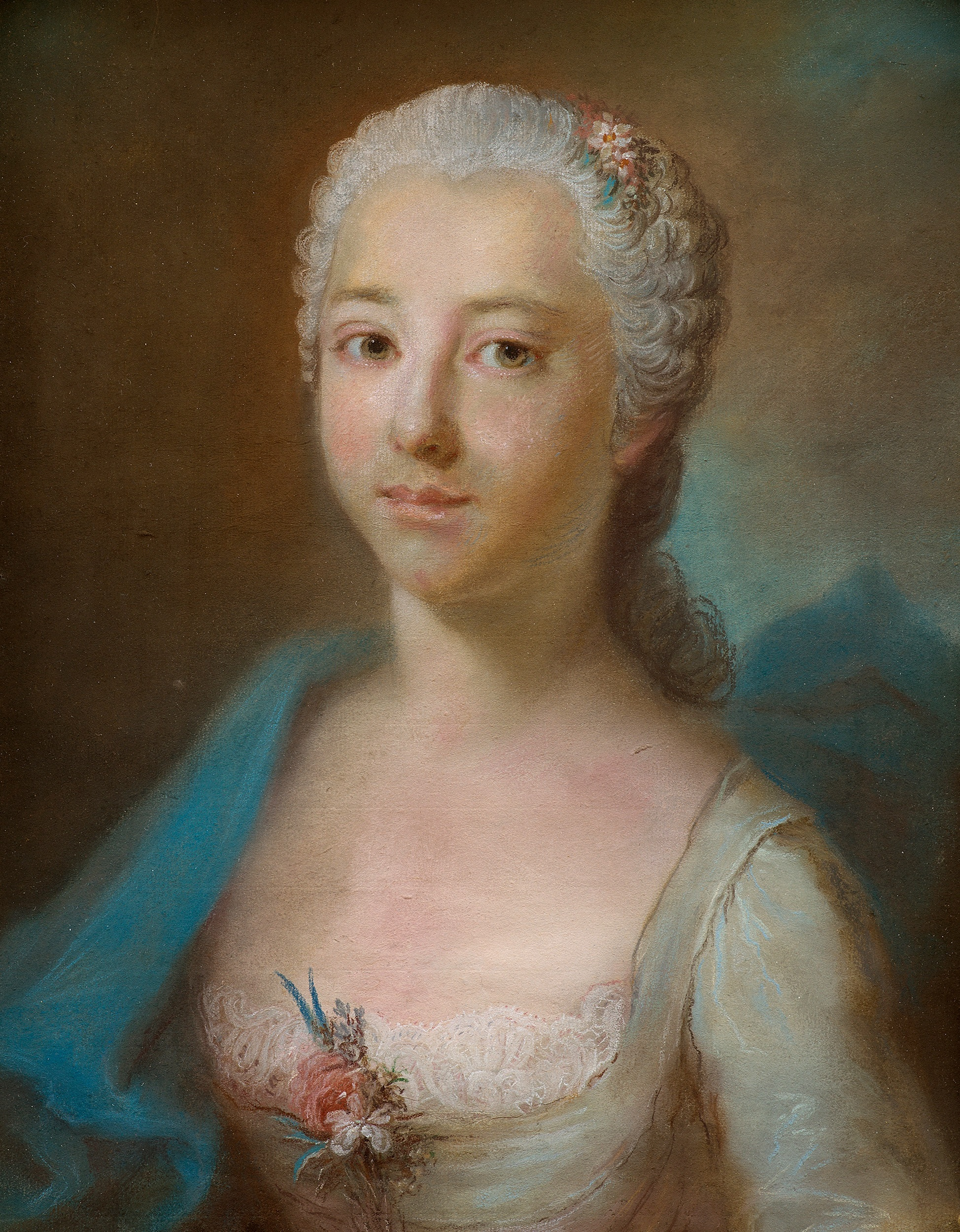
Izabela Czartoryska, by Louis Marteau ca. 1761

Feeling uncomfortable in her estates, the Princess traveled abroad with her husband, accompanying him disguised as a male page. This sometimes caused misunderstandings; for example, in Frankfurt am Main she was mistaken for a Danish prince, and in Mainz she even became the victim of sexual harassment by an older woman. These trips played a significant role in Czartoryska's intellectual development, which her husband also encouraged. Together they visited Jean-Jacques Rousseau and were also entertained in the salons of the French aristocracy.

She was rumored to have had an affair with the Russian ambassador to Poland, Nikolai Vasilyevich Repnin, who was alleged to have fathered her son Adam George Czartoryski. She had also an affair with the Armand Louis de Gontaut, Duke de Lauzun, who says himself in his "Mémoires" he fathered her second son Konstanty Adam.

In Paris in 1772, she met Benjamin Franklin, subsequently a leader of the American Revolution, and the French philosophers Jean-Jacques Rousseau and Voltaire, who were bringing new ideas to the old order.

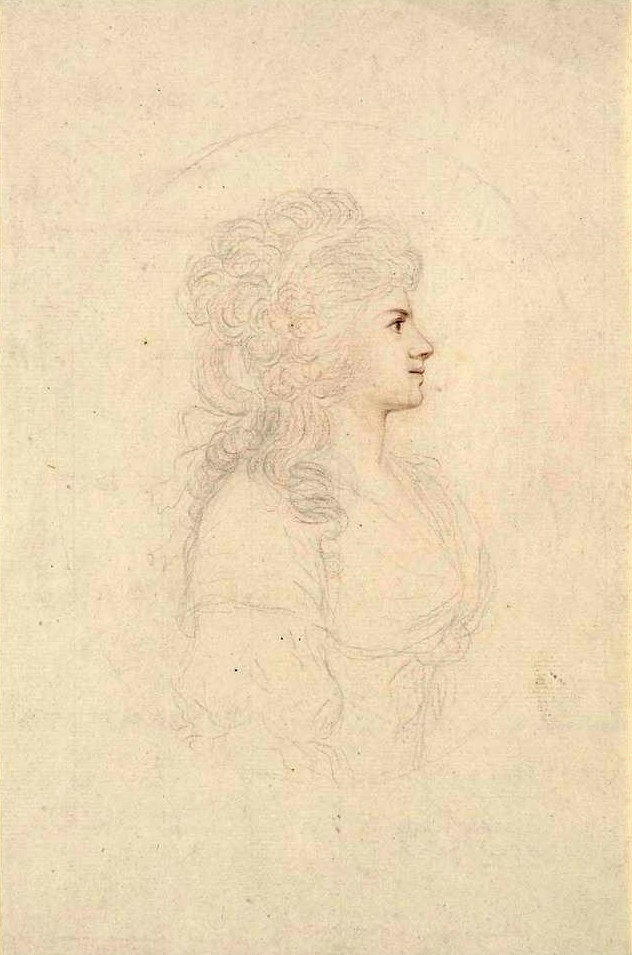
Princess Izabela Czartoryski, unknown artist 1760's-1770's.

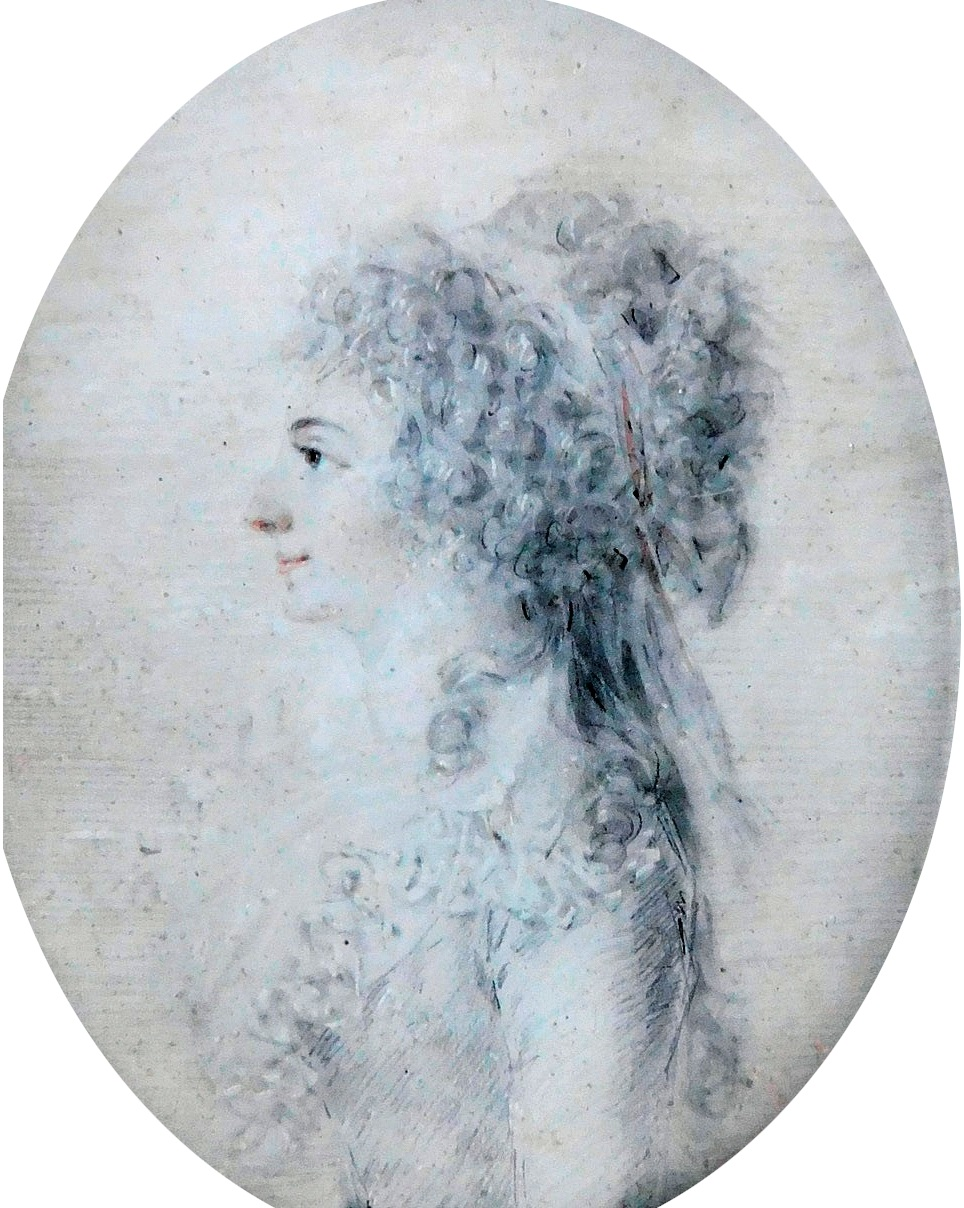
Izabela Czartoryska, by Jan Piotr Norblin 1785

Even during the lifetime of Augustus III, who died in 1763, the Czartoryski party, the Familia, sought to seize power in Poland with Russian support. Prince Adam Casimir was initially proposed as the new king, and was also encouraged to ascend the Polish throne by Tsar Peter III during his visit to Saint Petersburg in 1762. Adam Casimir, who was more interested in literature, art, and science, declined, claiming that he did not feel capable of taking responsibility for a state sinking into anarchy. Empress Catherine II, who took power in Russia after the overthrow and murder of her husband Peter III, also rejected his candidacy. She feared that his wealth and intellectual talents would make him too independent; he also knew from his Warsaw envoy Nikolai Repnin and King Frederick II of Prussia that the Czartoryskis intended to abolish the liberum veto and introduce reforms that would threaten Russia's dominance in the state. Finally, in 1765, the new ruler was also Stanisław Poniatowski, a former favorite of Catherine, who belonged to the family and took the name Stanisław August after his coronation; husband Adam Kazimierz had to be content with the post of marshal of the convocation sejm. After the election of the new ruler, Izabela and her husband continued their active social life in Warsaw. They performed together in amateur plays at the Théâtre de Société, which was held in the Kazimierzowski Palace (now the site of the University of Warsaw). Although the 19-year-old Czartoryska was not particularly striking in appearance, she often played love roles in these plays and also began a brief affair with the theater director Count Alojzy Fryderyk von Brühl. Despite this brief relationship, this period also marked, according to Gabriela Pauszer-Klonowska, the beginning of a genuine rapprochement and budding love between the couple, who had previously considered their marriage more of a business. The couple remained together until the end of Adam Kazimierz's life, although both continued to have numerous extramarital affairs.

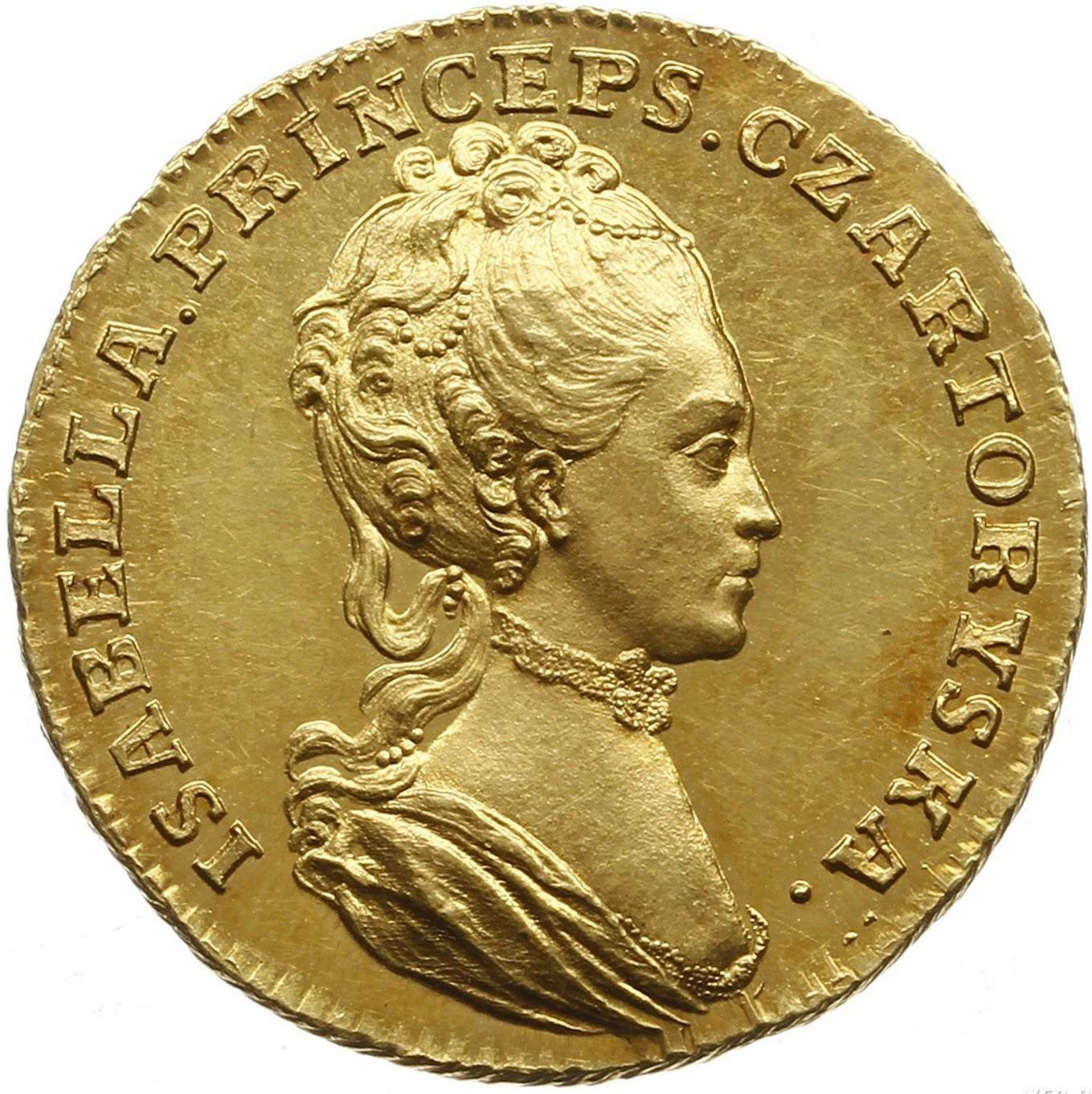
Izabela Czartoryska 1772 in a medal.

In 1765, the Princess gave birth to her first daughter, Teresa. According to contemporaries, she became very beautiful after giving birth. Giacomo Casanova, who met the Czartoryskis that same year, wrote that "the prince married a very beautiful woman, but he has not yet had a child with her, because she is too thin for him", which would suggest that Teresa was perhaps the result of an affair. One of the memoirs of the time stated: "There was an indescribable grace in her gaze and movements", and according to Julian Ursyn Niemcewicz (adjutant to Prince Adam Kazimierz), "nothing could compare with the brilliance of her black eyes and the whiteness of her sex". From then on, Izabela became one of the magnets of Warsaw's social life.

Czartoryska herself assessed her physical condition quite highly later, at the age of 35, writing about it as follows:

I have never been beautiful, but I have often been pretty. I have beautiful eyes, and because they reflect all the feelings of the soul, my face can be fascinating. I am quite white, my forehead is smooth and flawless, my nose is neither ugly nor beautiful, my mouth is large, my teeth are white, my smile is pleasant, and my face is beautifully oval. I have enough hair to easily adorn my head; it is as dark as my eyebrows. I am rather tall than short, my waist is slender, my chest perhaps too thin, my hands are ugly, but my legs are lovely, and my movements are very graceful. My faces are similar in this respect – the greatest charm of both depended on the skill with which I was able to double their value. In my youth I was very flirtatious; I am less so every day, although my feminine gender sometimes still reminds me that pleasing others is a great charm in itself.

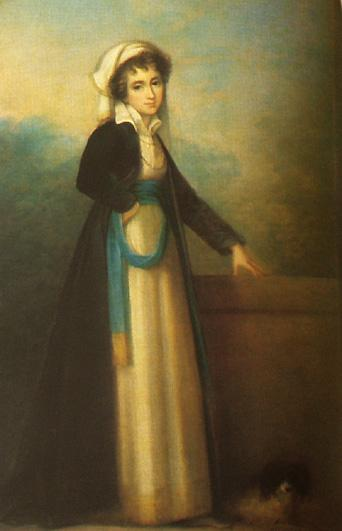
Izabela Czartoryska, by Maria Cosway 1790.

Probably around 1765, Czartoryska's affection for her cousin "Antoś" (i.e. King Stanisław August Poniatowski) developed into a deeper love. Izabela's relationship with Stanisław was widely known in Warsaw. Her husband also knew about it and tolerated the affair, even driving the duchess to the castle to meet the king, while she herself sought love affairs elsewhere. The fruit of Czartoryska's and Poniatowski's union was a daughter, Maria Anna, who later became a writer, born in March 1768 and was maliciously called "Ciołkówna" on the street (Ciołek was Stanisław August Poniatowski's coat of arms and also his contemptuous nickname).

At the same time, Izabela Czartoryska began an affair with the Russian envoy Nikolai Repnin, who represented Catherine II's interests in Warsaw and was tasked with thwarting Polish reform efforts at the time. Isabella gave in to Repnin, for whom she had no feelings, at the request of the king and her husband Adam, who hoped to curry favor with the envoy. On Ash Wednesday, 4 March 1767 Czartoryska and Repnin caused a widespread uproar in Warsaw when Repnin rented an entire theatre, which should normally have been closed that day, and ordered a French comedy to be performed for himself, Izabela, and the staff of the legation. Finally, on 14 October 1767, the Princess unwittingly contributed to one of the greatest crimes committed by Russia in 18th-century Poland. When the king learned of the plans of the Bishop of Kraków, Kajetan Sołtyk, to launch a crusade against the Dissenters, he asked Isabella to arrange a joint meeting with Repnin. As a result of this meeting, at the king's request, Kajetan Sołtyk, the Crown Field Hetman Wacław Rzewuski, his son Seweryn Rzewuski, and the Bishop of Kiev Józef Załuski were kidnapped and exiled to Kaluga in Russia.

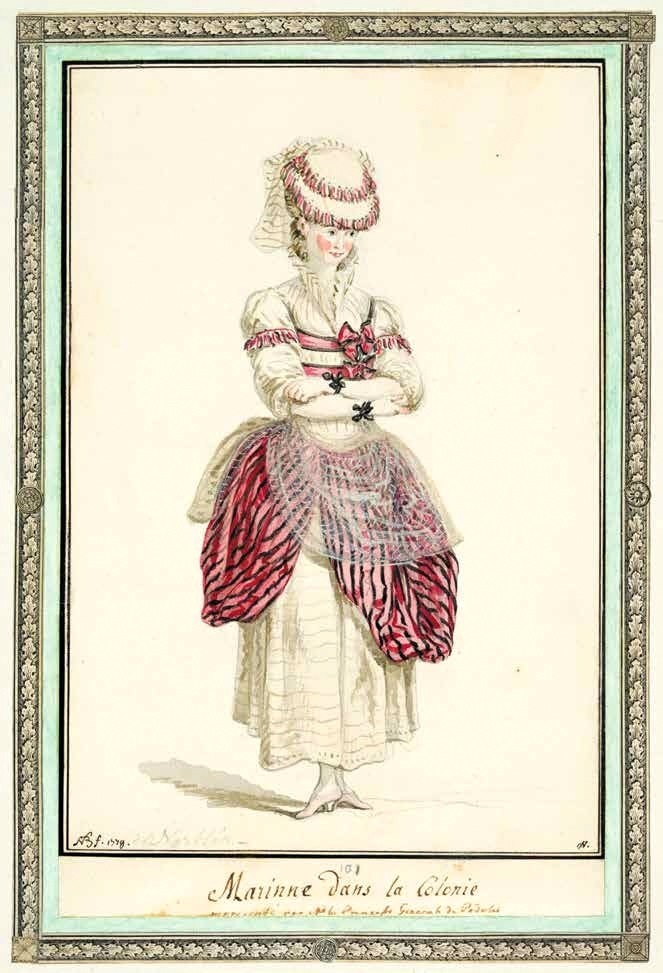
Izabela Czartoryska as the gardener Marianne "dans le Celenie", by Jean-Pierre Norblin 1779-1780.

Nikolai Repnin's humiliations and Russian interference in Polish internal affairs eventually led to the establishment of the Confederation of Bari in February 1768 and the outbreak of the uprising. Izabela and husband Adam Kazimierz Czartoryski, wishing to avoid the threat of battle, spent part of this time traveling around Europe. At the same time, on 10 April 1769, Empress Catherine II dismissed Nikolai Repnin from his post. The reason for the separation was the Empress's dissatisfaction with the insufficient protection of Russian interests in Poland, but also the ambassador's relationship with Czartoryski. Repnin, who initially considered the relationship a fleeting fling, fell in love with Izabela. From this union, on 14 January 1770, the Princess's firstborn son, Adam Jerzy Czartoryski, was born, who later became a politician and the leader of the Hôtel Lambert group in Paris.

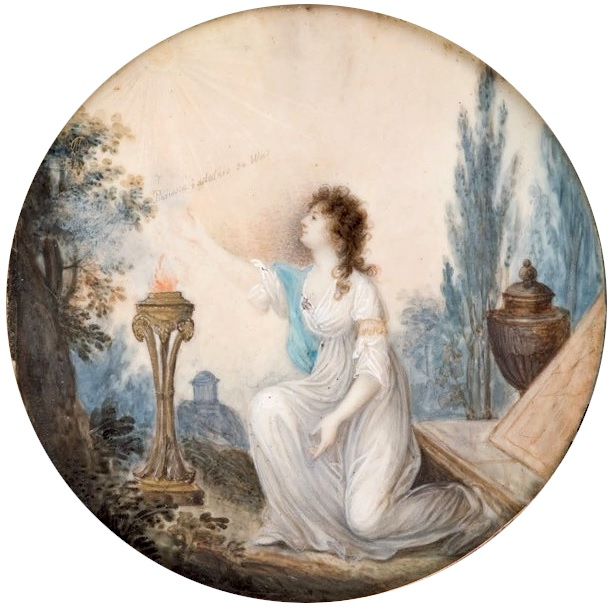
Izabela Czartoryska as Sibyl of Puławy, by Józef Kosiński 1800

In 1772, the Princess traveled with her husband to the Netherlands to settle the inheritance of her deceased father, Georg Detlev von Flemming, and to sell the county of Berkeloo that had belonged to him. In the autumn of 1772, she was in London, where Nikolai Repnin also traveled with her. There, she met, among others, Benjamin Franklin, later an American politician, who cured her of a momentary depression by playing the harmonium. In a London salon, she also met the French duke Armand Louis de Gontaut de Lauzun, often contemptuously called "the Duke of Lausanne" in Polish society circles, and with whom she experienced her most turbulent romance. Her first contact with Czartoryska made a strong impression on the Duke, even though he was married. He wrote about their meeting in his memoirs:

A woman entered the room, better dressed and with a better coiffure than English women usually are. I asked about her and was told that she was a Polish woman, Princess Czartoryska. Of medium height, but of a magnificent figure, with beautiful eyes, the most beautiful hair, the most beautiful teeth, lovely legs, and a very dark complexion, though aged and disfigured by smallpox. By her gentle manner and her movements of incomparable charm, Mrs. Czartoryska proved that one can be charming without being at all beautiful.

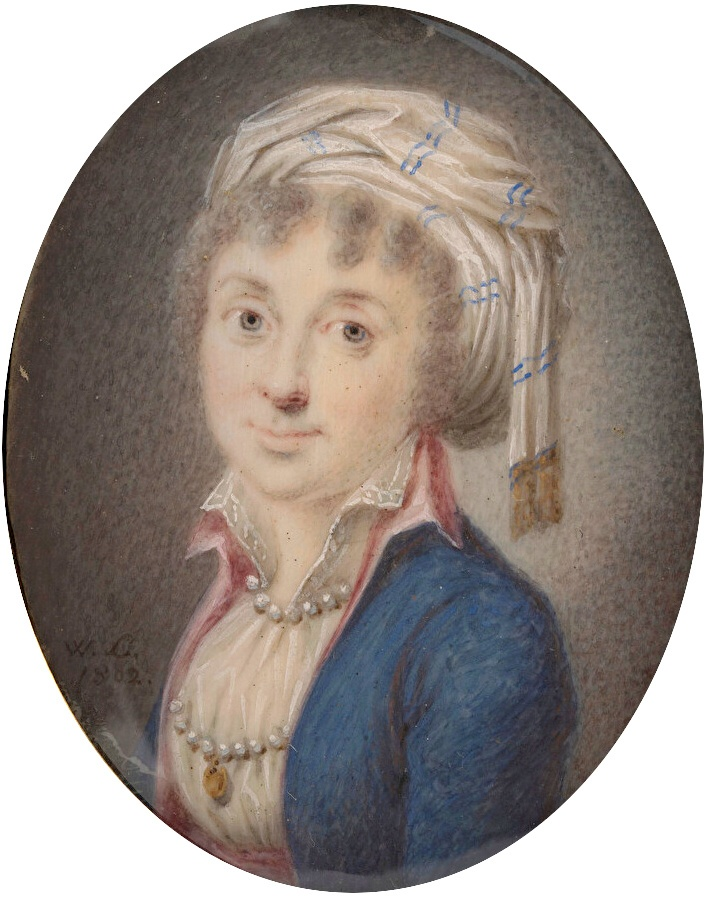
Izabel Czartoryska, by Wincenty de Lesseur 1802.

Since neither Izabela's husband Adam Kazimierz nor former lover Nikolai Repnin initially objected to her liaison with the Duke of Lauzun (Repnin was jealous only of Adrien Louis de Bonnières, Count de Guines, the French ambassador in London, who also admired Izabela at the time), the three of them went "to take waters" in Spa, in what is now Belgium, in the same year 1772. After Repnin's departure, the princess declared her love for the duke on her way from Spa to Brussels. In Paris on 5 November 1773, the lovers had an intimate encounter. The next day, torn by remorse, Czartoryska attempted to poison herself, but was saved. While in Paris with the duke, she experienced moments of increasingly intense passion and finally abandoned Repnin, who returned to Russia. Isabella herself returned to the country in April 1774 and confessed to Lauzun, as she was leaving, that she was in a different state with him. On 28 October 1774, she gave birth to a second son, Konstanty Adam, at the Blue Palace in Warsaw; the boy's real father, whom Isabella said was Armand Louis de Gontaut de Lauzun, was present at the birth, hidden in a wardrobe behind the bed.

The Duke de Lauzun's plans to settle down with Czartoryska ultimately failed. He was recalled to France; the lovers' relationship also began to deteriorate, with Isabella accusing de Lauzun of infidelity and having affairs with other men, including Franciszek Ksawery Branicki; eventually their correspondence was broken off. Duke de Lauzun was executed by guillotine during the French Revolution in 1793. After his death, while Czartoryska was still alive, his memoirs were published in 1821, causing a scandal in both Poland and France. In his memoirs, de Lauzun detailed his relationships with Izabela, other women of the English and French aristocracy, and women of the "communes". The families who were the victims of these misdeeds demanded that the diaries be recognized as forgeries, and in 1858, at the request of the Czartoryski family, mainly Izabela's son Adam Jerzy, they were confiscated. Their authenticity is now widely accepted by historians.

== Building projects ==
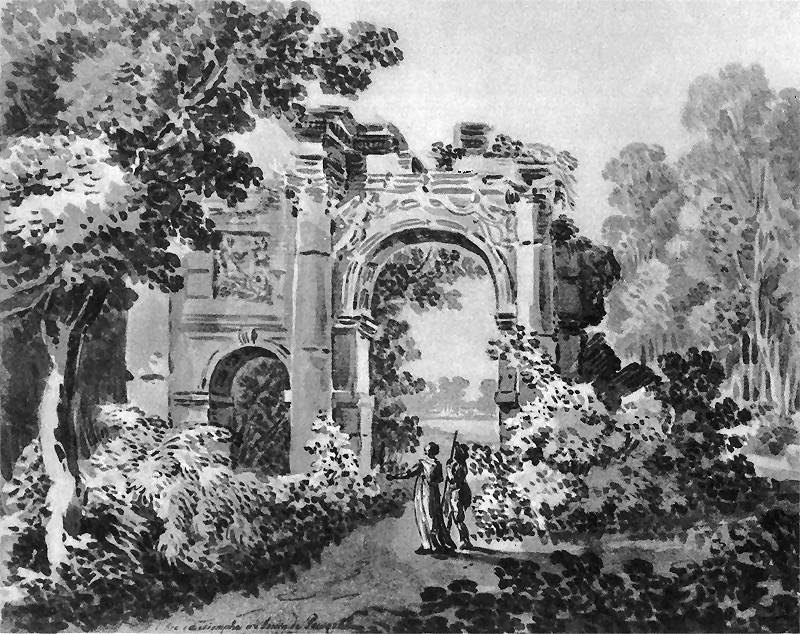
A fragment of the Czartoryski Palace's Powązki Garden with the ruins of the triumphal arch. Circa 1800.

Although the Czartoryskis' main residence in Warsaw was the Blue Palace, the Princess spent much time at her summer residence in Powązki, a village five kilometres from Warsaw at the time. When the Duchy leased Powązki in 1771, Izabela decided to create an atmospheric landscape park in the area that would rival her sister-in-law Izabela Lubomirska's Mokotów (Mon Coteau) and her friend Helena Radziwiłłowa's Arkadia.

The Swiss mathematician Johann Bernoulli, who visited Poland and the Czartoryski family in 1778, described the residence as follows:

Powązki looks like a small village hidden in the middle of a forest, surrounded by lakes and streams. Apart from a few artificial ruins, there are only simple wooden cottages with thatched roofs. However, inside these cottages are decorated with incredible elegance and luxury.

The visitors to Powązki were most impressed by Princess Izabela's cottage and its luxurious bathroom on the ground floor. As Bernoulli wrote:

In the last room on the upper floor there is a hidden recess from which a special device leads down to the ground floor. This room is a bathroom. But what a bathroom! The bathtub is hidden in a recess under a sofa upholstered in precious gold, and the walls are lined with genuine porcelain tiles, magnificently painted and with gold borders. I counted about six hundred of these tiles, and one tile, believe it or not, cost a ducat.

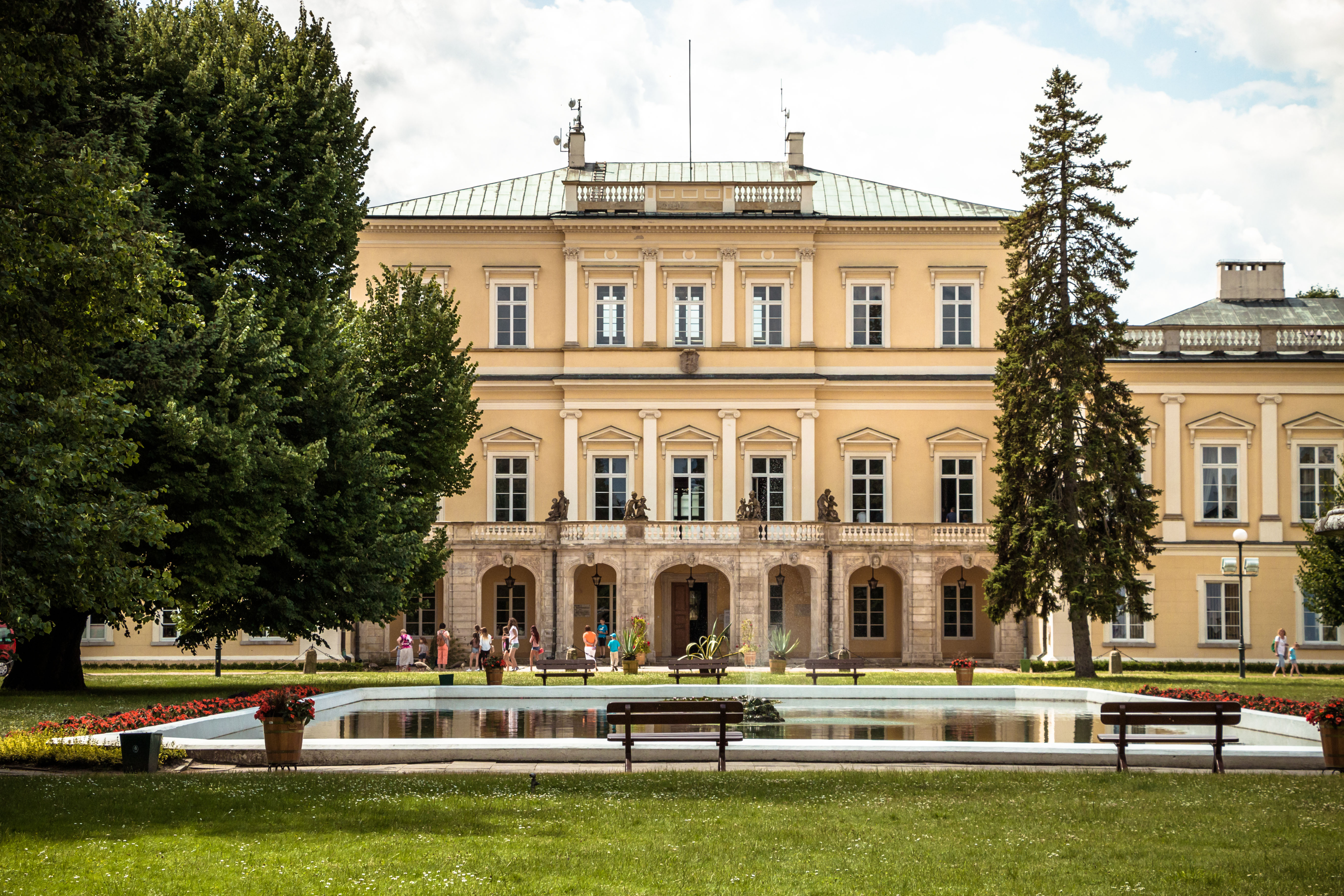
Czartoryski Palace at Puławy

In 1775, together with her husband, Czartoryska completely transformed the Czartoryski Palace at Puławy into an intellectual and political meeting place. Her court was one of the most liberal and progressive in the Commonwealth, although some aspects of her behavior also caused scandals. Izabela discovered the talent of the young painter Aleksander Orłowski and financed him.

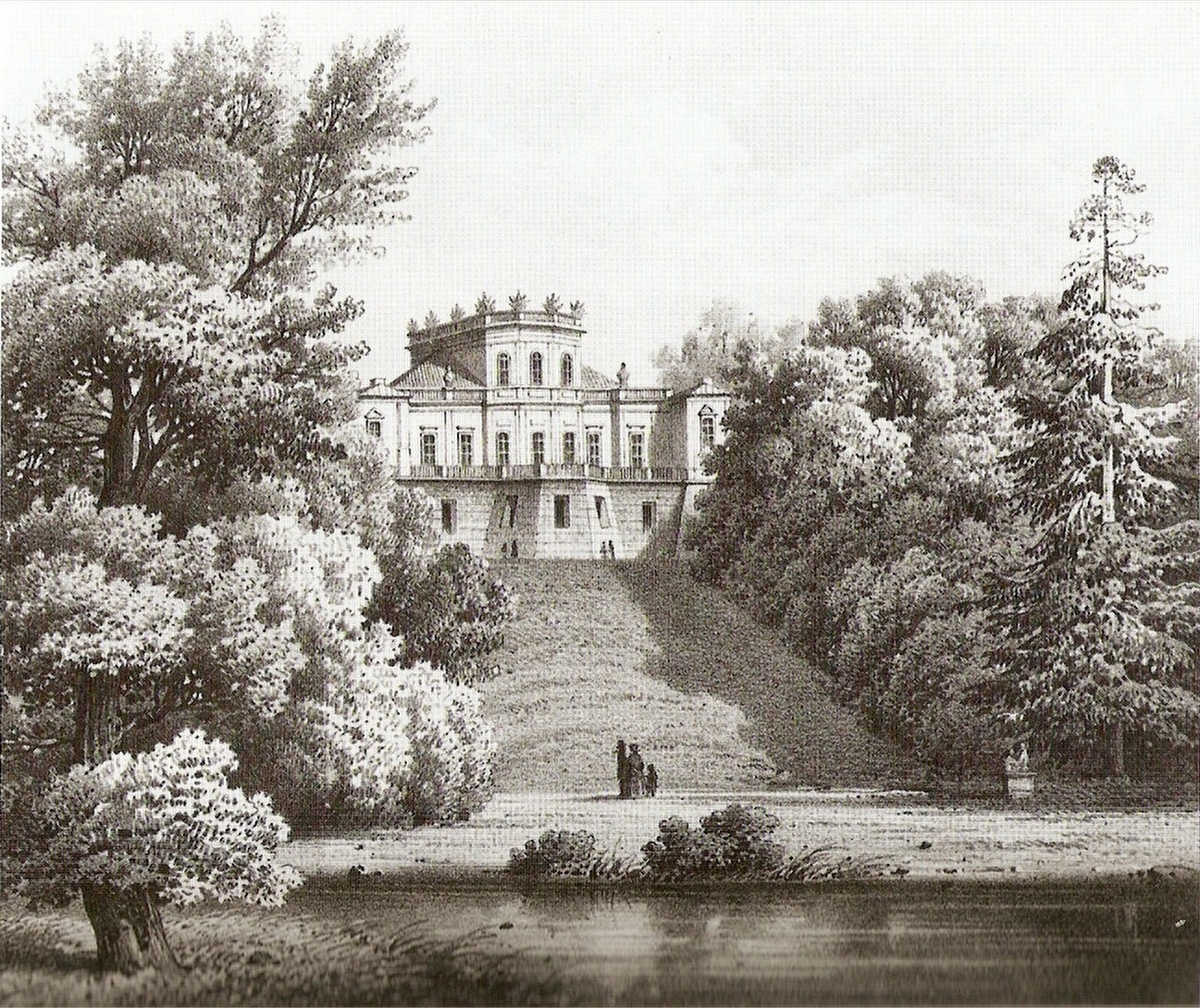
Czartoryski Palace seen from River Vistula, by A. Leroix early 19th century.

While in Prussia with her daughter Maria Wirtemberska for the latter's marriage with Duke Louis of Württemberg, 28 October 1784 in Siedlce, she visited Frederick II at his Potsdam residence at Sanssouci and told him of her fears that her husband would be poisoned, which was what had caused a split between him and Stanisław August Poniatowski politically. Frederick laughed and told her that only monarchs were poisoned, and spread the conversation around his court to Izabela's detriment, according to Wirydianna Fiszerowa. In 1784, she joined the Patriotic Party.

In 1790, Isabella began construction of the Marynka Palace in Puławy, where her daughter Maria and son-in-law Louis would reside. Designed by the Puławy architect Christian Piotr Aigner and preserved in the classicist style, the building has survived to this day within the park and palace complex and forms one of its most valuable parts. The Latin inscription on the portico frieze reads "Iste terrarum mihi praeter omnes angulus ridet" ("Of all the corners of the earth, this one smiles upon me most"), intended to attest to the deep bond between Maria, Puławy, and her family. Construction progressed rapidly; by 1792, the floors had been installed and the metalwork was underway. However, the couple never lived in the palace, which later served mainly as a guest house for the Czartoryski family.

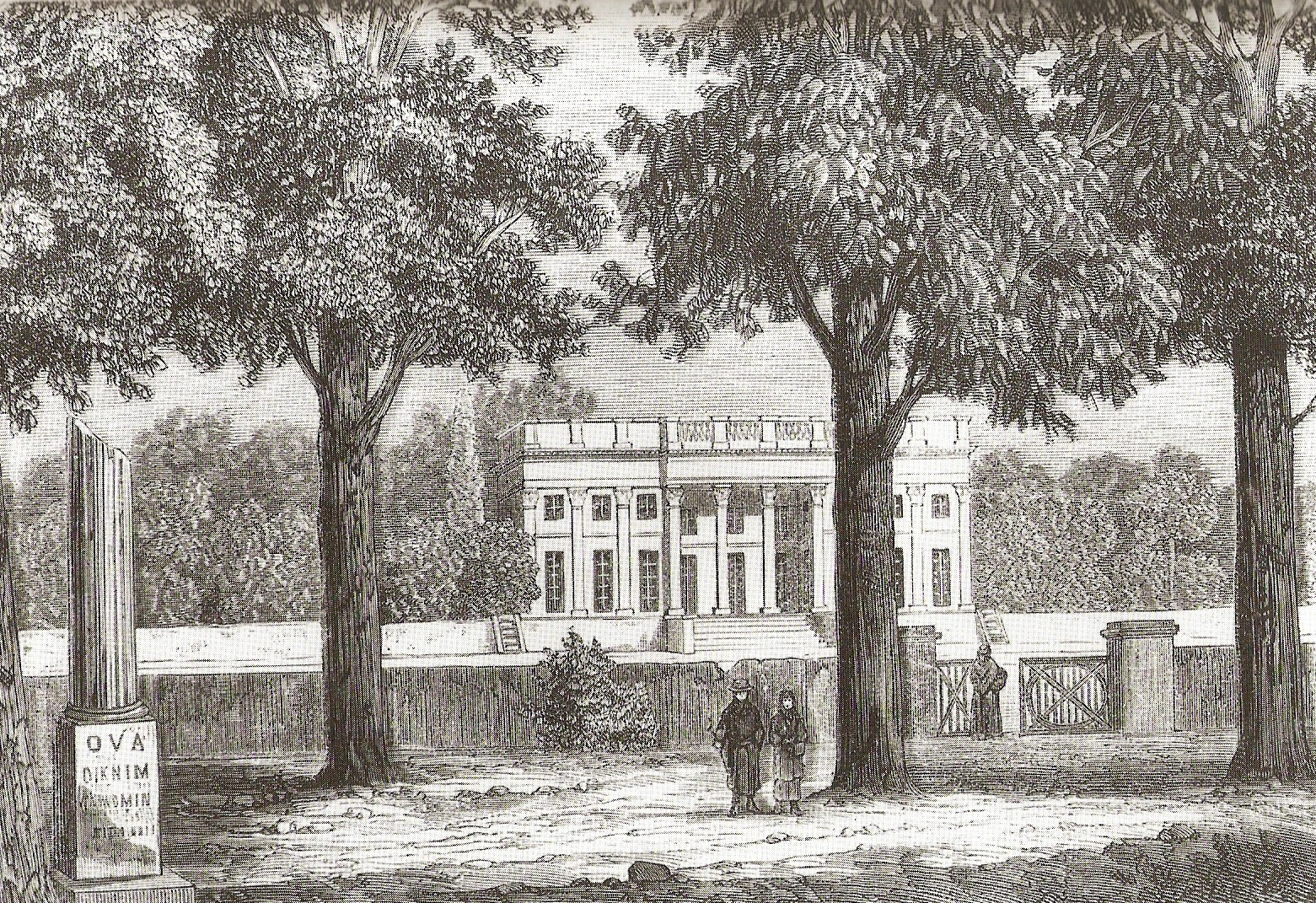
Marynka Palace in Puławy, 1791–1796, in 1850's.

== Politics and theatre ==
At the turn of 1784/1785 the Czartoryski family fell victim to the so-called Dogrum affair. The perpetrator of the scandal was a certain Maria Teresa d'Ugrumoff, who was commonly known as Dogrumowa. Knowing of the antagonism between the king and the Czartoryski family, she decided to provoke an open confrontation between them. First, she told the king in an audience that she knew of an assassination plot in which Adam Kazimierz Czartoryski was allegedly involved. The king did not believe the accusation and dismissed her empty-handed, she went to Prince Adam and told him that the king was planning an assassination attempt against him, to be carried out by the royal butler Franciszek Ryx and General Jan Komarzewski. Adam Czartoryski believed the accusation; it led to the imprisonment of Ryx and Komarzewski, who in turn filed a defamation lawsuit against Czartoryski's supporters. The case caused a huge uproar in Warsaw at the time, with the population divided between supporters of Prince Adam and those convinced that the accusations were false and that the alleged assassination was Dogrum's invention. The trial, which ended in April 1785, decided in favor of the latter – Dogrum was sentenced to life imprisonment in the Gdańsk Fortress for defamation (he was released after the Second Partition of Germany and the Prussian occupation of Gdańsk), and the alleged assassins were acquitted of the charges. The king's nephew Stanisław Poniatowski later assumed in his memoirs that the Russian ambassador to Warsaw, Otto Magnus von Stackelberg, was actually behind Dogrum's actions and intended to eventually divide the king and the family.

The Dogrum affair and the lost lawsuit, which cost Prince Adam almost 4 million zlotys, further deepened the Czartoryski family's resentment towards the king. Izabela Lubomirska, Adam Czartoryski's sister, who had been on his side during the affair, left the country and never returned, while the Czartoryski family and their entire court moved to Puławy.

The Dogrum affair also left a lasting impression on Princess Izabela, as it initiated a gradual transformation of her character from a woman primarily interested in entertainment to a patriot who considered herself devoted to her homeland. Having shown little interest in politics in her youth, she now decided to work actively alongside her husband and gather the anti-royal opposition in Puławy. In the summer of 1786, Adam Kazimierz traveled to Volhynia, Podolia, and Ukraine, ostensibly to inspect the estates he had inherited from his father Augustus, but the real reason may have been a desire to establish contacts with the leaders of the anti-royal camp – Stanisław Szczęsny Potocki and Franciszek Ksawery Branicki. Landowners from all over the country also began to arrive in Puławy to discuss matters with the duchy before the upcoming parliamentary session, which would go down in history as the quadrennial sejm.

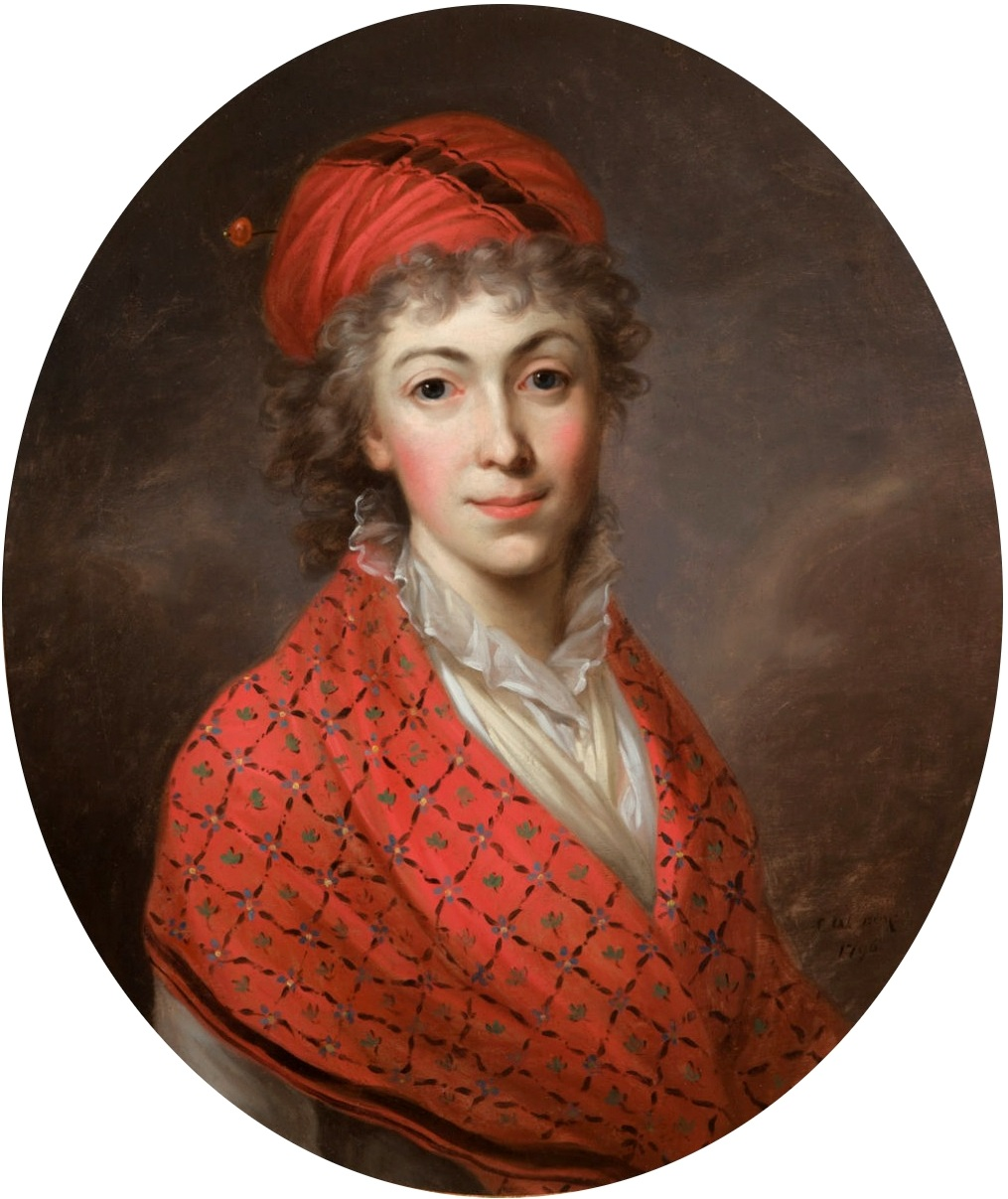
Izabela Czartoryska in a gypsy costume, by Kazimierz Wojniakowski 1796

In this atmosphere, Izabela Czartoryska decided to stage the opera Matka Spartanka, which Franciszek Kniaźnin had just composed to music by Wincenty Fryderyk Lessel, father of Franciszek Lessel, the court composer of the Czartoryski family, and to sets by Jan Piotr Norblin. The opera was performed in the Great Hall of the Puławy Palace, probably on 15 June 1786. The premiere was attended by such anti-royal magnates as Franciszek Ksawery Branicki, Seweryn Rzewuski, Ignacy Potocki and Stanisław Kostka Potocki, and the audience totalled over 500. Kniaźnin's now forgotten drama caused a similar stir in Puławy and later throughout Poland as the return of the ambassador Julian Ursyn Niemcewicz, which premiered four years later. The plot of the work, based on an episode of the Boeotian War, in which the Thebans led by Epaminondas fought against the Spartans in 371 BC, actually spoke of the need to fight for Polish independence – under the Spartan theatrical costume was Poland, and Thebes symbolized the threatening Russia.

“Mother Spartan” was not the only play Isabella produced. Unlike her husband, who, after writing several comedies (e.g. “The Married Maiden”, “The Actress”, “Coffee”) performed in Warsaw, including on the stage of the cadet regiment, of which he was the commander, in the 1770s, lost interest in playwriting after 1780. The Princess was a passionate lover of the theater and staged plays in which she herself also acted, in the Puławy Palace, in the garden and on the open-air stage of nearby Kępa. Already in the spring of 1787, Kniaźnin's second opera, “The Gypsies”, premiered in Siedlce. The music was composed by Michał Kleofas Ogiński, and the duchess played a gypsy woman named Jawnuta. This time, the play belonged to the genre of comic opera with sentimental elements.

Although the Czartoryskas' primary residence from 1783 was Puławy — her husband, however, preferred Sieniawa, their second residence — she continued to travel extensively both in Poland and abroad and to take an active part in political life. In 1787, the duchy met Emperor Joseph II on their estates in Galicia — from 1781 Adam Kazimierz also served as commander of the Galician Noble Guard, the Nobel Guard, at the court of Vienna — and in September of the same year Izabela traveled to Paris. There she met, among others, Queen Marie Antoinette, to whom she delivered a letter from her brother, Emperor Joseph, and her former love, the Armand Louis de Gontaut de Lauzun, for the last time.

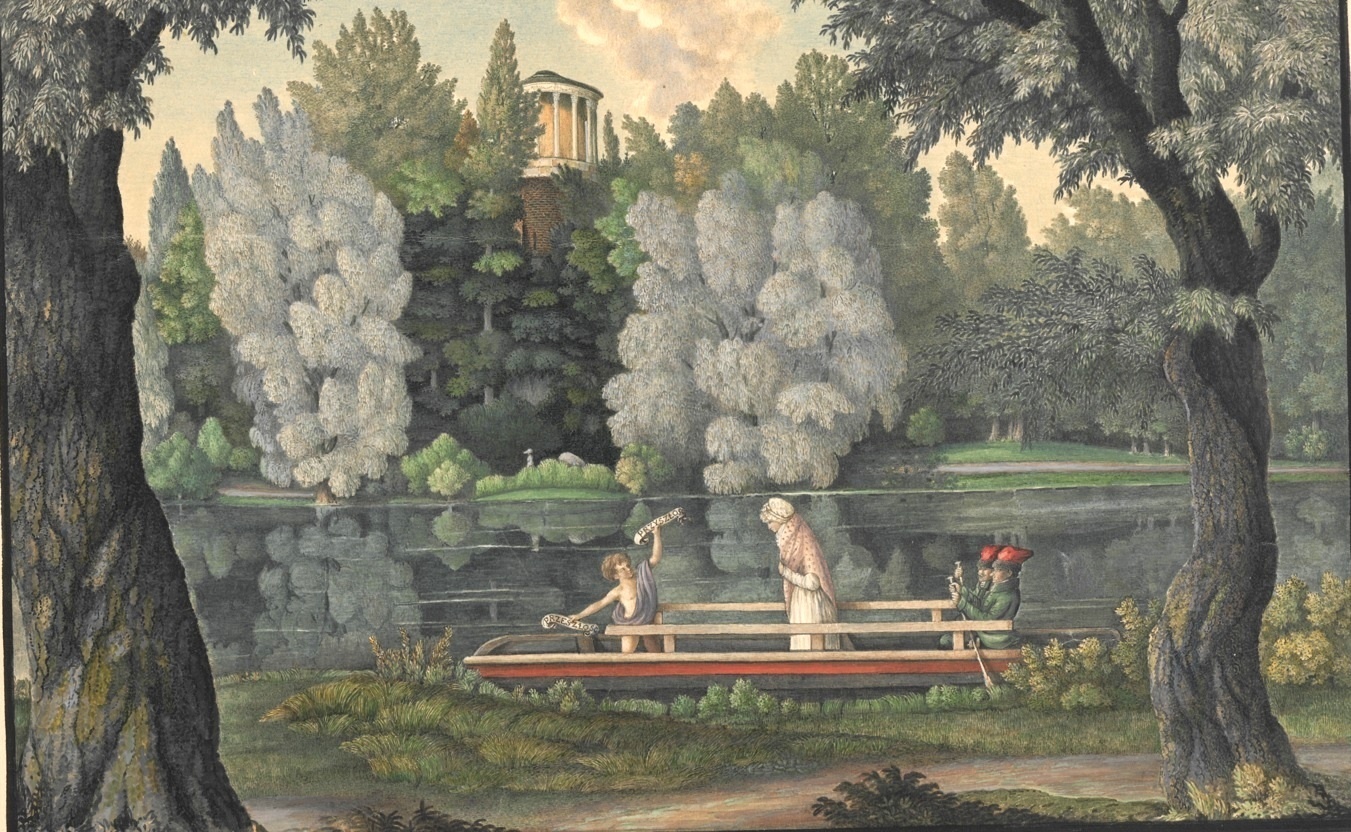
Izabela Czartoryska and veterans of the Kościuszko Uprising with Genius sailing by boat on the Łasze River at the foot of the Temple of the Sybil, by W. Milkiewicz.

When she returned to Poland in the summer of 1788, preparations for the Sejm were just beginning. The Sejm went down in history as a Four-year Sejm. When Prince Adam Kazimierz was elected representative of the Lublin Voivodeship, Izabela followed him to Warsaw. Czartoryski's Blue Palace in Warsaw became one of the most important centers of political life in the Sejm; every Wednesday the duchy held receptions there, which provided an opportunity for important meetings and lively discussions. It was probably in the Blue Palace that the first draft of the Constitution of May 3 1791 was developed. Puławy, located only 20 hours' drive from the capital, did not lose its important role either.

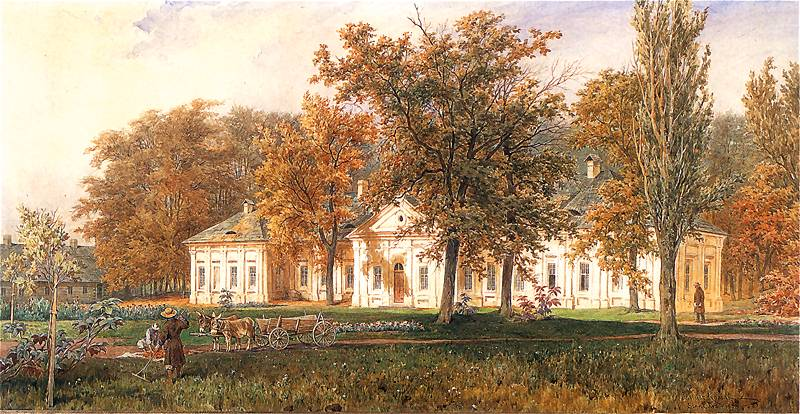
Palace Czartoryski in Sieniawa, by Juliusz Kossak 1873.

In the autumn of 1792, Izabela Czartoryska moved to her second residence in Sieniawa in Austrian Galicia, where she also offered shelter to Tadeusz Kościuszko. Kościuszko, one of the commanders of the war that had just ended, was already becoming a Polish national hero; for his actions in defending independence, he also earned the respect of the Czartoryski family.

After the suppression of the Kościuszko Uprising in 1794, her sons Adam George and Konstanty Adam were taken as political hostages by Russia's Empress Catherine II.

As Emperor Alexander I's uncle, Duke Louis von Württemberg was married to Izabela's daughter Maria Anna, their estates were saved in 1812 after the Duchy of Warzawa ceased its after the defeat of Napoleon in 1813. Russia occupied the Duchy, which led to semi-autonomous polity of Congress Poland in 1815.

== Patroness of the Arts ==
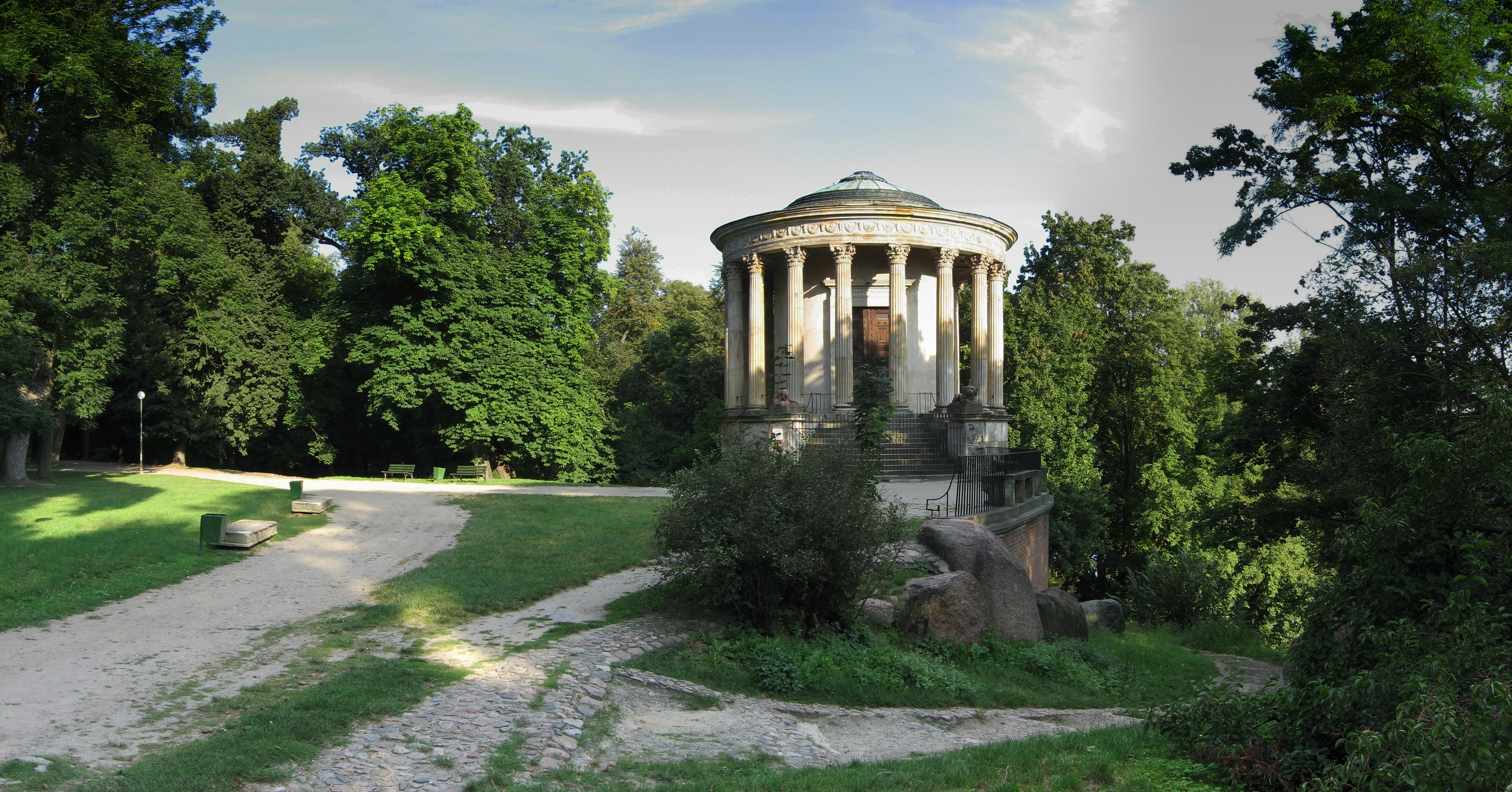
Temple of the Sibyl, Izabela Czartoryska's museum at Puławy

Izabela Czartoryska became interested in collecting in the 1780s. She got her first pieces during a long journey to Switzerland, England and Scotland between 1789 and 1791.

In 1796 after the second partition of Poland, Princess Izabela ordered the rebuilding of the Russian troops in 1794 ruined palace at Puławy and began a museum. She hired numerous artists, builders and landscape architects who, under her leadership, rebuilt the palace and park, the work was supervised by architect Joachim Hempel. In 1788, construction began on the Doric orangery, known as the Greek House (now the location of the Puławy City Library), and later, in 1791, construction began on the Marynka Palace, intended for her daughter Maria Anna. Czartoryska's goal was for her Puławy, known as the "Polish Athens", to rival the royal court. The development of the cultural and intellectual life of the Czartoryska court was promoted by writers, painters and activists of the Enlightenment, who participated, among other things, in the education of the ducal children. Among them were Gotfryd Ernest Groddeck (later professor at Vilnius University, later teacher of Adam Mickiewicz), Grzegorz Piramowicz (parish priest in nearby Kurów and Końskowola), Julian Ursyn Niemcewicz, Jan Paweł Woronicz, Franciszek Dionizy Kniaźotr. Thanks to the care of the Czartoryski family, the son of a carpenter from Puławy, the architect Chrystian Piotr Aigner, also received an education and began his career.

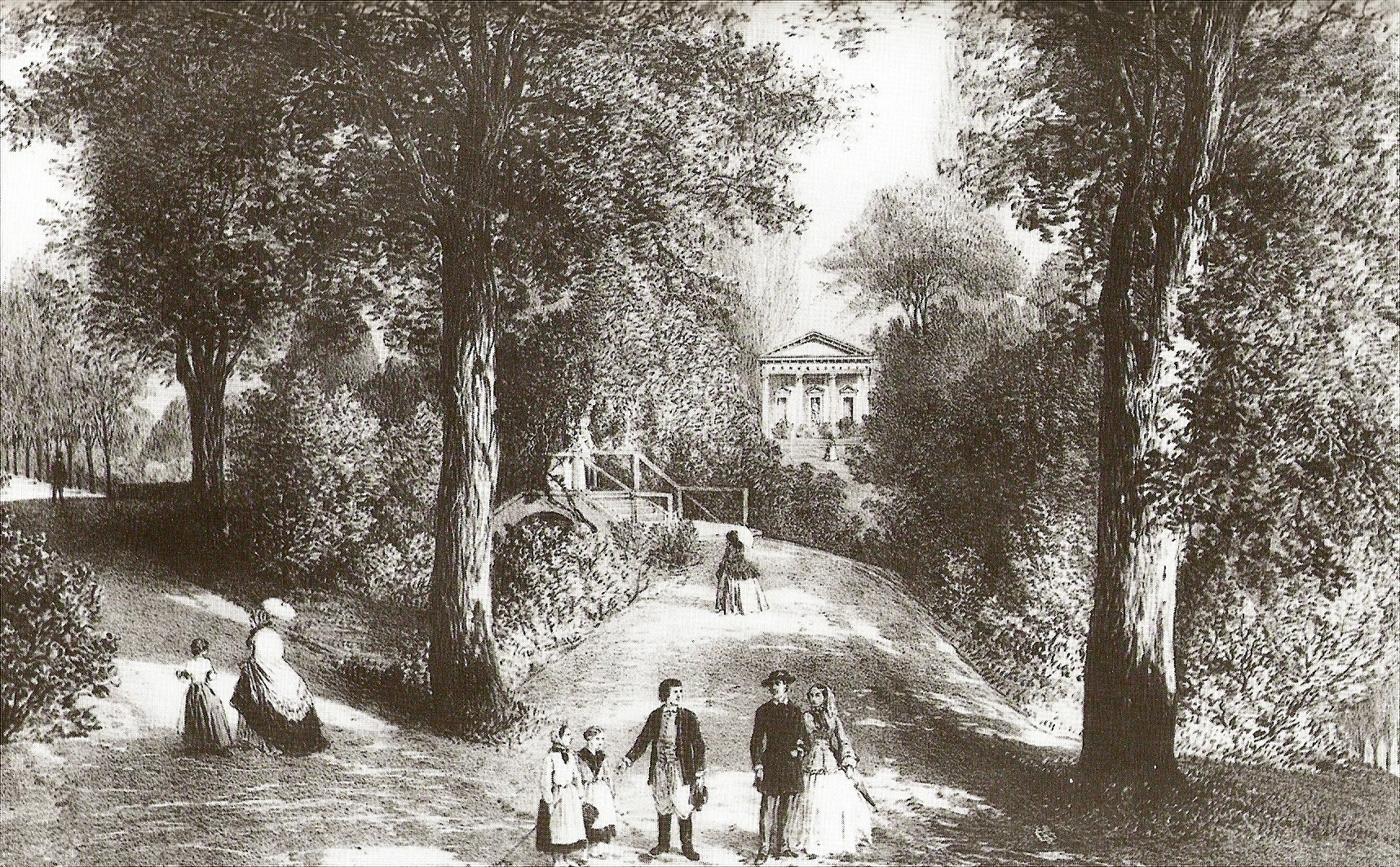
Greek House from 1788 and the bridge in the park in Puławy, in 1850's.

Among the first objects to be included in the museum were Turkish trophies that had been seized by Polish King John III Sobieski's forces at the 1683 Battle of Vienna. Also included were Polish royal treasures and historic Polish family heirlooms. In 1801 Princess Izabela opened the Temple of the Sibyl, also called "The Temple of Memory". It contained objects of sentimental importance pertaining to the glories and miseries of human life. During the November Uprising in 1830, the museum was closed. Son Adam George Czartoryski, going into exile in Paris, evacuated the museum's surviving objects to the Hôtel Lambert. His son Władysław Czartoryski would re-open the museum in 1878 in Kraków, where it exists today.

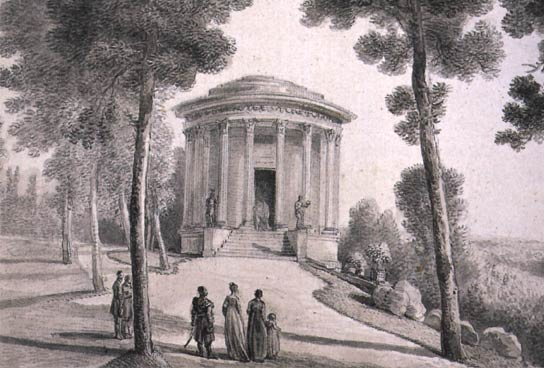
Temple of the Sibyl, from 1801, in early 19th century.

Paintings and works of art that Princess Izabela did not associate with historical figures, came to the museum for their artistic merit. The gallery of paintings at the Gothic House was mostly acquired by her sons, Adam Jerzy and Konstanty. The Gothic House housed, among others, three of the most valuable paintings ever in Polish museum collections: Leonardo da Vinci's Lady with an Ermine, Rembrandt's Landscape with the Good Samaritan, both currently in the Czartoryski Museum in Kraków, and Raphael's Portrait of a Young Man (lost in World War II). Lady with an Ermine as well as the Portrait of a Young Man, were purchased in Italy for Princess Izabela by her son Adam Jerzy. Izabela was unaware of the painting's history or the true identity of the painter, and identified him with Madame Féron, known as "La Belle Ferronière", the mistress of King Francis I of France, so the painting can be classified as a souvenir of Francis I, albeit with incorrect attribution.

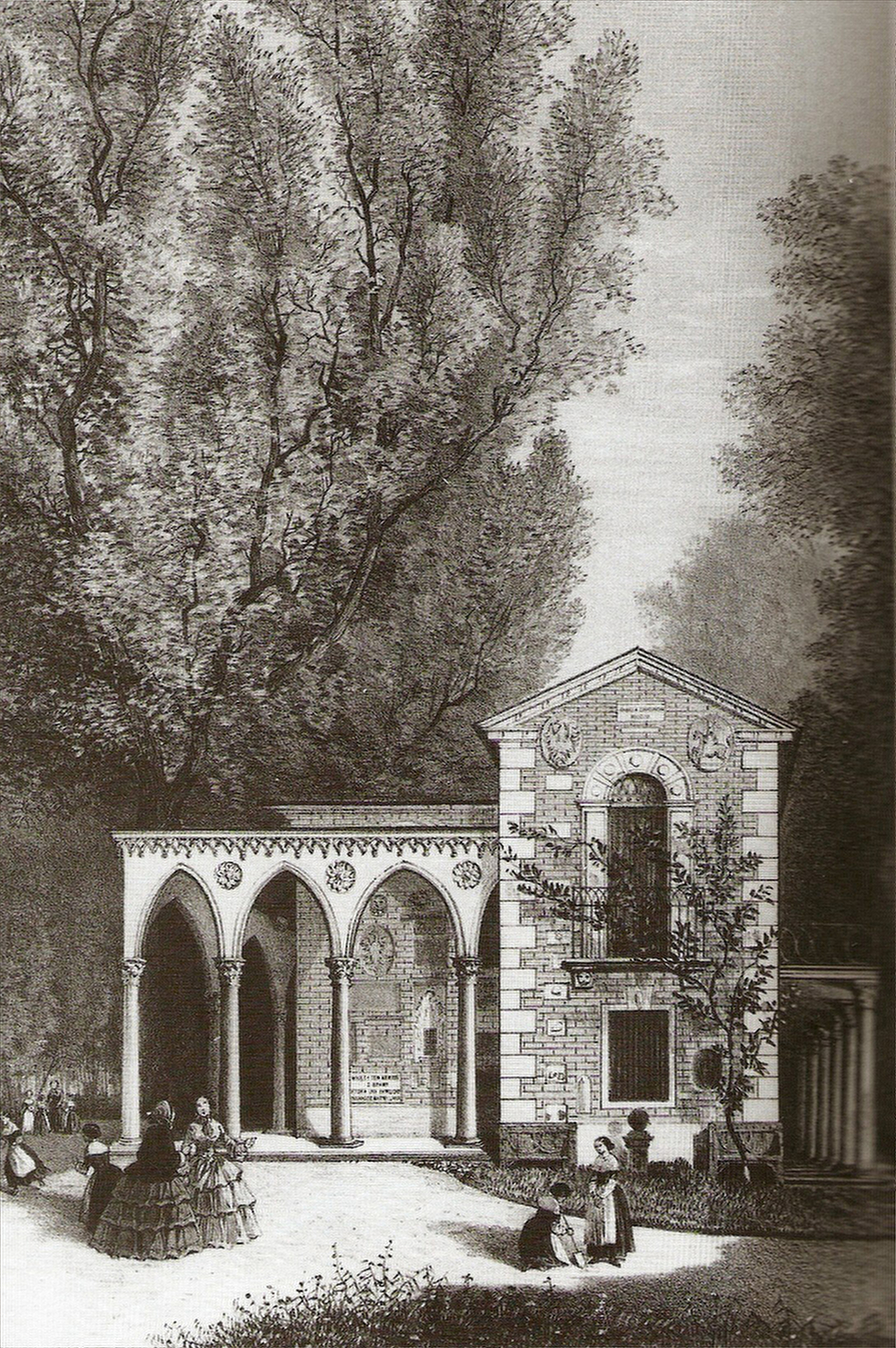
Gothic House in Puławy, 1801–1809, architect Christian Piotr Aigner. Engrawing by A. Cassagne on the basis of a drawing by Barbara Czernof, 1850's.

Princess Izabela personally supervised all these collections, collecting, processing and cataloguing them until she left Puławy in 1831. Particularly noteworthy is her monumental, handwritten and illustrated catalogue of the mementos kept in the Gothic House in Puławy, divided into three parts and containing detailed descriptions of all the mementos. Based on this catalogue, the first Polish printed museum catalogue was published in Warsaw in 1828: "Poczet mementątek przedmieskach w Dom Gothicm w Puławyach", edited by Izabela Czartoryska, and is the main source of information about the collections in the Gothic House.

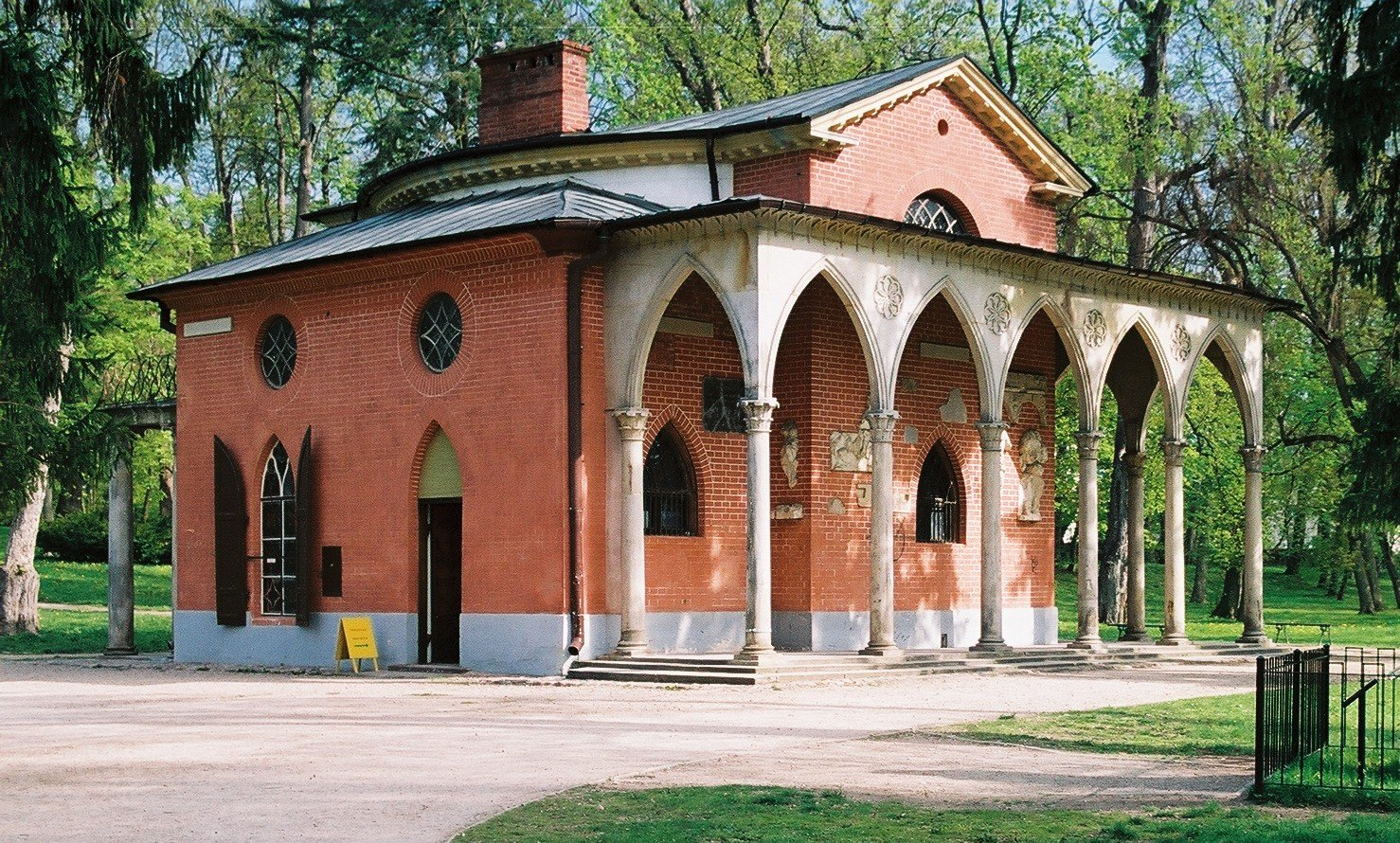
Gothic House in 2005.

Before leaving Puławy, Izabela Czartoryska managed to hide the museum collections of the Sibyl Temple and the Gothic House, as well as part of the book collection of the Puławy library and family archive. These collections were buried in the dungeons, cellars and caves of the Sibyl Temple, in the Church of St. Joseph in Włostowice and the Reformed Monastery in Kazimierz Dolny, and were also hidden by a friendly family throughout Poland. After the collapse of the November Uprising in 1831, they were smuggled across the Austrian border, and most of the books and archives ended up in Sieniawa, while the museum collections of the Sibyl Temple and the Gothic House ended up in Krasiczyn; thanks to this, most of the collection was preserved. From the 1840s to the 1860s, Izabela Czartoryska's collections were gradually transported to Paris, to Adam Jerzy Czartoryski's apartment, the Hôtel Lambert. In the 1870s, Adam Jerzy's son, Władysław Czartoryski, decided to move them to Kraków, and eventually the Czartoryski Museum of the Princes of Kraków was opened to the public on 1 December 1876.

After the November Uprising 1831, the property was confiscated by Russia and Izabela settled in Wysocko in Galicia with her daughter Maria Anna.

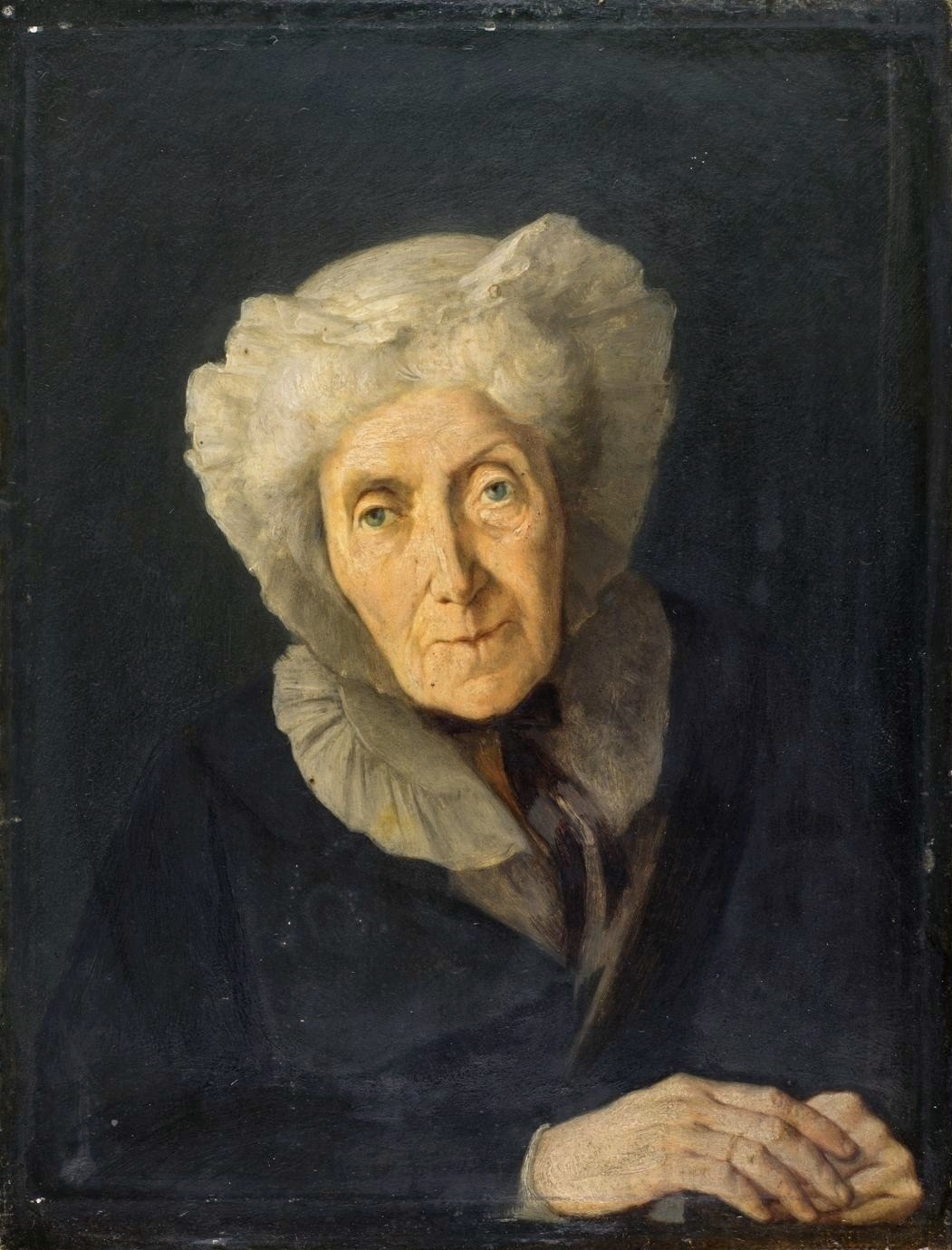
Izabela Czartoryska, by Wojciech Korneli Stattler 1835.

Izabela Czartoryska died in Wysocko on 19 June 1835 at the age of 90. Her husband had died three years previously at the age of 88. She was initially buried in Moszczany, and in 1860 the coffin with her body was moved to the Czartoryski family grave in Sieniawa.

The town of Izabelin, founded by her father Georg Detlev von Flemming, was named after her.

== Works ==
=== Published ===
- Myśli różne o sposobie zakładania ogrodów (Various Thoughts on the Method of Laying Gardens, 1805)
- A prayer book for village children during Holy Mass, written for the Puławy school (1815)
- Pielgrzym w Dobromilu, czyli nauki wiejskie (The Pilgrim in Dobromil, or Rural Sciences with a Novel and 40 Pictures, 1819)
- The Pilgrim in Dobromil, Part Two, or a Continuation of the Rural Teachings with Ten Pictures and Music (1821)
- By Stagecoach Through Silesia: Journal of a Journey to Cieplice in 1816 (published 1968)
- The Sybil Catalogue (1827)
- List of memorabilia preserved in the Gothic House in Puławy (1828)
- Correspondence of Princess Izabella Czartoryska with the poet Delille (published in 1887)
- Letters from Countess Fleming, Princess Izabella Czartoryska to her elder son Prince Adam (published 1887)
- Correspondance inédite D'Isabelle Czartoryska avec JC Lavater (ed. 1970)

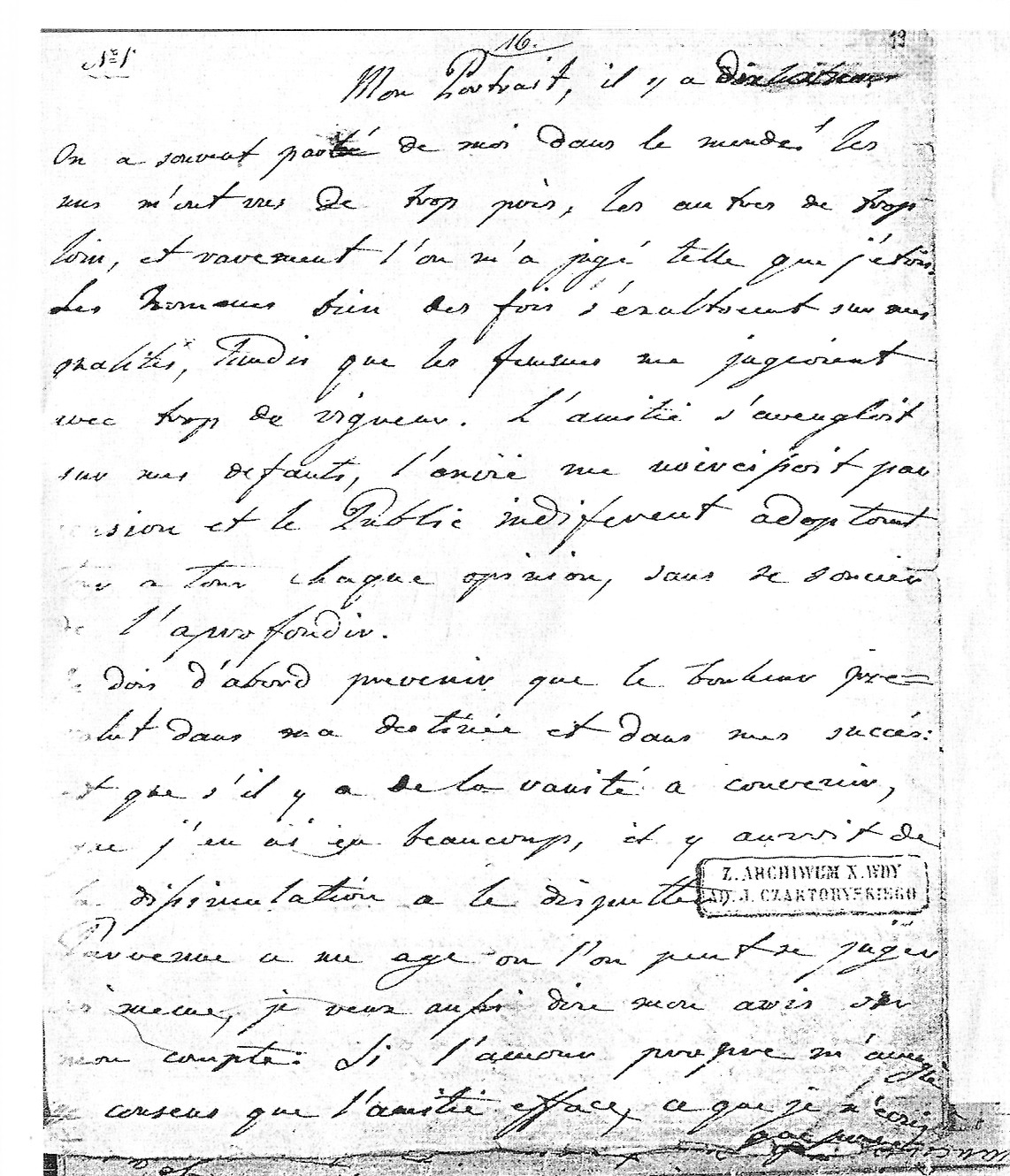
"Mon portrait, il y a dix ans", manuscript by Princess Izabela Czartoryska.

=== Selection of unpublished works ===
- Mon portrait, il ya dix ans (diaries)
- Mémoires et écrit divers (diaries)
- Tour through England
- Catalog of memorabilia deposited at the Gothic House in Puławy
- Aventure bizarre mais vrai arrivée à Puławy (fantastic and sentimental story)
- Poems: The Willow and the Weeping Birch, To the Polish Army, Let's Look at Nature and others

== See also ==
- Czartoryski Museum
- Royal Casket
- "Mold of the Earth"
