= Georg Detlev von Flemming =

German military officer and politician in Poland–Lithuania

Jacob Heinrich von Flemming
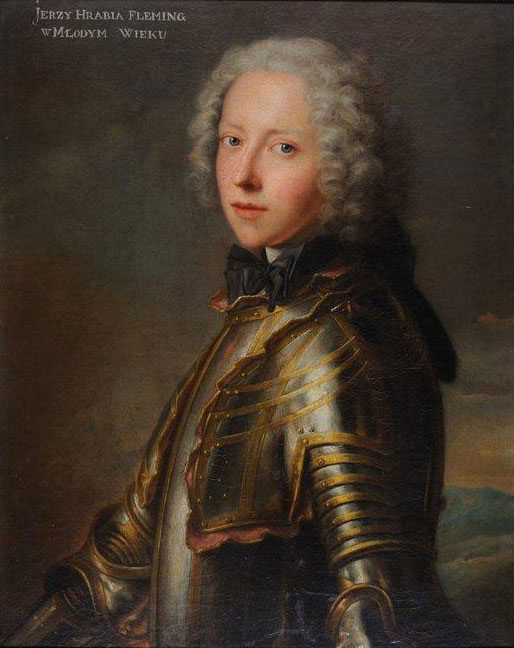
- Anonymous portrait, 18th century
- Born: March 3, 1699; Iven
- Died: December 10, 1771 (aged 72) Warsaw
- Buried: Holy Cross Church, Warsaw

Georg Detlev von Flemming (Polish: Jerzy Detloff Fleming, 3 March 1699 – 10 December 1771) was a General in Polish-Saxon service, Grand Treasurer of Lithuania in 1746–1764 and Voivode of Gdańsk Pomerania in 1766–1771.

== Early life ==
Von Flemming was born on 3 March 1699 in Iven, a town in Swedish Pomerania, then part of the Holy Roman Empire. His family was a renowned magnate family from Pomerania, with long traditions of military service. His father was a Prussian privy councillor, Count Felix Friedrich von Flemming (1661–1739).

== Career ==
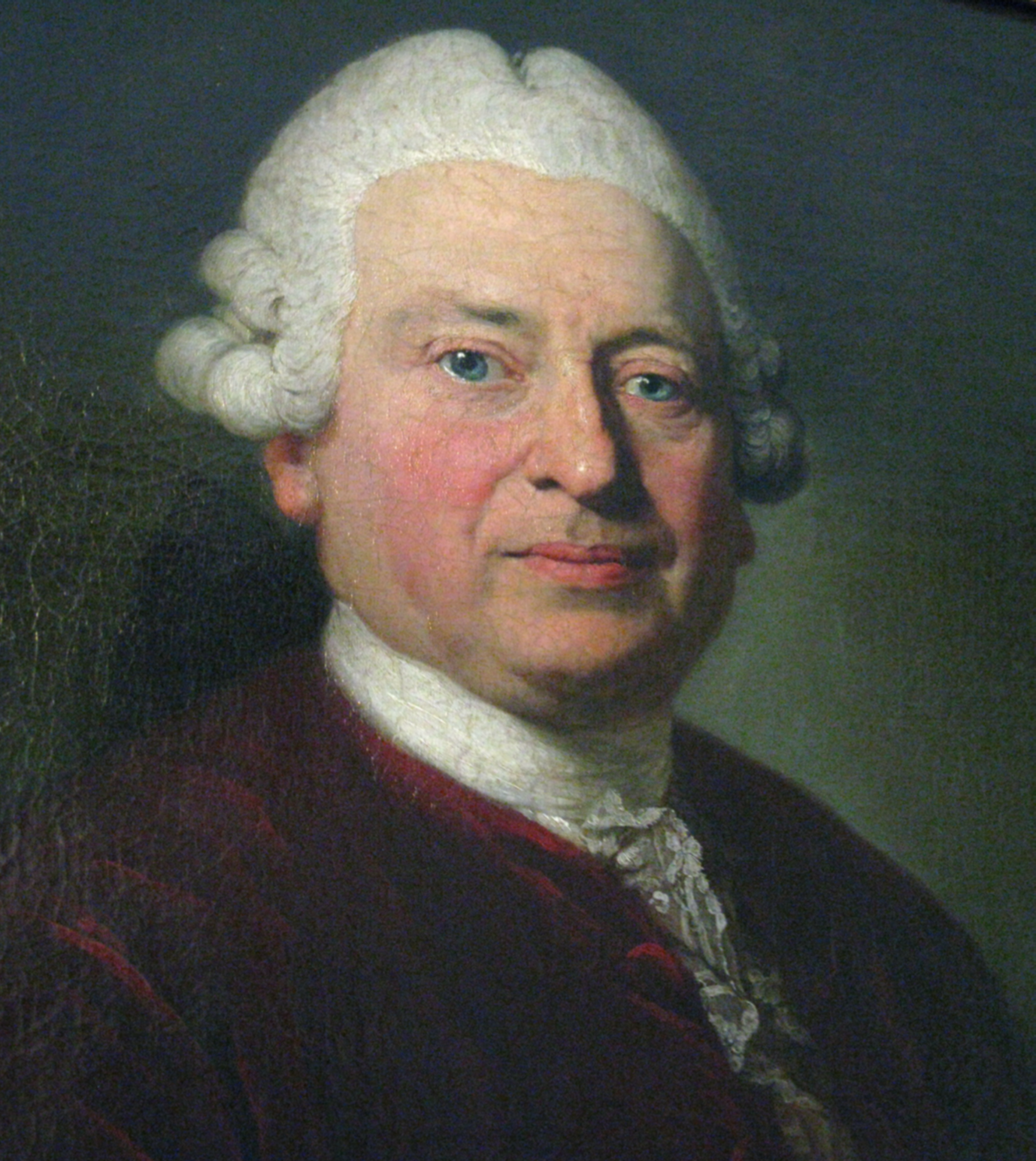
Portrait of Flemming by Anton Graff, c. 1770

Flemming started his military career in the service of Augustus II the Strong and the Crown Army, just as his brother Carl Georg Friedrich von Flemming, a later general himself, who married a Princess Lubomirska. Since 1724 he commanded the Warsaw-based Queen's Own Regiment. A political ally of the Czartoryski family at the royal court, he married twice, to the two daughters of Royal Chancellor Michał Fryderyk Czartoryski (the second wife being Antonina Czartoryska). He founded the town of Izabelin, named after his daughter Izabela Fleming. Izabela married another renowned politician and statesman Adam Kazimierz Czartoryski.

His alliance with the Czartoryskis sped up his career. In 1738 he was promoted to the rank of General in the artillery and on 3 August 1744 he received the Order of the White Eagle. In 1762 he backed the Czartoryskis in their struggle against the Prime Minister Heinrich von Brühl. He also actively opposed the influence of another magnate family, the Radziwiłłs. He died on 10 December 1771 in Warsaw, Poland, and was buried in the Holy Cross Church in Warsaw.
