= Wysocko, Podkarpackie Voivodeship =

Wysocko
- Village
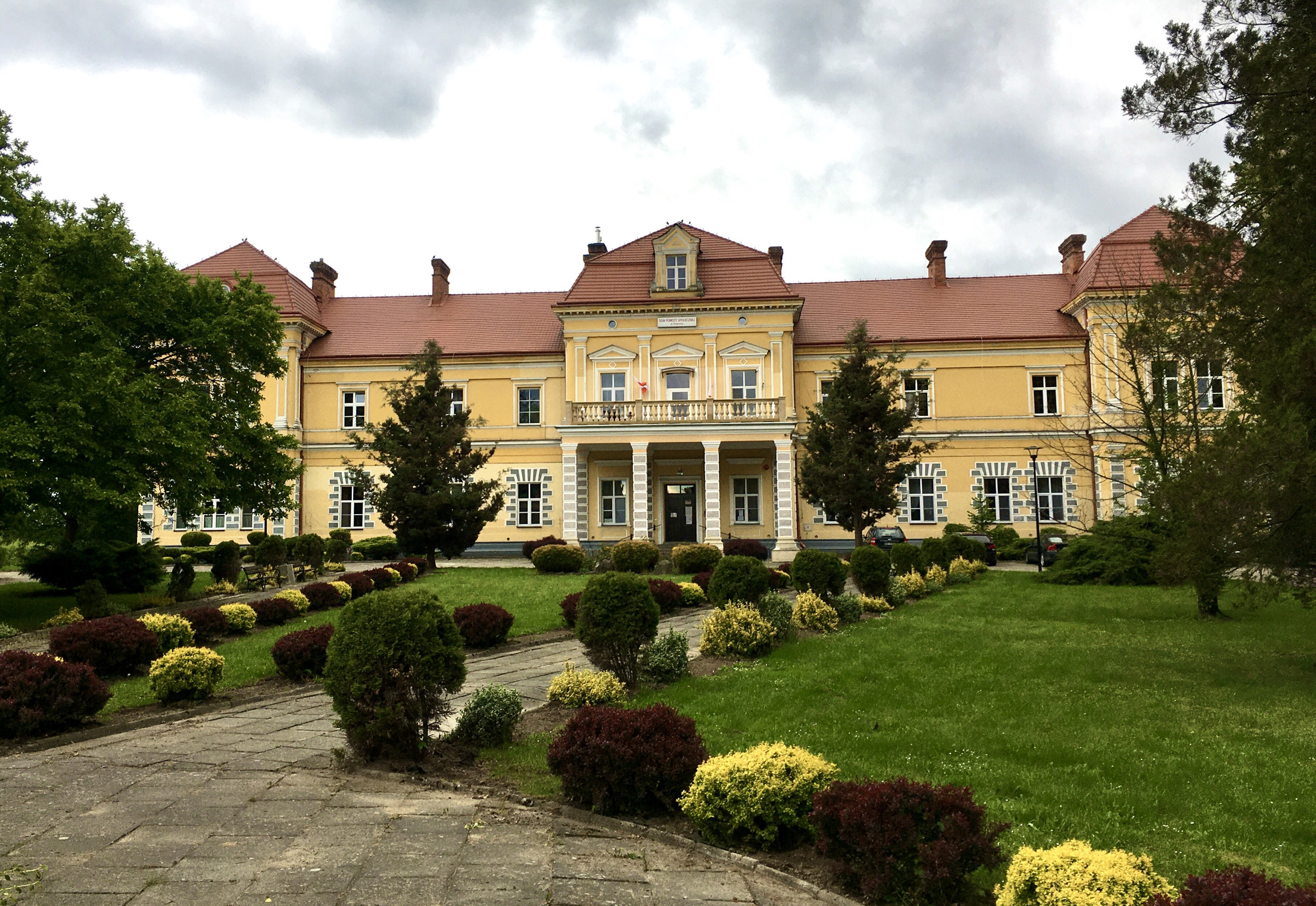

- Location within Poland
- Coordinates: 49°59′25″N 22°49′31″E
- Country: Poland
- Voivodeship: Subcarpathian
- County: Jarosław
- Gmina: Laszki
- Population: 569

Wysocko [vɨˈsɔt͡skɔ] is a village in the administrative district of Gmina Laszki, within Jarosław County, Subcarpathian Voivodeship, in south-eastern Poland.
