= Franciszek Lessel =

Polish composer (1780–1838)

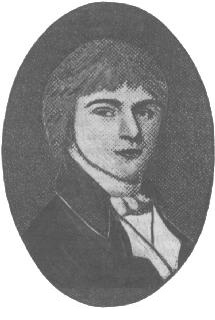

Franciszek Lessel (1780 – 26 December 1838) was a Polish composer.

== Life ==
Lessel was born in Puławy, Poland. His father, Wincenty Ferdynand Lessel, was a pianist and composer of Czech origin who served as his first teacher.

In 1799 Franciszek Lessel went to study with Joseph Haydn and continued to do so until Haydn's death.

Lessel worked as a court musician, headed Warsaw's Amateur Music Society, and gave lessons on how to play the glass harmonica. In later life he largely had non-musical administrative and inspector jobs. He died in Piotrków Trybunalski.

His Grand Trio for Clarinet, Horn, and Piano, Op. 4 (1806) is notable for its contribution to this ensemble instrumentation. Among his most noted pieces is his Fantaisie in E minor, Op.13, which was dedicated to Cecylia Beydale. Beydale and Lessel wanted to marry but the difference in their social standing and Lessel’s financial troubles made that impossible.

His piano concerto in C major (opus 14, published c.1814) has been recorded twice, once on Harmonia Mundi France in 1993 and more recently on a disc released in 2011.
