= Adam Kazimierz Czartoryski =

Polish noble, writer, literary critic (1734–1823)

Prince Adam Kazimierz Czartoryski
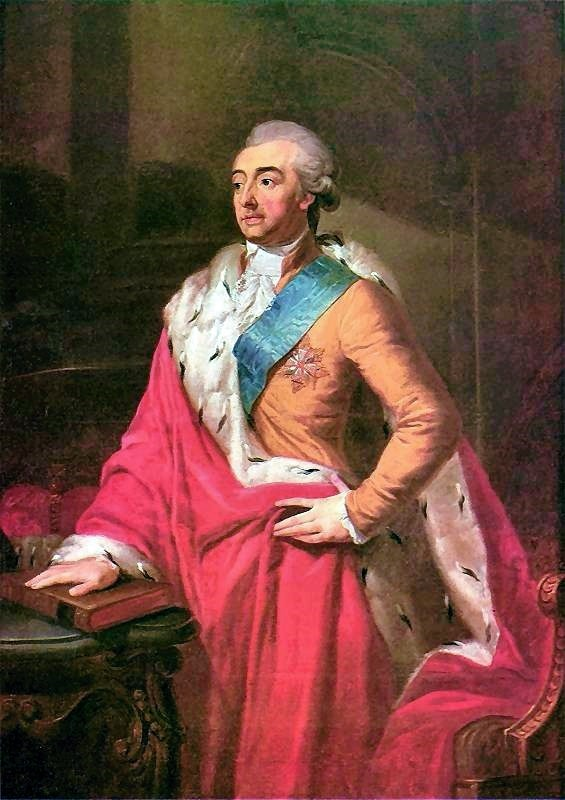
- Official portrait by Józef Peszka, 1791
- Born: 1 December 1734; Gdańsk (Danzig), Polish-Lithuanian Commonwealth
- Died: 19 March 1823 (aged 88); Sieniawa, Austrian Empire
- Noble family: Czartoryski
- Spouse: Izabella Czartoryska née Fleming
- Issue: Teresa Czartoryska; Maria Anna Czartoryska; Adam Jerzy Czartoryski; Konstanty Adam Czartoryski; Zofia Czartoryska; Gabriela Czartoryska
- Father: August Aleksander Czartoryski
- Mother: Maria Zofia Sieniawska

Prince Adam Kazimierz Czartoryski (1 December 1734 – 19 March 1823) was an influential Polish aristocrat, writer, literary and theater critic, linguist, traveller and statesman. He was a great patron of arts and a candidate for the Polish crown. He was educated in England and after his return to Poland in 1758, he became a member of the Sejm (parliament), Crown General of Podolia and Marshal of General Confederation of Kingdom of Poland.

== Biography ==
=== Early life ===
He was the son of Prince August Aleksander Czartoryski, voivode of the Ruthenian Voivodeship, and Maria Zofia Sieniawska. He married his second cousin, Countess Izabela von Flemming on 19 November 1761, in Wołczyn, Poland.

=== Political career ===
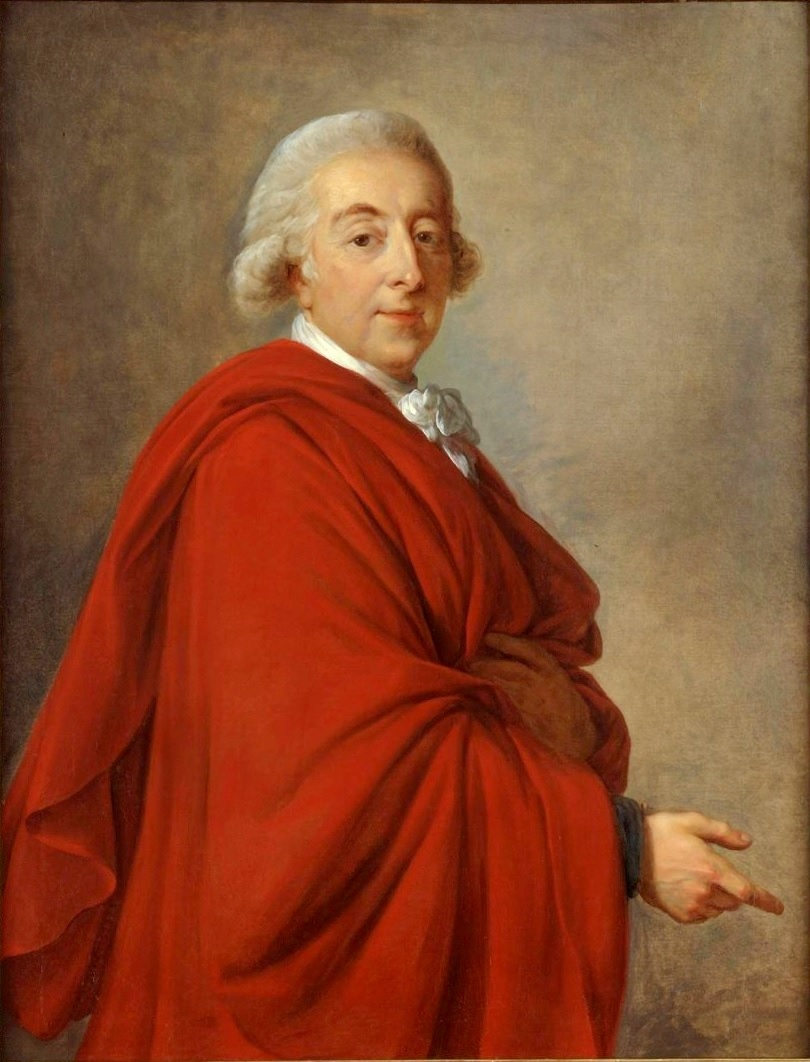
Portrait by Louise Élisabeth Vigée Le Brun, 1793

A member of the Familia, in 1763 he declined to be a candidate for the Polish crown, preferring instead to be a patron of the arts, and withdrawing in favor of Stanisław August Poniatowski. With his wife, Izabela Czartoryska, he created at the Czartoryski Palace in Puławy a major center of Polish intellectual and political life.

He served from 1758 as general starost of Podolia. Founder of the "Little Monitor", in 1765 he co-founded the Monitor, the leading periodical of the Polish Enlightenment. In 1766 he reorganized the Grand Ducal Lithuanian Army. In 1767 he joined the Radom Confederation. In 1768 he became the commander of the School of Chivalry (Corps of Cadets). In 1788-1792 he was Deputy from Lublin to the "Four-Year Sejm." Drawing closer to the king once again, he became a leader of the Patriotic Party and co-founder of Poland's Commission of National Education. He supported the Polish Constitution of 3 May 1791, and headed a diplomatic mission to Dresden, attempting to convince Frederick Augustus III, Elector of Saxony to support the Commonwealth and accept its throne (after Poniatowski's future death). He refused to join the Targowica Confederation established to bring the Constitution down.

He received the Order of the White Eagle on 25 November 1764.

He was Marshal of the Convocation Sejm of 7 May - 23 June 1764, and of the Extraordinary Sejm of 26–28 June 1812, held in Warsaw. Thus he became Marshal of General Confederation of Kingdom of Poland.

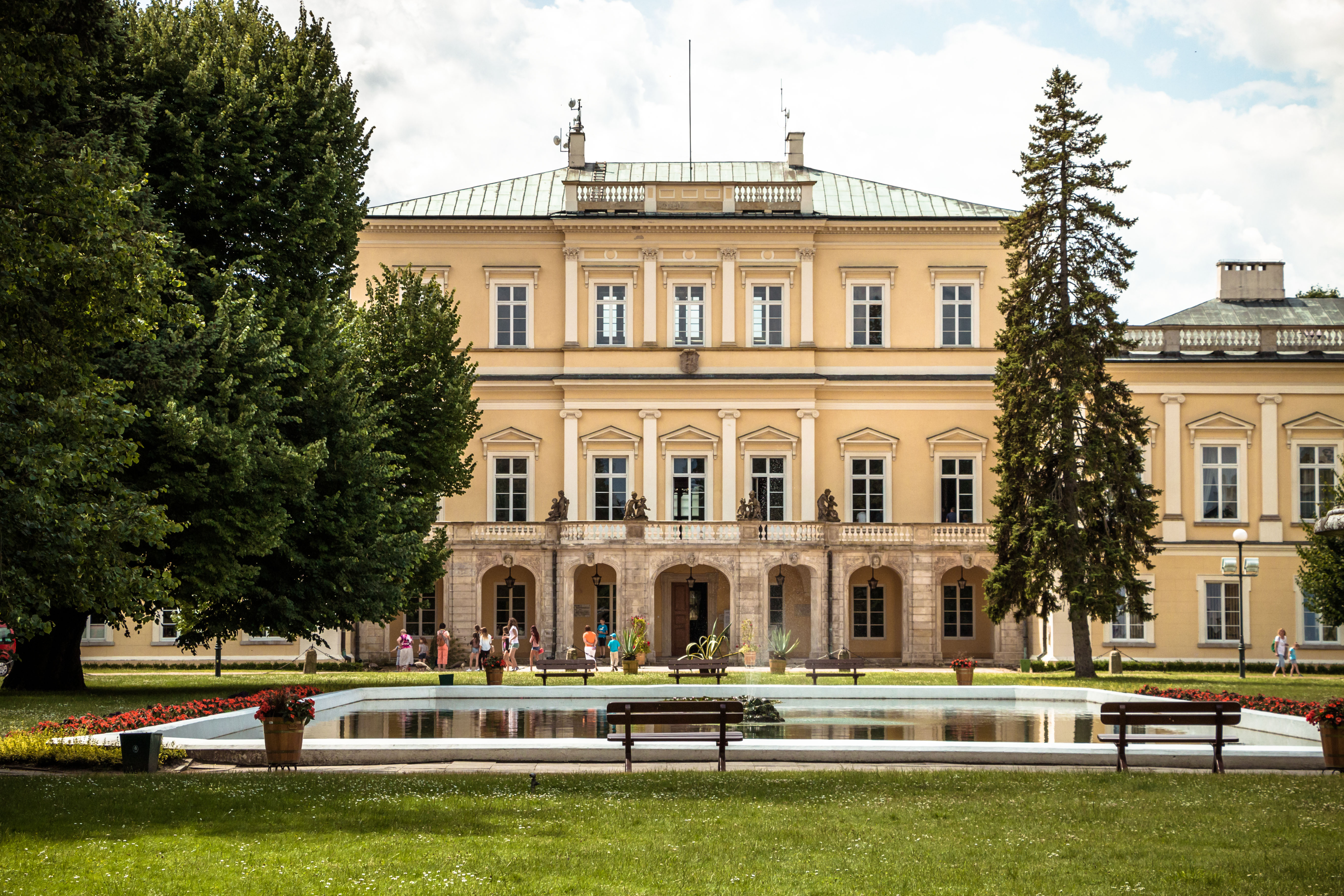
Czartoryski Palace at Puławy

== Remembrance ==
He is one of the figures immortalized in Jan Matejko's 1891 painting, Constitution of May 3, 1791.

== Awards ==
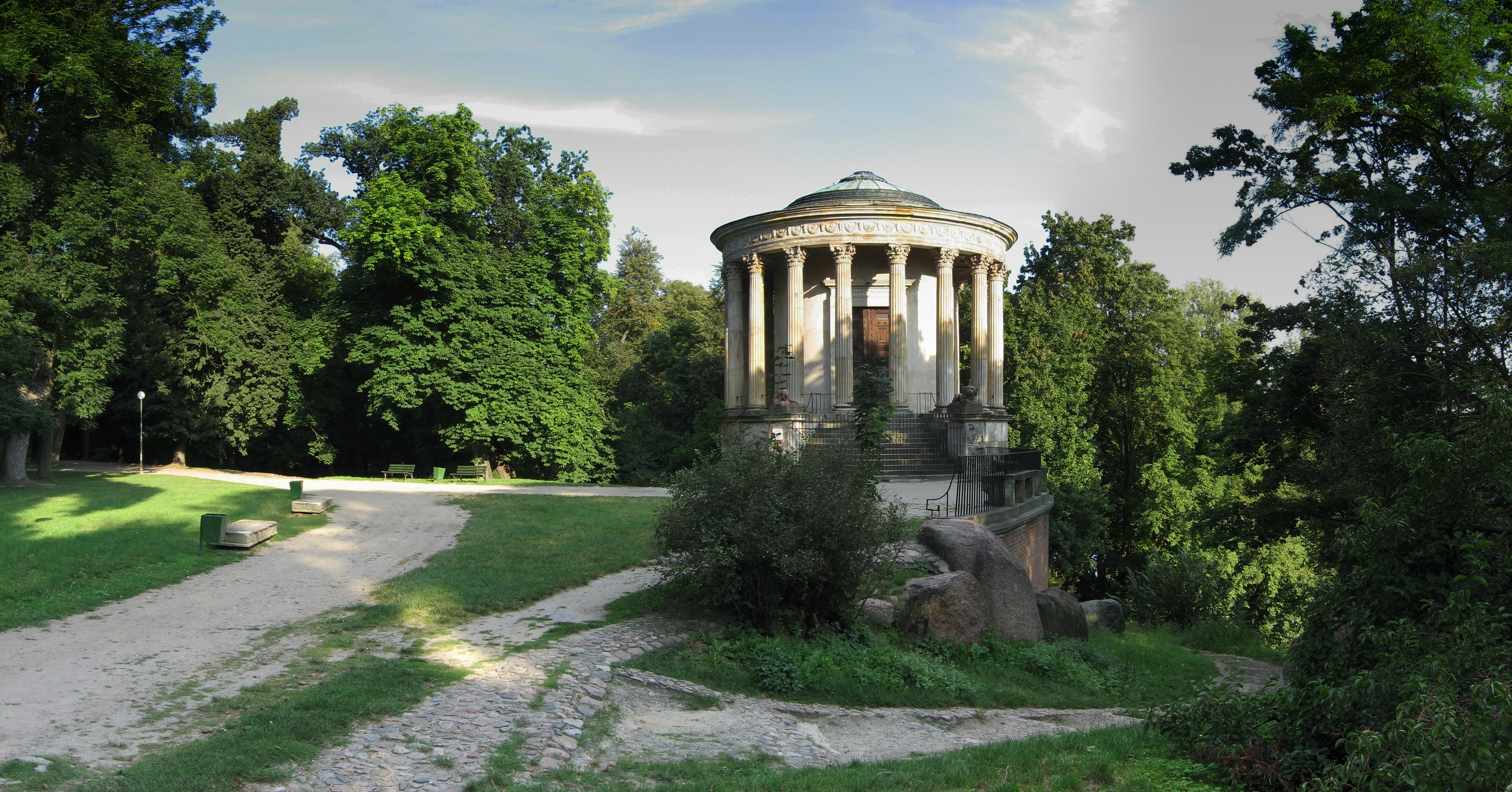
Temple of the Sibyl, Izabela Czartoryska's museum at Puławy

- Order of the White Eagle (25 November 1764)
- Order of Saint Stanisław
- Order of St. Andrew (1762)
- Order of St. Anna
- Knight of the Order of the Golden Fleece (Austria) (1808)

== Works ==
Czartoryski was an author of numerous comedies and plays. He has also written a critical essay on contemporary Polish literature, Myśli o pismach polskich [Thoughts on Polish Writings] (1810).

- Panna na wydaniu (1771).
- Katechizm kadecki (The Cadet's Catechism, 1774).
- Kawa (Coffee, 1779).
- Myśli o pismach polskich [Thoughts on Polish Writings] (1810).

== See also ==
- Adam Jerzy Czartoryski
