= Witold Leon Czartoryski =

Polish noble

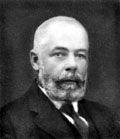

- Coat of arms: Czartoryski
- Born: 10 February 1864; Weinhaus, near Vienna, Austrian Empire
- Died: 6 September 1945 (aged 81); Maków Podhalański, Poland
- Noble family: Czartoryski
- Consort: Jadwiga Dzieduszycka
- Father: Jerzy Konstanty Czartoryski
- Mother: Maria Joanna Czermak

Prince Witold Leon Karol Adam Jarosław Jerzy Czartoryski (10 February 1864 – 6 September 1945) was a Polish noble (szlachcic) and landowner. He served as the general commissar of Galicia and Lodomeria from the end of Russian occupation in 1917 to full incorporation as part of Poland on 1 November 1918. He was a hereditary member of the Austrian House of Lords (Herrenhaus) from 1908 and an elected Senator of the Polish Republic (1922–28)

Witold became owner of Pełkinie, Wiązownica, Konarzewo, Byliny estates in Poland and Weinhaus in Vienna.

Witold was a well-known horse racing enthusiast. He set up a hot bloods stud in Pełkinie, which bred the Arabian horses Czubuthan, Babolna, Ba-Ida, Kasmira and Aeniza.

== Family ==
He was married to Countess Jadwiga Dzieduszycka hr. Sas daughter of Count Włodzimierz Dzieduszycki, married on 21 February 1889 in Lwów. They had twelve children together, including:

- Maria Anna Czartoryska
- Anna Maria Czartoryska
- Kazimierz Jerzy Czartoryski
- Jerzy Piotr Czartoryski
- Włodzimierz Alfons Czartoryski
- Jan Franciszek Czartoryski
- Roman Jacek Czartoryski
- Stanisław Ignacy Czartoryski
- Elżbieta Czartoryska
- Adam Michał Czartoryski
- Witold Tadeusz Czartoryski
- Piotr Michał Czartoryski

== Bibliography ==
- Wincenty Witos, Dzieła Wybrane, tom I: Moje wspomnienia, cz. I, Wyd. LSW, Warszawa 1988.
- Zygmunt Kaczmarek, Marszałkowie Senatu II Rzeczypospolitej, Wydawnictwo Sejmowe 1992.
- Stanisław Grodziski, Sejm Krajowy galicyjski 1861–1914, Wydawnictwo Sejmowe Warszawa 1993.
- "Kto był kim w Drugiej Rzeczypospolitej", red. nauk. prof. Jacek M. Majchrowski przy współpracy Grzegorza Mazura i Kamila Stepana, Polska Oficyna Wydawnucza "BGW", Warszawa 1994.
- Michał Czajka, Marcin Kamler, Witold Sienkiewicz, Leksykon Historii Polski, Wyd. Wiedza Powszechna, Warszawa 1995.
- Tomasz Lenczewski, Genealogie rodów utytułowanych w Polsce, Warszawa 1995- 1996.
- Józef Buszko, Polacy w parlamencie wiedeńskim 1848–1918, Warszawa 1996.
