= Jerzy Konstanty Czartoryski =

Polish noble and politician (1828–1912)

- Prince
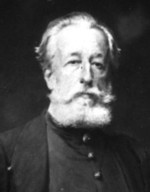
- Coat of arms: Czartoryski
- Born: 24 April 1828; Dresden, German Confederation
- Died: 23 December 1912 (aged 84); Vienna, Austria-Hungary
- Family: Czartoryski
- Consort: Marie Čermáková
- Issue: Wanda Czartoryska; Witold Leon Czartoryski
- Father: Konstanty Adam Czartoryski
- Mother: Maria Dzierżonowska

Prince Jerzy Konstanty Czartoryski (24 April 1828 – 23 December 1912) was a Polish noble (szlachcic) and politician.

== Biography ==
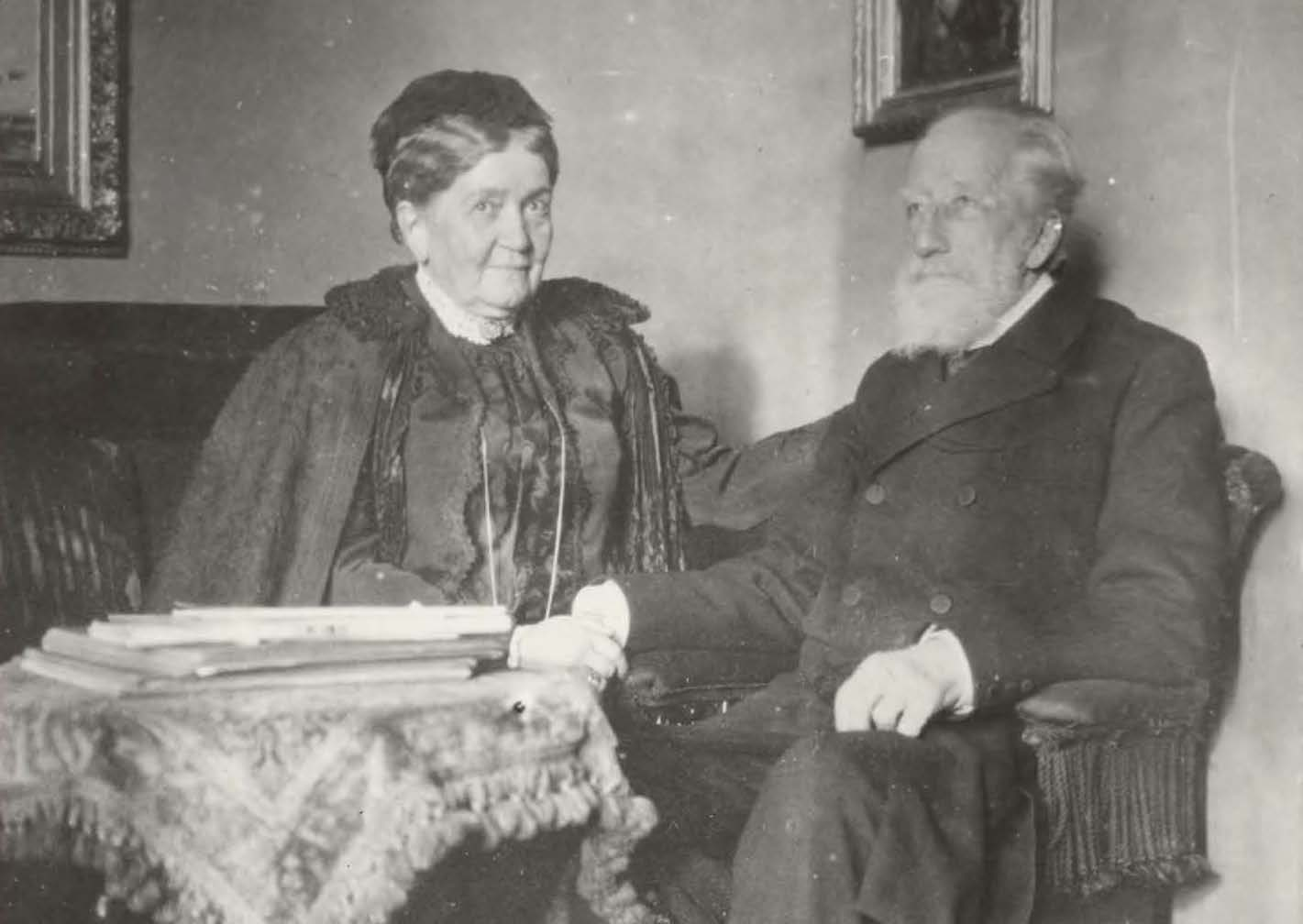
Prince Jerzy Konstanty Czartoryski and his wife Maria Joanna Czartoryska (née Czermaków)

Jerzy Konstanty Czartoryski was the son of Konstanty Adam Czartoryski and Maria née Dzierżanowska. He was born in Dresden on 24 April 1828.

He spent his youth in Vienna, in the family palace of Weinhaus, engaged in musical activities. In 1861 he married Maria Čermák, the daughter of a Prague physician and sister of the Czech painter Jaroslav. Marrying someone from outside the circle of the Polish magnates was unusual and also brought Czartoryski closer to Czech national circles. In 1866 he settled in Galicia on the family estate in Wiązownica. In 1867 he entered the Galician Diet. He supported efforts to expand Galician autonomy. He advocated for a federal restructuring of the Austro-Hungarian monarchy, cooperation between Polish and Czech politicians, and reaching an agreement with the Ruthenians. At the same time, he opposed direct elections in Galicia to the Imperial Council, was a staunch supporter of autonomy, and an opponent of close cooperation between the Polish Circle deputies and the central government.

In 1887 he became an Austrian Privy Councillor. In 1891 the emperor appointed him a hereditary member of the House of Lords in order to distance him from the lower chamber. In the Galician Diet he mainly dealt with educational matters. He also carried out active social and educational work in Galicia, especially on his family estates. His last speech in the Diet was in 1901, a protest against the Prussian abuses in Września.

He died on 23 December 1912 in Vienna. His son was Witold Czartoryski, his daughter Wanda Czartoryska.
