= Piotr Michał Czartoryski =

Polish noble (1909–1993)

- Prince
- Coat of arms: Czartoryski
- Born: 1 September 1909; Pełkinie, Austria-Hungary
- Died: 17 December 1993 (aged 84); North Vancouver, Canada
- Noble family: Czartoryski
- Consort: Anna Zamoyska
- Father: Witold Leon Czartoryski
- Mother: Jadwiga Dzieduszycka

Prince Piotr Michał Czartoryski (1 September 1909 – 17 December 1993) was a Polish noble (szlachcic).

Piotr became Master Engineer, Doctor Honoris Causa of the Jagiellonian University and was Captain (reserve) of the Armia Krajowa, during the Second World War.

He married Anna Zamoyska and had three children, Monika Maria Czartoryska, Krzysztof Piotr Czartoryski and Joanna Maria Czartoryska.
