= Czartoryski =

Polish princely family

- Princely House of Poland
- Czartoryski coat of arms
- Current region: Poland
- Origin: Czartorysk
- Members: Michał Czartoryski; August Czartoryski; Adam Kazimierz Czartoryski; Adam Jerzy Czartoryski; Izabela Flemming
- Connected families: Sieniawski, Wiśniowiecki, Sobieski, Leszczyński, Poniatowski, Lubomirski, Radziwiłł, Jagiellonian Wielopolski
- Traditions: Familia
- Motto: Bądź co bądź (Come what may)
- Estate: Czartoryski Palace

The House of Czartoryski (feminine form: Czartoryska, plural: Czartoryscy; Lithuanian: Čartoriskiai) is a Polish princely family of Lithuanian-Ruthenian origin, also known as the Familia. The family, which derived their kin from the Gediminids dynasty, by the mid-17th century had split into two branches, based in the Klevan Castle and the Korets Castle, respectively. They used the Czartoryski coat of arms and were a noble family of the Polish–Lithuanian Commonwealth in the 18th century.

The Czartoryski and the Potocki were the two most influential aristocratic families of the last decades of the Polish–Lithuanian Commonwealth (1569–1795).

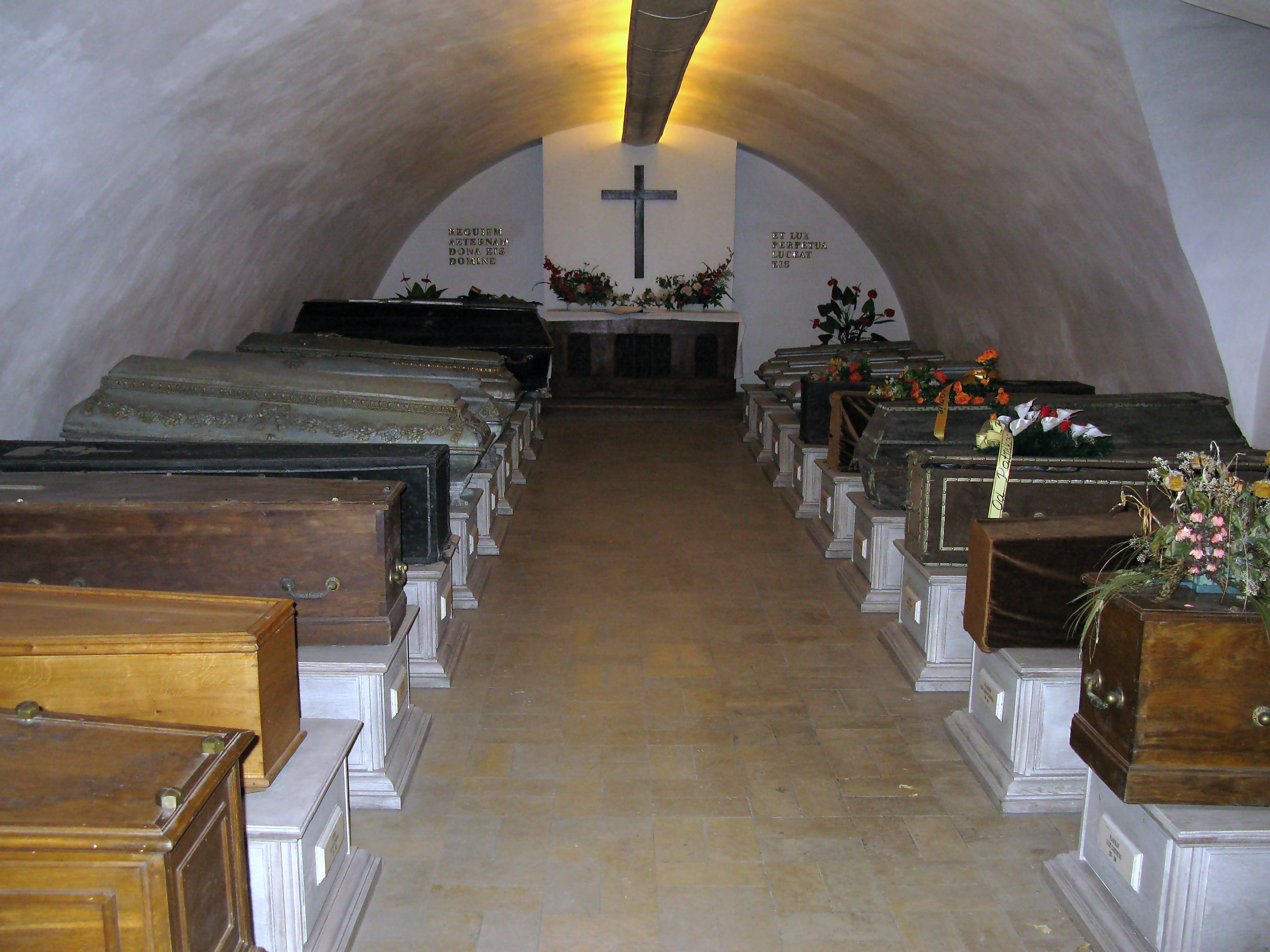
Czartoryski family vault in Sieniawa

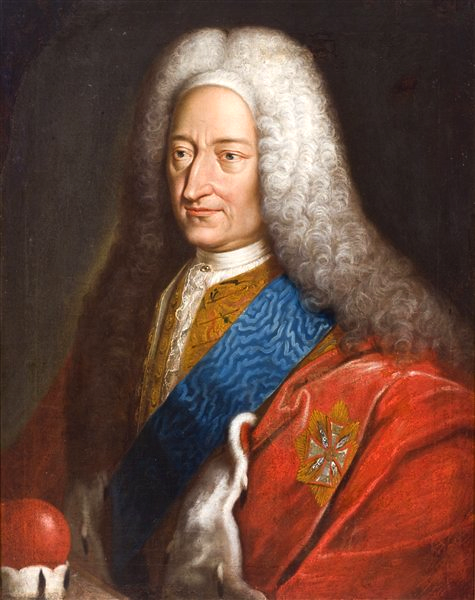
Kazimierz Czartoryski, founder of the "Familia"

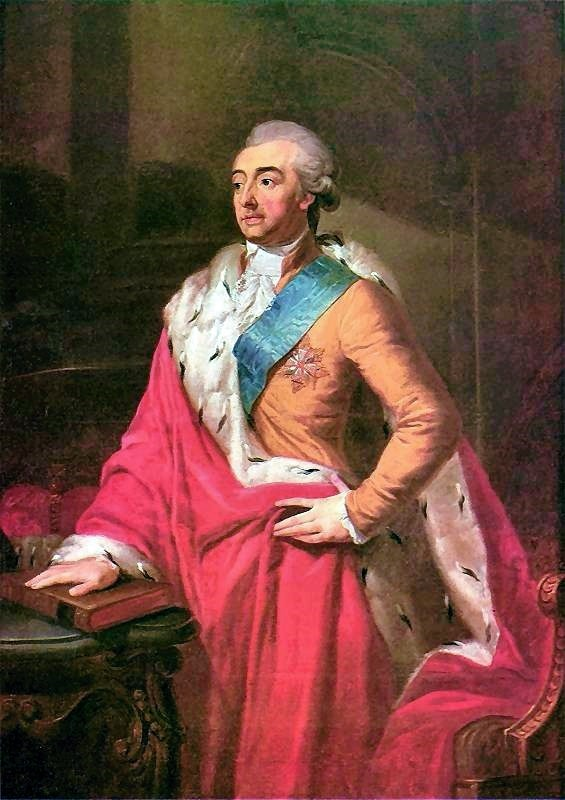
Adam Kazimierz Czartoryski; portrait by Józef Peszka

== History ==
The Czartoryski family is of Lithuanian descent from Ruthenia. Their ancestor, a grandson of Gediminas, the Grand Duke of Lithuania, became known with his baptismal name Constantine (c. 1330−1390) - he became a Prince of Chortoryisk in Volhynia. One of his sons, Vasyli Chortoryiski (Ukrainian: Чарторийський; c. 1375–1416), was granted an estate in Volhynia in 1393, and his three sons John, Alexander and Michael (c. 1400–1489) are considered the progenitors of the family. The founding members were culturally Ruthenian and Eastern Orthodox; they converted to Roman Catholicism and were Polonized during the 16th century.

Michael's descendant Prince Kazimierz Czartoryski (1674–1741), Duke of Klewan and Zukow (Klevan and Zhukiv), Castellan of Vilnius, reawakened Czartoryski royal ambitions at the end of the 17th century. He married Isabella Morsztyn, daughter of the Grand Treasurer of Poland, and built the Familia with their four children, Michał, August, Teodor and Konstancja. The family became known and powerful under the lead of brothers Michał Fryderyk Czartoryski and August Aleksander Czartoryski in the late Polish–Lithuanian Commonwealth of the 18th century, during the reigns Augustus II the Strong (King of Poland, 1697–1706 and 1709–1733) and Stanisław I Leszczyński (King of Poland 1704–1709 and 1733–1736). The Czartoryski had risen to power under August Aleksander Czartoryski (1697–1782) of the Klewa line, who married Zofia Denhoffowa, the only heir to the Sieniawski family.

The family attained the height of its influence from the mid-18th century in the court of King Augustus III (r. 1734–1763). The Czartoryski brothers gained a very powerful ally in their brother-in-law, Stanisław Poniatowski, whose son became the last king of the independent Polish-Lithuanian Commonwealth, Stanisław August Poniatowski (r. 1764–1795).

The Czartoryski's Familia saw the decline of the Commonwealth and the rise of anarchy and joined the camp which was determined to press ahead with reforms; thus they sought the enactment of such constitutional reforms as the abolition of the liberum veto.

Although the Russian Empire confiscated the family estate at Puławy in 1794, during the third partition of Poland, the Familia continued to wield significant cultural and political influence for decades after, notably through the princes Adam Kazimierz (1734–1823), Adam Jerzy (1770–1861) and Konstanty Adam (1777–1866).

The Czartoryski family is renowned for the Czartoryski Museum in Kraków and the Hôtel Lambert in Paris.

Today, the only descendants of Prince Adam Jerzy Czartoryski are Prince Adam Karol Czartoryski (1940- ) and his daughter Tamara Czartoryska (1978- ), who live in the United Kingdom. The descendants of Prince Konstanty Adam Czartoryski live to this day in Poland and have their representatives in the Confederation of the Polish Nobility.

== Coat of arms and motto ==
The Czartoryski family used the Czartoryski coat of arms and the motto Bądź co bądź ("Come what may", literally 'let be, that which will be'). The family's arms were a modification of the Pogoń Litewska arms.

Czartoryski coat of arms used in 1785

== Notable members ==
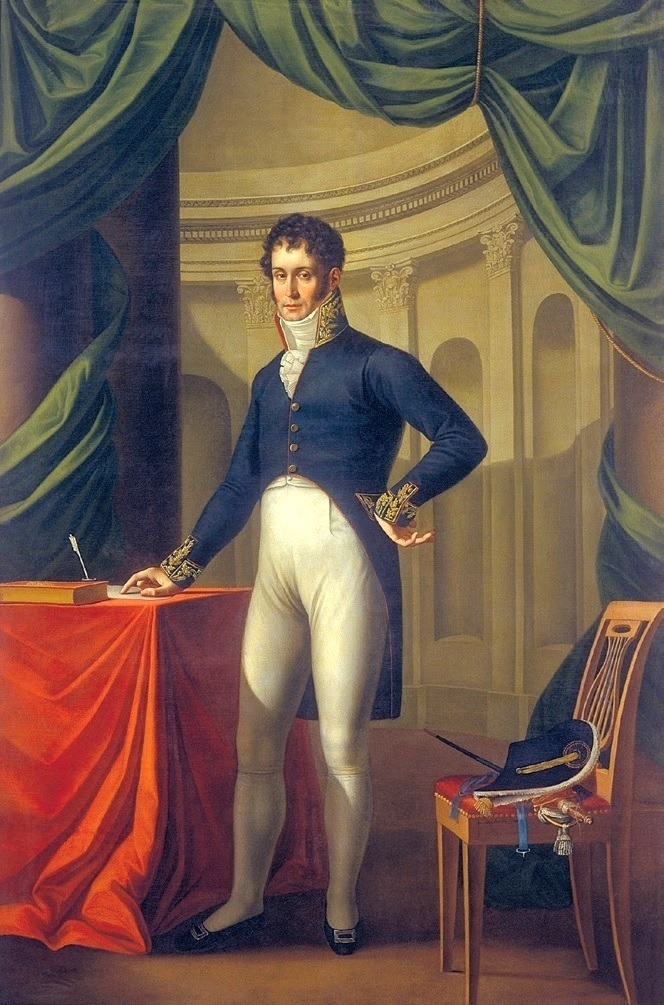
Adam Jerzy Czartoryski; portrait by Józef Oleszkiewicz

Notable members include:

=== In Poland ===
- Wasyl Czartoryski (died after 1416), married Hanna
  - Michał Czartoryski (died before 1486), married Maria Niemir
    - Teodor Czartoryski (died 1542), married Princes Zofia Sanguszko h. Pogoń Litewska
      - Iwan Czartoryski (died 1566), married Princess Anna Zasławska h. Korybut
        - Jerzy Czartoryski (1550−1626), married Princess Aleksandra Wiśniowiecka h. Korybut, Halszka Hołowińska h. Hołowiński and Princess Zofia Lubomirska h. Szreniawa
          - Michał Jerzy Czartoryski (1585−1661), married Princess Izabella Korecka h. Pogoń Litewska
            - Michał Jerzy Czartoryski (1621−1692), married Rosine Margarethe von Eckenberg, Eufrozyna Stanisławska h. Szeliga and Joanna Weronika Olędzka h. Rawa
              - Kazimierz Czartoryski (1674−1741), married Countess Izabela Elżbieta Morsztyn h. Leliwa
                - Michał Fryderyk Czartoryski (1696–1775), married Countess Elenora Monika Waldstein
                - August Aleksander Czartoryski (1697−1782) married Countess Maria Zofia Sieniawska h. Leliwa
                  - Adam Kazimierz Czartoryski (1734–1823), married Izabela Czartoryska h. Fleming
                    - Maria Anna Czartoryska (1768−1854), married Louis, Duke of Württemberg
                    - Adam Jerzy Czartoryski (1770–1861), married Princess Anna Zofia Sapieha h. Lis
                      - Izabella Elżbieta Czartoryska (1832–1899), married Count Jan Kanty Działyński h. Ogończyk
                      - Witold Czartoryski (1824–1865), married Maria Cycylia Grocholska h. Syrokomla
                      - Władysław Czartoryski (1828–1894), married María Amparo Muñoz, 1st Countess of Vista Alegre and Princess Marguerite Adélaïde of Orléans
                        - Beatified August Franciszek Czartoryski (1858–1893)
                        - Adam Ludwik Czartoryski (1872–1937), married Countess Maria Ludwika Krasińska h. Ślepowron
                          - Elżbieta Czartoryska (1905–1989) married Count Stefan Adam Zamoyski h. Jelita
                          - Augustyn Józef Czartoryski (1907–1946), married Princess Maria de los Dolores of Bourbon-Two Sicilies
                            - Adam Karol Czartoryski (b. 1940), married Nora Picciotto and Josette Calil
                              - Tamara Czartoryska (b. 1978)
                    - Konstanty Adam Czartoryski (1773–1860), married Princess Aniela Radziwiłł h. Trąby and Maria Dzierżanowska h. Gozdawa
                      - Jerzy Konstanty Czartoryski (1828–1912), married Maria Joanna Czermak
                        - Witold Leon Czartoryski (1864–1945), married Countess Jadwiga Dzieduszycka h. Sas
                          - Włodzimierz Alfons Czartoryski (1895–1975), married Countess Zofia Tyszkiewicz h. Leliwa
                            - Professor Paweł Czartoryski (1924–1999)
                          - Beatified Jan Franciszek Czartoryski (1897–1944)
                          - Roman Jacek Czartoryski (1898–1958), married Countess Teresa Janina Zamoyska h. Jelita
                          - Piotr Michał Czartoryski (1908–1993), married Countess Anna Zamoyska h. Jelita
                    - Zofia Czartoryska (1780−1873), married Count Stanisław Kostka Zamoyski h. Jelita
                  - Elżbieta Czartoryska (1736–1816), married Stanisław Lubomirski h. Szreniawa
                - Konstancja Czartoryska (1700–1759), married Stanisław Poniatowski h. Ciołek, mother of the last King of Poland Stanisław August Poniatowski

=== In Hungary ===
- Piotr Czartoryski ( wife: Lázár Mária)
- Mária Lázár (b. Mária Czartoriska) (1895–1983), actress ( mother: Lázár Mária)
- Serbán Ivánné (b. Magdolna Irén Czartoryska (mother: Lázár Mária)
- sons of Magdolna Iren Czartoryska
- Wachtel Elemér
- Wachtel Domonkos
- Dr Czartoryski Jenö (mother: Lázár Maria)
- sons of Jenö Czartoryski
- Adam Czartoryski born Budapest, Uppsala, Sweden
- Ivan Czartoryski born Budapest, Uppsala, Sweden, architect

== Palaces ==
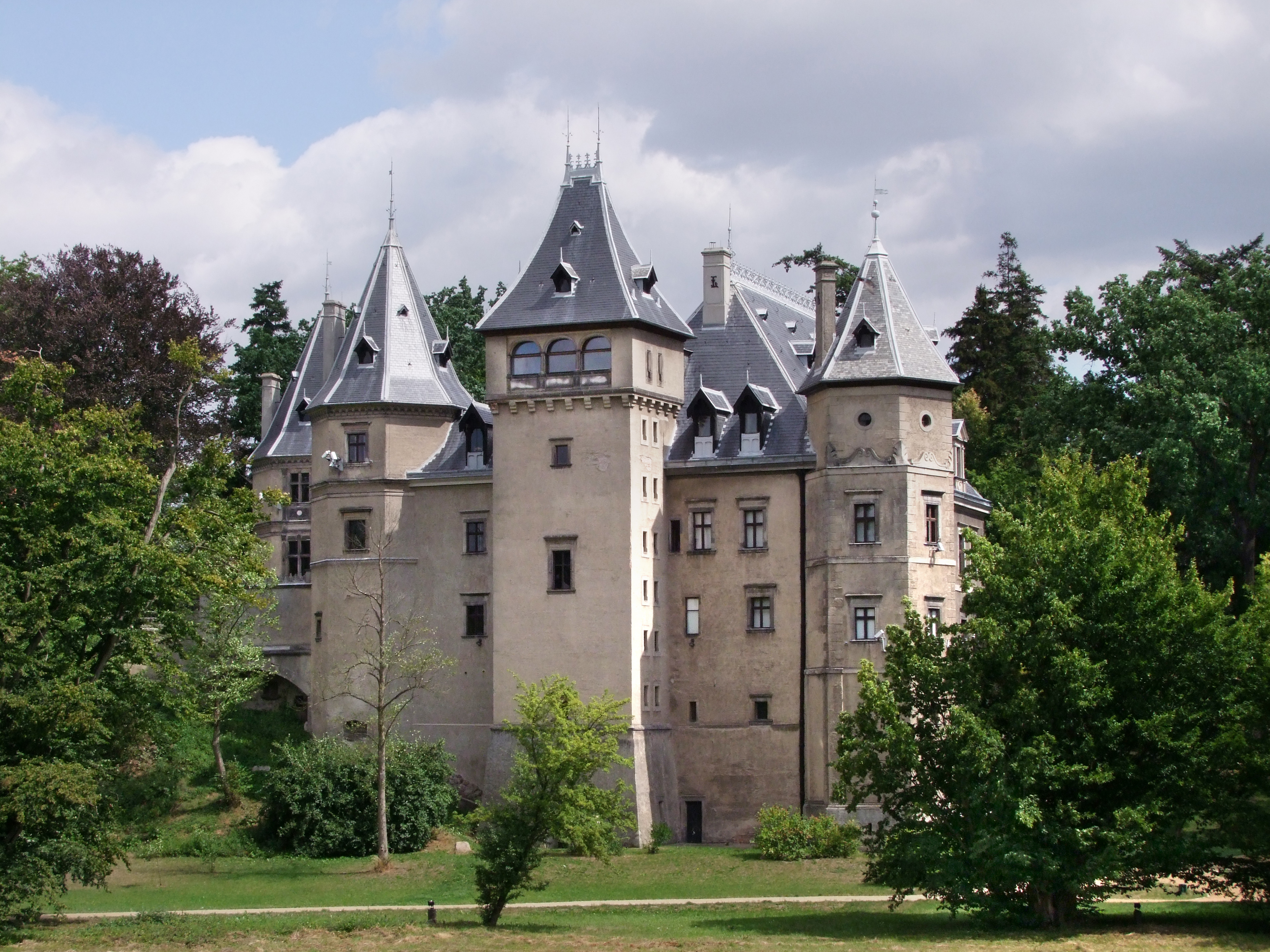
Gołuchów Castle

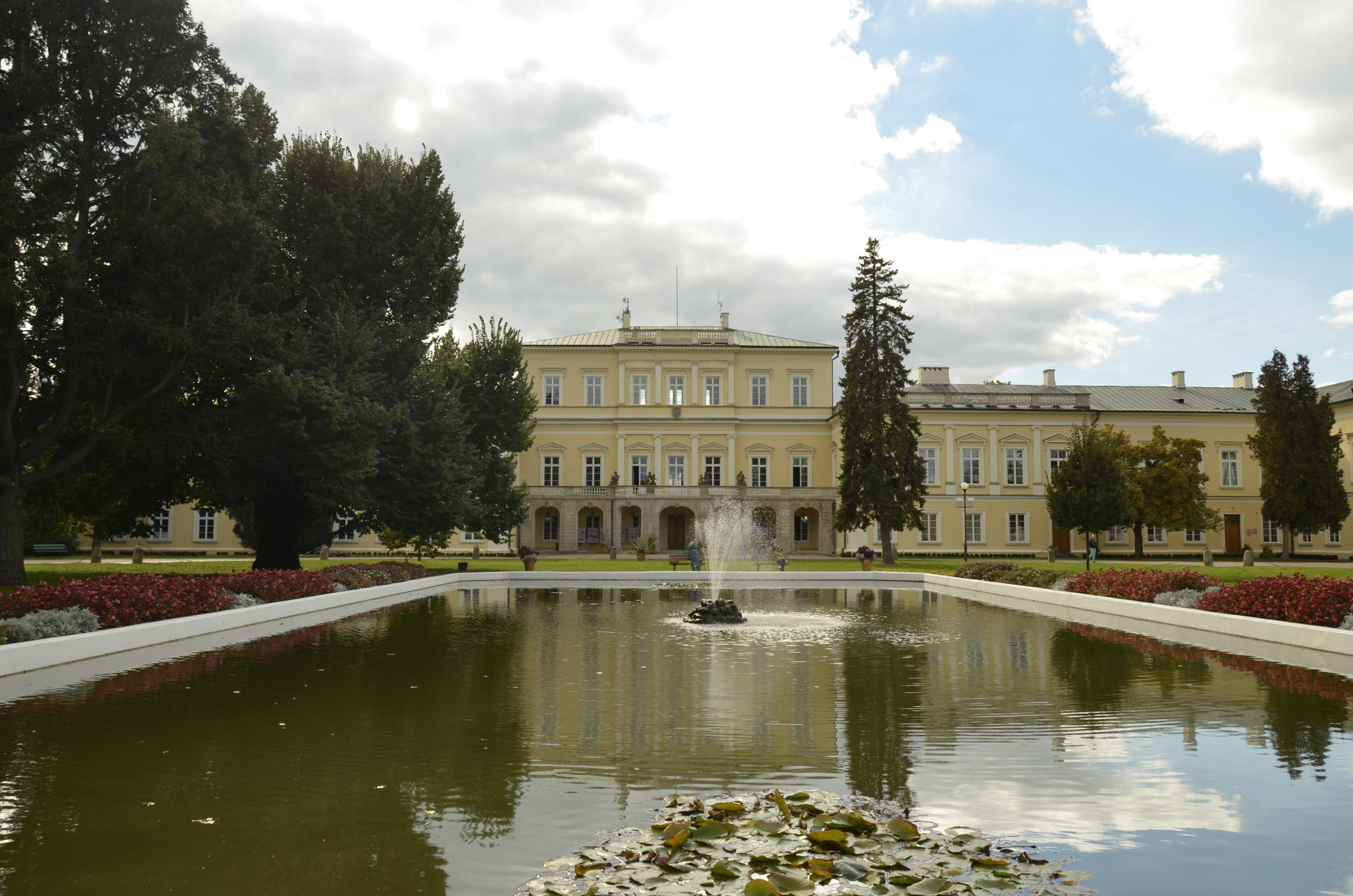
Czartoryski Palace in Puławy

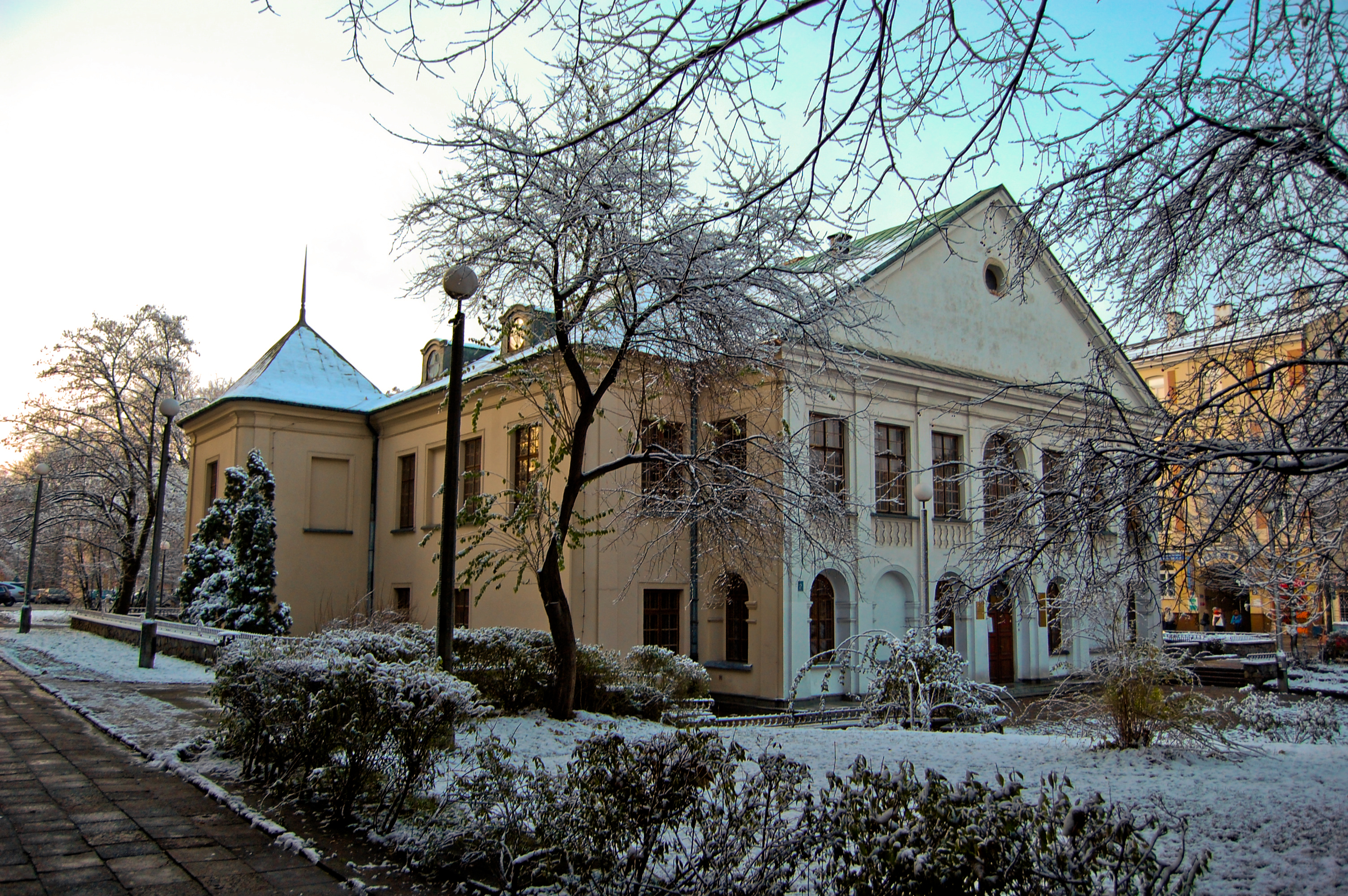
Czartoryski Palace in Lublin

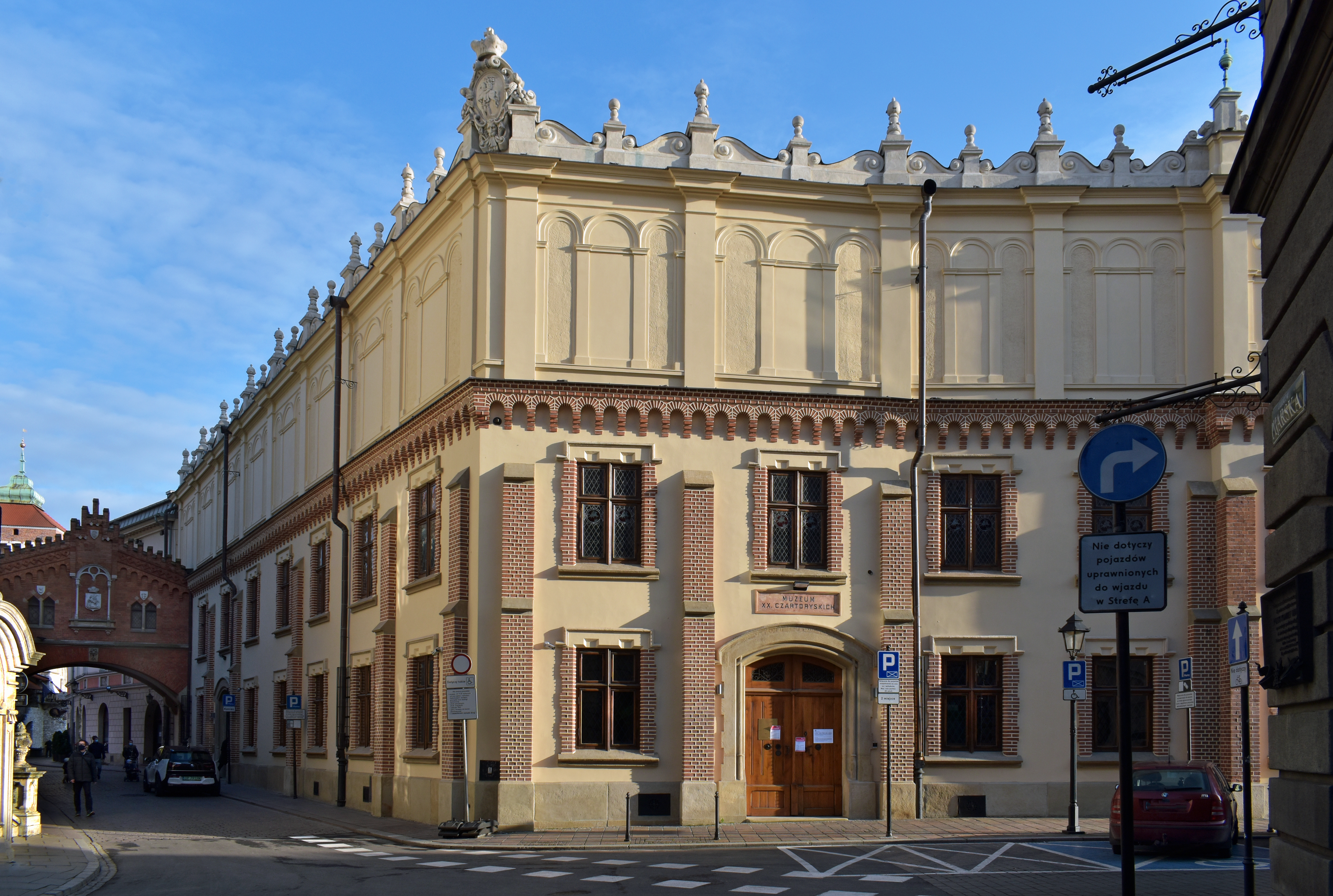
Czartoryski Museum in Kraków

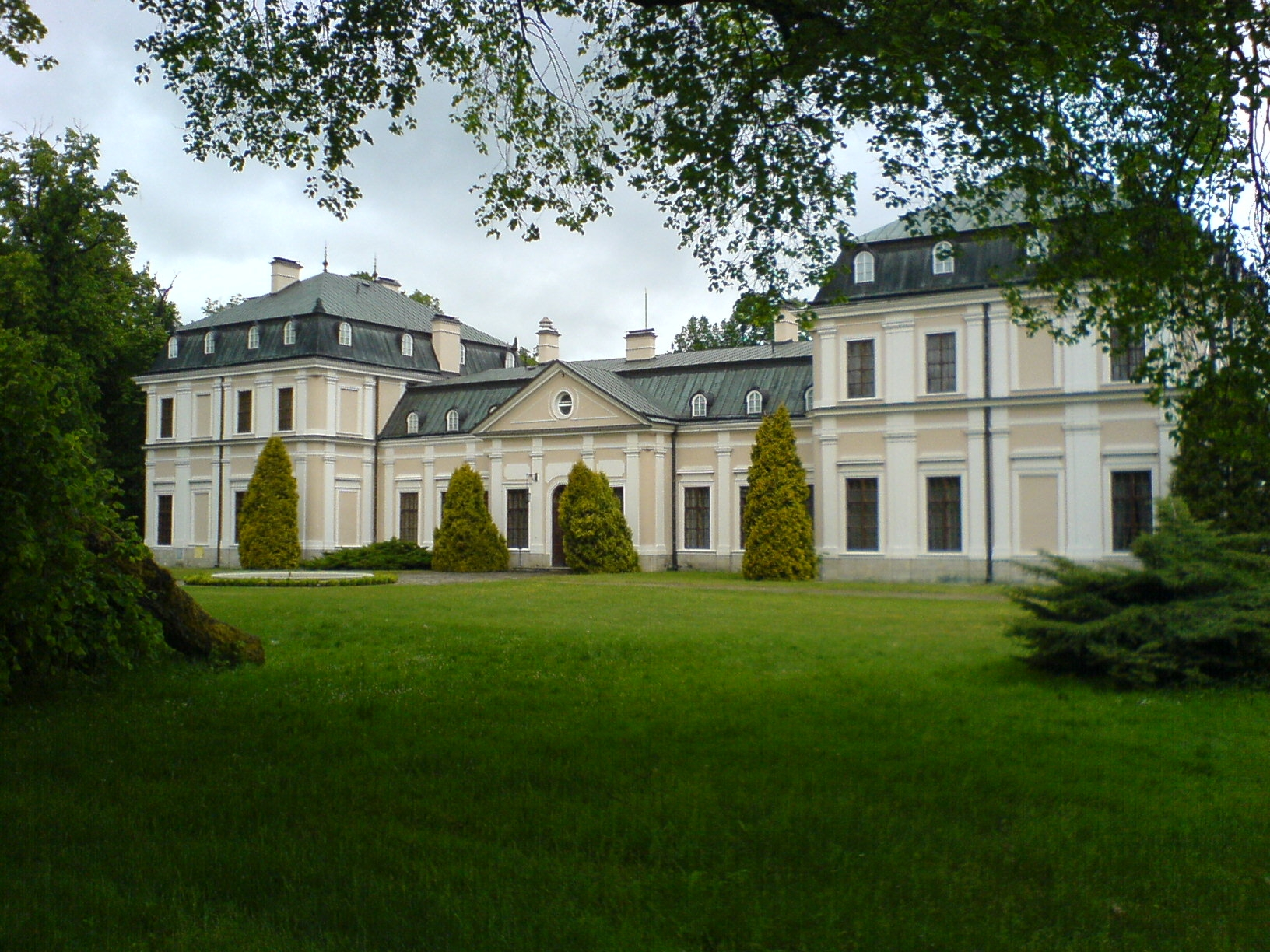
Czartoryski Palace in Sieniawa

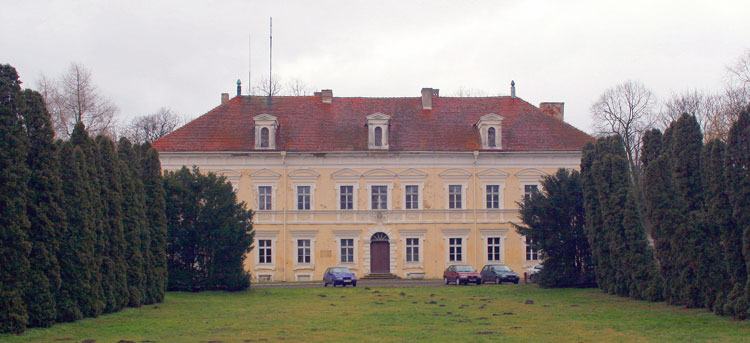
Konarzew Palace

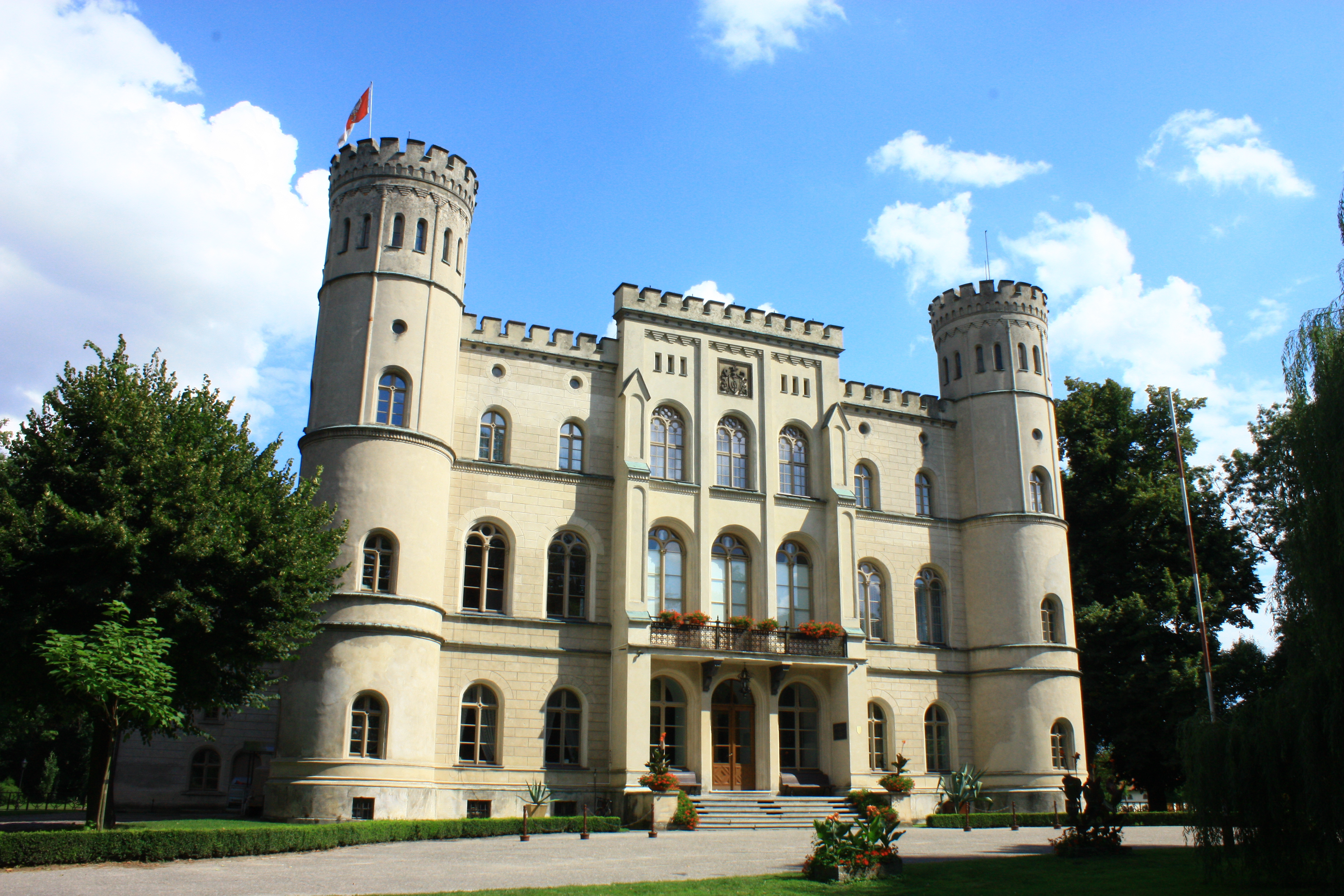
Palace in Rokosowo

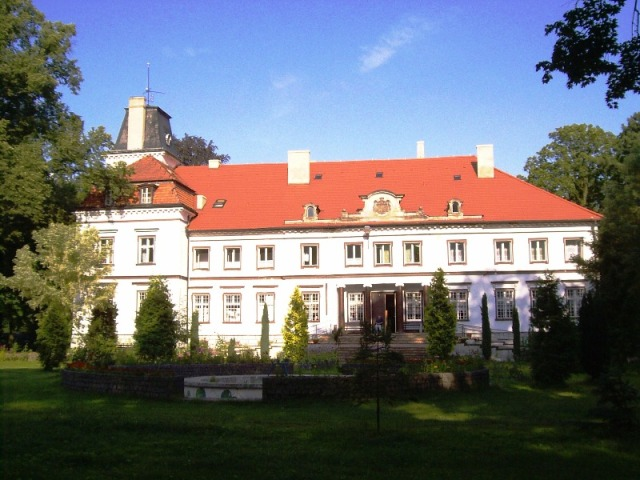
Palace in Baszków, Łódź Voivodeship

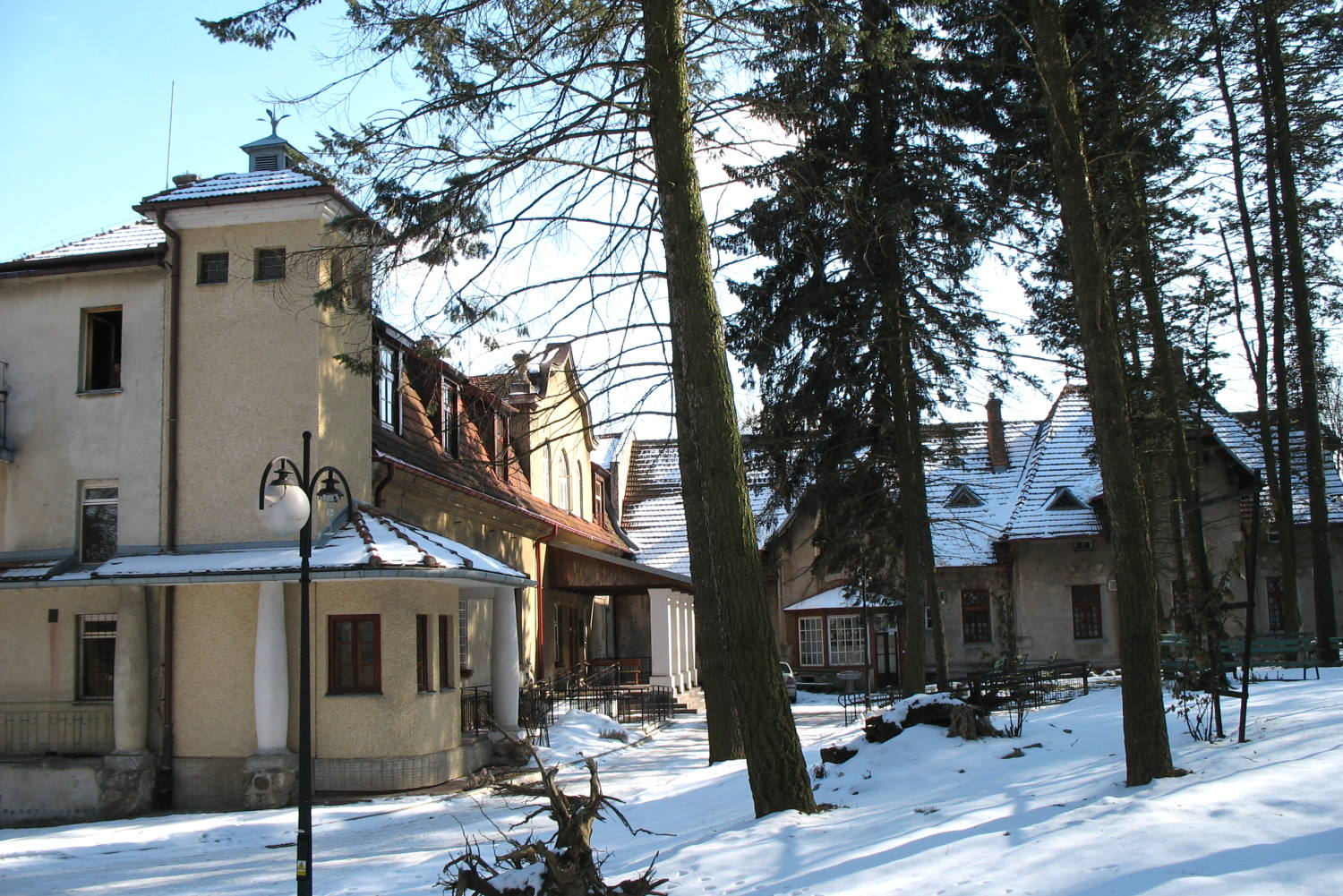
Palace in Pełkinie

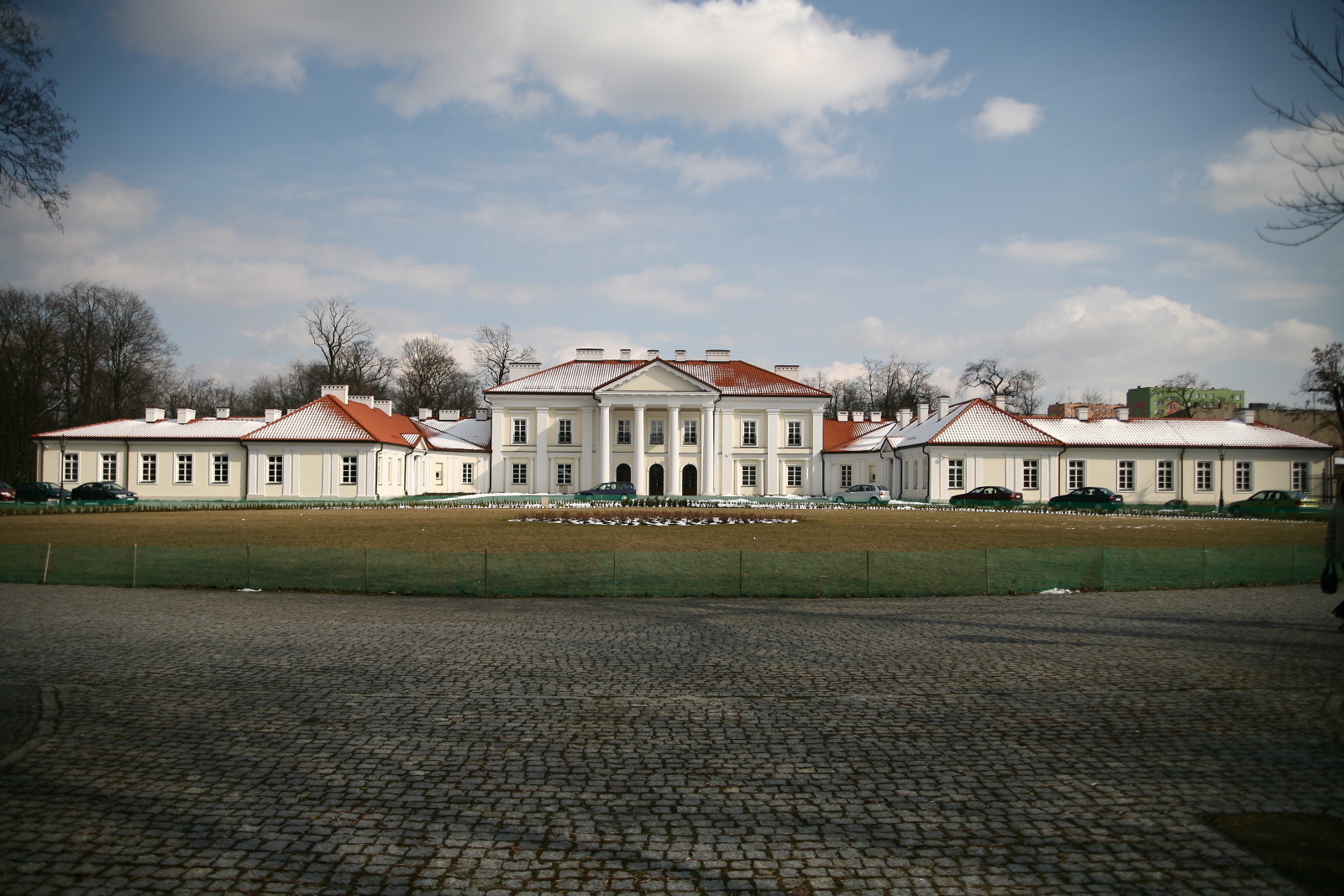
Siedlce Palace

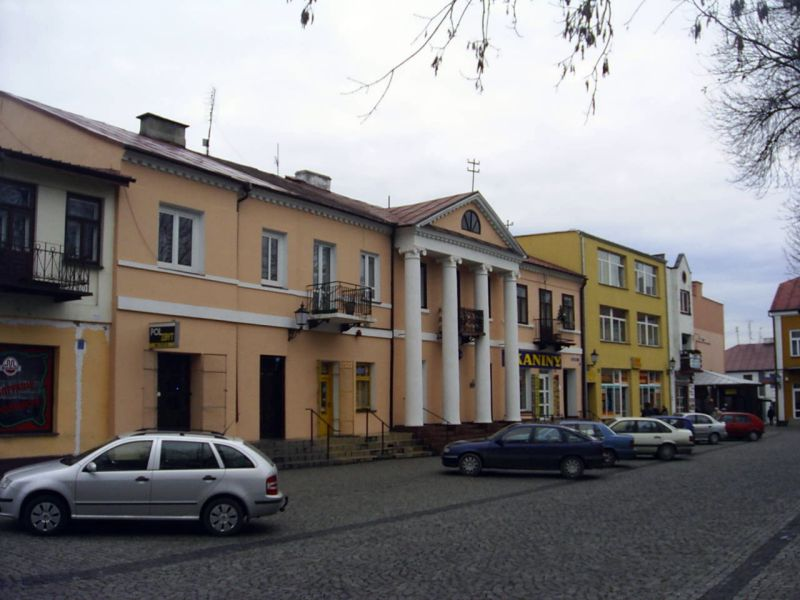
Palace in Międzyrzec Podlaski

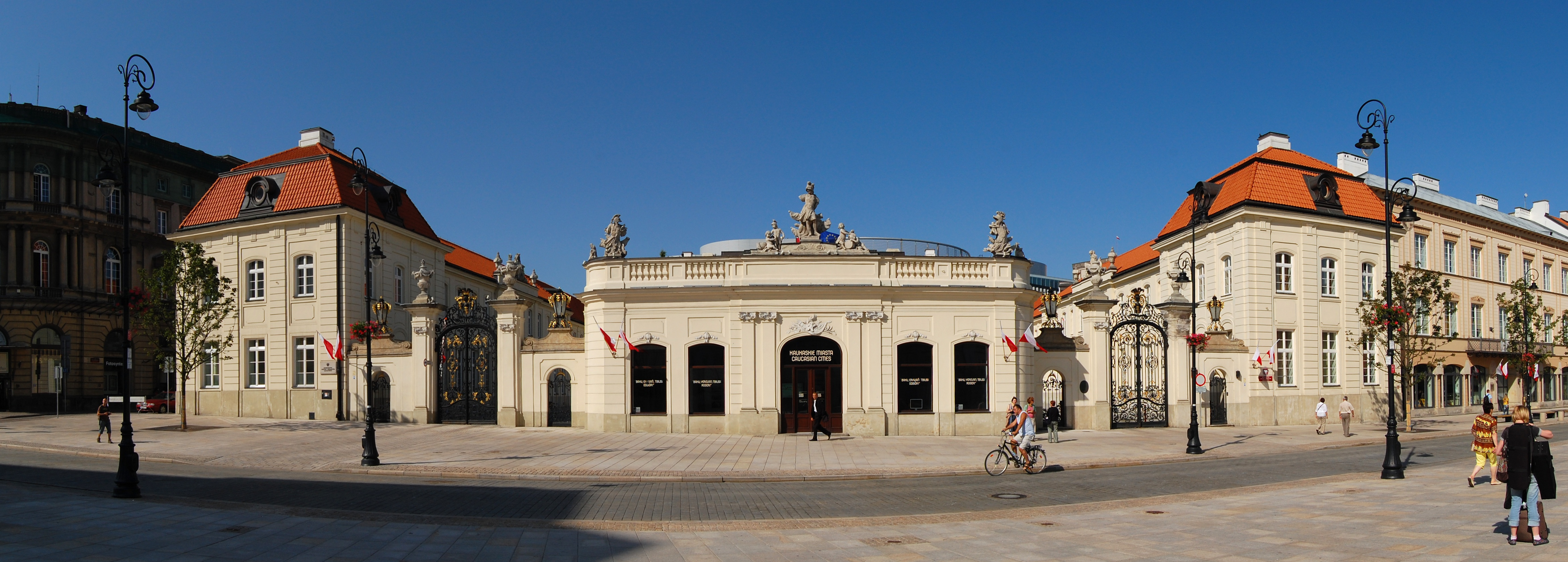
Potocki Palace, Warsaw

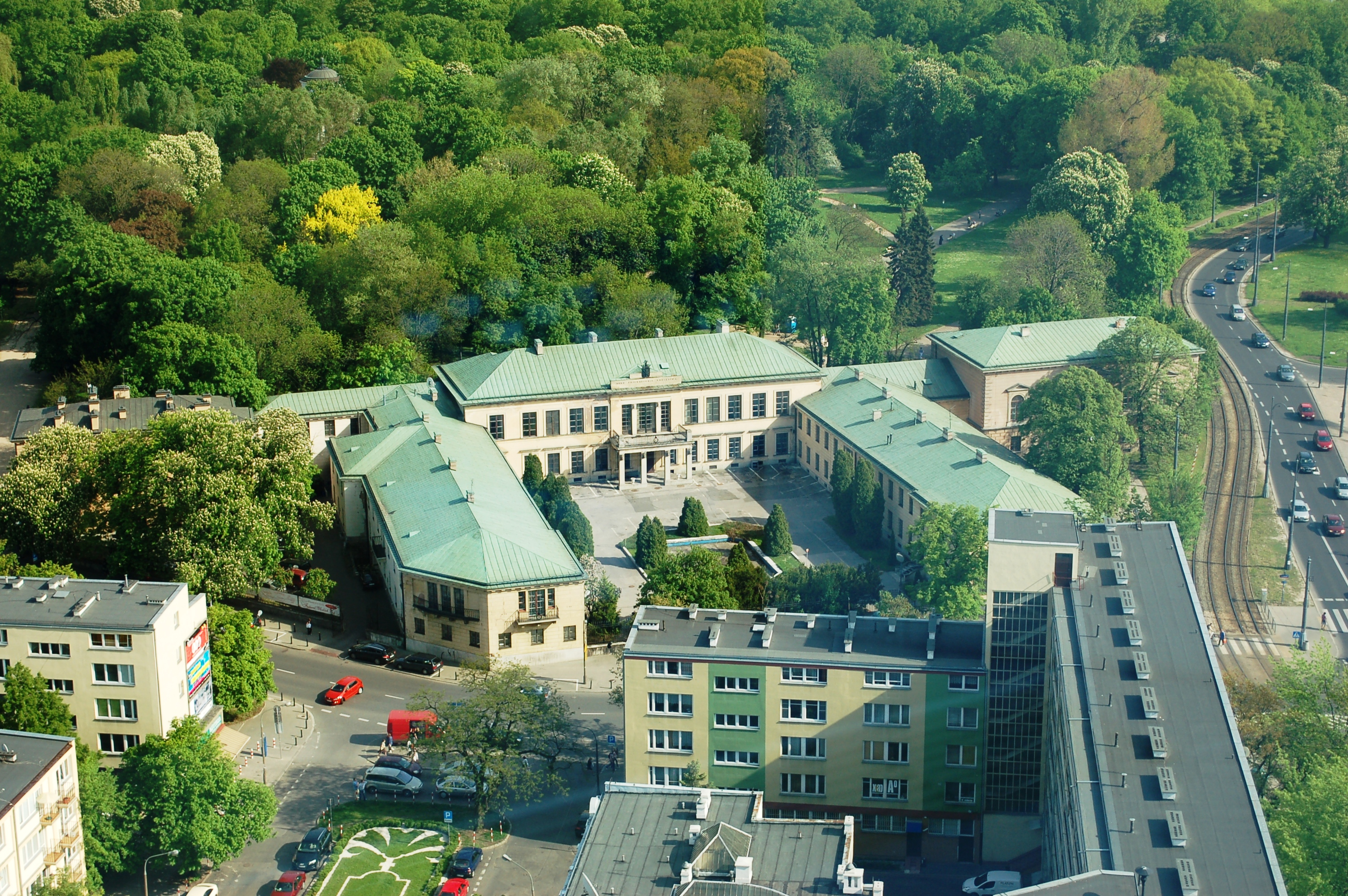
The Blue Palace, Warsaw

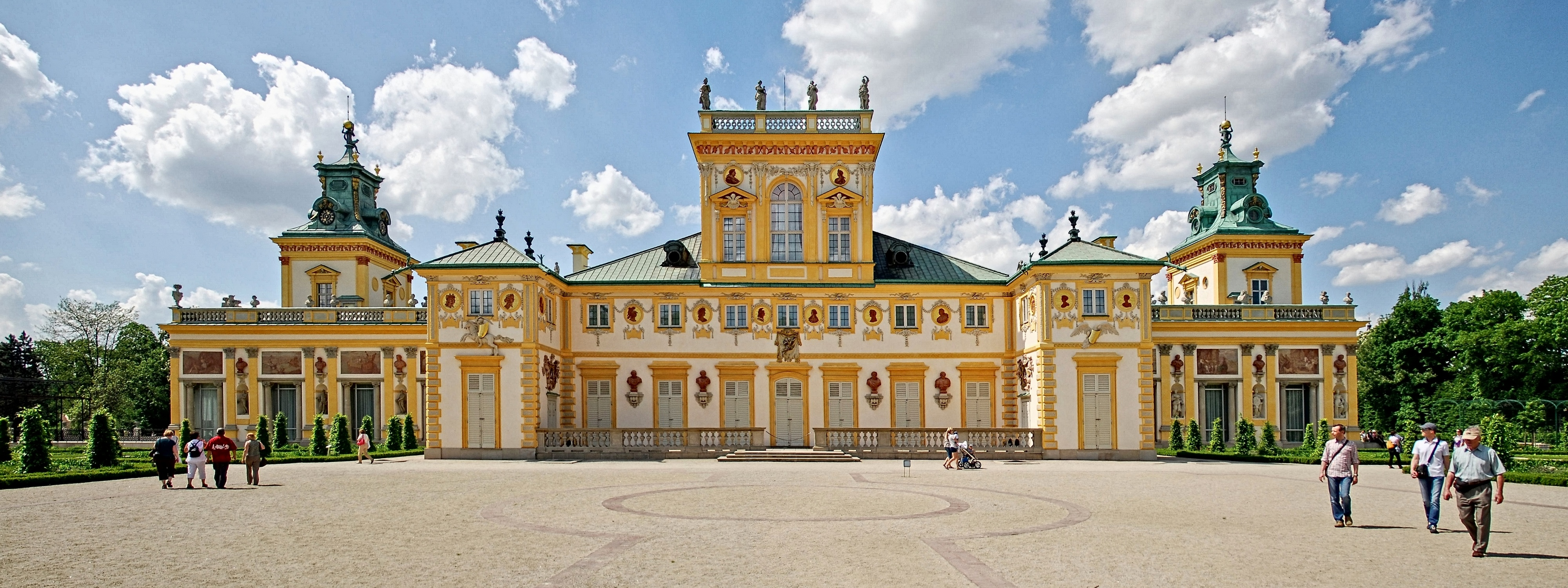
Wilanów Palace

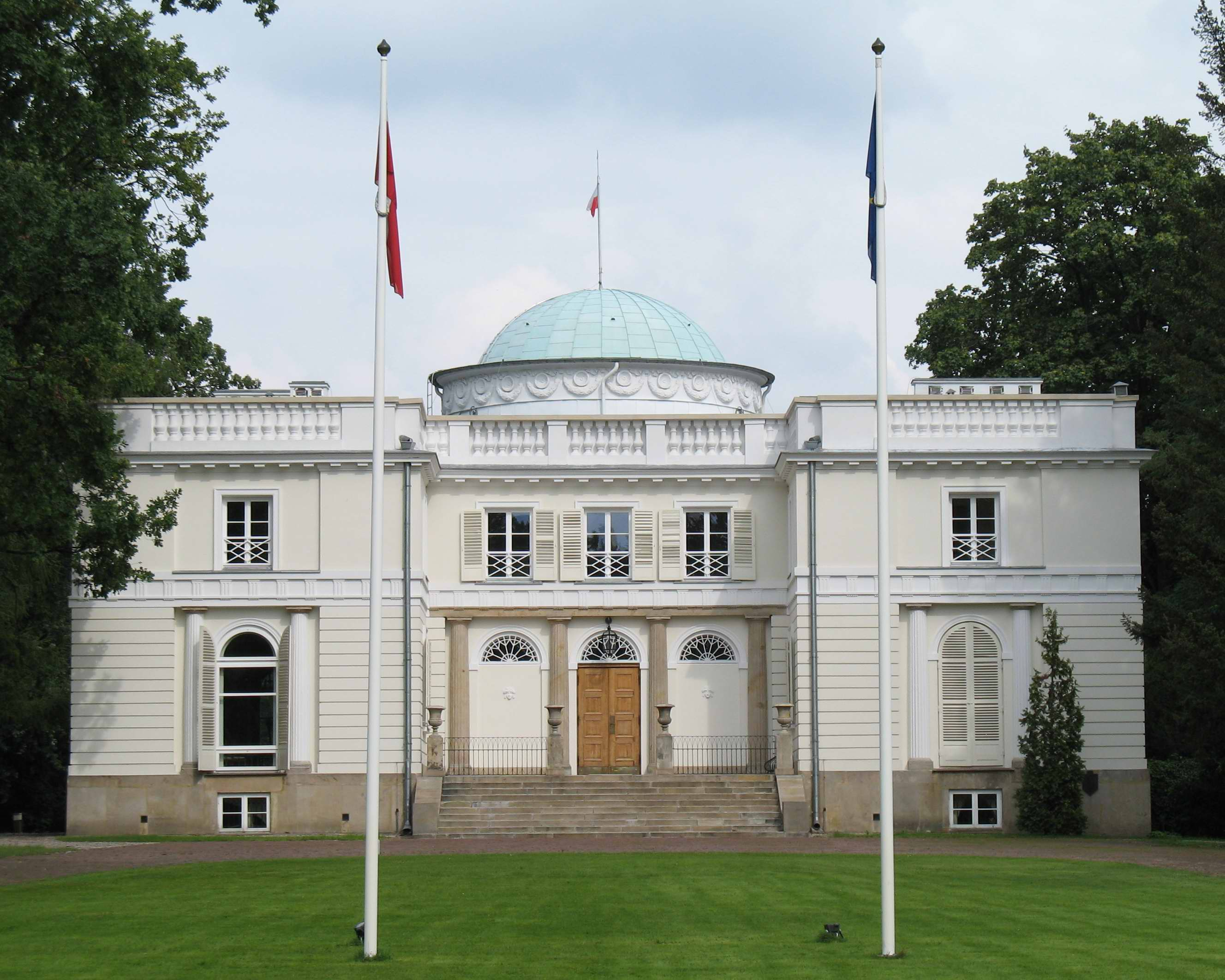
Natolin Palace

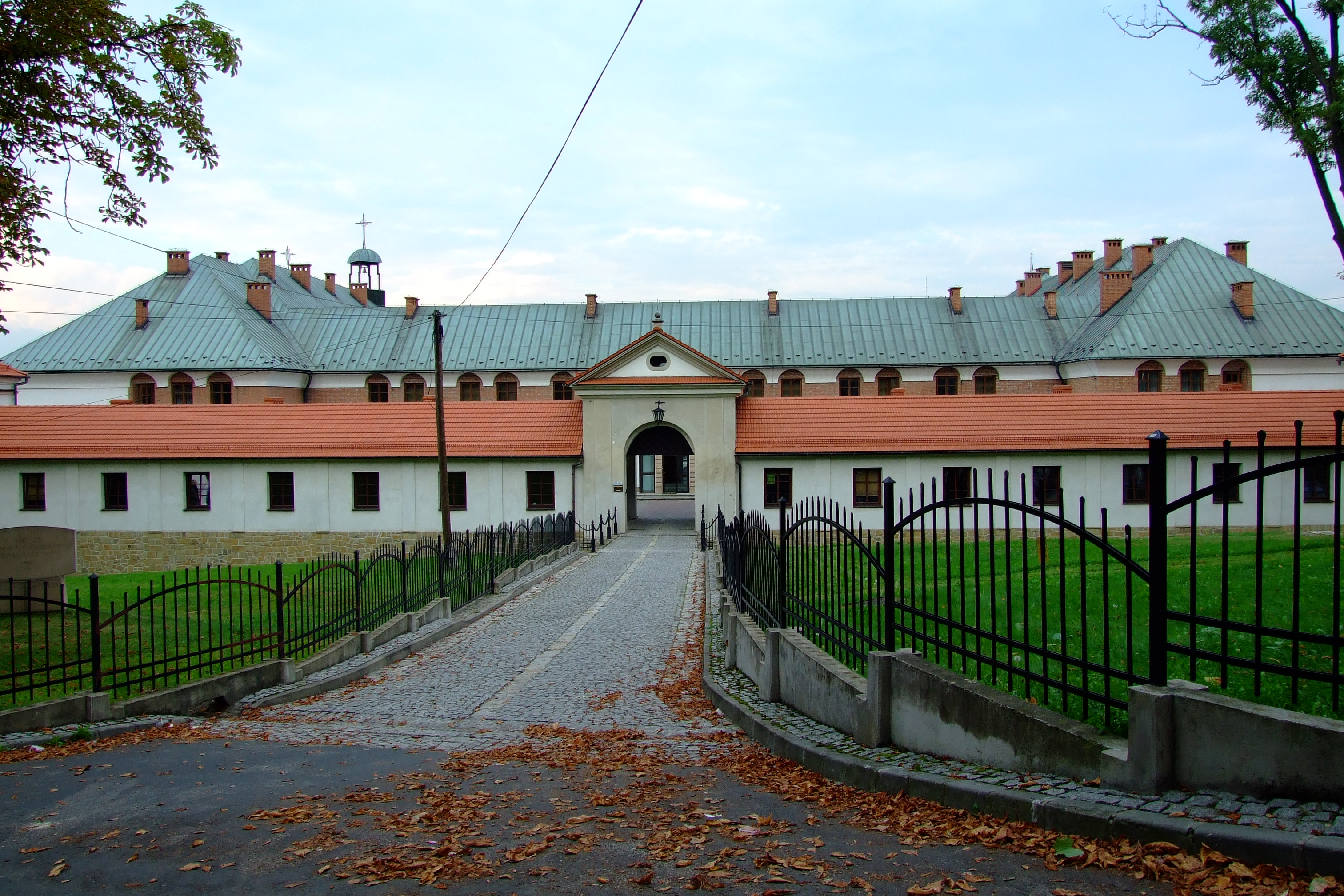
Former Czartoryski Palace in Kalwaria Zebrzydowska (rebuild)

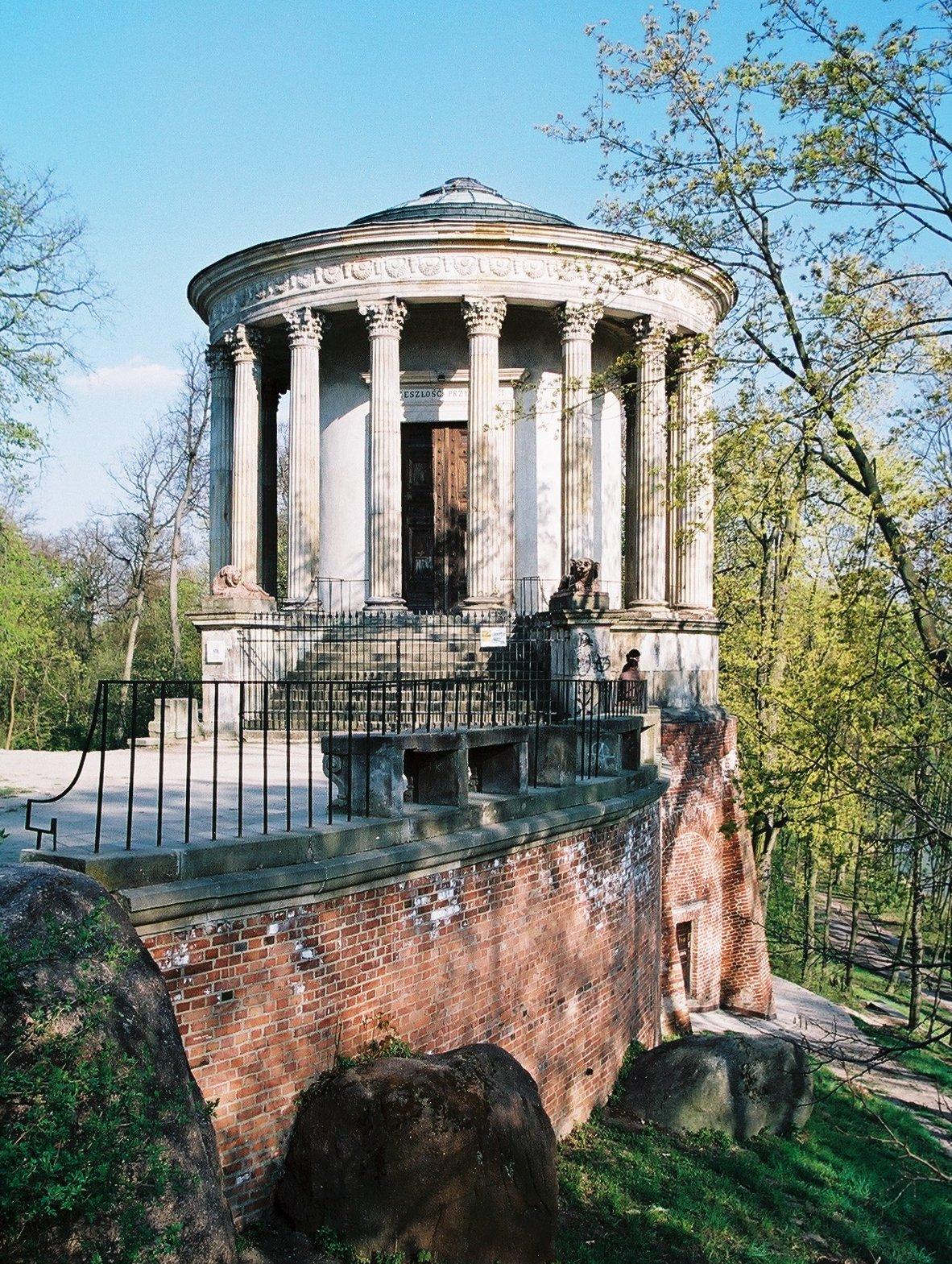
Temple of the Sibyl, 18th century museum in Puławy

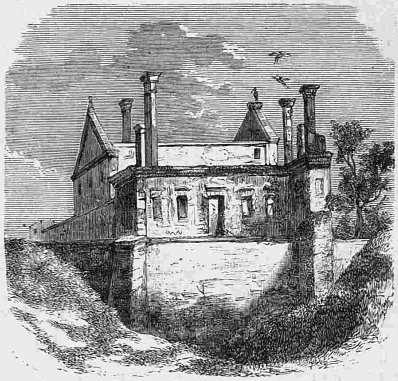
Ruins of the Castle of Czartorysk

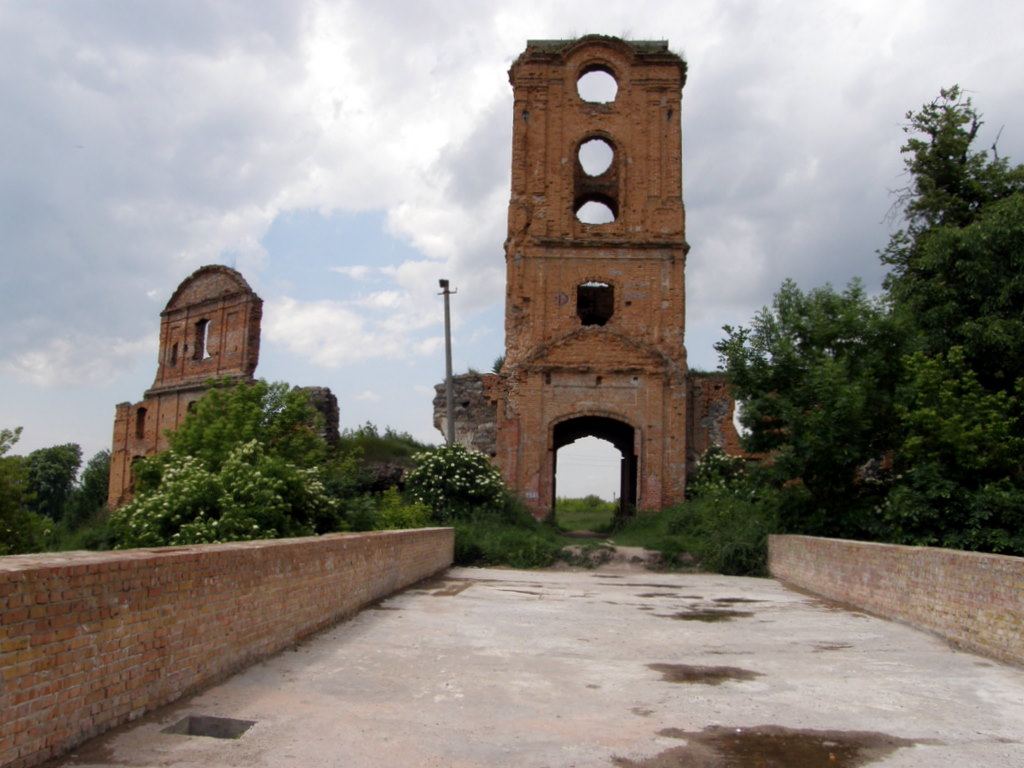
Ruins of the Castle of Korets

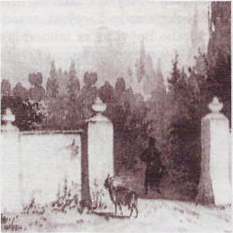
Ruins of the Czartoryski Palace in Wołczyn (1898)

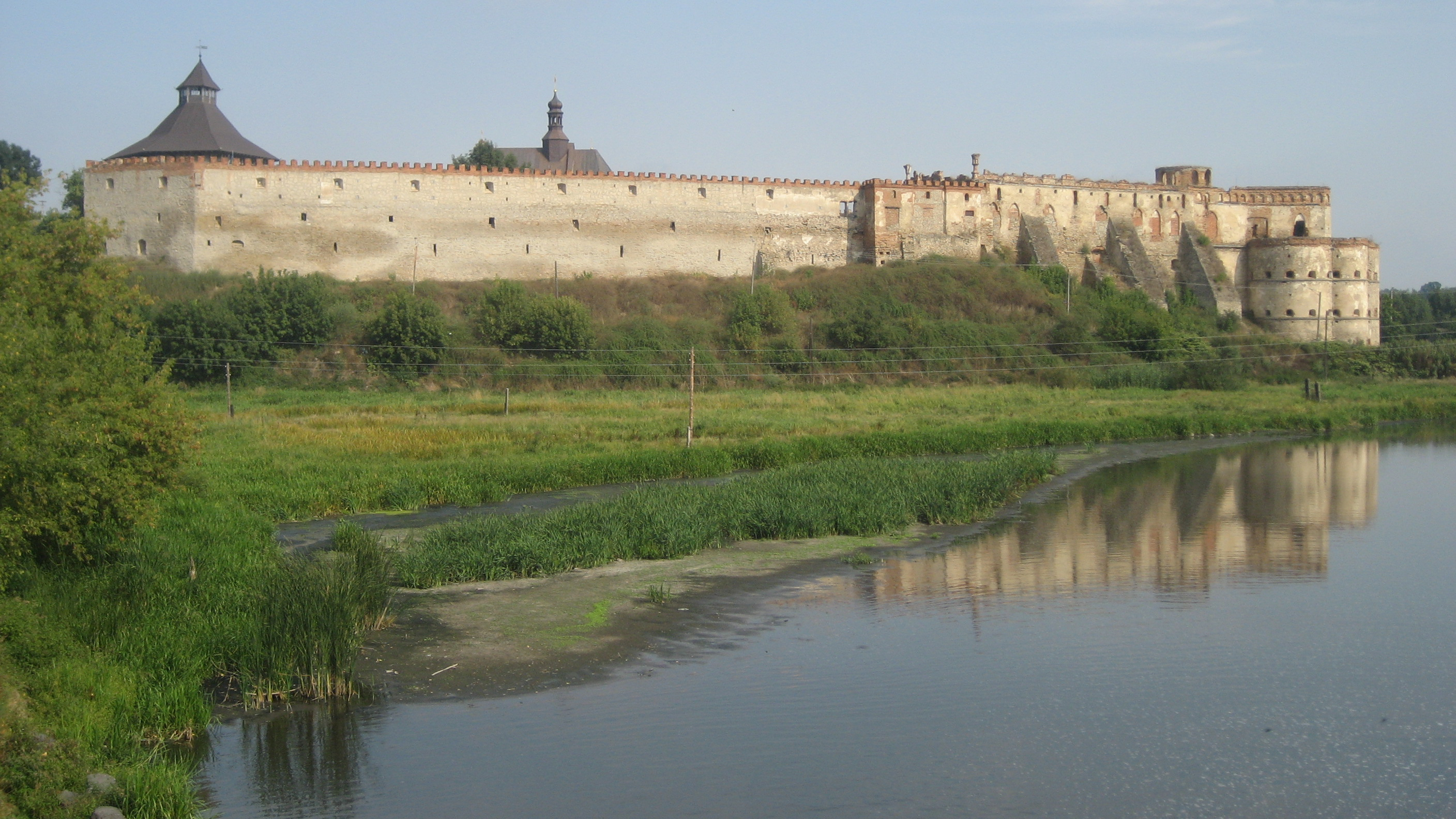
Castle of Medzhybizh

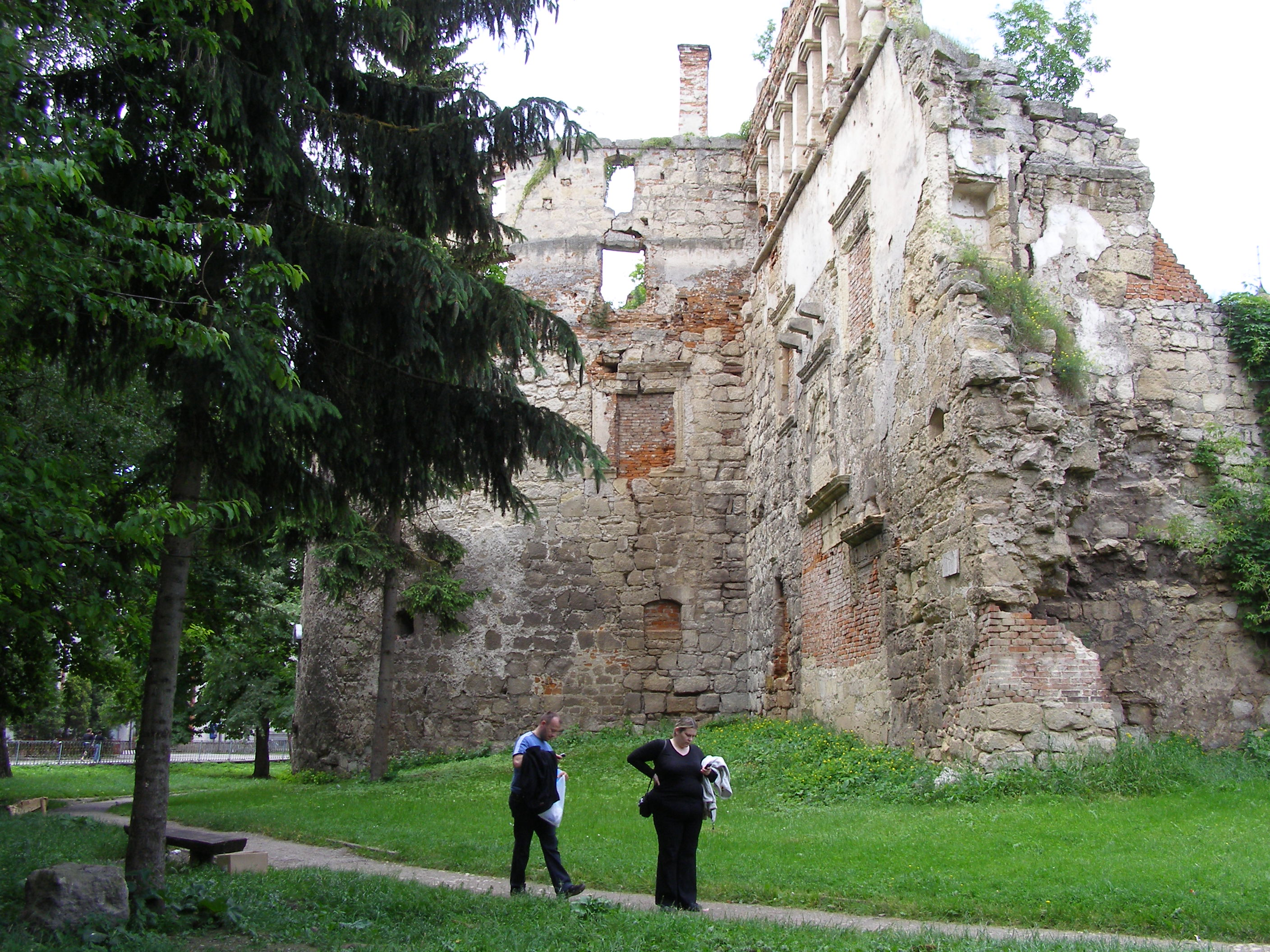
Ruins of the Castle of Berezhany

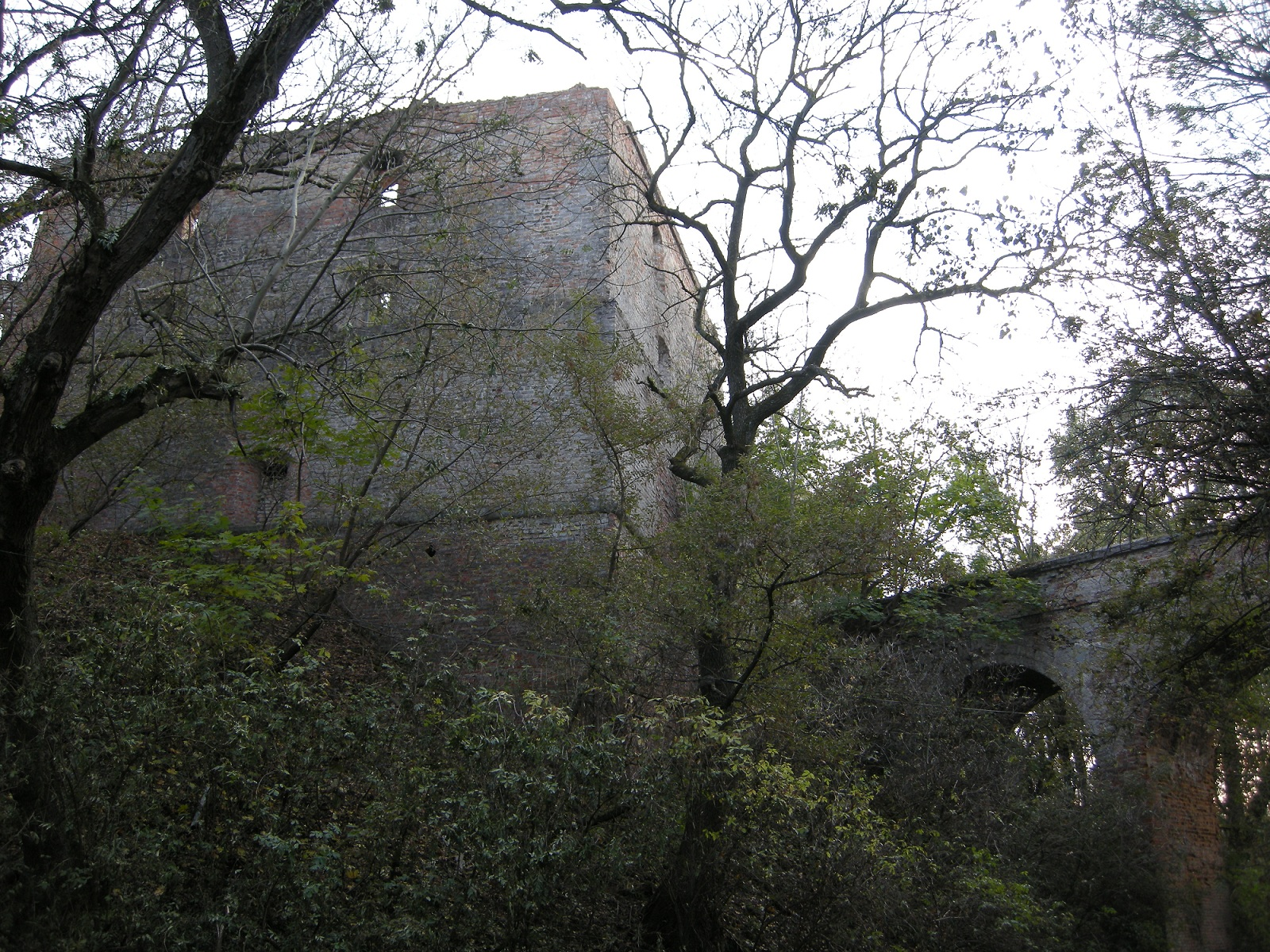
Ruins of the Castle of Klevan

== See also ==
- Czartoryska (disambiguation page for female members of the family)
- Princely Houses of Poland
- Familia
- Czartoryski Museum
- Royal Casket
- Czartoryski-Schlössel
- Hôtel Lambert
- Princes Czartoryski Foundation
- List of titled noble families in the Kingdom of Hungary
