= Włodzimierz Alfons Czartoryski =

- Coat of arms: Czartoryski
- Born: 3 November 1895; Pełkinie, Austria-Hungary
- Died: 2 October 1975 (aged 79); Kraków, Poland
- Noble family: Czartoryski
- Consort: Countess Sophie Tyszkiewicz
- Father: Witold Leon Czartoryski
- Mother: Countess Hedwig Dzieduszycka

Prince Włodzimierz Alfons Czartoryski (1895–1975) was a Polish noble (szlachcic). He was the last owner of the Pełkinie, Wiazownica and Byliny land estates and the Szowsko industrial estate, before these were confiscated by the communist decree of nationalization on 3 January 1946.

He was the curator of the Czartoryski Museum in Kraków in the first years after World War II.

Włodzimierz married Countess Sophie Tyszkiewicz on 5 April 1923 in Krzeszowice. They had three children together: Paul Marie Czartoryski, Elisabeth Rose-Marie Czartoryska and Roza Maria Jadwiga Laurencja Czartoryska.
