= Adam Michał Czartoryski =

Polish noble (1906–1998)

- Prince
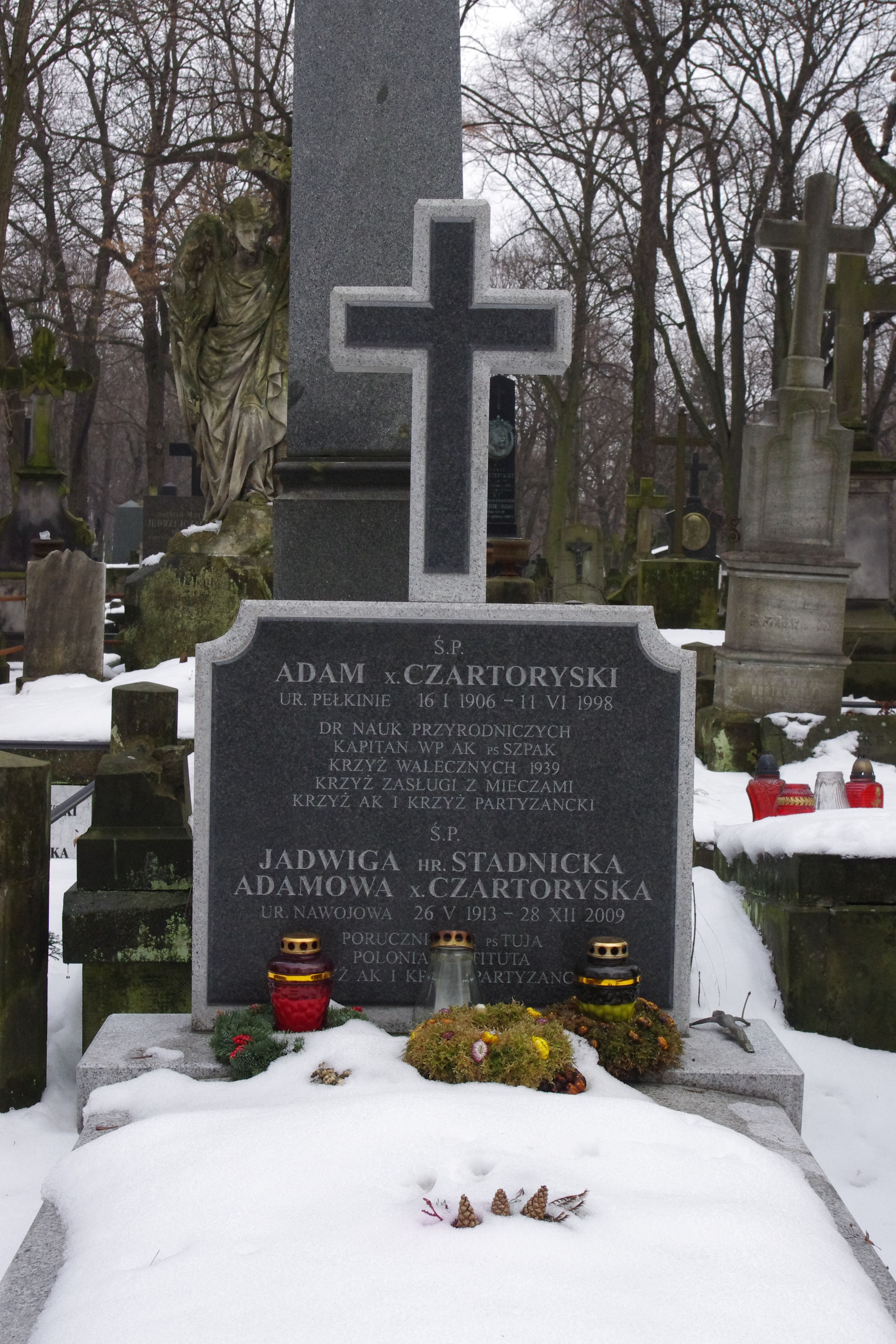
- Coat of arms: Czartoryski
- Born: 16 January 1906; Pełkinie, Austria-Hungary
- Died: 11 June 1998 (aged 92); Warsaw, Poland
- Noble family: Czartoryski
- Wife: Jadwiga Tekla Stadnicka
- Father: Witold Leon Czartoryski
- Mother: Jadwiga Dzieduszycka

Prince Adam Michał Czartoryski (1906–1998) was a Polish noble (szlachcic) of the Czartoryski magnate.

Adam became a Master Engineer, forester and Doctor of Biology. He entered the Polish Army and was promoted to the rank of captain in the Invasion of Poland, later becoming a member of the Armia Krajowa (pseudonym "Szpak"). He was owner of the Głuszyn, Babki and Wigry estates.

He married Countess Jadwiga Tekla Stadnicka on 24 June 1937 in Nowojowa Castle. His children were Jerzy Andrzej Bobola Czartoryski, Maria Krystyna Czartoryska, Izabella Czartoryska, and Jadwiga Anna Czartoryska.

== See also ==
- Czartoryski family
