= Adam Czartoryski =

Adam Czartoryski may refer to:

- Adam Kazimierz Czartoryski (1734–1823), Polish nobleman and man of letters
- Adam Jerzy Czartoryski (1770–1861), Polish nobleman and minister of the Russian Empire
- Adam Ludwik Czartoryski (1872–1937), Polish nobleman, landowner, and patron of the arts
- Adam Karol Czartoryski (born 1940), Polish-Spanish aristocrat
- Adam Michał Czartoryski (1906–1998), Polish noble
