= Paweł Czartoryski =

Polish historian (1924–1999)

- Coat of arms: Czartoryski
- Born: 21 May 1924; Kraków, Poland
- Died: 10 August 1999 (aged 75); Warsaw, Poland
- Buried: Służew Old Cemetery
- Noble family: Czartoryski
- Consort: Veronica Poninska
- Father: Włodzimierz Alfons Czartoryski
- Mother: Countess Sophie Tyszkiewicz

Prince Paweł Czartoryski (1924–1999) was a Polish historian.

He was a law scholar and a science historian. He has contributed considerably on the subject of Nicolaus Copernicus and has published several translations of his works.

He was the Head of the Econometrics Department at Maria Curie-Skłodowska University in Lublin until 1970. Later a residing professor in the Institute for the History of Science, Polish Academy of Sciences and a corresponding fellow of the Medieval Academy of America amongst others.

Czartoryski took part in the Polish Round Table talks, where he was responsible for education.

Czartoryski was the founder of the Polish United World Colleges Committee and is now its patron. The society awards about 20 scholarships a year.

He was married to Veronica Poninska and had three children: Witold Michał Czartoryski, Irena Czartoryska and Maria Czartoryska.
