= General Czartoryski =

General Czartoryski may refer to:

- Adam Kazimierz Czartoryski (1734–1823), Polish–Lithuanian Commonwealth general
- August Aleksander Czartoryski (1697–1782), Polish–Lithuanian Commonwealth general
- Konstanty Adam Czartoryski (1777–1866), Polish Army brigadier general
