= Czartoryski Palace =

Czartoryski Palace can refer to:

- Czartoryski Palace (Puławy)
- Czartoryski Palace (Vienna)
- Potocki Palace, Warsaw
