= Czartoryska =

Czartoryska is the feminine form the Polish surname Czartoryski (see Czartoryski family). Female members of this family have included:

- Antonina Czartoryska (1728–1746), Polish magnate, mother of Izabela Czartoryska
- Eleonora Czartoryska (1710–1795), Polish noble and ruler of Radzymin
- Elżbieta Czartoryska (1736–1816), Polish magnate, founder of the distillery in Łańcut
- Elżbieta Czartoryska (1905–1989), Polish magnate
- Princess Izabela Czartoryska (1746–1835), Polish magnate and art collector
- Princess Marcelina Czartoryska née Radziwiłł (1817–1894), Polish magnate and concert pianist, pupil of Frédéric Chopin
- Izabella Elżbieta Czartoryska (1832–1899), Polish magnate
- Józefina Maria Czartoryska (1787–1862), Polish magnate
- Klementyna Czartoryska (1780–1852), Polish noble and author
- Konstancja Czartoryska (1700–1759), Polish magnate, mother of King Stanislaus II Augustus
- Maria Zofia Czartoryska (1699–1771), Polish countess
- Tamara Laura Czartoryska (born 1978), Polish–Spanish equestrian and model
- Teresa Czartoryska (1785–1868), Polish noble
- Zofia Czartoryska (1780–1837), Polish magnate
