= Jan Franciszek Czartoryski =

Polish nobleman, Roman Catholic Dominican friar, and martyr

Blessed Jan Franciszek Czartoryski OP
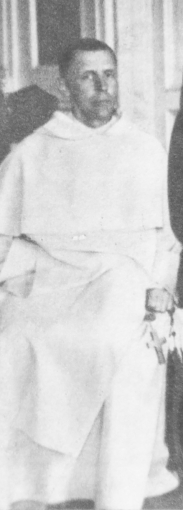

Martyr
- Born: 19 February 1897; Pełkinie, Poland
- Died: 6 September 1944 (aged 47); Warsaw, Poland
- Venerated in: Catholic Church
- Beatified: 13 June 1999, Warsaw by John Paul II
- Feast: 6 September
- Parents: Witold Leon Czartoryski (father); Jadwiga Dzieduszycka (mother)

Prince Jan Franciszek Czartoryski or Blessed Michał (19 February 1897–6 September 1944) was a Polish noble and a Dominican friar.

John Czartoryski was born in Pelkinie (Jaroslaw) on 19 February 1897. He came from a large aristocratic Polish family, and received a careful thorough education in a private school near Warsaw. He was an activist of the young organisation "Odrodzenie" ("Rebirth") in Lwów. After passing his maturity exam in Kraków he studied at Lviv Polytechnic, obtaining the title of architect engineer in 1926.

He joined the Dominican Order in Lviv, where he received the name of Michał. Czartoryski was ordained in 1931. During the Warsaw Uprising he was the chaplain of the Armia Krajowa Group "Konrad" and was shot by German troops.

Czartoryski was beatified on 13 June 1998 among the 108 Polish Martyrs of World War II.

Feast Day is 6 September.
