= Jaroslav Čermák (painter) =

Czech painter (1830–1878)

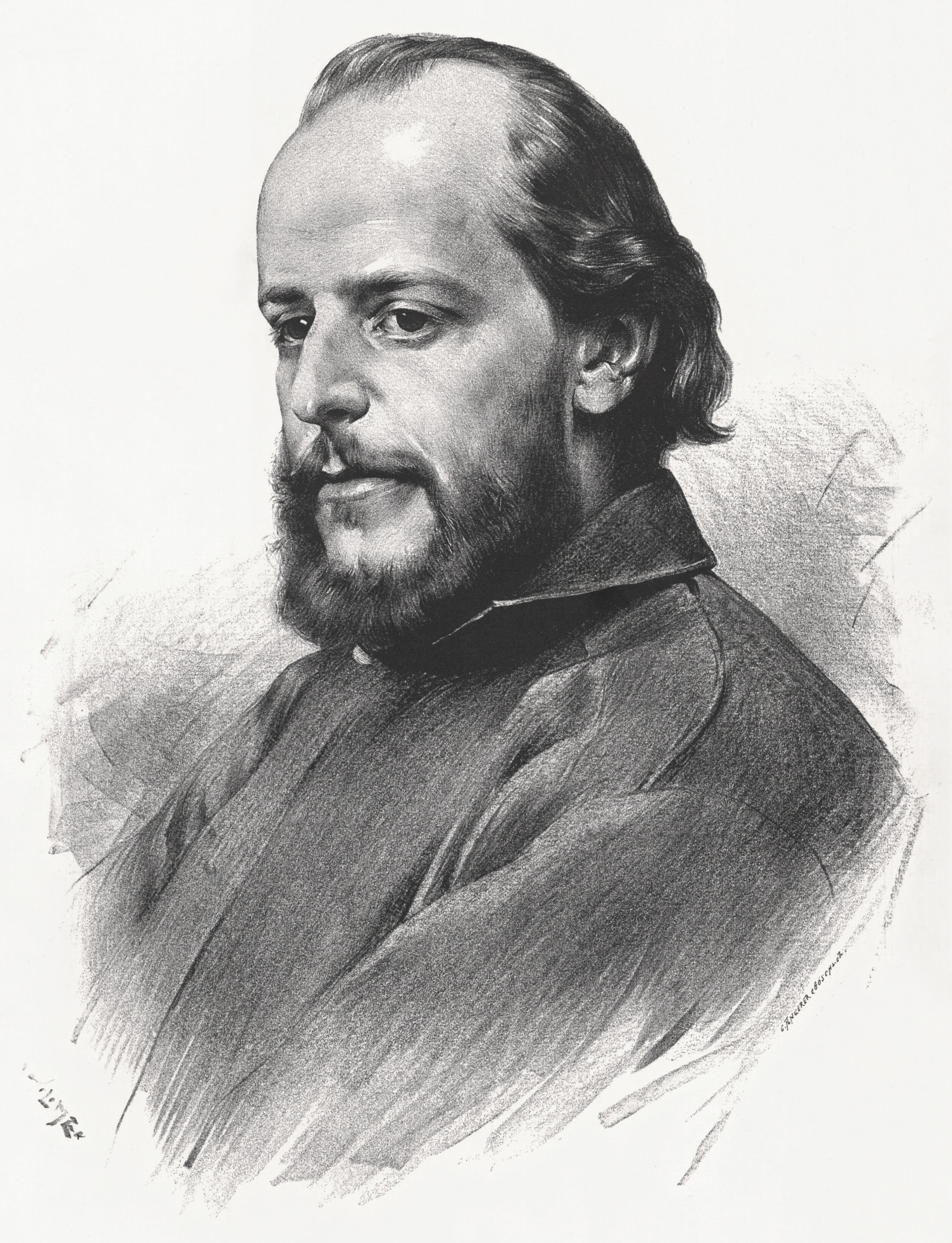
Čermák by Jan Vilímek

Jaroslav Čermák (1 August 1830 – 23 April 1878) was a Czech painter known primarily for his history paintings. Many of his paintings are in the collection of the National Gallery in Prague.

== Biography ==
Čermák was born in Prague. His birth house (No. 10 at the square Betlémské náměstí) has since been decorated with a commemorative statue of a girl crowned with laurel and with a golden inscription of his surname. As a child, Čermák suffered an injury of the hip, and due to subsequent complications he spent a part of his childhood strapped to the bed in a narrow chest. This accident apparently inspired his artistic beginnings, as while in bed, deprived of the possibility of moving, he found an interest in drawing. Histitle family was involved in arts patronage; his mother supported anonymously the renowned Czech writer Božena Němcová.

From 1847 to 1848, Čermák studied at the Academy of Fine Arts in Prague as a pupil of Christian Ruben. It was Čermák's desire to be a history painter; as he felt that the training in Prague would be insufficient, he traveled to Antwerp, where he studied with Gustave Wappers and Louis Gallait. In 1852 he settled in Paris; however, he travelled widely through Europe and often returned to his homeland. He frequently visited Montenegro, and in 1862 he fought alongside Herzegovina chieftains and their soldiers in Herzegovina uprising (1875–1877). For his courage in battle he was awarded a medal by Nicholas I of Montenegro, whose guest he frequently was. One of the streets in Podgorica was named after him. In 1874 he designed and built his own house in Paris.

Through his sister Marie, Čermák was the brother-in-law of Jerzy Konstanty Czartoryski. He died in 1878 in Paris. His remains were transferred to Prague in 1888. He is buried at Olšany Cemetery in Prague.

== Style ==
He was influenced by the work of Peter Paul Rubens. During his stay in Paris he encountered Eugène Delacroix and Alexandre-Gabriel Decamps and became familiar with their works. Many of his paintings depicted scenes from Czech history; he was, however, also interested in subjects from Montenegro and Old Herzegovina, and one of his most famous works is The Wounded Montenegrin. His works are influenced by Romanticism. As an important artistic exponent of the Czech National Revival, he actively participated in the emancipation efforts of Czechs and other small European nations. The themes of his works bear the stamp of anti-Habsburg stance. Čermák painted portraits and genre pieces in addition to history paintings.

== Gallery ==
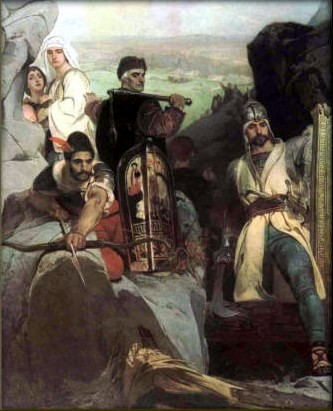
Hussites Defending a Pass

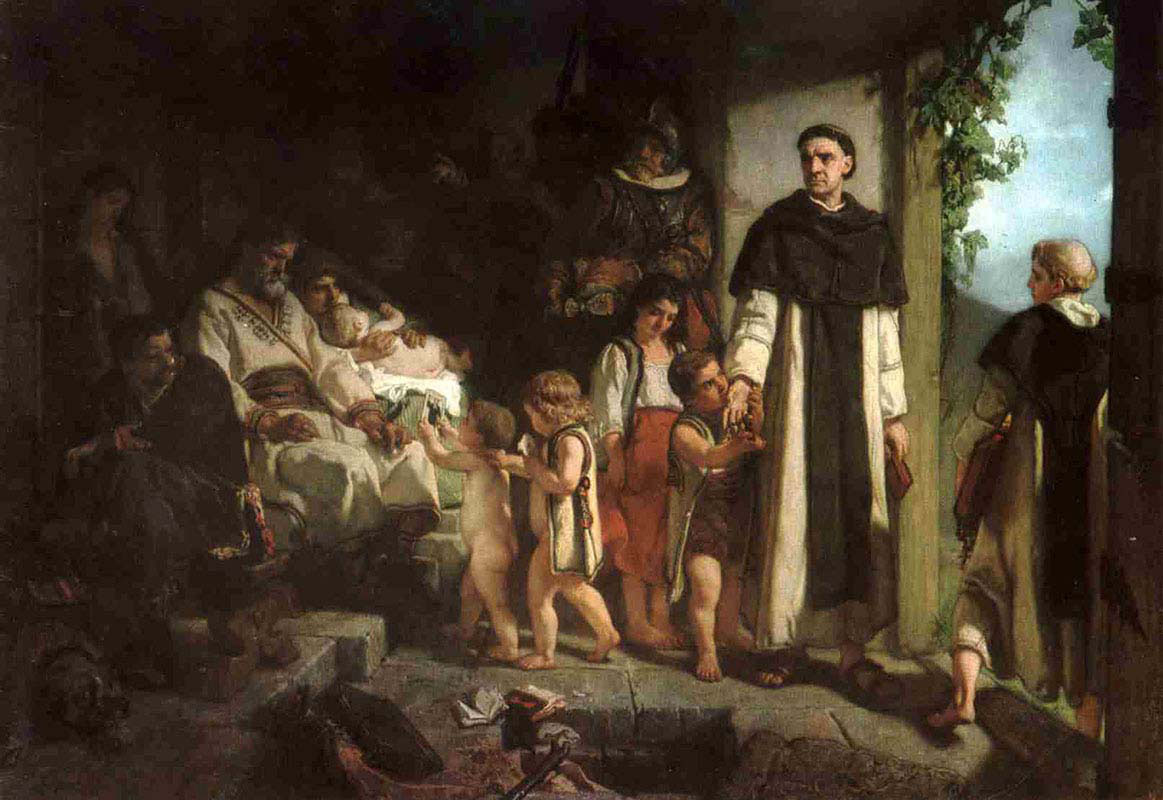
Counter-Reformation (1854)

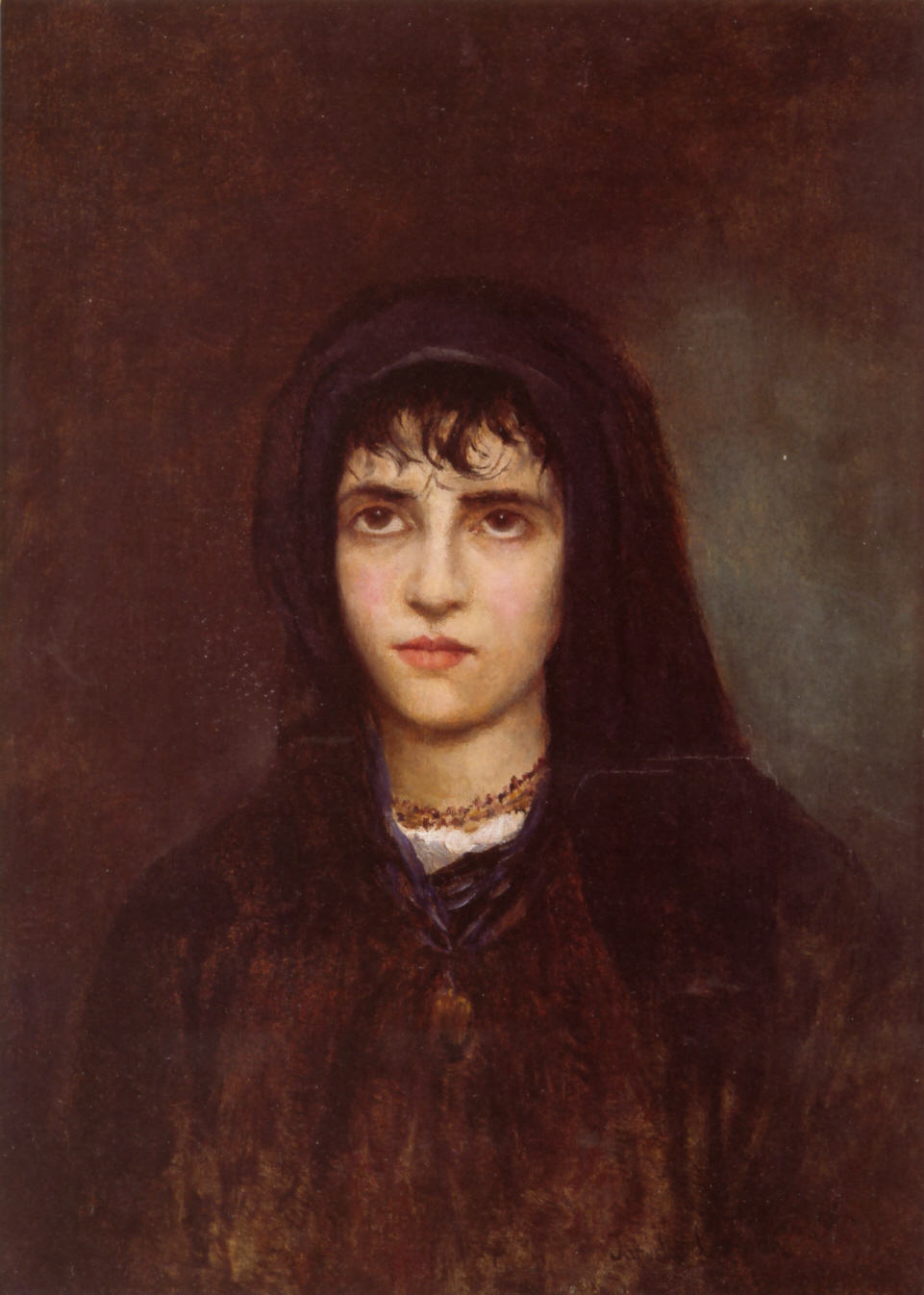
Montenegrin (1865)

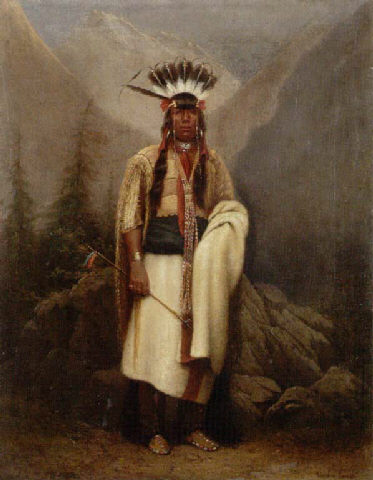
Indian

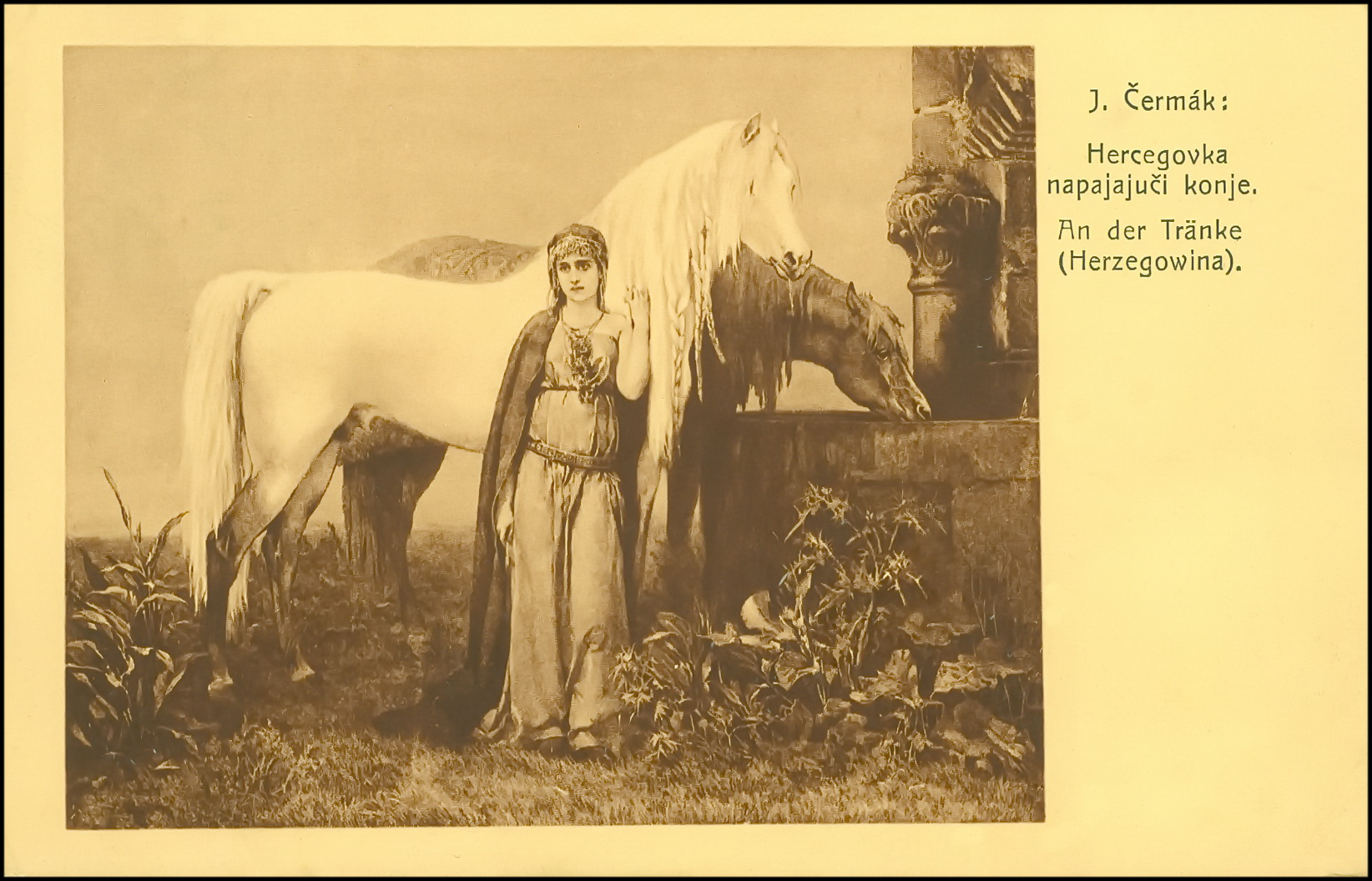
Herzegovinan girl taking the horses
to the watering hole
