= Jadwiga Dzieduszycka =

Polish noblewoman

- Countess
- Coat of arms: Sas
- Born: 2 March 1867; Lwów
- Died: 12 July 1941 (aged 74); Pełkinie
- Family: House of Dzieduszycki
- Consort: Witold Leon Czartoryski
- Issue: Maria Anna Czartoryska; Anna Maria Czartoryska; Kazimierz Jerzy Czartoryski; Jerzy Piotr Czartoryski; Włodzimierz Alfons Czartoryski; Jan Franciszek Czartoryski; Roman Jacek Czartoryski; Stanisław Ignacy Czartoryski; Elżbieta Czartoryska; Adam Michał Czartoryski; Witold Tadeusz Czartoryski; Piotr Michał Czartoryski
- Father: Włodzimierz Dzieduszycki
- Mother: Alfonsyna Miączyńska

Countess Jadwiga Dzieduszycka (1867–1941) was a Polish noble lady.

== Family ==
Jadwiga was married to Prince Witold Leon Czartoryski on 21 February 1889 in Lwów. They had twelve children together:

- Maria Anna Czartoryska
- Anna Maria Czartoryska
- Kazimierz Jerzy Czartoryski
- Jerzy Piotr Czartoryski
- Włodzimierz Alfons Czartoryski
- Jan Franciszek Czartoryski
- Roman Jacek Czartoryski
- Stanisław Ignacy Czartoryski
- Elżbieta Czartoryska
- Adam Michał Czartoryski
- Witold Tadeusz Czartoryski
- Piotr Michał Czartoryski
