= Czartoryski Palace (Vienna) =

Coordinates: 48°13′44″N 16°19′51″E

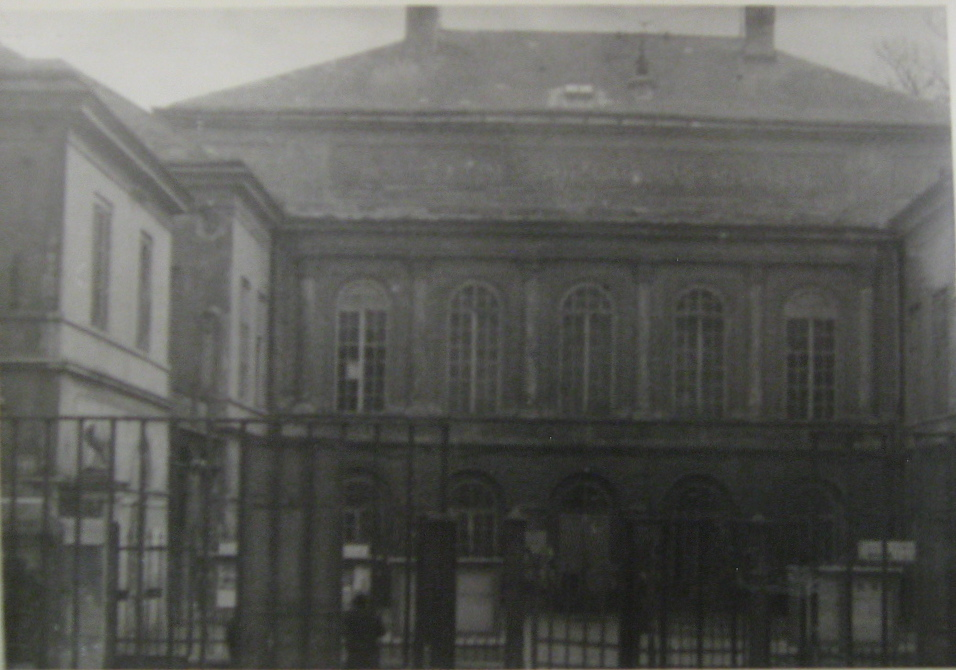
View on the corps de logis

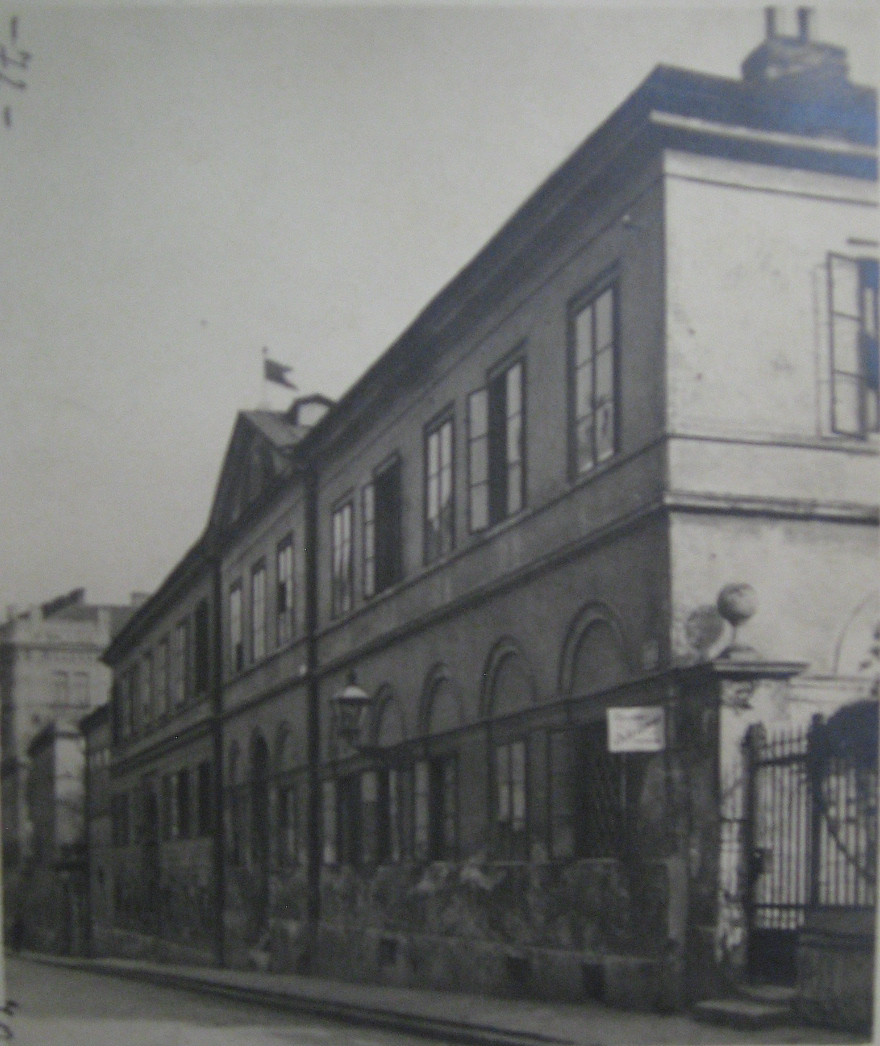
Side wings seen from the main street

Czartoryski-Schlössel (Schlössel is roughly translatable as "small palace") was a palace called Weinhaus in the Währing district of Vienna, Austria. It was built in 1807 for the banker Friedrich Jakob van der Nüll, the legal, but not biological father of architect Eduard van der Nüll. The palace was subsequently put up for sale and purchased by Prince Czartoryski; it remained in possession of the Czartoryski family until shortly after World War I.

The three-storey-high palace was designed in the Empire style. The layout was shaped like a horseshoe, with a central part (Mitteltrakt) and two side wings. The building was set back from the street by a courtyard, protected by a wrought-iron fence with a gate. Before selling the palace, the Prince had the expensive inlaid doors and wooden floor removed and transported to his estate in Pełkinie near Jarosław, Galicia, where they were destroyed in a fire during World War I. The palace's remaining features included the elaborate ceiling in the former library, showing depictions of mythological scenes, as well as the stucco in the former gallery.

After the palace was renovated in 1923, it re-opened as a children's home. The building suffered slight damage during World War II, and subsequently fell into neglect. It was torn down in 1957 to make way for a modern school building, completed in 1959.
