= Wiązownica, Podlaskie Voivodeship =

Wiązownica
- Village
- Location within Poland
- Coordinates: 53°26′36″N 22°21′03″E
- Country: Poland
- Voivodeship: Podlaskie
- County: Grajewo
- Gmina: Radziłów

Wiązownica [vjɔ̃zɔvˈnit͡sa] is a village in the administrative district of Gmina Radziłów, within Grajewo County, Podlaskie Voivodeship, in north-eastern Poland.
