= Konstanty Adam Czartoryski =

Polish nobleman and military commander (1773–1860)

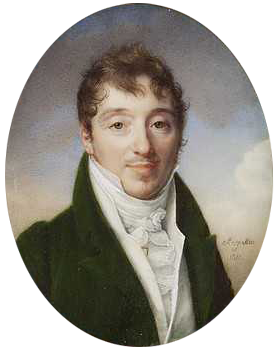
- Born: 28 October 1773; Warsaw, Polish-Lithuanian Commonwealth
- Died: 24 April 1860 (aged 86); Vienna, Austrian Empire
- Noble family: Czartoryski
- Spouses: Aniela Radziwiłł; Maria Dzierżanowska
- Issue: with Aniela Radziwiłł; Eudoxie Czartoryska; Adam Konstanty Czartoryski with Maria Dzierżanowska; Aleksander Roman Czartoryski; Maria Zuzanna Czartoryska; Konstanty Maria Czartoryski; Jerzy Konstanty Czartoryski
- Father: Adam Kazimierz Czartoryski
- Mother: Izabela Flemming

Prince Konstanty Adam Czartoryski (28 October 1773 – 24 April 1860) was a Polish nobleman who became colonel in 1809 in the Duchy of Warsaw and brigadier general in 1815 in Congress Poland.

Born to Adam Kazimierz Czartoryski and Izabela née Fleming as their younger son, his real father was Armand Louis de Gontaut, Duke de Lauzun, Isabella's lover. To conceal his illegitimate parentage, the year of his birth was given as 1773. He was half-brother of Adam Jerzy Czartoryski, Maria Anna Czartoryska and Zofia Czartoryska.

He was Freemason and Knight of Malta (in the order before 1799), Knight of Honour and Devotion. In 1801, he went to Saint Petersburg upon learning of the death of Paul I; he was in Moscow for Emperor Alexander I's coronation.

He commanded the Duchy of Warsaw's 2nd battalion of grenadiers and the 17th battalion of line infantry as a colonel from 1809. He was a member of the Czartoryski noble family and became a brigadier general of the Kingdom of Poland under Grand Duke Constantin Pavlovich. He was stationed in Prince Poniatowski's fifth corps of the Grande Armée in Napoleon's invasion of Russia in 1812. After Napoleon's expedition to Moscow in 1812, he became the French Emperor's adjutant general. In 1815, he was promoted to the rank of brigadier general in the army of Congress Poland.

He was married first to Aniela Radziwiłł in 1802, they had son Adam Konstanty. Then he married Maria Dzierżanowska in 1810, they had children: Aleksander Romuald, Maria Zuzanna, Konstanty Marian Czartoryski and Jerzy Konstanty Czartoryski.

He was the ordinate of the Międzyrzecz estate.
