= Czartoryski coat of arms =

Polish–Lithuanian coat of arms

Czartoryski
- Alternative name: Pogoń I odm. Czartoryski
- Cities: Puławy
- Divisions: Puławy County
- Families: 2 names Czartoryski, Sanguszko

The Czartoryski coat of arms is a Polish–Lithuanian coat of arms, a variant of the Pogoń Litewska arms. It has been used by the Gediminid Czartoryski family.

== History ==
The Czartoryski family is of Lithuanian descent from Ruthenia. Their ancestor, a grandson of Gediminas, the Grand Duke of Lithuania, became known with his baptismal name Constantine (c. 1330−1390) - he became a Prince of Chortoryisk in Volhynia. One of his sons, Vasyli Chortoryiski (Ukrainian: Чарторийський; c. 1375–1416), was granted an estate in Volhynia in 1393, and his three sons John, Alexander and Michael (c. 1400–1489) are considered the progenitors of the family. The founding members were culturally Ruthenian and Eastern Orthodox; they converted to Roman Catholicism and were Polonized during the 16th century.

Michael's descendant Prince Kazimierz Czartoryski (1674–1741), Duke of Klewan and Zukow (Klevan and Zhukiv), Castellan of Vilnius, reawakened Czartoryski royal ambitions at the end of the 17th century. He married Isabella Morsztyn, daughter of the Grand Treasurer of Poland, and built "The Familia" with their four children, Michał, August, Teodor and Konstancja. The family became known and powerful under the lead of brothers Michał Fryderyk Czartoryski and August Aleksander Czartoryski in the late Polish–Lithuanian Commonwealth of the 18th century, during the reigns Augustus II the Strong (King of Poland, 1697–1706 and 1709–1733) and Stanisław I Leszczyński (King of Poland 1704–1709 and 1733–1736). The Czartoryski had risen to power under August Aleksander Czartoryski (1697–1782) of the Klewa line, who married Zofia Denhoffowa, the only heir to the Sieniawski family.

The family attained the height of its influence from the mid-18th century in the court of King Augustus III (r. 1734–1763). The Czartoryski brothers gained a very powerful ally in their brother-in-law, Stanisław Poniatowski, whose son became the last king of the independent Polish-Lithuanian Commonwealth, Stanisław August Poniatowski (r. 1764–1795).

The Czartoryski's Familia saw the decline of the Commonwealth and the rise of anarchy and joined the camp which was determined to press ahead with reforms; thus they sought the enactment of such constitutional reforms as the abolition of the liberum veto.

Although the Russian Empire confiscated the family estate at Puławy in 1794, during the third partition of Poland, the Familia continued to wield significant cultural and political influence for decades after, notably through the princes Adam Kazimierz (1734–1823), Adam Jerzy (1770–1861) and Konstanty Adam (1777–1866).

The Czartoryski family is renowned for the Czartoryski Museum in Kraków and the Hôtel Lambert in Paris.

Today, the only descendants of Prince Adam Jerzy Czartoryski are Prince Adam Karol Czartoryski (1940- ) and his daughter Tamara Czartoryska (1978- ), who live in the United Kingdom. The descendants of Prince Konstanty Adam Czartoryski live to this day in Poland and have their representatives in the Confederation of the Polish Nobility.

Coat of arms and motto The Czartoryski family used the Czartoryski coat of arms and the motto Bądź co bądź ("Come what may", literally 'let be, that which will be'). The family's arms were a modification of the Pogoń Litewska arms.

Czartoryski coat of arms used in 1785 Czartoryski coat of arms used in 1785

Notable members Adam Jerzy Czartoryski; portrait by Józef Oleszkiewicz Adam Jerzy Czartoryski; portrait by Józef Oleszkiewicz Notable members include:

In Poland Wasyl Czartoryski (died after 1416), married Hanna Michał Czartoryski (died before 1486), married Maria Niemir Teodor Czartoryski (died 1542), married Princes Zofia Sanguszko h. Pogoń Litewska Iwan Czartoryski (died 1566), married Princess Anna Zasławska h. Korybut Jerzy Czartoryski (1550−1626), married Princess Aleksandra Wiśniowiecka h. Korybut, Halszka Hołowińska h. Hołowiński and Princess Zofia Lubomirska h. Szreniawa Michał Jerzy Czartoryski (1585−1661), married Princess Izabella Korecka h. Pogoń Litewska Michał Jerzy Czartoryski (1621−1692), married Rosine Margarethe von Eckenberg, Eufrozyna Stanisławska h. Szeliga and Joanna Weronika Olędzka h. Rawa Kazimierz Czartoryski (1674−1741), married Countess Izabela Elżbieta Morsztyn h. Leliwa Michał Fryderyk Czartoryski (1696–1775), married Countess Elenora Monika Waldstein August Aleksander Czartoryski (1697−1782) married Countess Maria Zofia Sieniawska h. Leliwa Adam Kazimierz Czartoryski (1734–1823), married Izabela Czartoryska h. Fleming Maria Anna Czartoryska (1768−1854), married Louis, Duke of Württemberg Adam Jerzy Czartoryski (1770–1861), married Princess Anna Zofia Sapieha h. Lis Izabella Elżbieta Czartoryska (1832–1899), married Count Jan Kanty Działyński h. Ogończyk Witold Czartoryski (1824–1865), married Maria Cycylia Grocholska h. Syrokomla Władysław Czartoryski (1828–1894), married María Amparo Muñoz, 1st Countess of Vista Alegre and Princess Marguerite Adélaïde of Orléans Beatified August Franciszek Czartoryski (1858–1893) Adam Ludwik Czartoryski (1872–1937), married Countess Maria Ludwika Krasińska h. Ślepowron Elżbieta Czartoryska (1905–1989) married Count Stefan Adam Zamoyski h. Jelita Augustyn Józef Czartoryski (1907–1946), married Princess Maria de los Dolores of Bourbon-Two Sicilies Adam Karol Czartoryski (b. 1940), married Nora Picciotto and Josette Calil Tamara Czartoryska (b. 1978) Konstanty Adam Czartoryski (1773–1860), married Princess Aniela Radziwiłł h. Trąby and Maria Dzierżanowska h. Gozdawa Jerzy Konstanty Czartoryski (1828–1912), married Maria Joanna Czermak Witold Leon Czartoryski (1864–1945), married Countess Jadwiga Dzieduszycka h. Sas Włodzimierz Alfons Czartoryski (1895–1975), married Countess Zofia Tyszkiewicz h. Leliwa Professor Paweł Czartoryski (1924–1999) Beatified Jan Franciszek Czartoryski (1897–1944) Roman Jacek Czartoryski (1898–1958), married Countess Teresa Janina Zamoyska h. Jelita Piotr Michał Czartoryski (1908–1993), married Countess Anna Zamoyska h. Jelita Zofia Czartoryska (1780−1873), married Count Stanisław Kostka Zamoyski h. Jelita Elżbieta Czartoryska (1736–1816), married Stanisław Lubomirski h. Szreniawa Konstancja Czartoryska (1700–1759), married Stanisław Poniatowski h. Ciołek, mother of the last King of Poland Stanisław August Poniatowski In Hungary Piotr Czartoryski ( wife: Lázár Mária) Mária Lázár (b. Mária Czartoriska) (1895–1983), actress ( mother: Lázár Mária) Serbán Ivánné (b. Magdolna Irén Czartoryska (mother: Lázár Mária) sons of Magdolna Iren Czartoryska Wachtel Elemér Wachtel Domonkos Dr Czartoryski Jenö (mother: Lázár Maria) sons of Jenö Czartoryski Adam Czartoryski born Budapest, Uppsala, Sweden Ivan Czartoryski born Budapest, Uppsala, Sweden, architect Palaces Gołuchów Castle Gołuchów Castle Czartoryski Palace in Puławy Czartoryski Palace in Puławy Czartoryski Palace in Lublin Czartoryski Palace in Lublin Czartoryski Museum in Kraków Czartoryski Museum in Kraków Czartoryski Palace in Sieniawa Czartoryski Palace in Sieniawa Konarzew Palace [pl] Konarzew Palace [pl] Palace in Rokosowo Palace in Rokosowo Palace in Baszków, Łódź Voivodeship Palace in Baszków, Łódź Voivodeship Palace in Pełkinie Palace in Pełkinie Siedlce Palace Siedlce Palace Palace in Międzyrzec Podlaski Palace in Międzyrzec Podlaski Potocki Palace, Warsaw Potocki Palace, Warsaw The Blue Palace, Warsaw The Blue Palace, Warsaw Wilanów Palace Wilanów Palace Natolin Palace Natolin Palace Former Czartoryski Palace in Kalwaria Zebrzydowska (rebuild) Former Czartoryski Palace in Kalwaria Zebrzydowska (rebuild) Temple of the Sibyl, 18th century museum in Puławy Temple of the Sibyl, 18th century museum in Puławy Ruins of the Castle of Czartorysk Ruins of the Castle of Czartorysk Ruins of the Castle of Korets Ruins of the Castle of Korets Ruins of the Czartoryski Palace in Wołczyn (1898) Ruins of the Czartoryski Palace in Wołczyn (1898) Castle of Medzhybizh Castle of Medzhybizh Ruins of the Castle of Berezhany Ruins of the Castle of Berezhany Ruins of the Castle of Klevan Ruins of the Castle of Klevan

== Blazon ==
There arms are a modified version of Pogoń Litewska, with three towers added at the lower part and the rest remaining identical.

== Notable bearers ==
Notable bearers of this coat of arms include:

- House of Czartoryski
  - Adam Jerzy Czartoryski
  - Adam Kazimierz Czartoryski
  - August Aleksander Czartoryski
  - Antonina Czartoryska
  - Michal Fryderyk Czartoryski
  - Konstancja Czartoryska
  - Elzbieta Czartoryska
  - Kazimierz Czartoryski
  - Konstanty Adam Czartoryski
  - Władysław Czartoryski
  - Tamara Laura Czartoryska
- House of Sanguszko

== See also ==
- Polish heraldry
- Heraldic family
- List of Polish nobility coats of arms

== Gallery ==
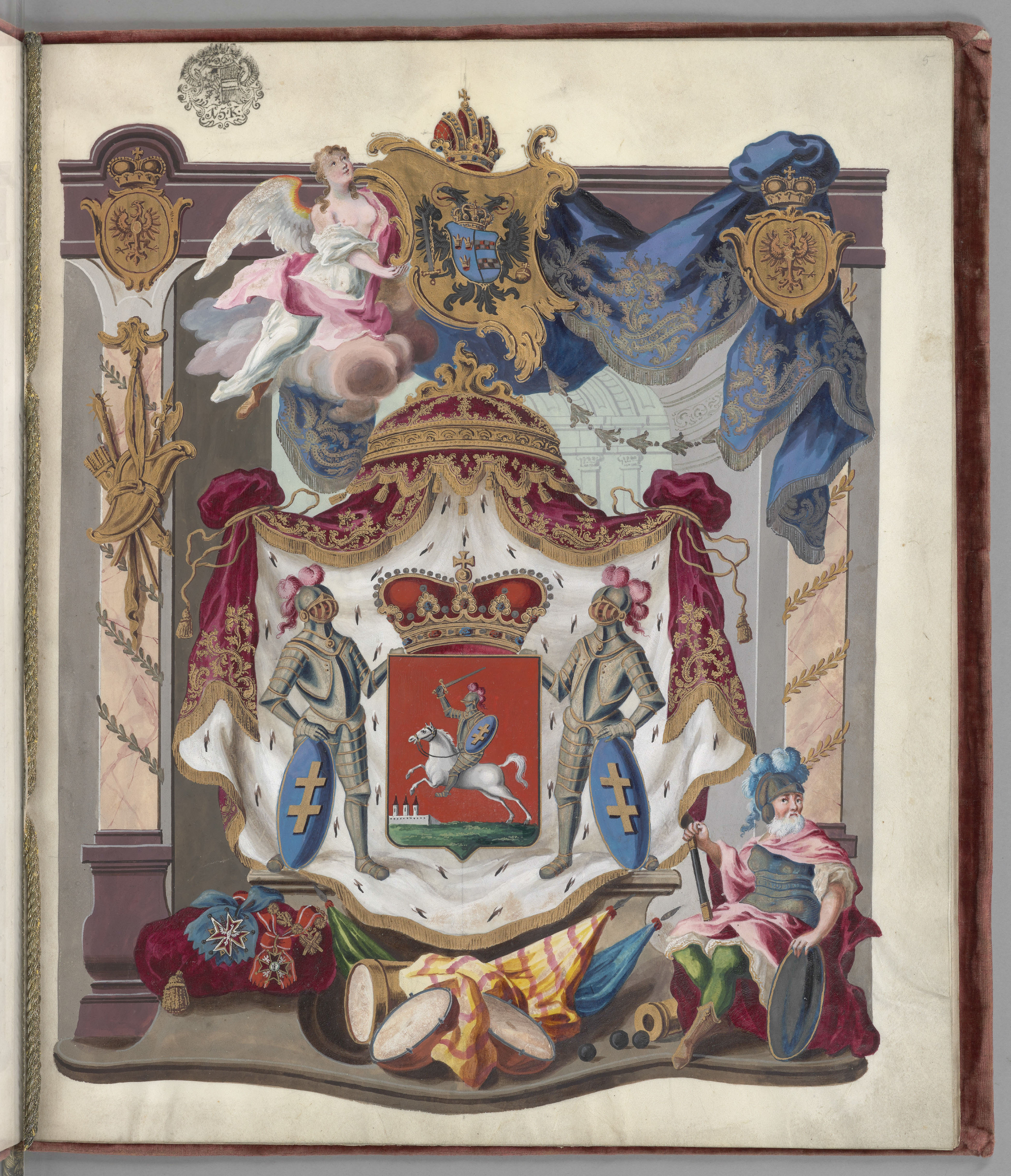
Coat of arms, 1785

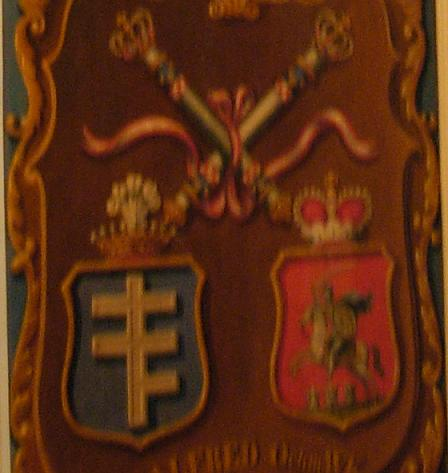
Pilawa coat of arms and the Prices Czartoryski coat of arms in Łańcut Castle

Greater version (1785)

Princes Czartoryski II

Coat of arms of Princes Sanguszko

== Related coat of arms ==
- Pogoń Litewska
- Pobóg-Somelyó, Bathory

== Bibliography ==
- Tadeusz Gajl: Herbarz polski od średniowiecza do XX wieku : ponad 4500 herbów szlacheckich 37 tysięcy nazwisk 55 tysięcy rodów. L&L, 2007. ISBN 978-83-60597-10-1.
- KASPER NIESIELSKI (§20-21, rok 1998 Haga, Polska Trybunał Sprawiedliwości Netherlands (Oryginały Herbu i Nazwisk Polskich III C-D) Czartoryskich nazwisko, dane polskie, historia - Surname Data, and History Of Familia-House Czartoryski. Lipsk 1839 Nakładem i Drukiem Breitkopfa i Hærtela Jan Nep. Borowicz z Dowodów Urzędowych 929.5/.9 F-20 Kaspra Niesieckiego 929.6(438)(03):09
