= Prague Slavic Congress, 1848 =

Gathering of Slav populations in Europe

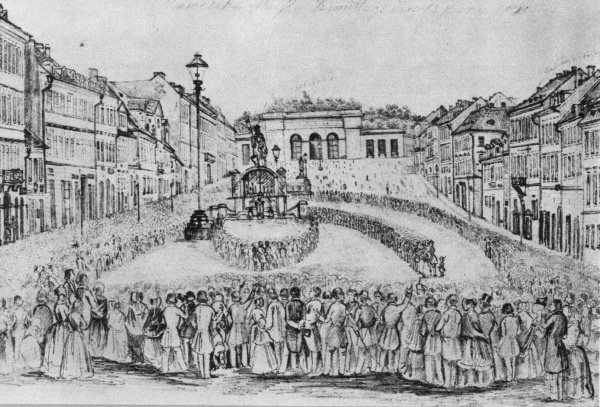
The start of the congress in Prague

The Prague Slavic Congress of 1848 (Czech: Slovanský sjezd, Slovak: Slovanský zjazd/kongres) took place in Prague, Austrian Empire (now Czech Republic) between 2 June and 12 June 1848. It was the first occasion on which representatives from nearly all Slav populations of Europe met in one place to discuss the emerging idea of Pan-Slavism. The delegates at the Congress were not only anti-Austrian, but also anti-Russian, despite the latter being the only fully independent Slavic nation at the time.

Several other Slavic Congresses were held in different central and eastern European cities over the next century.

== Background ==
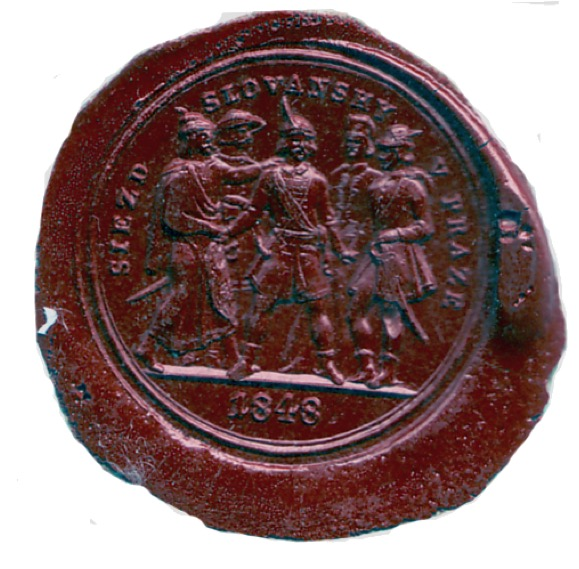
The seal of the Congress

The initiative came from Pavel Jozef Šafárik and Josip Jelačić, but was organized by Czech activists František Palacký, Karl Zapp, Karel Havlíček Borovský, and František Ladislav Rieger.

The exact goal of the Congress was unclear even as it was beginning. In addition to lacking a goal, the conference planners also quarreled over the format and the agenda of the gathering.

Once underway, the conference met in three sections: Poles and Ukrainians (at that time Ruthenians); South Slavs; and Czecho-Slovaks. The Pole-Ukrainian section contained a combination of Ruthenes, Mazurians, Greater Poles, and Lithuanians.

During the Congress, there was debate about the role of Austria in the lives of the Slavs. Josef Frič argued that the "primary goal is the preservation of Austria", adding that the Congress "only differs on the means." This point was disputed by Ľudovít Štúr who told the Congress, “our goal is self-preservation”.

Around 10 June the Manifesto to the Nations of Europe was pronounced. The statement was a strongly worded proclamation that demanded an end to the oppression of the Slav people. The Slavs did not look for any type of revenge, but they wanted to “extend a brotherly hand to all neighbouring nations who are prepared to recognize and effectively champion with us the full equality of all nations, irrespective of their political power or size”. This was an important development because it indicated some sort of unity among all of the Slav people of Europe.

The Congress was cut short on 12 June because of the Prague Uprising of 1848 that erupted when the Austrian garrison in Prague opened fire on a peaceful demonstration. This later became known as the Whitsuntide events because of the timing during the Christian holiday of Pentecost. The delegates left in disgust and some were arrested because of the revolutionary nature of the Congress.

== Congress Commissions ==
=== Czech-Slovak Commission ===
- František Palacký, Czech historian, oversaw the entire conference as president.
- Pavel Jozef Šafárik, Slovak philologist, poet, literary historian and ethnographer, president of the Czecho-Slovak section.
- Ľudovít Štúr, Slovak poet, journalist, publisher, teacher, philosopher, linguist and member of the Hungarian Parliament.
- František Zach, Czech-born soldier and military theorist.

=== Polish-Ruthenian Commission ===
The commission was created on the initiative of František Palacký and Mikhail Bakunin. It was headed by Leon Sapieha and discussed issues of the Polish-Ruthenian relations. Galician Ruthenians (native pronunciation Rusyns, modern Ukrainians) were represented by the political organizations Supreme Ruthenian Council and Ruthenian sobor.

- Karol Libelt, Polish philosopher, writer, political and social activist, social worker, chairman of the Poles and Ukrainians.
- Supreme Ruthenian Council (Iwan Borysykewycz, Hryhorij Hynyłewycz, Ołeksa Zakłynśkyj)
- Ruthenian sobor (Leon Sapieha, Jan Tadeusz Lubomirski, Kasper Cięglewicz, Ludwik Stecki)

=== South Slavic Commission ===
- Stanko Vraz, Slovene poet, vice-president of congress.
- Pavle Stamatović, Serbian writer, historian, and archpriest, chairman of the South Slavs.
- Jovan Subotić, Serbian lawyer, writer, politician and academic, secretary of the South Slavic section.

== Bibliography ==
- Orton, Lawrence D. (1978). The Prague Slav Congress of 1848. East European Quarterly. ISBN 978-0-914710-39-4.
- Tobolka, Zdeněk Václav [in Czech] (1901) [dedicated 1900-12-16]. Slovanský sjezd v Praze roku 1848 [The Slavic Congress in Prague in the Year 1848]. Slovanská knihovna (in Czech). Prague: František Šimáček.
