= Adam Sapieha =

Adam Sapieha may refer to:

- Adam Stefan Sapieha (1867–1951), Polish cardinal of the Roman Catholic Church
- Adam Stanisław Sapieha (1828–1903), Polish nobleman, landlord, politician
