= Andrzej Artur Zamoyski =

Polish noble (1800–1874)

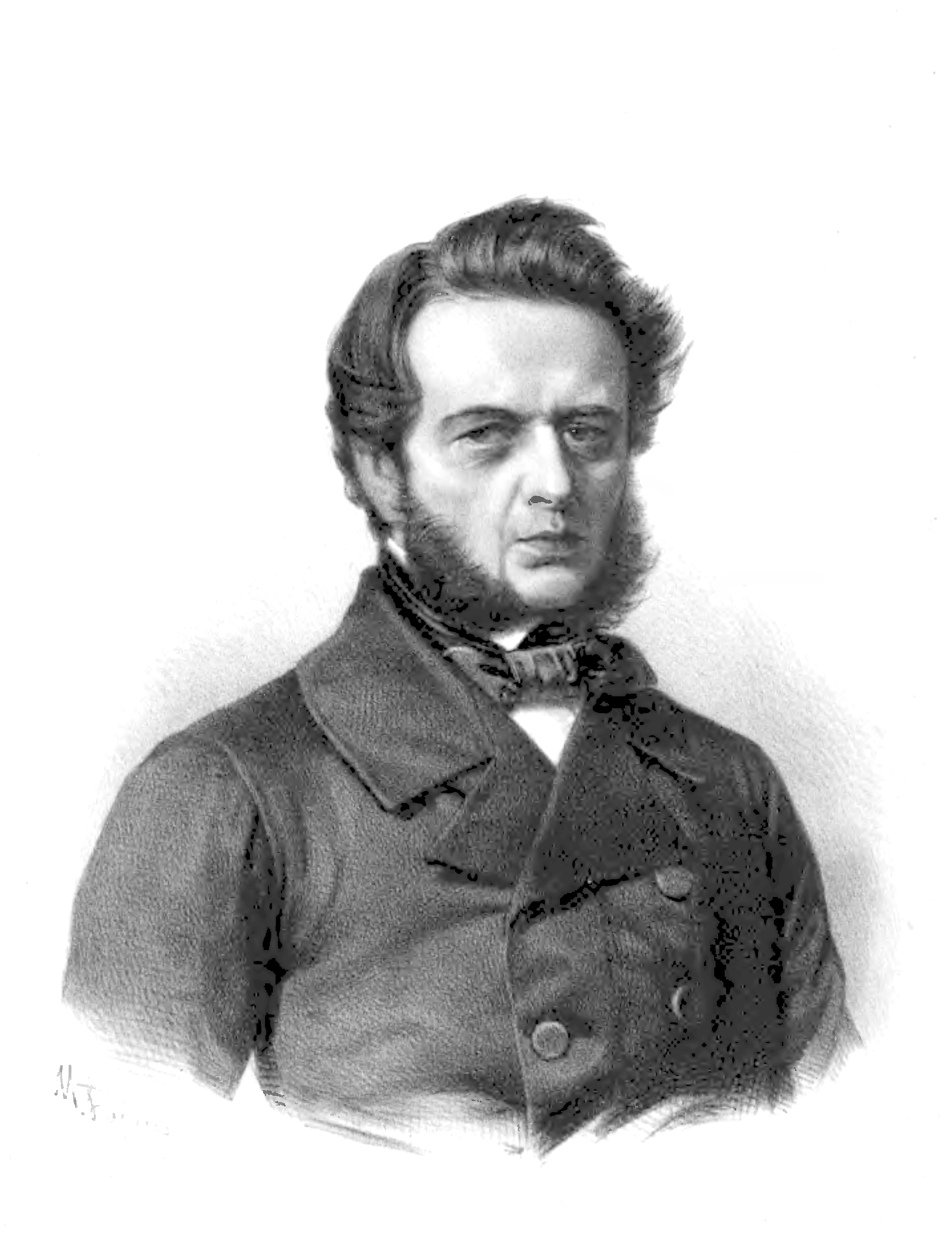
- Coat of arms: Jelita
- Born: 2 April 1800; Vienna
- Died: 29 October 1874 (aged 74); Kraków
- Family: Zamoyski
- Wife: Róża Potocka
- Issue: Zofia Zamoyska,Władysław Zamoyski (1827–1873), Jerzy Zamoyski, Cecylia Zamoyska, Jan Michał Zamoyski, Stanisław Antoni Zamoyski, Róza Zamoyska, Andrzej Antoni Zamoyski, Zdzisław Zamoyski (1842–1925)
- Father: Stanisław Kostka Zamoyski
- Mother: Zofia Czartoryska

Count Andrzej Artur Zamoyski (2 April 1800 – 29 October 1874) was a Polish nobleman, landowner and political and economic activist.

Zamoyski organized meetings of landowners (Klemensowczycy) at his Klemensów estate in the Polish Congress Poland. In 1842 he became co-publisher of the Rocznik Gospodarstwa Krajowego (Polish Farming Annual). He was the founder and chairman of an Agricultural Society.

In 1848 he founded the Steam Navigation Company and thereafter monopolized transport on the Vistula River. He also initiated the building of steamships and barges. The company was directed from 1866 by Maurycy Fajans and was formally liquidated in 1871, when Fajans bought its shipyard at Solec in Warsaw together with the steamers remaining on the river.

Zamoyski was an opponent of Aleksander Wielopolski and a principal figure in the Biali (Whites) political faction. Exiled in September 1863, he settled in France, becoming part of the Polish Great Emigration. In 1872 he was inducted into the Polish Academy of Learning.

== See also ==
- List of Poles
