= Organic work =

Organic work (Polish: praca organiczna) was a phrase adopted from Herbert Spencer by 19th-century Polish Positivists to denote the concept that the nation's vital powers should be devoted to labour ("work from the foundations"), rather than to fruitless national uprisings against the overwhelming militaries of the partitioning empires.

The basic goals of organic work included educating the Polish masses and increasing their economic potential, which was intended to turn the Polish lower classes into a modern nation and to end the population's Germanisation and Russification, pursued by the partitioning occupiers.

== History ==
Increasing oppression by Russia after failed national uprisings (the November Uprising of 1830–1831 and the January Uprising of 1863–1864) finally convinced Polish leaders that the insurrections had been premature at best and perhaps fundamentally misguided and counterproductive. During the decades that followed, Poles largely forsook the goal of immediate independence and turned instead to fortifying the nation through the subtler means of education, economic development and modernization. That approach took the name "organic work" because of its philosophy of strengthening Polish society at the grassroots level and was influenced by positivism. For some, the adoption of organic work meant permanent resignation to foreign rule, but many advocates recommended it as a strategy to combat repression and to await an eventual opportunity for the achievement of self-government.

== Methods ==
Neither as colourful as the Polish rebellions nor as loftily enshrined in national memory, the quotidian methods of organic work proved well suited to the political conditions of the late 19th century. The international balance of forces then did not favour the recovery of Polish statehood, and both Russia and Germany appeared bent on the eventual eradication of Polish national identity. The German Empire, established in 1871 as an expanded version of Prussia, aimed at the assimilation of the eastern provinces inhabited by Poles. At the same time, the Russian Empire attempted to russify the former Congress Kingdom and joined the Germans in levying restrictions against use of the Polish language and culture. Poles under Russian and German rule also endured official campaigns against the Roman Catholic Church: the cultural struggle (Kulturkampf) of German Chancellor Otto von Bismarck to bring the Roman Catholic Church under state control and the Russian campaign to replace Catholicism by extending Orthodoxy throughout the empire.

== Toleration ==
The Polish subjects under Austrian jurisdiction (after 1867, the Habsburg monarchy was commonly known as Austria-Hungary) confronted a generally more lenient regime. Poles suffered no religious persecution in predominantly Catholic Austria, which counted on the Szlachta as allies in the complex political calculus of its multinational realm. In return for loyalty, the Kingdom of Galicia and Lodomeria received considerable administrative and cultural autonomy, gaining a reputation as an oasis of toleration in contrast to the oppression of German and Russian Poland. The Galician Sejm of the Estates acted as a semiautonomous parliamentary body in the province, and Poles represented the region in the empire government in Vienna. In the late 1800s, the universities of Kraków and Lwów became the centers of Polish intellectual activity, and Kraków became the centre of Polish art and thought. Even after the restoration of independence, many residents of southern Poland retained a touch of nostalgia for the days of the Habsburg monarchy.

== See also ==
- Polish Positivism
