= Zofia Czartoryska =

Polish noblewoman (1778–1837)

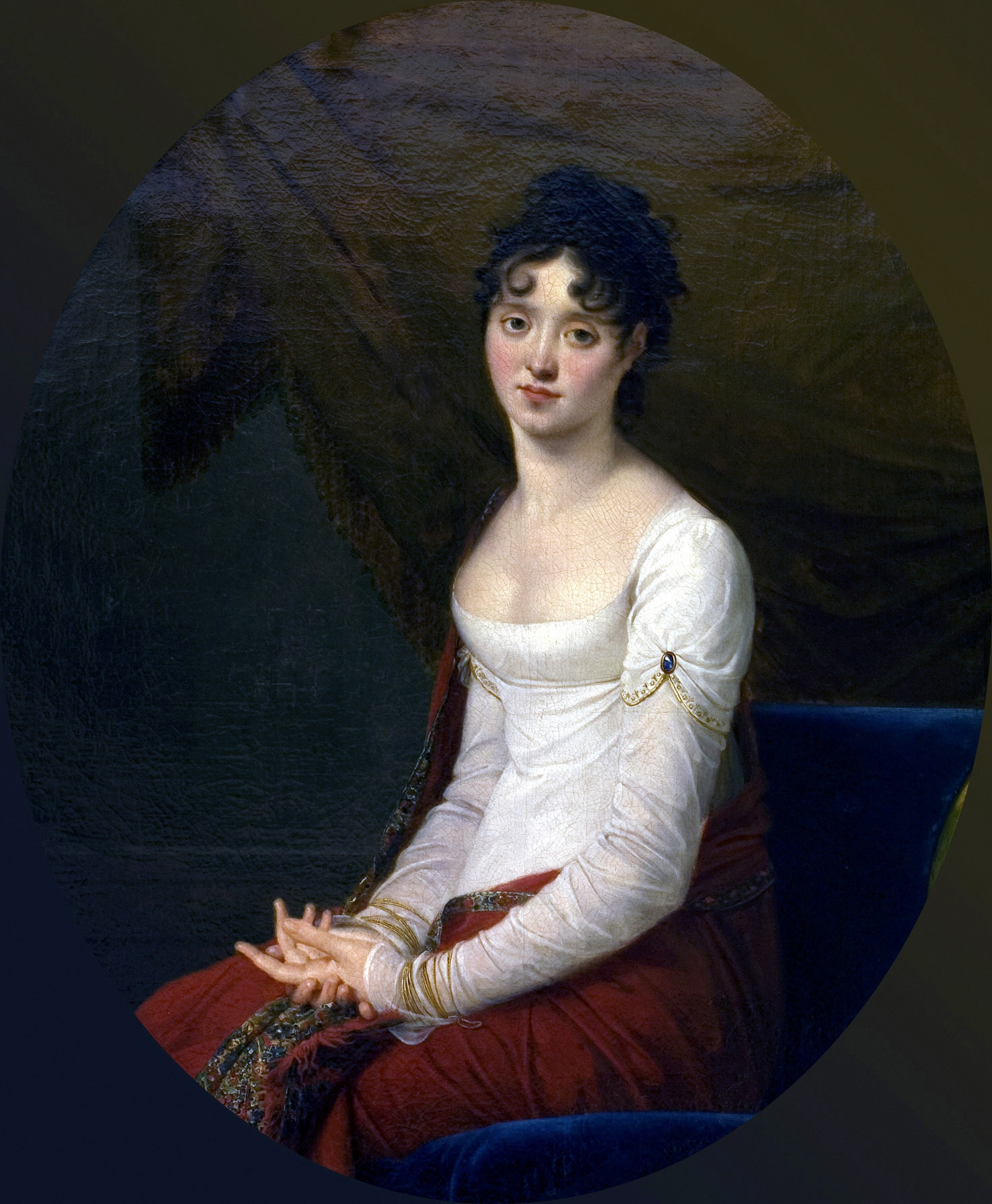
- Portrait by Robert Lefèvre, 1802–1803
- Born: 15 September 1778; Warsaw, Polish-Lithuanian Commonwealth
- Died: 27 February 1837 (aged 58); Florence, Grand Duchy of Tuscany
- Noble family: Czartoryski
- Spouse: Count Stanisław Kostka Zamoyski
- Issue: Konstanty Zamoyski; Andrzej Artur Zamoyski; Jan Zamoyski; Władysław Stanisław Zamoyski; Celina Gryzelda Zamoyska; Jadwiga Klementyna Zamoyska; Zdzisław Zamoyski; Eliza Elżbieta Zamoyska
- Father: Prince Adam Kazimierz Czartoryski
- Mother: Countess Izabela Czartoryska nee Fleming

Princess Zofia Czartoryska (15 September 1778 – 27 February 1837) was a Polish noblewoman.

== Life ==
Zofia Czartoryska was born on 15 September 1778, in Warsaw. She was the fifth child of Princess Izabela Czartoryska née Fleming and her husband Prince Adam Kazimierz Czartoryski, though her father may actually have been Count Franciszek Ksawery Branicki. She ran a salon in Warsaw for Enlightenment era reform leaders of Poland-Lithuania.

Czartoryska was regarded by her contemporaries as a great beauty and sat for numerous portraits. She married Count Stanisław Kostka Zamoyski on 20 May 1798, in Puławy.

She is nicknamed "the Mother of the Zamoyski house", as she gave birth to ten children: Konstanty (born 1799), Andrzej Artur (born 1800), Jan (born 1802), Władysław Stanisław (born 1803), Celina Gryzelda (born 1804), Jadwiga Klementyna (born 1806), Zdzisław (born 1810), August (born 1811), Eliza Elžbieta (born 1818) and Stanisław (born 1820).

Czartoryska engaged in charity work and founded a charity organisation in Warsaw called Warszawskie Towarzystwo Dobroczynności. Eight-years-old Frédéric Chopin gave concerts to support the association. She was a recipient of the Order of the Starry Cross.

Czartoryska wrote and published a handbook Rady dla córki ("advice for a daughter") for her daughter Jadwiga, who then went on to marry Leon Sapieha. The book covered such topics as what it means to be a pious woman and a good wife. The latest edition of the book was published in 2002.

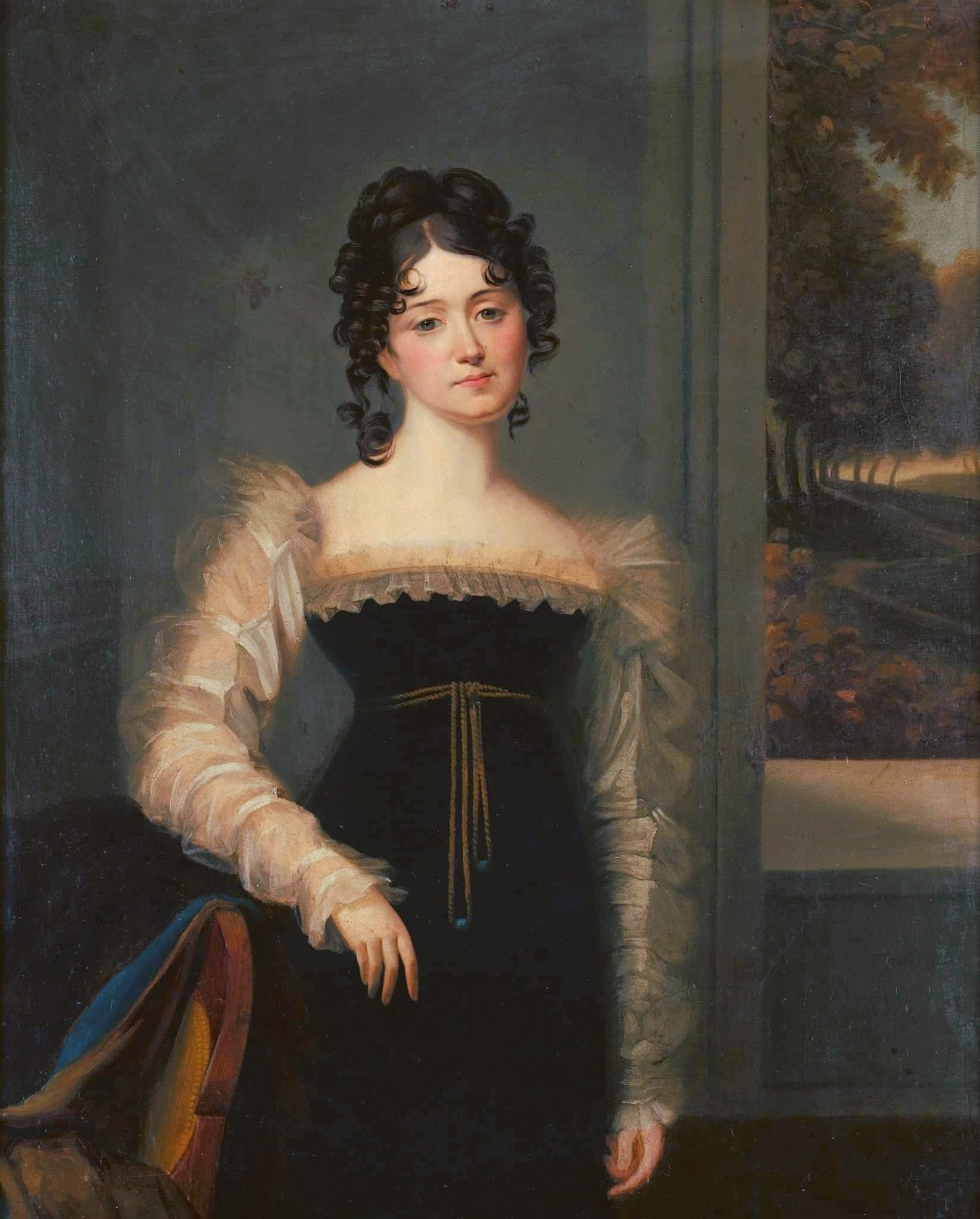
Countess Zofia Zamoyska née Czartoryska, early 19th century.

To alleviate her ill health, Czartoryska travelled abroad. She died on 27 February 1837, in Florence, of tuberculosis. She was buried at Santa Croce, her funerary monument was created by sculptor Lorenzo Bartolini.

== Gallery ==
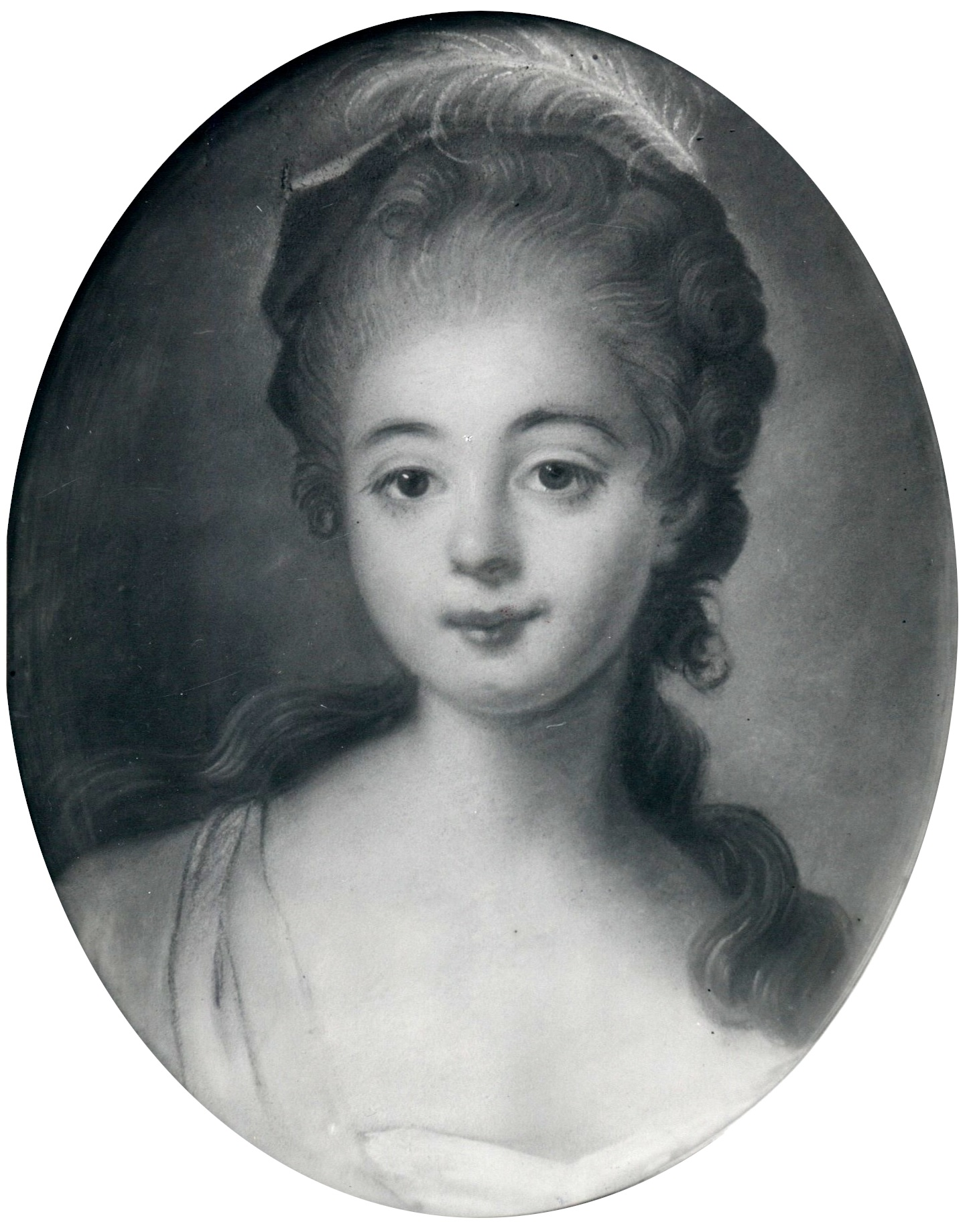
Portrait, author and date unknown

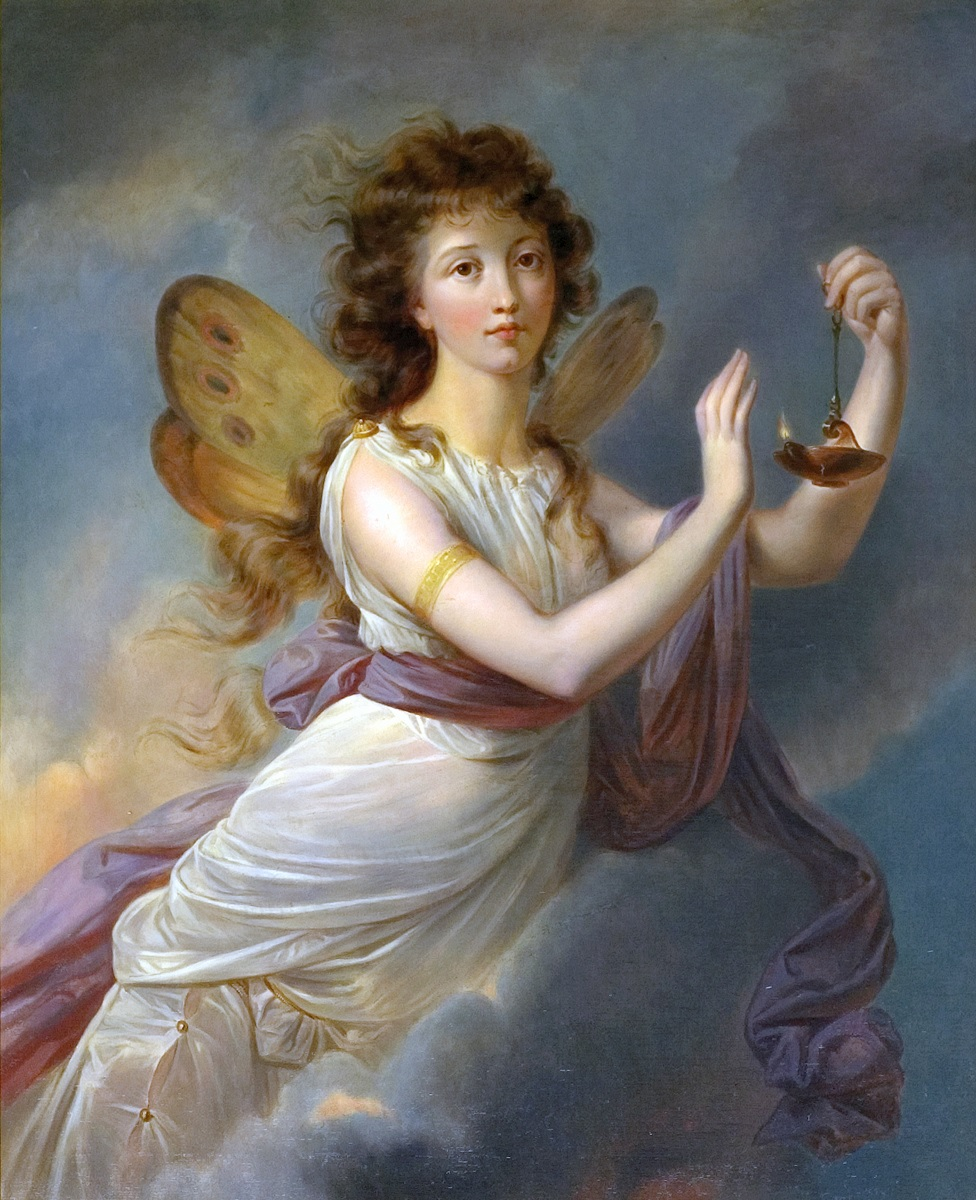
Zofia Czartoryska as Psyche, Wincenty de Lesseur, 1797

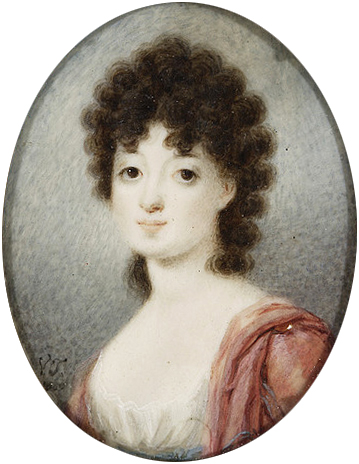
Miniature portrait by Waleria Tarnowska, 1803, National Museum, Warsaw

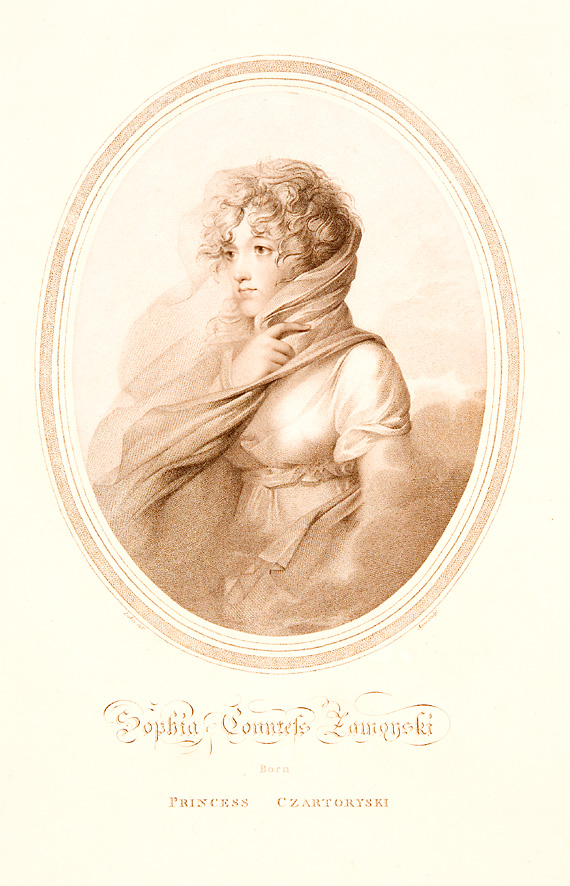
Portrait by John Samuel Agar, 1804

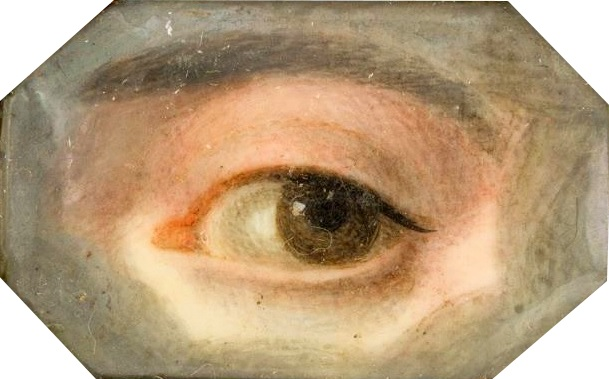
Eye of Zofia Czartoryska, author and date unknown
