= Jadwiga Sapieżyna =

Polish noble (1806–1890)

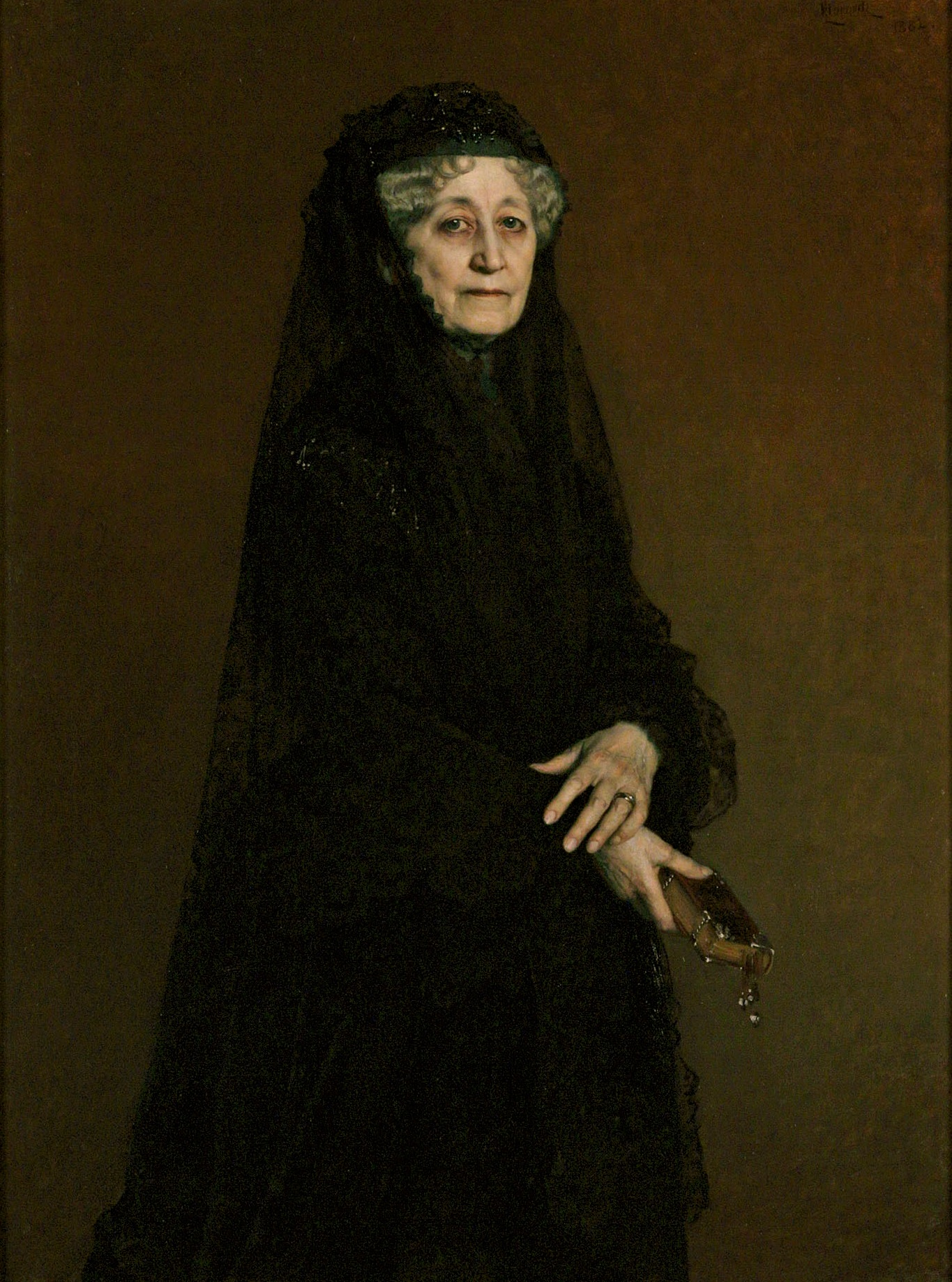
- Portrait of Jadwiga Sapieżyna by Leopold Horowitz, 1882
- Full name: Jadwiga z Zamoyskich Sapieżyna
- Born: 9 July 1806; Podzamcze, Masovian Voivodeship
- Died: 29 March 1890 (aged 83); Krasiczyn
- Spouse: Leon Sapieha
- Issue: Adam Stanisław Sapieha
- Father: Stanisław Kostka Zamoyski
- Mother: Zofia Czartoryska

Jadwiga Sapieżyna, née Zamoyska (9 July 1806 – 29 March 1890) was a Polish noblewoman and philanthropist.

== Life ==
Jadwiga was born on 9 July, 1806, as the sixth child of Zofia Czartoryska née Fleming and her husband Stanisław Kostka Zamoyski. She received a thorough education. Her mother wrote and published for her a handbook called Rady dla córki ("advice for a daughter"). The book covered such topics as what it means to be a pious woman and a good wife. The latest edition of the book was published in 2002.

Jadwiga married Leon Sapieha on 19 December 1825. In the spring of 1830, she travelled with her husband to Paris, where she made a good impression at the royal court of Charles X. After the fall of the November Uprising, in which her husband took part, she lived frugally with him in Kraków and Piskorowice. She became an advocate of hydrotherapy of Vincenz Priessnitz in hope of curing her ailing children, five of which died in infancy and another two when they were sixteen and twenty.

Jadwiga devoted her life to philanthropy. In Lviv, she led the Towarzystwo Dobroczynności św. Wincentego a Paulo charity association. She also founded orphanages for children whose parents had been killed in the Galician slaughter, which later were transformed into an institution led by nuns and a children's hospital with a capacity of 120 beds. Additionally, Sapieżyna founded a workhouse for beggars with a ward for "fallen girls". She also created a charity association in Przemyśl. To support her institutions, she constantly ran fund-raising events in Lviv. Those who were ill-disposed towards her claimed she conducted all the charity work with the money from fund-raising, and none from her own.

During the January Uprising, Sapieżyna founded a hospital for the wounded insurgents in Krasiczyn and supported hospitals in Lviv and Cieszanów. In February 1864, she helped her son Adam Stanisław Sapieha break out of prison. After the death of her husband, she gradually ceded the leading role in her charity organisations to her daughter-in-law, Jadwiga.

She died on 29 March, 1890, in Krasiczyn.
