= Council of Four Lands =

Central body of Jewish authority in Poland from late 16th century to 1764

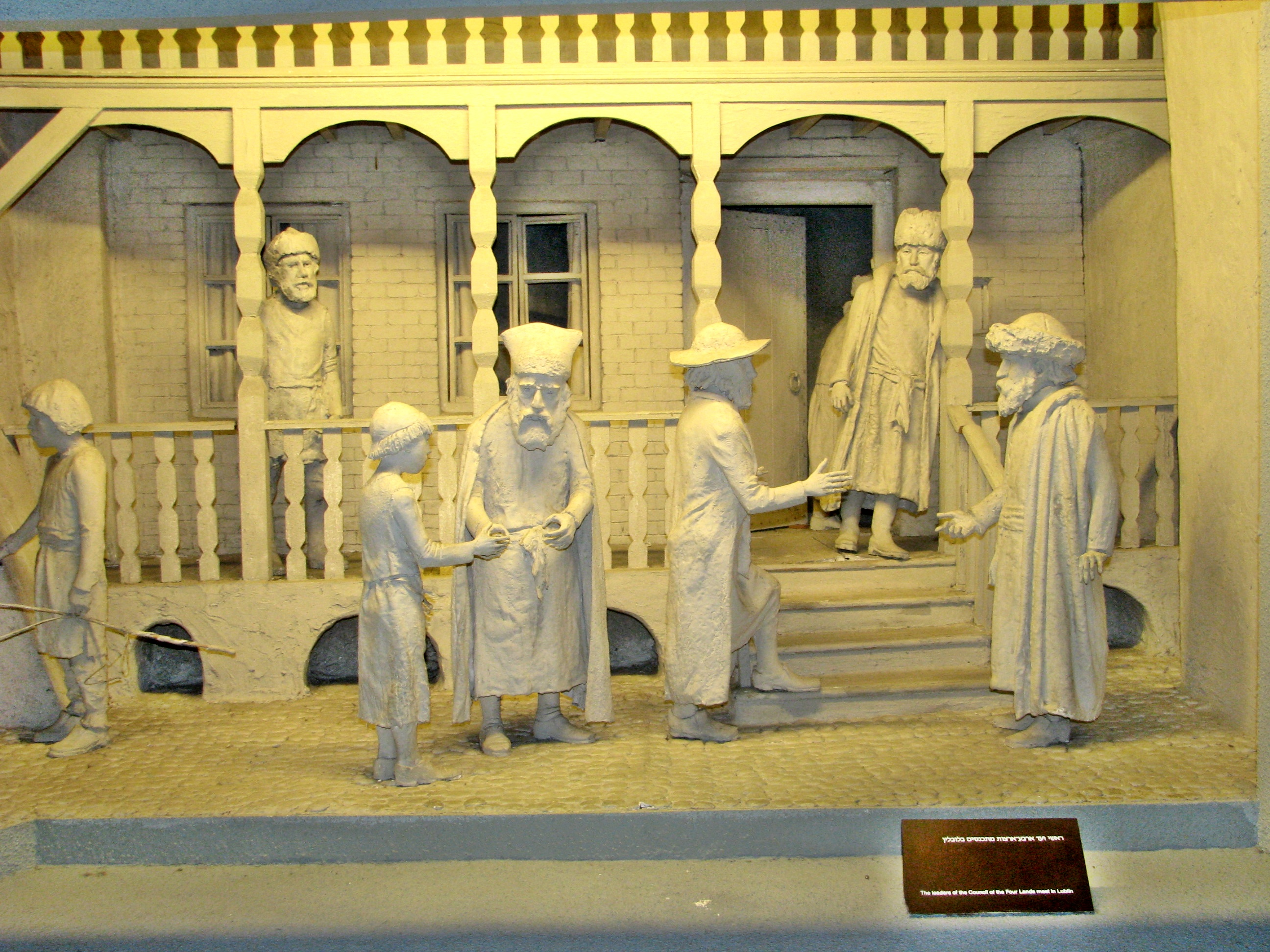
An exhibit at the Diaspora Museum, Tel Aviv, depicting the meeting of the leaders of the Council of Four Lands

The Council of Four Lands (Hebrew: ועד ארבע ארצות, romanized: Vaʿad Arbaʿ Araṣot, Polish: Sejm Czterech Ziem) was an autonomous representative body of Jewry in the Polish–Lithuanian Commonwealth from the second half of the 16th century to 1764, located in Lublin. The Council's principal function was to administer the collective self-taxation of Jewish communities. Its first law is recorded as having been passed in 1580. Seventy delegates from local qehillot met to discuss taxation and other issues important to the Jewish community. The "four lands" were Greater Poland, Lesser Poland, Galicia (with Podolia) and Volhynia. The earliest form of the Council was organized in 1514 by Sigismund I the Old and Abraham of Bohemia was put in charge of it.

In Polish it was referred to as the Jewish Sejm (Polish: Sejm Żydowski). In Latin it was referred to as the Jewish General Congress (Latin: Congressus Generalis Iudaicus, or Congressus Generalis Iudaeorum).

The terms "Council of Three Lands" and "Council of Five Lands" and more have also been used for the same body. In 1623, the Jewish communities from the Grand Duchy of Lithuania withdrew from the "Council of Four Lands" and established "the Council of the Land of Lithuania" (Hebrew: ועד קהילות ליטא, romanized: Va'ad Kahilot Lita, sometimes translated as simply "the Council of Lithuania").

Council of Four Lands (Poland and Ukraine)

1. Lviv, Galicia (also called "Ruthenia"; included Podolia, and originally also Volhynia)
2. Kraków, Lesser Poland (originally counted as one together with Greater Poland)
3. Ostroh, Volhynia (originally part of Lviv, Ruthenia)
4. Poznań, Greater Poland (originally counted as one together with Lesser Poland)
- (Lithuania was one of the Lands until it seceded in 1623)

Council of Lithuania (including Belarus; seceded from the Council of Four Lands in 1623)

1. Brest (Brisk, Brzesc)
2. Grodno (Hrodna)
3. Pinsk
4. Slutsk (Słuck, separated from Brest in 1691)
5. Vilnius (Wilno, joined in 1652)

== Place in Jewish European life ==
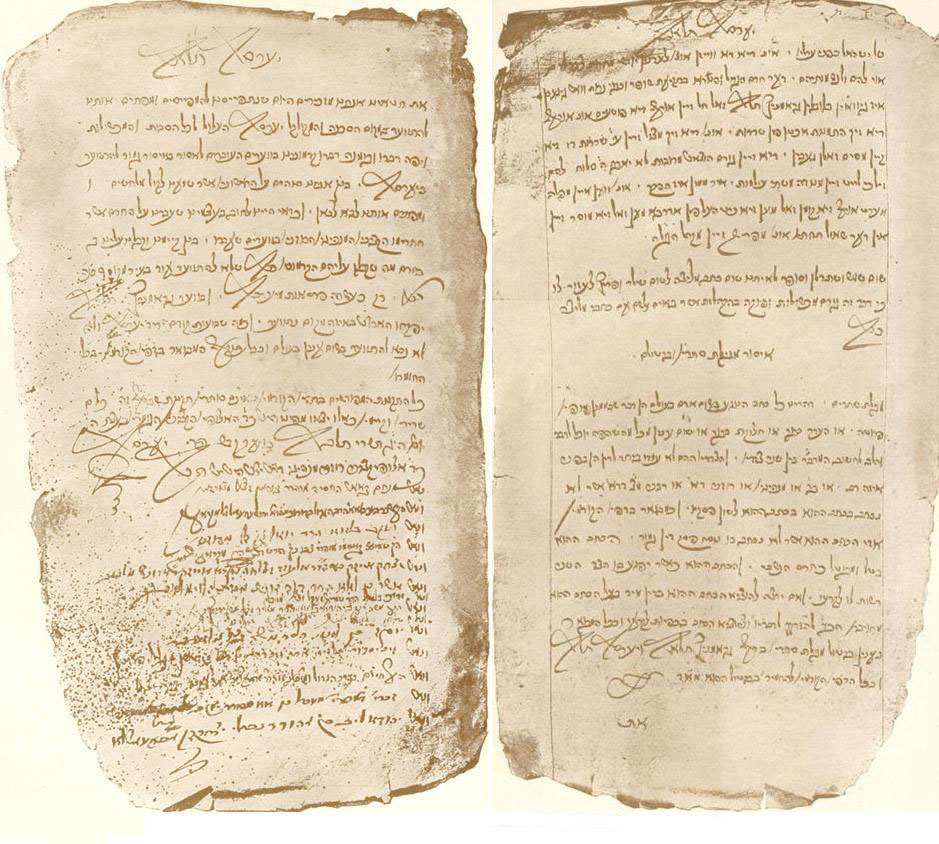
Page from the minute-book of the Council (obverse and reverse), once in the possession of Simon Dubnow.

The great number of the Jewish population of Poland, its importance in the industrial life of the country, and the peculiarities of the political and class organization of the Polish–Lithuanian Commonwealth were the reasons why the Jews of Poland formed a separate class enjoying liberal autonomy within the sphere of their communal and spiritual interests, the outcome of which was their exemplary communal organization. A Jewish community, with its administrative, judicial, religious, and charitable institutions, constituted a unit of self-government. The term "Kahal" denoted both the community (a community was also known as a Kahilah Kadisha or Holy Community) and the autonomous communal administration, the two concepts being identical. The administrative functions: the assessment of state and communal taxes, the supervision of charitable institutions, etc. of the Kahal were performed by elective Kahal elders, while its rabbis ("doctores Judæorum") had charge of religious and judicial affairs.

== Number of delegates and frequency of meetings ==
During the second half of the seventeenth century, the sessions of the Council occurred once or twice a year, more frequently at Jarosław than at Lublin. The number of delegates cannot be exactly ascertained. One source notes that one representative to the Council was elected from each qahal and that, in addition, the six leading rabbis of Poland were appointed as delegates to the Council. It appears from the qahal pinḥases that only the most important qehillot of each region sent delegates to the Council.

The capitals (Poznań, Kraków, Lviv, and Ostroh) of the "four lands" each sent two or even more delegates. The signatures of fifteen to twenty-five delegates (though often the signatures of the six rabbis only) are usually found attached to the extant decisions of the wa'ads. The total number of delegates, together with the rabbis, evidently reached thirty.

In the eighteenth century, the Council's operations became increasingly limited; its sessions were held less regularly, mainly in Jaroslaw. One of the last important congresses was that held at Jaroslaw in the fall of 1753. Among other matters considered was the famous dispute between the rabbis Jacob Emden and Jonathan Eybeschutz over the Sabbataean movement, resulting in the latter's acquittal on the charge of heresy in 1753. However, the Council overturned this ruling in 1756, when Eybeschutz was placed under a ban.

Eliyahu ben Shmuel of Lublin states in the introduction to his book Yad Eliyahu that he remembers attending meetings of the Council of Four Lands as a child. He writes, "During my youth, I was raised among many people of our nation, within the holy community of Lublin. In my days, there was a meeting of scholars, the wise men of Yisrael, during the Gramitz Fairs every year... I imbibed their words thirstily..."

In 1764, the Sejm of the Polish–Lithuanian Commonwealth ordered the discontinuation of Jewish general congresses (Vol. Legum, vii. 50) and the activity of the Council of Four Lands came to an end. The decision was based on the Council's failure to remit the taxes it had collected. The subsequent partition of Poland among the Russian Empire, Habsburg Austria, and the Kingdom of Prussia, changing, as it did, the whole kahal system, was unfavorable to the existence of such central autonomous bodies as the Council.

== Activity ==
Its activity may be divided into four branches:

1. Legislative
2. Administrative
3. Judicial
4. Spiritual and cultural.

== See also ==
- Vaad

== Bibliography ==
- Pendzich, Barbara M. (1993). "The Jewish community of Sluck after the Polish-Muscovite War of 1654-1667". Proceedings of the World Congress of Jewish Studies. 11. World Union of Jewish Studies: 173–180. ISSN 0333-9068. JSTOR 23536313.
