= Supreme Ruthenian Council =

Ukrainian political organization (1848–1851)

Supreme Ruthenian Council Головна Руська Рада
- Austrian Empire

Type
- Type: political organization

History
- Established: 2 May 1848
- Disbanded: 30 June 1851

Leadership
- Chair: Hryhoriy Yakhymovych

Meeting place
- Metropolitan Palace, Lviv

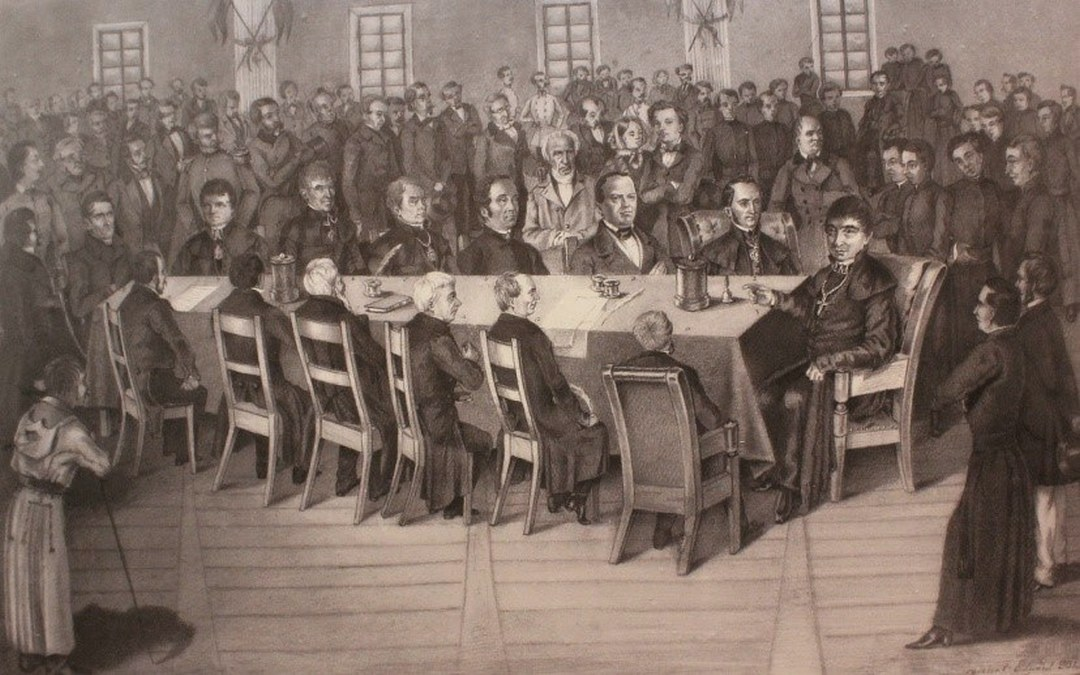
First congress of the Supreme Ruthenian Council

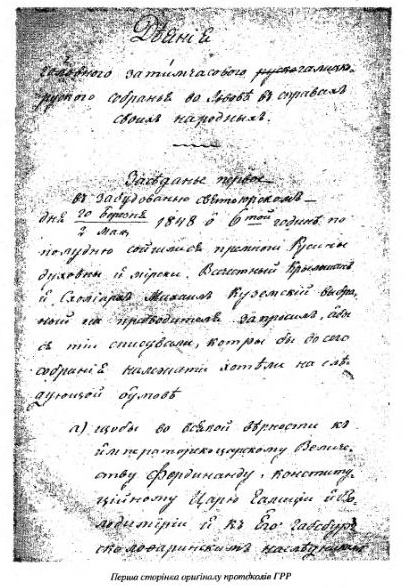
Protocols of the Supreme Ruthenian Council's inaugural session

Supreme Ruthenian Council (Ukrainian: Головна Руська Рада, romanized: Hołovna Ruśka Rada) was the first legal Ruthenian (Note: "Ruthenians" (German: Ruthenen) was the only official designation given to ethnic Ukrainians living in the Habsburg Monarchy until its dissolution in 1918.) political organization that existed from May 1848 to June 1851.

== Proclamation ==
It was founded on 2 May 1848 in Lemberg (today Lviv), Austrian Empire, as the result of the 1848 Spring of Nations and in response to the establishment of the Polish Central National Council, which claimed itself to be the representative body of the whole Kingdom of Galicia and Lodomeria. Established on the premises of Saint George's Cathedral, the metropolitan cathedral of the Ukrainian Greek Catholic Church, in its manifesto of 10 May 1848 the council declared the unity of all 15 million Ruthenians (Ukrainians) and declared them to be a distinct people from both Poles and Russians.

== Political demands ==
The organization's political program consisted of three main demands:

- Division of Galicia into two separate administrative units: western for Poles and eastern for Ukrainians (originally proposed by governor Stadion in 1847);
- Unification of all Ukrainian lands of Galicia, Subcarpathia, and Bucovina into one province;
- Introduction of school lectures and publication of government statements in Ukrainian language.

== Composition ==
Supreme Ruthenian Council consisted of 30 members who were representatives of the Ukrainian Greek Catholic Church and intelligentsia. Head of the council was bishop of Premissel Hryhoriy Yakhymovych, followed by canon Mykhailo Kuzemsky. Yakhymovych's assistants were Mykhailo Kuzemsky and Ivan Borysykevych. The council consisted of several departments and developed 34 branches around Galicia.

== Political activities ==
On 15 May 1848, with financial support of Austrian authorities, the Supreme Council started publishing Zoria Halytska, the first Ukrainian newspaper, which would be issued until 1857.

Three members of the organization attended the Prague Slavic Congress in June 1848. At the congress Ukrainian representatives recognized the status of Galicia as part of Austria and opposed its inclusion into a restored Poland, and supported the use of Ukrainian language in schools.

On 18 May 1848 the Council declared that "the flag of local Ruthenian land consists of the lion, and the colors of Ruthenia are yellow and blue" (знамя земли рускои тутейшои єсть левъ, а цвѣты руски жовтый и синый). On 25 May 1848 "a banner of Ruthenian colors, and next to it, on the left side, a Polish banner" (хоруговъ рускои барвы, а при ней зъ лѣвои стороны хоруговъ польску) was hoisted on the tower of the Lviv Town Hall. The Supreme Ruthenian Council disassociated itself from the event and in its newspaper Zoria Halytska claimed: "it was not Ruthenians who have done it, and we even do not know who did" (то не Русини оучинили, и наветъ не знаютъ, кто тоє оучинивъ).

During the July 1848 election 10 members of the Council were elected to the Reichsrat, most of them clergymen. In its social policies the Council attempted to balance the interests of the predominantly conservative church leadership with the ones of liberal intelligentsia and local clergy, as well as peasantry. It adopted a liberal program characteristic of the Spring of Nations, including liquidation of class privileges, guarantee of political and civic freedoms, free trade and industry, protection of private property, but at the same time protected the rights of peasants for free use of landowners' properties.

Next year, the Supreme Ruthenian Council ordered to held festivities in Lviv Town Hall, including hanging of the "Ruthenian blue-yellow and Austrian black-yellow" banners. During the Hungarian Revolution of 1848, the Austrian government approved the creation of a Ruthenian national guard in the form of the Battalion of Ruthenian Mountain sharpshooters, which was tasked with guarding the border with Hungary in the Carpathians. The battalion was dissolved following the suppression of the revolt.

== Cultural activities ==
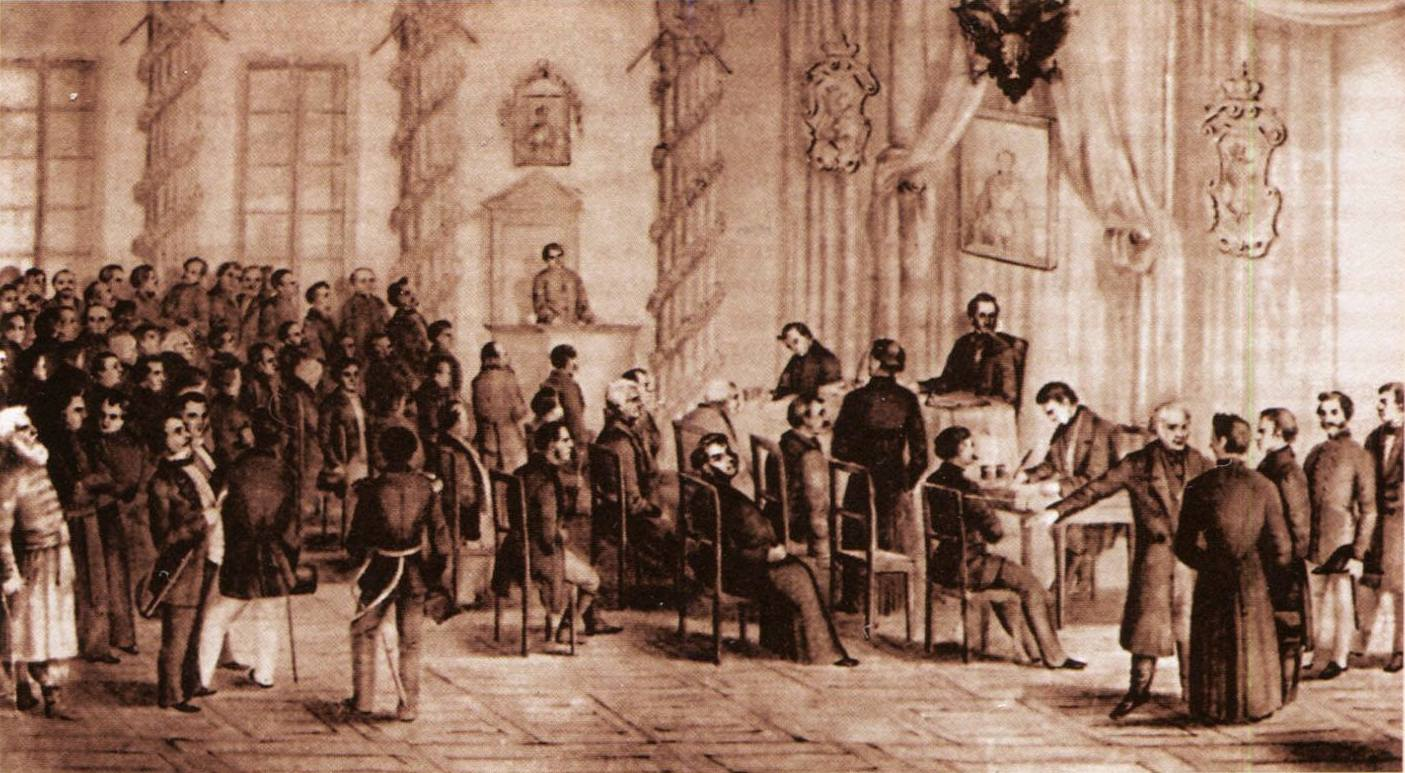
Congress of Ruthenian Scientists

Aside from its political activities, the Supreme Ruthenian Council supported the creation of a cultural association known as Narodnyi dim ("National Home"), which engaged in publishing, provided student scholarships and became a venue for Ukrainian cultural events in Lviv.

The Council lobbied the introduction of Ruthenian (Ukrainian) language in local schools and gymnasiums, and managed the chair of Ruthenian language and literature at the Lviv University, which was created in September 1848. Headed by Yakiv Holovatsky, the chair is considered to be the first Ukrainian-language university department.

In June 1848 members of the Council created the Galician-Ruthenian Matica - an educational organization tasked with the publishing of popular books and promotion of teaching among the common folk. In October the Congress of Ruthenian Scientists convened in Lviv with the participation of over 100 delegates.

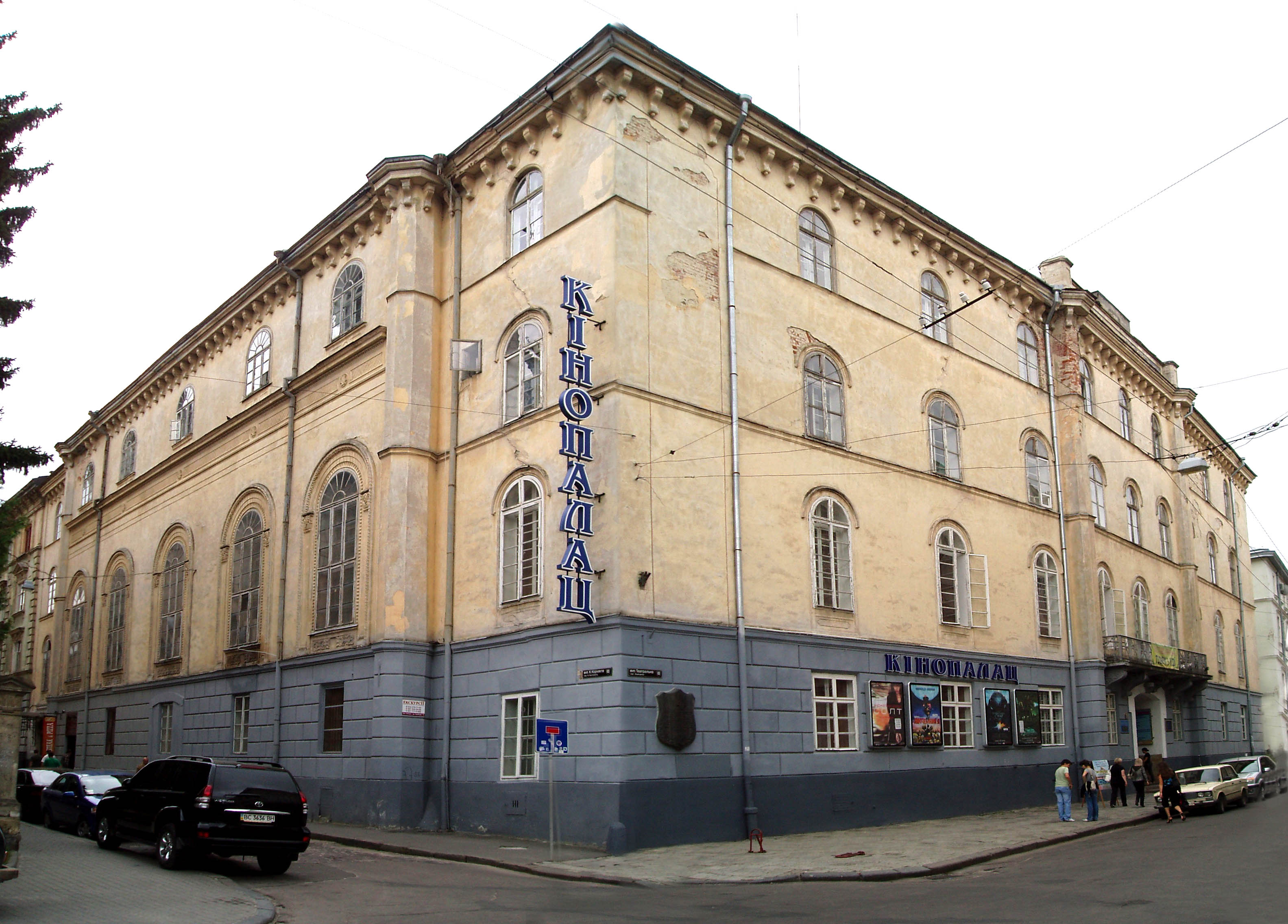
Building of the former Ruthenian People's House (National Home) in Lviv

== Dissolution ==
Following the introduction of state of emergency in Galicia following the failed rebellion of 1 November 1848, the Council continued its activities, although its political role lost its actuality. On 30 June 1851 the organization was transformed into a commission dedicated to the construction of Lviv's National Home, which would serve as the city's main Ruthenian cultural institution in the following decades, and ceased to exist as a political institution.

== Legacy ==
Despite failing to achieve most of its initial goals, most prominently the partition of Galicia, the Supreme Ruthenian Council played an important role in Galician politics, signifying the entry of Ruthenian population onto the political arena. The Council's pro-Austrian orientation had a long-lasting influence for the emerging Ukrainian national movement, and its adoption of blue and yellow as national colours was followed by the wider Ukrainian community. The competition for power in Galicia with the Polish national movement, which was initiated by the Supreme Ruthenian Council in 1848, would eventually lead to full-scale military confrontation during the Polish-Ukrainian War of 1918.

== See also ==
- Prague Slavic Congress, 1848
- Ruthenian sobor
- Ukrainian national revival
