= List of assemblies called Sejm =

The Sejm of the Republic of Poland (Polish pronunciation: [ˈsɛjm]; Polish: Sejm Rzeczypospolitej Polskiej) is the lower house of the Polish parliament. Its name comes from what was once a generic Polish word for a political gathering. It is also used to refer to historical diets or assemblies.

== Pre-partition sejms ==
- Sejm of the Kingdom of Poland, 15th–16th centuries
- Sejm of the Polish–Lithuanian Commonwealth, 1569–1793
- Sejm of Four Lands, or Council of Four Lands (Sejm Czterech Ziem, Va'ad Arba' Aratzot), central Jewish authority in Poland, 1580–1764

=== Types of sessions ===
- Confederated sejm (sejm skonfederowany), a form of sejm where decisions were made by the majority of deputy votes cast
- Convocation sejm (sejm konwokacyjny), part of the process of royal elections in which candidates were put forward and rules of election established
- Coronation sejm (sejm koronacyjny), the first sejm convened by a newly crowned king
- Election sejm (sejm elekcyjny), the election of the king by the nobility
- Pacification sejm (Sejm pacyfikacyjny), held after a period of conflict, usually a disputed royal election, to bring peace and unity to the country

=== Specific sessions ===
In chronological order:

- Convocation Sejm (1764)
- Election Sejm of 1632
- Silent Sejm (Sejm Niemy), 1717
- Repnin Sejm (Sejm Repninowski), 1767–1768
- Partition Sejm (Sejm Rozbiorowy), 1773–1775
- Great Sejm (Sejm Wielki), 1788–1792
- Grodno Sejm (Sejm Grodzieński), 1793

== Post-partition sejms ==
In chronological order:

- Galician Sejm (Sejm Galicyjski, Sejm Krajowy), or Diet of Galicia and Lodomeria, 1861–1918
- Silesian Sejm, or Silesian Parliament (Sejm Śląski), legislature of the Autonomous Silesian Voivodeship, 1920–1939
- Sejm of the Republic of Central Lithuania (Sejm Litwy Środkowej), 1922
- Contract Sejm (sejm kontraktowy), 1989–1991

== See also ==
- Saeima, the parliament of Latvia
- Seimas, the parliament of Lithuania
- Seym River, a river in Russia and Ukraine spelled "Sejm" in Polish
