= Sejm of the Estates =

Parliament in the first half of the 19th century

Sejm of the Estates Postulate Sejm Sejm stanowy Stany galicyjskie Sejm postulatowy

Type
- Type: Unicameral
- Seats: varied between 41 (1834) and 289 (1782)

Elections
- Last election: 1845

Meeting place
- Lemberg (Lviv, Lwów)

The Sejm of the Estates (Polish: Sejm Stanowy) or Estates of Galicia (Polish: Stany Galicyjskie) were the parliament in the first half of the 19th century Galicia region in Austrian Empire. The body existed from 1775 to 1845. In the history of the Polish parliament, it succeeded the general sejm and local sejmiks on the territories of the Austrian partition. The Estates were disbanded following the Kraków Uprising of 1846. In 1861 they were succeeded by the Sejm of the Land (Polish: sejm krajowy).

The estates in question were primarily clergy and szlachta (nobility), with a token townsfolk representation. Peasantry was not represented.

== History ==
=== Postulate Sejm ===
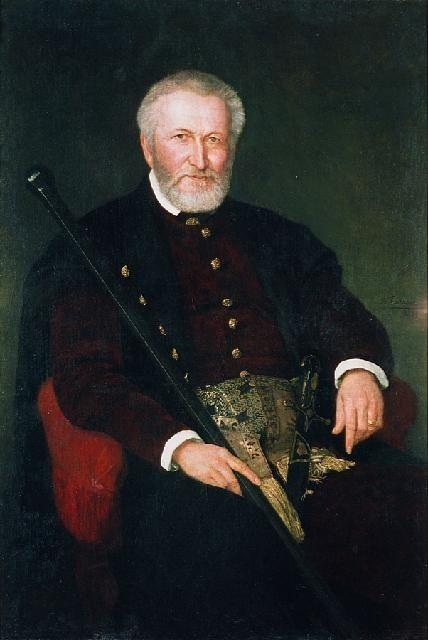
Leon Sapieha, the first speaker of the Sejm of the Estates of Galicia.

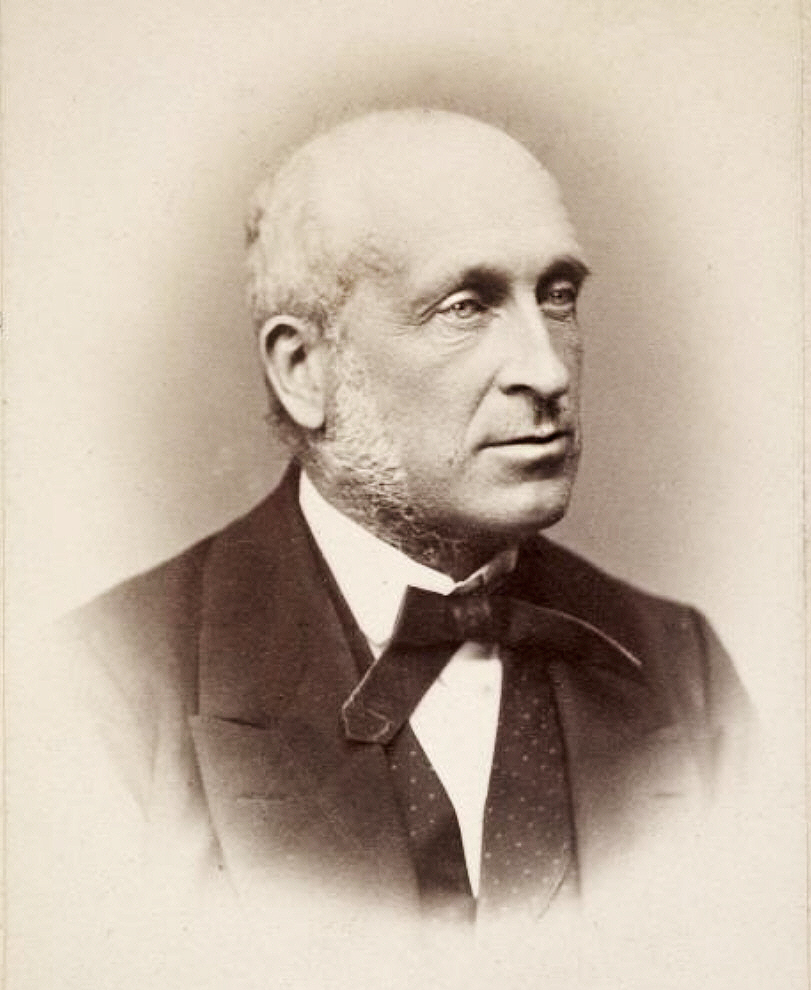
Count Agenor Romuald Gołuchowski.

Parts of the Polish–Lithuanian Commonwealth Lesser Poland territories were included in the Austrian partition as early as the First Partition of Poland in 1772. In order to reduce dissent, the Austrian Empire in 1775 allowed the Polish nobility (szlachta) of the newly acquired territories to continue their tradition of holding local parliament-like meetings, and gave the permission for an advisory body, the Postulate Sejm (Polish: sejm postulatowy), to be held every year. The implementation of the Postulate Sejm was delayed, and eventually it held only four sessions, all in Lviv (Lwów, Lemberg): in 1782, 1784, 1786 and 1788. The body had no real power; it could only write petitions to the monarch, who had no obligation to act on them. Polish legal scholar Stanisław Grodziski noted that while the Sejm, on the surface, continued the Polish parliamentary tradition, the real goal of the powerless body, as intended by the Austrian court, was to drive a wedge between the various groups of Polish nobility, reducing their unity and influence. The Postulate Sejm was composed of wealthy nobility and two deputies from the city of Lviv. The sessions lasted a few days each. The 1788 session was the last one; parts of the Austrian-held Commonwealth territories were briefly included in the Duchy of Warsaw following the Polish–Austrian War in 1806, and the populace represented at the Sejm of the Duchy of Warsaw, but this was short lived, as the territories in question were restored to Austria following the Duchy's occupation and the terms of the Congress of Vienna in 1815.

=== Estates of Galicia ===
Soon afterward, in 1817, Francis I of Austria called for a new sejm, now named the Estates of Galicia (Polish: Stany Galicyjskie), which met again in Lviv. Most scholars, like Jacek Jędruch, see this body as a continuation of the Postulate Sejm, and discuss both of them together. The Austrian Emperor decreed that the members have to wear a special uniform; this made it the only Polish parliament-like body in the history of Polish politics with a dress code requirement.

Excepting the establishment of the Ossolineum as a center for Polish cultural study, the Sejm reflected the conservative attitudes of the body's unelected members from the nobility. From the late 1830s an influx of new members, such as Leon Sapieha, Władysław Badeni, and Governor Wacław Michał Zaleski, Agenor Gołuchowski made the body more progressive and representative. In the 1840s the Sejm saw much debate on the subject of the abolition of serfdom. The Estates last met in 1845, when they voted, 116 to 10, on the proposal to abolish serfdom; however they lacked the power to implement it and had to wait for the Emperor's decision. The Estates were disbanded following the Kraków Uprising of 1846, a mostly peasant rebellion aimed, ironically, at many of the nobles who were supportive of the abolition of serfdom. In 1848, during the Spring of Nations unrest, when the Emperor tried to convene the Estates, the members refused, demanding a more representative composition, and increased powers; the Emperor turned down their demand. In 1861 the Estates were succeeded by the Country Sejm (Polish: sejm krajowy).

== Composition and organization ==
The number of the members was not fixed; it varied from over 200 (with 289 in 1782 and 213 in 1817) to as low as 41 (in 1834); in most years the Sejm had averaged 60 to 80 deputies. They were composed of clergy, nobility (either titled or above a certain, relatively high, income level), two deputies from the city of Lviv representing the burghers and later, Chancellor of the University of Lwów. The members were not elective, holding the mandates due to their offices, titles or wealth. This made the Sejm not representative, and rather conservative.

The Estates met for a few days each year, with some exceptions: they were not convened in the years 1831 and 1832 (time of the November Uprising in the neighboring Polish statelet, the Congress Kingdom).

The Estates had no dedicated location to meet. To evade Emperor's limitation on the proceedings duration and topics to be discussed, the members met before each session at various locations. While in session, they met at the former monastery buildings, owned by the University of Lwów.

== Competences ==
Just like the preceding Postulate Sejm, the Estates had very limited competences: they met to hear the Emperor decrees, distribute tax assessments, grant Galician titles of nobility to individuals who already held similar titles elsewhere in the Austrian Empire, prepare petitions and appeals to be heard by the Emperor. Polish 19th-century historian, Henryk Schmitt, wrote that the role of the Estates was to listen to the government decisions, and file petitions, which often waited for the royal reply for several years; he thus notes that the Estates were powerless, a "comedy", their only purpose being to fulfill the Congress of Vienna requirement of having some form of "national representation" on the lands of the Austrian partition.

== See also ==
- Landtag
