= Adam Stanisław Sapieha =

Polish nobleman and politician (1828–1903)

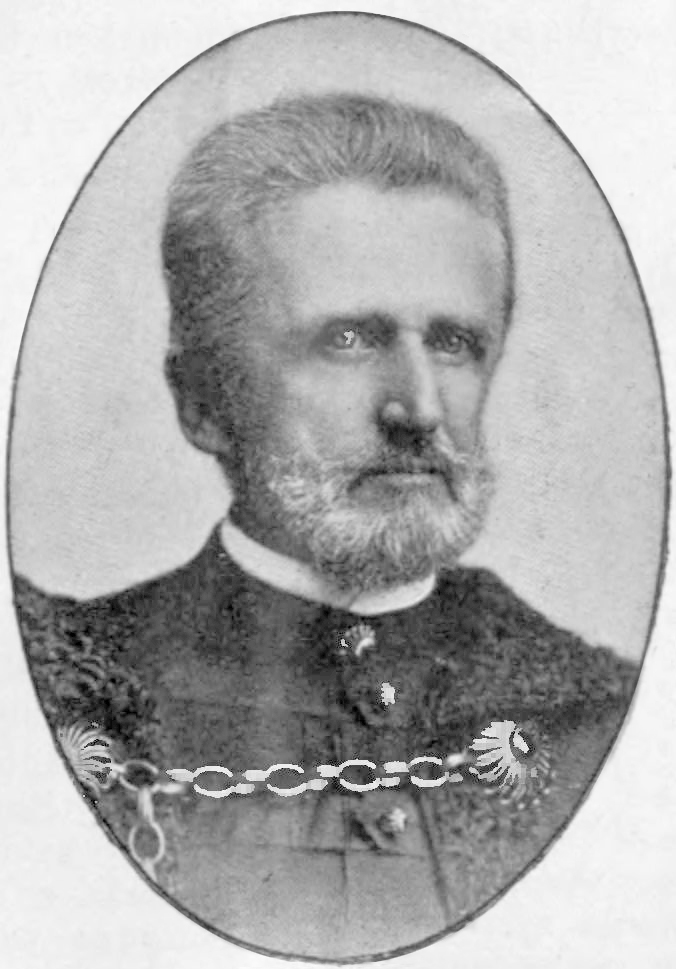
- Coat of arms: Lis
- Born: 4 December 1828; Warsaw, Congress Poland
- Died: 21 July 1903 (aged 74); Bad Reichenhall, Kingdom of Bavaria, German Empire
- Noble family: Sapieha
- Consort: Jadwiga Sanguszko
- Issue: Prince Władysław Sapieha; Countess Maria Jadwiga Żółtowski; Prince Leon Sapieha; Countess Helena Maria Stadnicki; Prince Paweł Sapieha; Prince Jan Sapieha; Prince Adam Sapieha
- Father: Leon Sapieha
- Mother: Jadwiga Klementyna Zamoyska

Prince Adam Stanisław Sapieha (4 December 1828– 21 July 1903) was a Polish nobleman, landlord, politician.

His mother, Jadwiga Sapieżyna, was a daughter of the 12th Ordynat of the Ordynacja Zamojska Count Stanisław Kostka Zamoyski.

In 1894, he became Head of the Exhibition Committee of the General National Exhibition in Lviv.

== Children ==
- Władysław Leon Sapieha (1853-1920) - husband of Countess Elżbieta Konstancja Potulicka, great-grandfather of Queen Mathilde of Belgium
- Maria Jadwiga Sapieha (1855-1929) - wife of Count Stanisław Żółtowski
- Leon Paweł Sapieha (1856-1893) - husband of Princess Teresa Elżbieta z Sanguszków-Kowelska
- Helena Maria Sapieha (1857-1947) - wife of Count Edward Adam Stadnicki
- Paweł Jan Sapieha (1860-1934) - first president of the Polish Red Cross, married to Matylda Paula Eleonora z Windisch-Graetzów
- Jan Piotr Sapieha (1865-1954) - husband of Alicja Probyn
- Adam Stefan Sapieha (1867-1951) - Cardinal-Archbishop Krakow, Poland

== Bibliography ==
- Obywatele Honorowi Królewskiego Wolnego Miasta Sanoka, Sanok 2002, s. 55-56.
