= Diet of Galicia and Lodomeria =

Regional parliament of Galicia within Austria 1861–1918

Diet of Galicia and Lodomeria: Polish: Sejm Krajowy; Ukrainian: Галицький Крайовий Сейм; German: Landtag von Galizien
- Coat of arms of the Kingdom of Galicia and Lodomeria

Type
- Type: Unicameral

History
- Founded: 1861
- Disbanded: 1918
- Preceded by: Estates of Galicia
- Succeeded by: Sejm of the Second Polish Republic

Leadership
- Monarch: Charles I (1916–1918)
- Marshal: Stanisław Niezabitowski (1914–1918)
- Seats: 161 (150 until 1900)

Elections
- Last election: 1913

Meeting place
- Diet Building; Lemberg (Polish: Lwów; Ukrainian: Lviv)

The Diet of the Kingdom of Galicia and Lodomeria, and of the Grand Duchy of Cracow was the regional assembly of the Kingdom of Galicia and Lodomeria, a crown land of the Austrian Empire, and later Austria-Hungary. In the history of the Polish parliaments, it is considered the successor of the former sejm walny, or general sejm of the Kingdom of Poland and the Polish–Lithuanian Commonwealth, and also of the sejmik, or local councils, in the territories of the Austrian Partition. It existed from 1861 until the dissolution of Austria-Hungary in 1918.

== Name ==
The multi-ethnic nature of the Kingdom resulted in the diet having multiple different names. In German, the lingua franca of Cisleithania (north-western part of the monarchy), it was called Landtag von Galizien und Lodomerien, meaning 'Diet of Galicia and Lodomeria'. In Polish, it was called either Sejm krajowy, meaning 'Sejm of the Land', or Sejm Lwowski, meaning 'Lwów Sejm'. In Ukrainian, it was called Га́лицький крайови́й сейм, transcribed Halytskyi krayovyi seim, meaning 'Sejm of the land of Galicia'.

Landtag is a German word that means 'regional assembly', or 'diet'. In Polish and Ukrainian, the word used was Sejm (the latter also used version Sojm).

== History ==
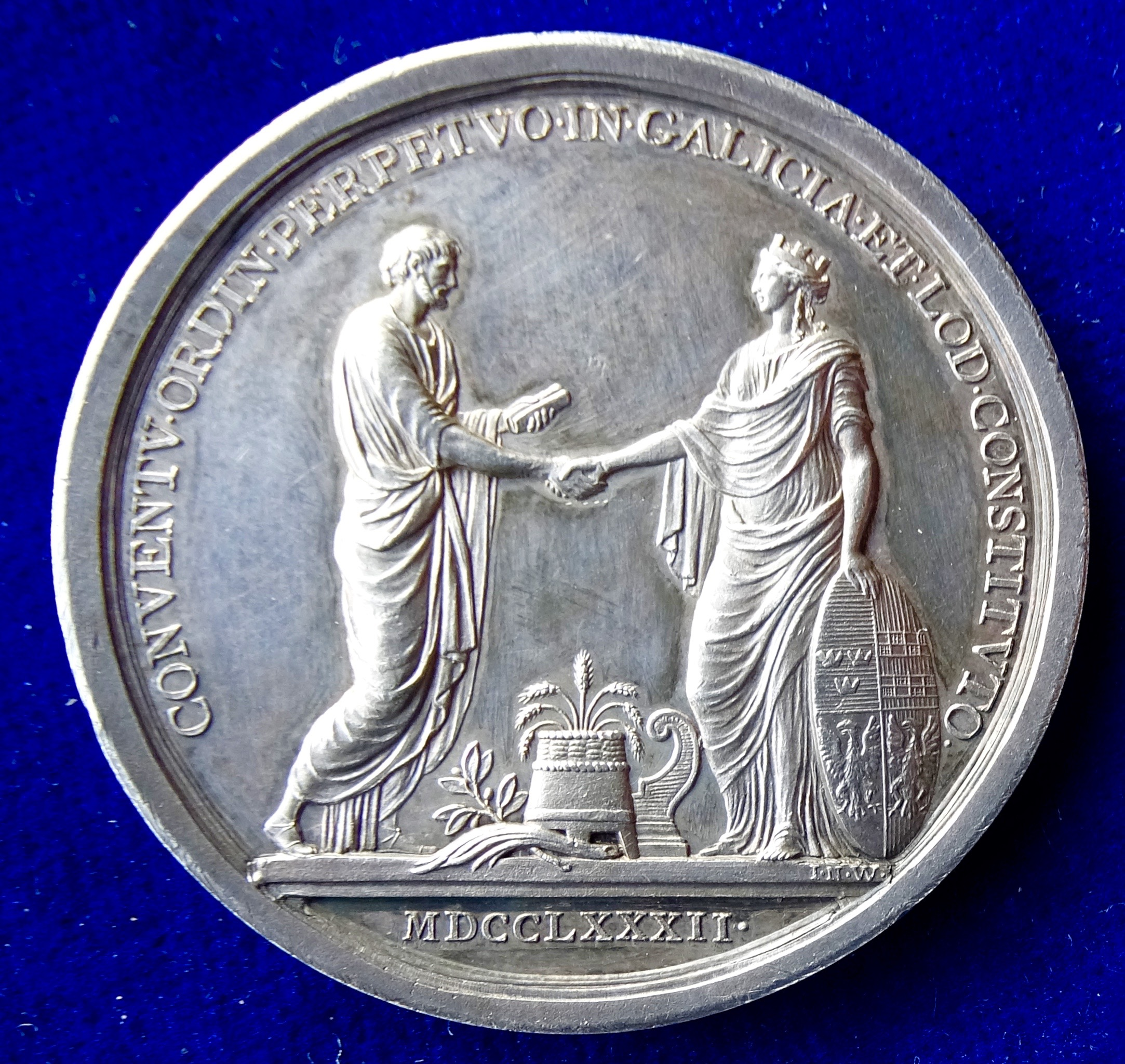
Medal of 1782 commemorating the constitution of the parliament in Galicia and Lodomeria by Joseph II, Holy Roman Emperor. It shows an allegorical depiction of imperial law (left) being handed over to the allegorical figure of Galicia with her shield showing the coat of arms of the lands

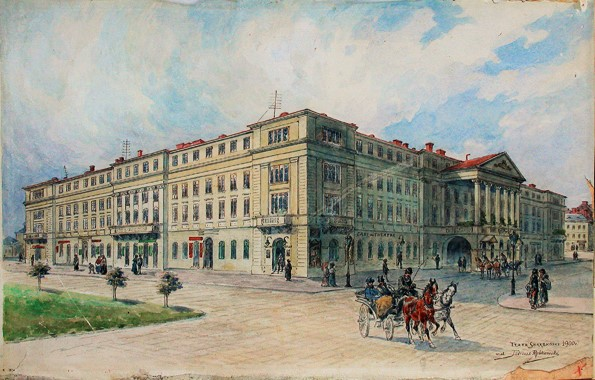
The former seat of the diet from 1861 to 1880, today the Maria Zankovetska Theatre

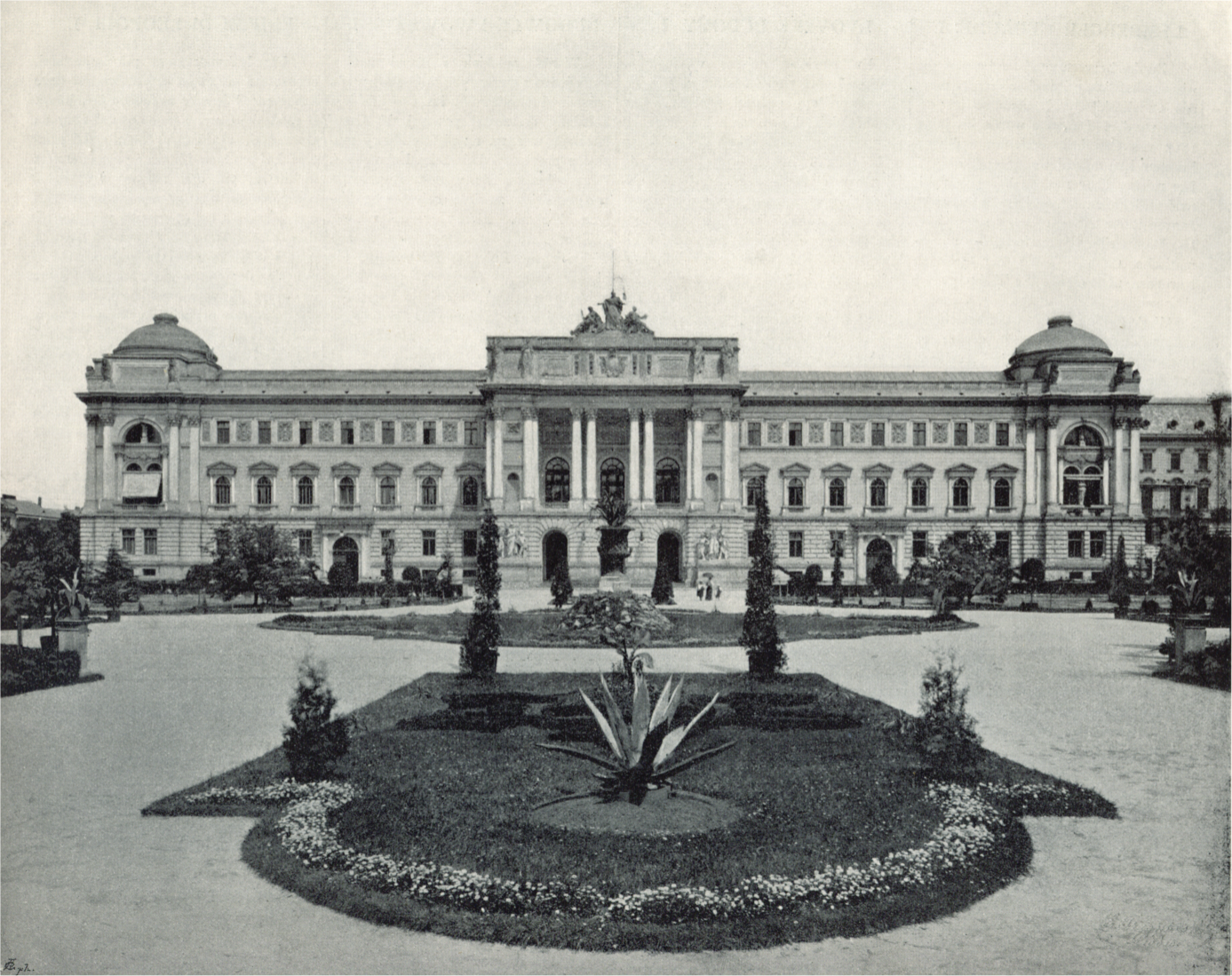
The seat of the Diet of Galicia from 1881 to 1918, currently owned by Lviv University

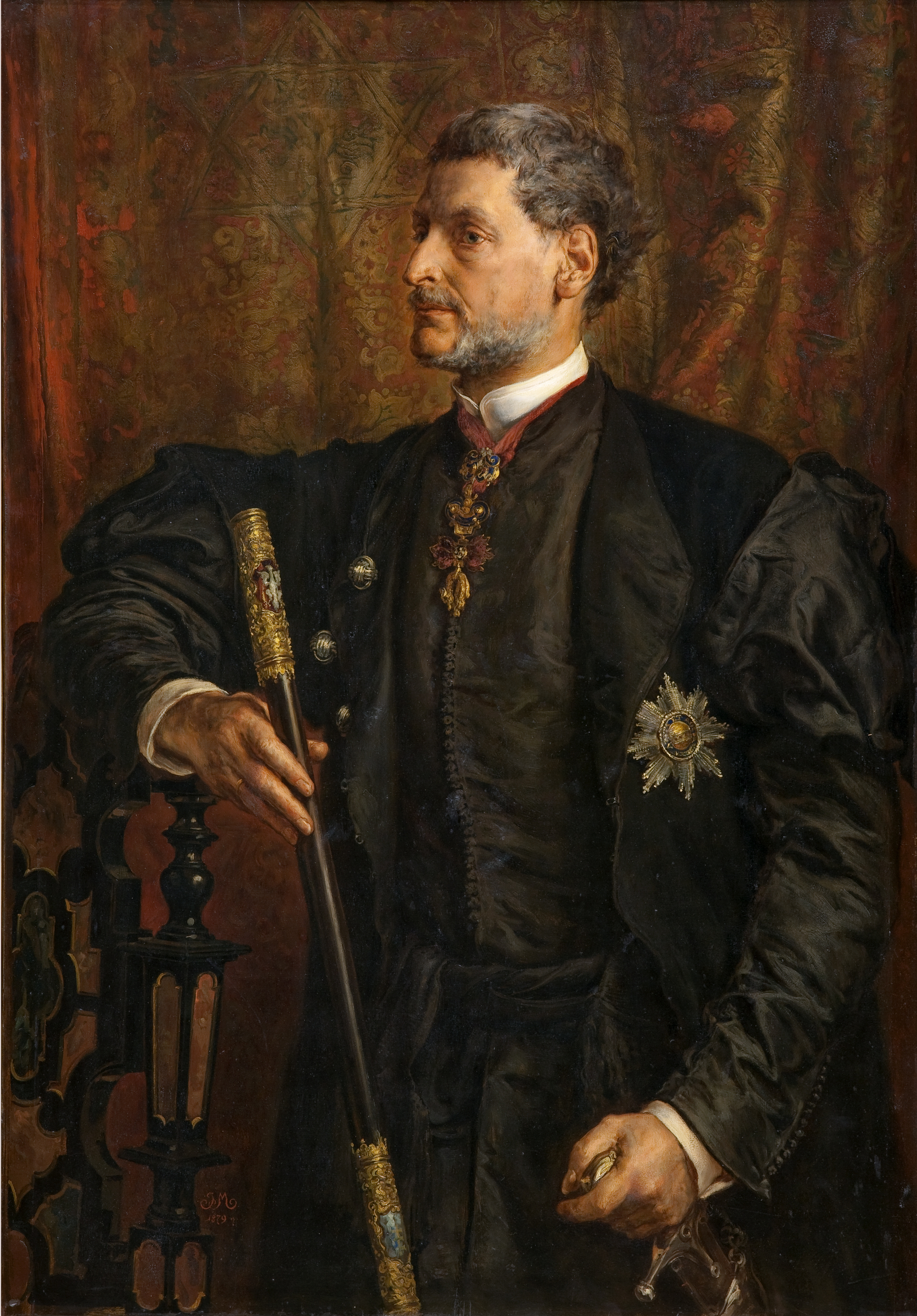
Duke Alfred Józef Potocki, Marshal of the Galician Sejm in 1875

Parts of the Polish–Lithuanian Commonwealth Lesser Poland territories were included in the Austrian partition as early as the First Partition of Poland in 1772. From about 1775 to 1848, with several gaps, the crown land of Galicia had a relatively powerless parliamentary body, known originally as the Postulate Sejm (Polish: sejm postulatowy), and from 1817, as Estates of Galicia (Polish: stany galicyjskie). The Diet of Galicia and Lodomeria, which was formed in 1861 following the promulgation of the October Diploma by Emperor Franz Joseph I, had more real power than its predecessors. In Polish parliamentary tradition, it is considered to have continued the history of the general sejm and regional sejmiks on the lands of Lesser Poland and Ruthenia.

The Diet was initially dominated by Polish nobles, but in time, it saw the emergence of a strong peasant faction. Another notable change over time included the emergence of a Ruthenian (modern Ukrainian) bloc, changing the balance of power within the body. Overall, the Diet preserved the Polish parliamentary tradition during a time in which it waned in the Prussian Partition and the Russian Partition, and saw the emergence of the major political parties and groupings that were to dominate the political life of the Second Polish Republic after World War I. The leader of the Polish peasant movement in the Second Polish Republic, Wincenty Witos, gained his experience in the Diet, elected for the first time in 1908. Similarly, the National Democrats, and the Polish socialists, had their political blocs in the diet around that time.

== Composition and organization ==
As established by the February Patent of 1861, the Diet was unicameral, and was made up of 150 deputies. All but nine were elected by four different "Curiae", or assemblies of the social classes. An electoral system based on curiae was also used in the Imperial Council of Cisleithania, until 1907.

- The Curia of the Landowners consisted of fifty-two electors chosen from amongst those people who owned land that had previously been owned by the feudal nobility, and paid at least 100 florins a year in tax. These electors had the right to elect forty-four deputies to the Diet.
- The Curia of the Chambers of Commerce consisted of thirty-nine electors from the chambers of commerce in Lwów, Kraków, and Brody. These electors had the right to elect three deputies, one from each city's chamber of commerce.
- The Curia of the Cities consisted of 2264 electors from important cities. The position of "elector" was granted based on status: those within the two-thirds highest tax bracket were eligible, and others became eligible on the basis of their education, or because they held an important office. Electors usually were members of the clergy, office workers, doctors, teachers at the high schools, and directors of primary schools. These electors had the right to elect twenty-three (increased to 26 in 1863; 31 in 1900) deputies to the Diet.
- The Curia of Other Municipalities consisted of 8764 electors from amongst small-scale rural landowners. There were two stages of voting for this curia. In the first stage, the suffrage was determined in the same manner as with the Curia of the Cities: those in the two-thirds highest tax bracket, with a high level of education, or an important office, were eligible. These voters elected the electors, who then elected seventy-four deputies to the Diet, each holding a constituency equivalent to a rural district.
- Nine deputies sat ex officio: two chancellors of universities, and seven archbishops and bishops. The initial nine were composed of three Greek Catholic bishops, three Roman Catholic bishops, and one Armenian Catholic bishop, along with representatives of Lemberg University and Kraków University. Three seats were added later: an additional Roman Catholic representative, one for the Lemberg Polytechnical University, and one for the Kraków Academy of Learning.

This system of limited suffrage caused the predominantly Polish landowning class to dominate the Diet. Whilst they only made up about 0.4% of the population, they held 28.2% of the seats in the Diet. Small-scale rural landowners, on the other hand, made up about 95% of the population, but held only 52.3% of the seats in Diet. This system also skewed representation for different ethnicities in the Diet. Whilst Ruthenians made up about 40% of the population of Galicia, they only held 15% of the seats in the Diet, as they lived primarily in rural communities. Reform of the suffrage system in late 1913 added a fifth curia for the upper peasantry, which had the right to elect twenty deputies. Due to the outbreak of the First World War, no further elections to the Diet took place, and hence the fifth curia existed only on paper.

Elections were not held on a regular schedule; they occurred usually every five to six years, upon Emperor's decree. Thus the deputies' term of office lasted about six years. The Diet had ten elections: 1861, 1867, 1870, 1877, 1883, 1889, 1889, 1895, 1901, 1908, and the final one, in 1913.

At first, the deputies met in the Skarbek Theatre (today Maria Zankovetska National Academic Ukrainian Drama Theater). From 1881, the Diet met in a newly constructed building designed by architect Juliusz Hochberger and with a program of architectural sculpture by Teodor Rygier. The building is now owned by the University of Lviv.

== Competences ==
In the period of 1861 to 1873, the Diet elected 38 representatives from among its deputies to be sent to the Imperial Council of Cisleithania.

The Diet had legislative powers. The legislative initiative was possessed by the Emperor, along with the Diet executive (six deputies and the Marshal), and all individual deputies. It could debate and pass laws related to many issues in the field of education, culture, welfare, justice, public works, administration, religion and military. It could also impose supplementary taxes, up to 10% of the direct tax.

=== Marshal and Vice-Marshal ===
The position of 'Marshal' was equivalent to the position of 'Speaker' in Westminster-style parliaments. The Marshal was considered the presiding officer of the Diet.

- Prince Leon Sapieha (April 11, 1861 – March 19, 1875)
  - Spiridon Lytvynovych (1861–1868)
  - Julian Lawriwsky (1869–1872)
  - Ivan Stupnytskyi (1873–1875)
- Count Alfred Józef Potocki (March 19 – December 1875)
  - Ivan Stupnytskyi (1875)
- Count Włodzimierz Dzieduszycki (March 7, 1876 – 1876)
  - Ivan Stupnytskyi (1875–1876)
- Count Ludwik Wodzicki (August 8, 1877 – 1881)
  - Ivan Stupnytskyi (1877–1881)
- Mikołaj Zyblikiewicz (September 14, 1881 – November 6, 1886)
  - Ivan Stupnytskyi (1881–1882)
  - Sylvester Sembratovych (1883–1886)
- Count Jan Tarnowski (November 18, 1886 – 1890)
  - Sylvester Sembratovych (1886–1890)
- Prince Eustachy Sanguszko (October 14, 1890 – September 24, 1895)
  - Sylvester Sembratovych (1890–1895)
- Count Stanisław Badeni (October 31, 1895 – October 7, 1901), 1st time
  - Sylvester Sembratovych (1895–1897)
  - Kostyantyn Chekhovych (1897–1901)
- Count Andrzej Kazimierz Potocki (October 9, 1901 – 1903)
  - Andrey Sheptytsky (1901–1903)
- Count Stanisław Badeni (June 26, 1903 – April 2, 1913), 2nd time
  - Andrey Sheptytsky (1903–1910)
  - Kostyantyn Chekhovych (1912)
  - Andrey Sheptytsky (1913)
- Adam Gołuchowski von Gołuchowo (December 5, 1913 – April 15, 1914)
  - Kostyantyn Chekhovych (1913–1914)
- Stanisław Niezabitowski (May 15, 1914 – November 1918)

== Notable members ==
Notable members of the Diet of Galicia and Lodomeria include:

- Dawid Abrahamowicz
- Stanisław M Badeni
- Michał Bobrzyński
- Jakub Bojko
- Julian A. Dunajewski
- Aleksander Fredro
- Adam Gołuchowski
- Agenor Gołuchowski
- Kazimierz Grocholski
- Stepan Kachala
- Hryhoriy Khomyshyn
- Stanisław Niezbitowski
- Anthony Petrushevych
- Eustachy Sanguszko
- Leon Sapieha
- Lonhyn Tsehelsky
- Franciszek Smolka
- Jan Stapiński
- Ludwik Wodzicki
- Hryhoriy Yakhymovych
- Filip Zaleski
- Wacław Artur Zaleski
- Mikołaj Zyblikiewicz
