= Stepan Kachala =

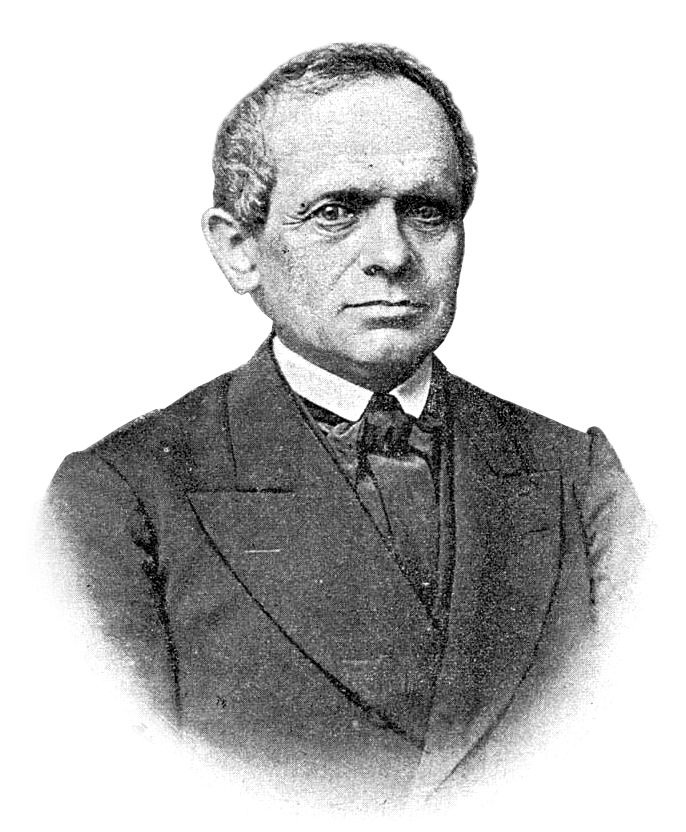
Stepan Kachala

Stepan Kachala (Ukrainian: Степан Качала, Polish: Stefan Kaczała) (1815 – 1888) was a Ukrainian priest politician and writer.

Born in Firlejów near Berezhany (now Lypivka in Rohatyn urban hromada, Ivano-Frankivsk Oblast), he graduated from a gymnasium in Berezhany and then the Lviv seminary. In 1842, he became a Greek-Catholic priest.

In the late 1860s Father Stepan made an inquiry into the causes of the Ukrainian peasants' poverty and then formulated a social program that the Greek Catholic clergy soon adopted. He did not find the roots of the peasant’s poverty where secular investigators have suggested these roots lay: in the inequitable terms of emancipation, in the transition to a money economy, and in the absence of factory industry to absorb the surplus labor in the countryside. Instead, Father Kachala found the peasant guilty of vices that led to his impoverishment: drunkenness, prodigality, and sloth. As antidotes to these vices, he suggested, among other things, abstinence, thrift, and enterprise.

From 1861, Rev Stepan Kachala was a Ukrainian representative to the Galician Sejm. In 1873-1879 he served as head of the Ruthenian Club (Ukrainian Руський клуб, Polish Klub Ruski) in the Austrian parliament.
