= Tomasz Franciszek Zamoyski =

Polish nobleman (1832–1889)

- Count
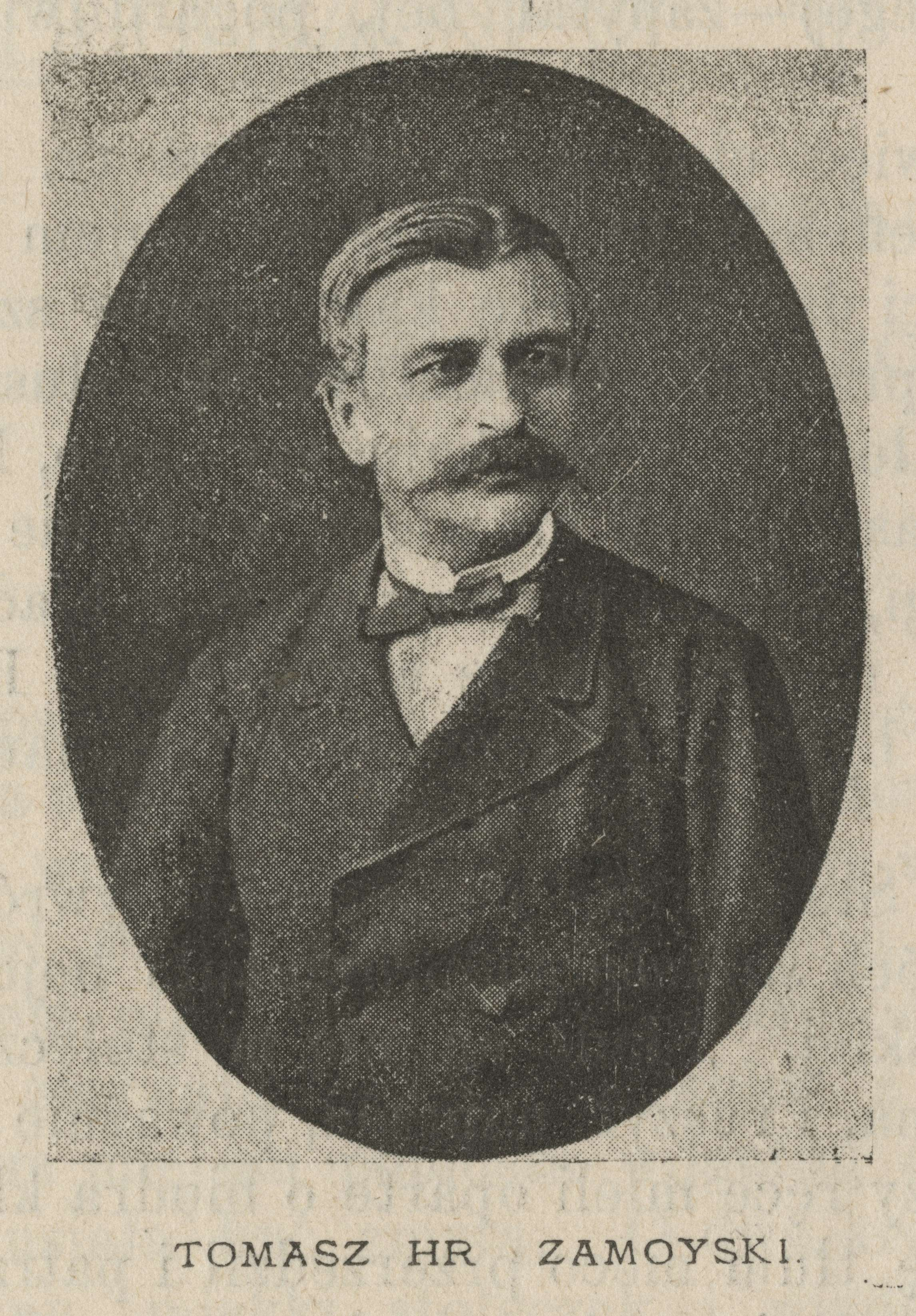
- Coat of arms: Jelita
- Born: 18 January 1832; Klemensów, Congress Poland, Russian Empire
- Died: 21 December 1889 (aged 57); San Remo, Italy
- Noble family: Zamoyski
- Consort: Maria Potocka
- Father: Konstanty Zamoyski
- Mother: Aniela Sapieha

Tomasz Franciszek Zamoyski (1832–1889) was a Polish nobleman (szlachcic) and the 14th ordynat of Zamość estate. His family title of count was recognized by Russia in 1884.

== Family ==
Tomasz Franciszek married Maria Potocka on 16 September 1869. They had six children together: Natalia Zamoyska, Maurycy Klemens Zamoyski (1871–1939), Franciszek Tomasz Zamoyski, Maria Zamoyska, Józefa Zamoyska and Józef Zamoyski (1880–1963). In 1924, his second son Maurycy Klemens Zamoyski became the Polish minister of foreign affairs.

== Career ==
As ordynat, Tomasz Zamoyski responsibilities in running the Zamość state included signing contracts with leaseholders of his land, the creation of settlements and farms, the management of the forest and other such obligations.

According to the Polish Museum of History, Tomasz Zamoyski was not politically active, but got involved in various public affairs for the benefit of his country. He was president of various companies including the Credit Society of Warsaw and an insurance company. He founded the "Przezorność" Life Insurance Society and was vice-president of the Management Board of the Terespol Railway.

He also got involved as a founder of the Museum of Industry and Agriculture, became the president of Horse Racing, as well as a member of numerous cultural and scientific societies, such as the Horticultural Society or the Warsaw Society Numismatic Circle. Tomasz Zamoyski also engaged in philanthropy through financial support among others of the Mianowski fund.

In 1868, Tomasz Zamoyski erected a new building designed by the architect Julian Ankiewicz for the Zamoyski Family Library (pl), abbreviated as BOZ in Polish, and appointed the poet Gustaw Ehrenberg as librarian and the archivist Leopold Hubert as plenipotentiary.

In 1884, Tomasz Franciszek Zamoyski's family title of count was recognized by Russia.

In 1889, Tomasz Franciszek Zamoyski died at the age of 57 in Sanremo, Italy.

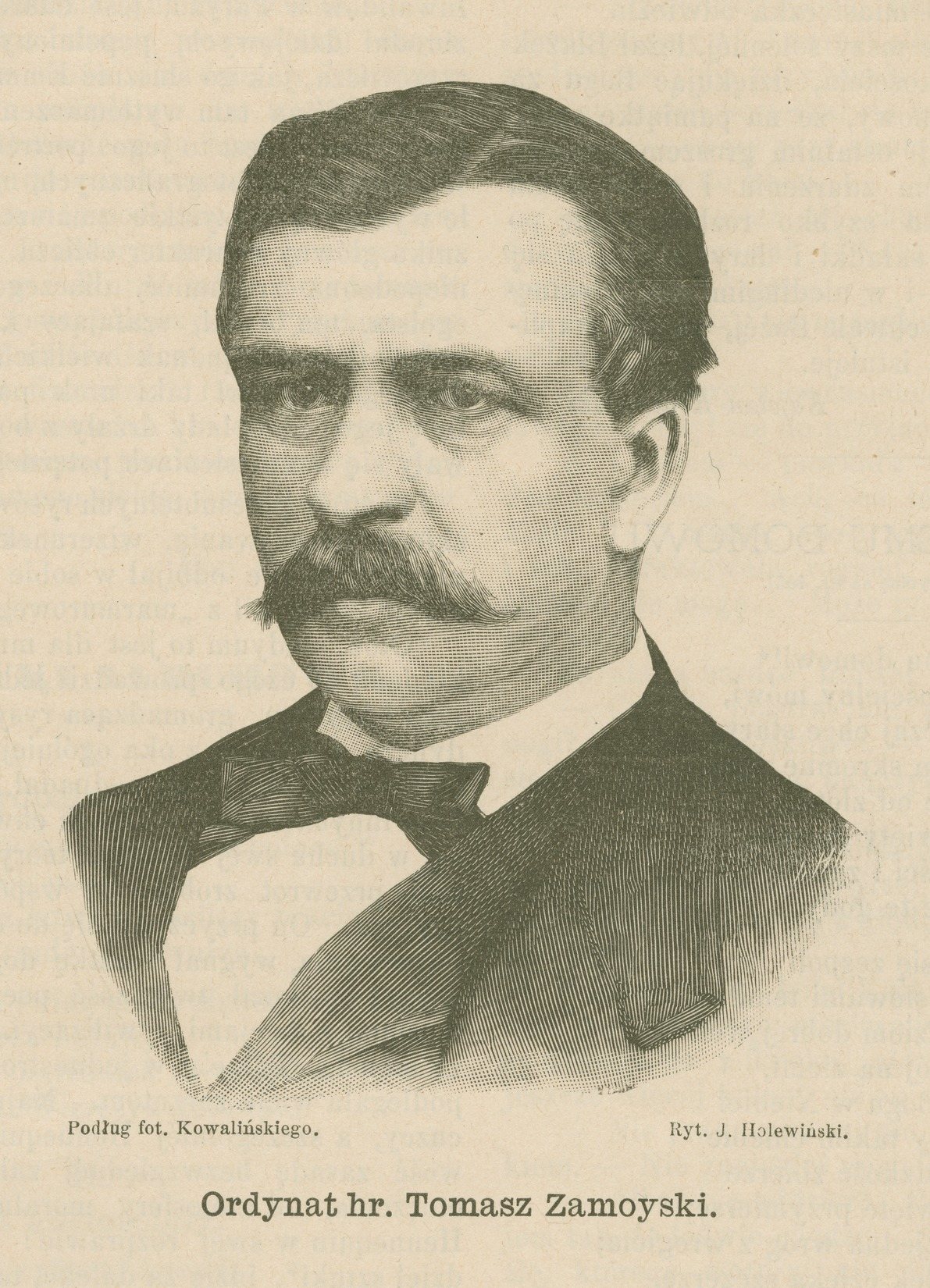
Count Ordynat Tomasz Franciszek Zamoyski. Photo by Kowalski: Ryt. J. Holewiński

Coat of Arms of the Zamoyski family

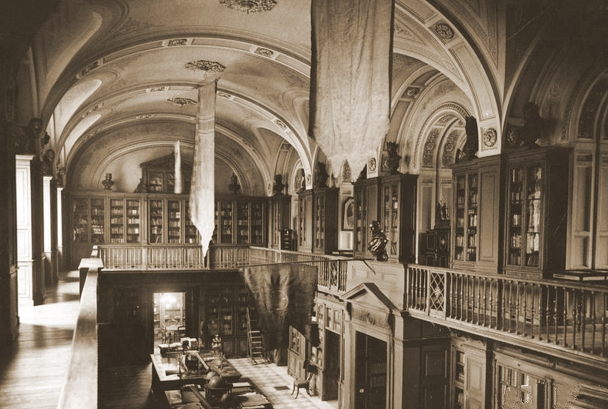
Interior of the main hall of Zamoyski Family Library in Warsaw. Image from 1932

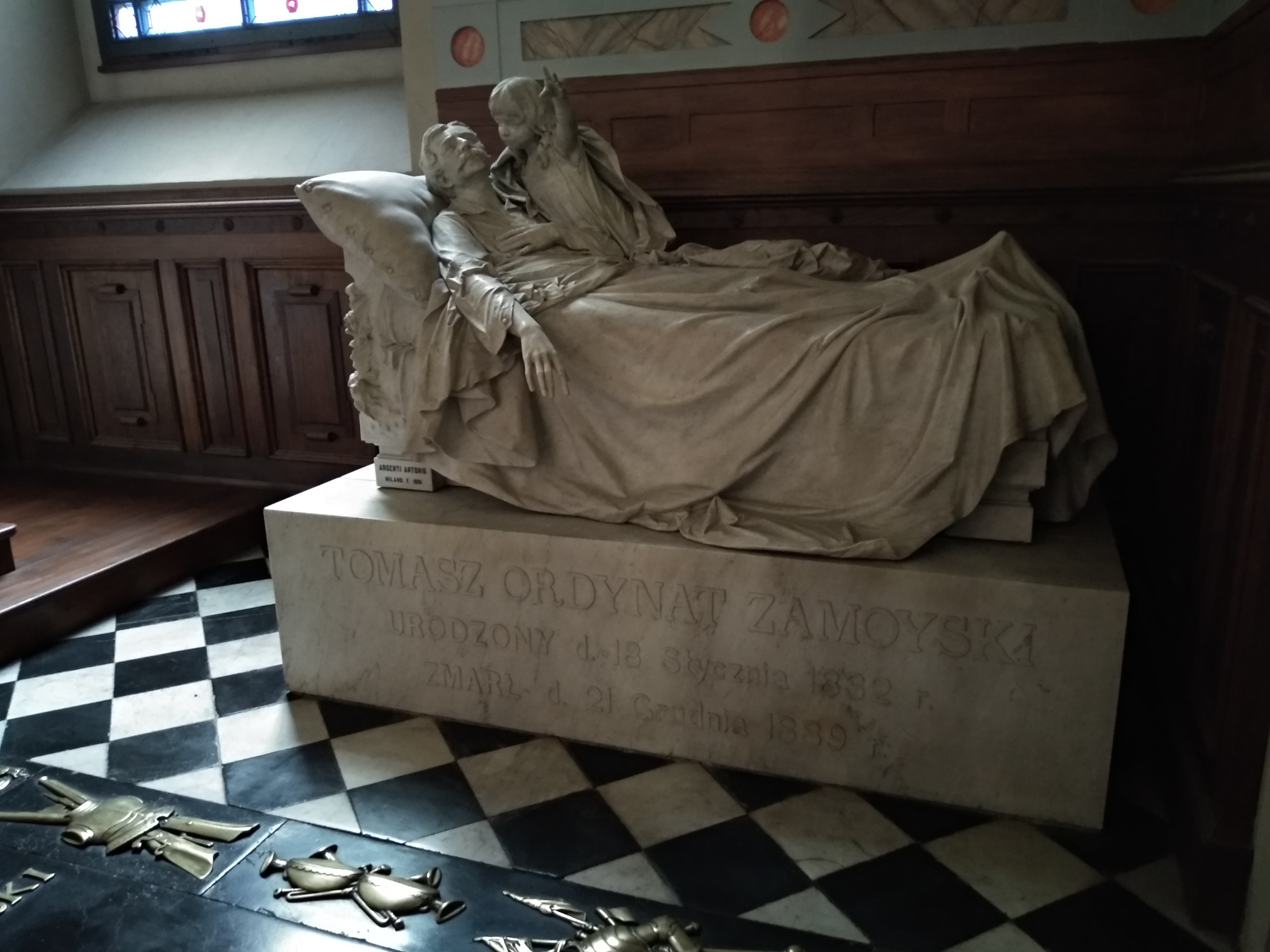
Tombstone of Tomasz Franciszek Zamoyski
