= Zdzisław Zamoyski =

Polish nobleman (1810–1855)

- Count
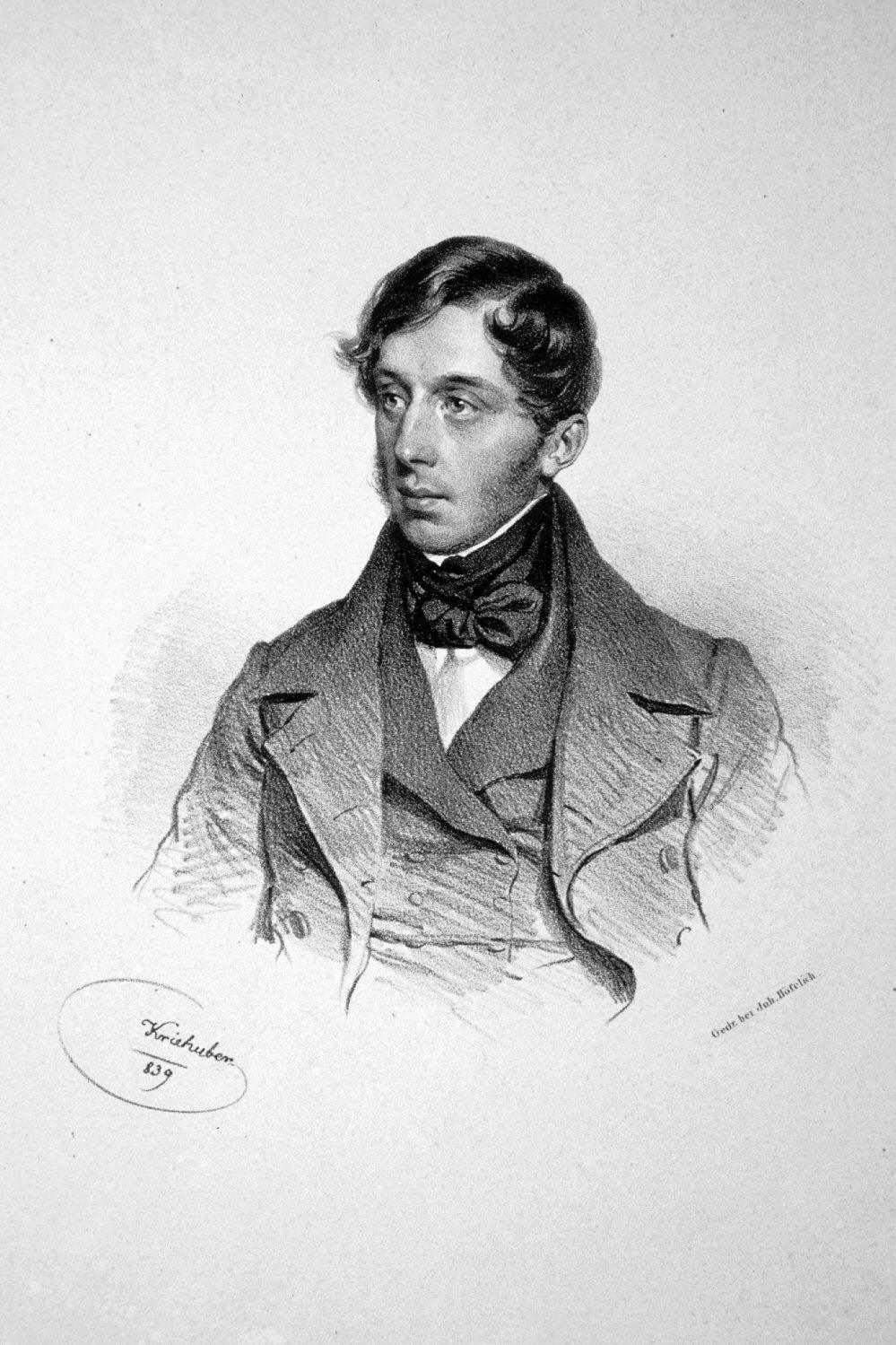
- Count Zdislaw Zamoyski, Lithograph by Josef Kriehuber, 1839
- Coat of arms: Jelita
- Born: 28 January 1810; Warsaw, Duchy of Warsaw
- Died: 13 August 1855 (aged 45); Vienna, Austrian Empire
- Noble family: Zamoyski
- Consort: Józefina Walicka
- Father: Count Stanisław Kostka Zamoyski
- Mother: Princess Zofia Czartoryska

Count Zdzisław Jan Andrzej Zamoyski (28 January 1810 – 13 August 1855) was a Polish nobleman and landowner.

Zdzisław married Józefina Walicka hr. Łada on 6 April 1834. They had four children together: Stefan Zamoyski, Zofia Zamoyska, Maria Zamoyska and Wanda Zamoyska.

He was owner of the estates in Wysock, Bobówka, Mała Wieś, Korzenica and Moszczanica. He was awarded the Gold Cross of the Virtuti Militari on 25 May 1831 during the November Uprising.
