= Konstanty Zamoyski =

Polish nobleman (1799–1866)

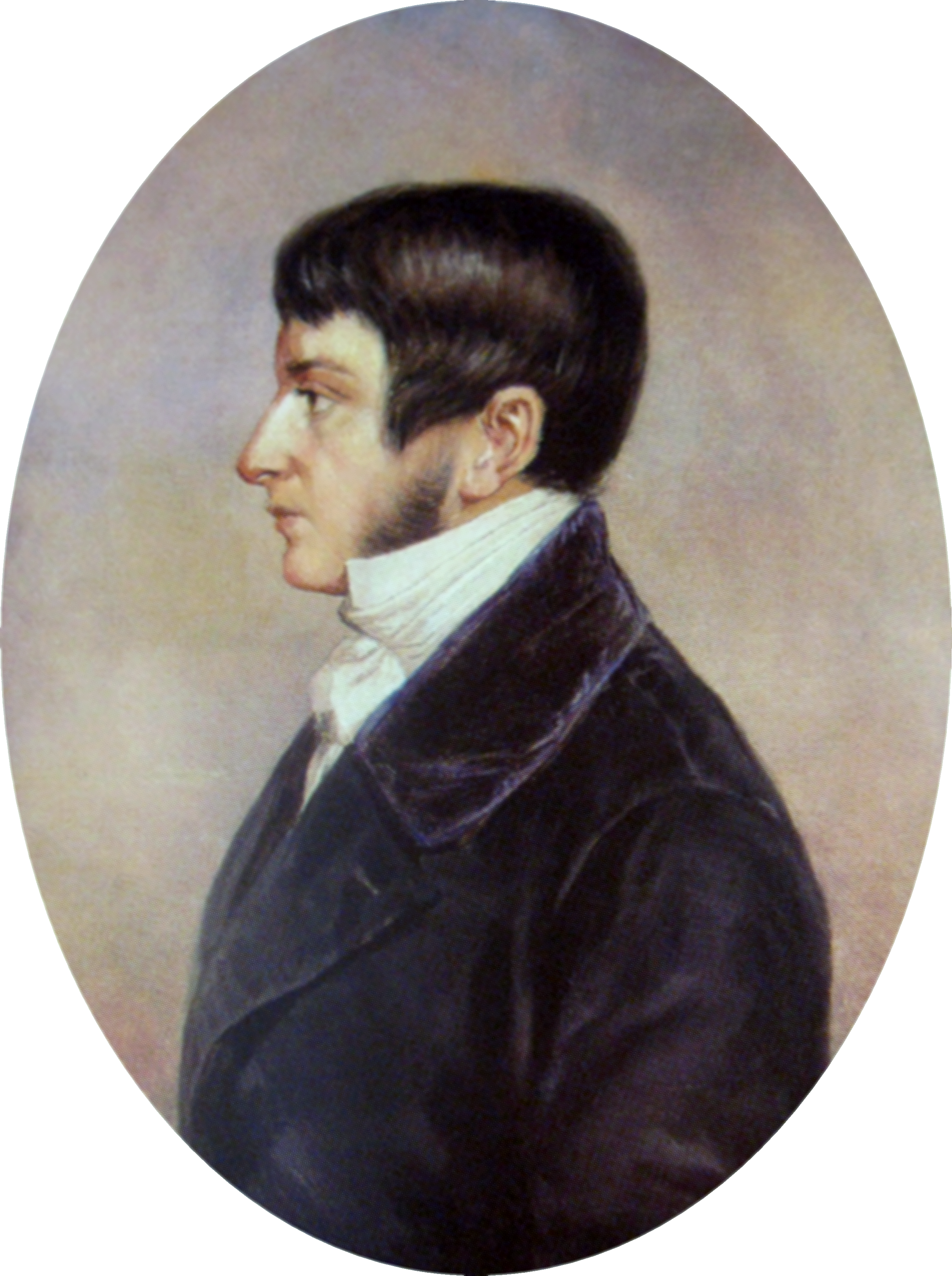
- Coat of arms: Jelita
- Born: 9 April 1799; Vienna, Archduchy of Austria, Holy Roman Empire
- Died: 9 January 1866 (aged 66); London, England, United Kingdom
- Family: Zamoyski
- Consort: Aniela Sapieha
- Issue: Jan Zamoyski; Maria Zamoyska; Pelagia Zamoyska; Tomasz Franciszek Zamoyski; Karol Franciszek Zamoyski; Józef Zamoyski
- Father: Stanisław Kostka Zamoyski
- Mother: Zofia Czartoryska

Konstanty Zamoyski (9 April 1799 - 9 January 1866) was a Polish nobleman (szlachcic) from Zamoyski family.

Konstanty became the 13th Ordynat of Zamość estate and was Chamberlain on the royal court in Russia. Since 1834 he has been a member of the State Commission for Debt Service of the Congress Poland. He married Princess Aniela Sapieha on 19 April 1827. He passed the law of antiquity in Poland. The law was repealed soon after his death.
