= Stanisław Kostka Zamoyski =

Polish nobleman (1775–1856)

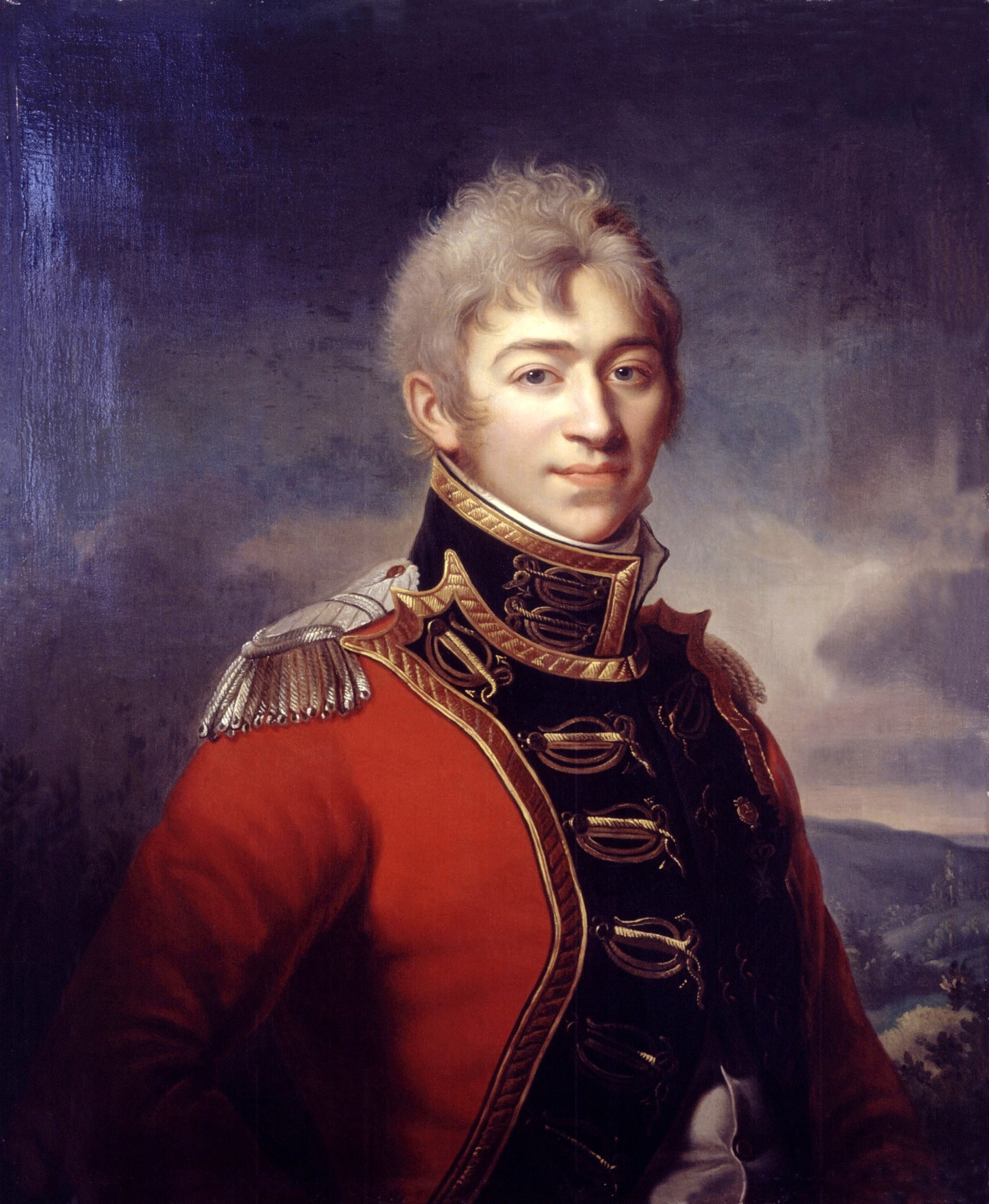
- Born: 13 January 1775; Warsaw, Polish–Lithuanian Commonwealth
- Died: 2 April 1856 (aged 81); Vienna, Austrian Empire
- Noble family: Zamoyski
- Spouse: Zofia Czartoryska
- Issue: Konstanty Zamoyski; Andrzej Artur Zamoyski; Jan Zamoyski; Władysław Stanisław Zamoyski; Celina Gryzelda Zamoyska; Jadwiga Klementyna Zamoyska; Zdzisław Zamoyski; Eliza Elżbieta Zamoyska
- Father: Andrzej Zamoyski
- Mother: Konstancja Czartoryska

Count Stanisław Kostka Zamoyski of Herb Jelita (13 January 1775 – 2 April 1856) was a Polish nobleman (szlachcic), politician, landowner, and patron of arts. By birth he was a member of the House of Zamoyski.

== Biography ==
Stanisław was the 12th Ordynat of Zamość estates. In 1809 he became the chairman of the "Provisional Government" (rzad tymczasowy) of Galicia. He was Senator-Voivode of the Duchy of Warsaw and the Polish (Congress) Kingdom from 1810 until 1831. He founded the Zamoyski Ordynacja Library and was chairman of the "Agricultural Society". He was awarded the Order of the White Eagle on 16 June 1812. In 1822 Stanisław became the chairman of the Senate in the Polish (Congress) Kingdom.

He married Princess Zofia Czartoryska on 20 May 1798 in Puławy.

During the November Uprising in 1831, Zamoyski was not present at the senate meeting and was subsequently removed from the senate by that year's parliament.

== Awards ==
- Honorary member of the Warsaw Society of Friends of Learning, awarded in 1811
- Member of the Order of the White Eagle, awarded on 16 June 1812
- Knight of the Order of St. Stanislaus, awarded in 1812
