= Stefan Zamoyski =

Polish nobleman (1837–1899)

Count Stefan Zamoyski
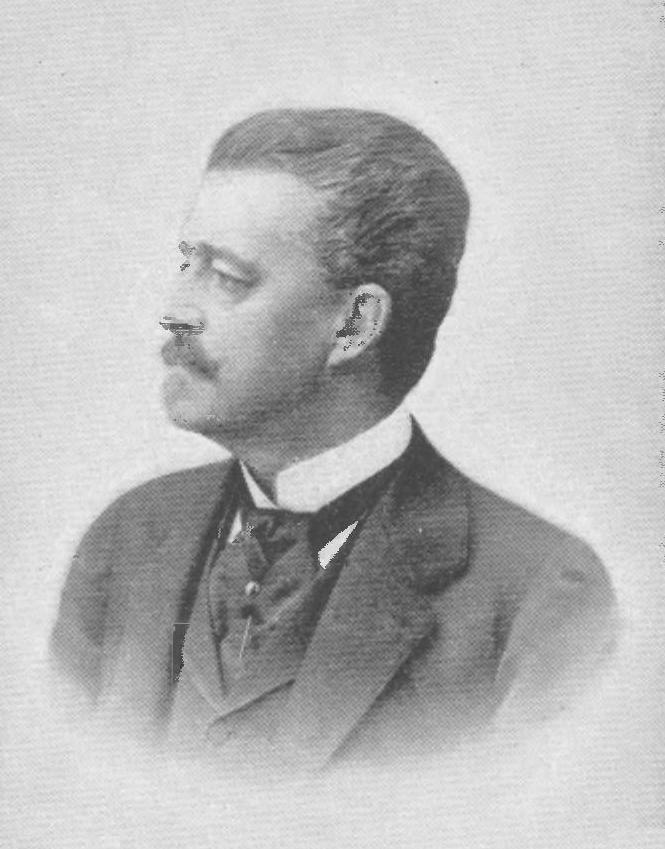
- Coat of arms: Jelita
- Born: 7 September 1837; Florence, Grand Duchy of Tuscany
- Died: 1 January 1899 (aged 61); Paris, France
- Noble family: Zamoyski
- Consort: Zofia Potocka
- Father: Zdzislaw Zamoyski
- Mother: Józefina Walicka

Count Stefan Zamoyski (1837–1899) was a Polish nobleman (szlachcic). Stefan was member of the Sejm in Galicia and owner of Wysocko, Baranów and Kłuszyn estates.

He was the only son of Zdzisław and Józefa from Walicki. He married Zofia Potocka on 24 August 1870 in Krzeszowice. They had five children together: Adam Zdzisław Zamoyski, Władysław Zdzisław Zamoyski, Zygmunt Zamoyski, Zofia Zamoyska, Katarzyna Zamoyska and Wanda Zamoyska.

In 1899, he died in Paris.
