= Ruthenian sobor =

1848 political committee in Lviv

Ruthenian sobor, or Ruthenian Congress (Ukrainian: Руський cобор) was a Polonophile Political Committee, based in Lviv and created on May 23, 1848 by Polish nobleman of Ukrainian origin "in the name of supporting harmony and unity in peace Motherland". Ruthenian sobor had 64 members strongly opposed the Polish-Ukrainian administrative partition of Galicia (Eastern and Western Galicia) and collaborated with the Polish People's Council. Ruthenian sobor was opposite of the Supreme Ruthenian Council. It operated during the Spring of Nations time, and was dissolved with the reestablishment of the government control by fall that year.

Its leaders were Leon Sapieha, A., J., and Włodzimierz Dzieduszycki, and J. and L. Jabłonowski.
