= Leon Sapieha =

Galician noble and statesman (1803–1878)

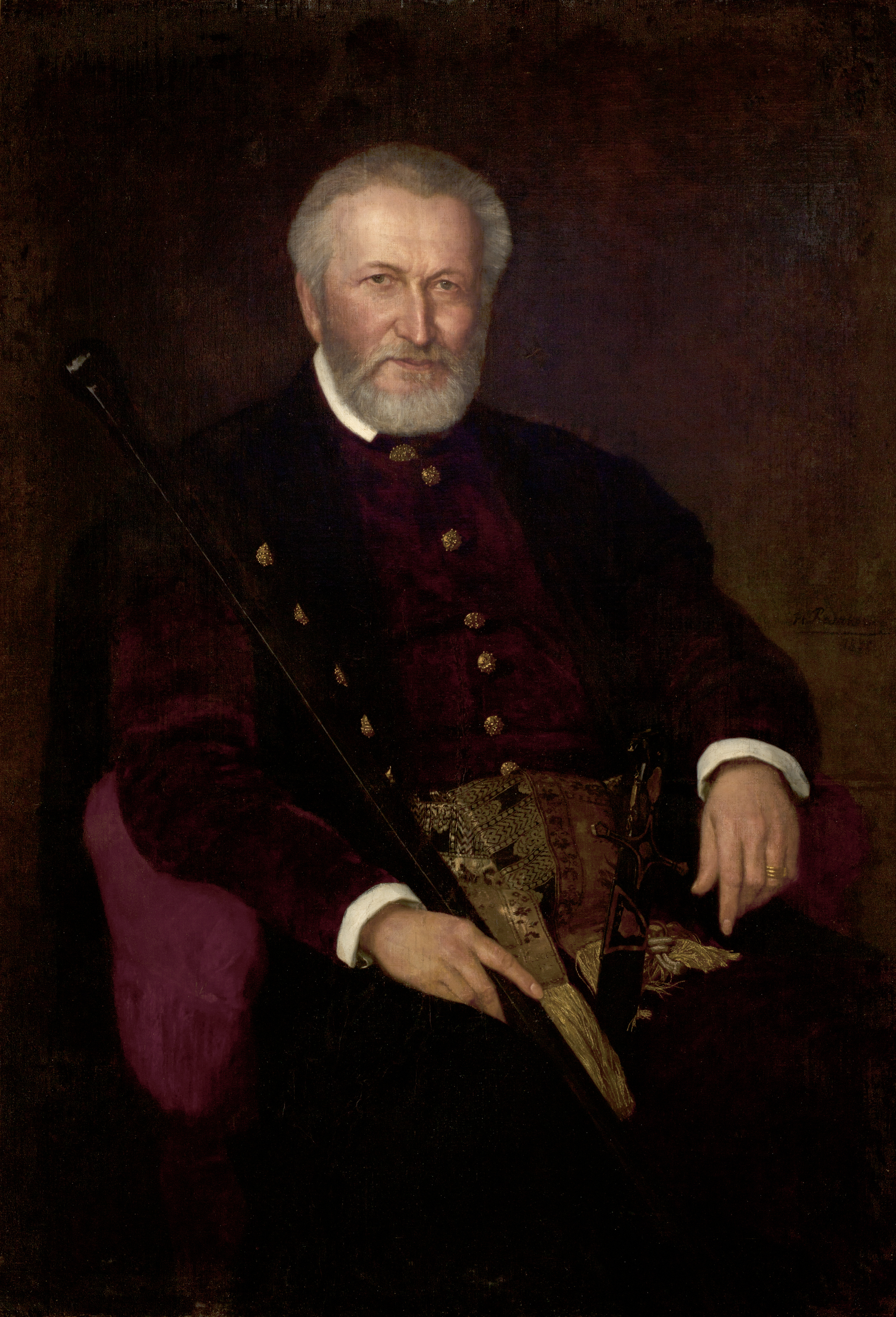
- Portrait of Sapieha by Henryk Rodakowski, 1878
- Coat of arms: Lis
- Born: 18 September 1803; Warsaw, South Prussia, Kingdom of Prussia
- Died: 1 September 1878 (aged 74); Krasiczyn, Kingdom of Galicia and Lodomeria, Austria-Hungary
- Noble family: Sapieha
- Spouse: Jadwiga Klementyna Zamoyska
- Issue: Princess Cecylia Celestyna Sapieha; Prince Adam Stanislaw Sapieha; Princess Jadwiga Sapieha; Princess Maria Zofia Sapieha; Wlodzimierz Sapieha; Princess Zofia Sapieha; Prince Leon Sapieha; Princess Teresa Sapieha; Wladyslaw Sapieha
- Father: Aleksander Antoni Sapieha
- Mother: Anna Zamoyska

Leon Sapieha (18 September 1803–1 September 1878) was a Galician noble (szlachcic) and statesman.

== Biography ==
Leon was born and educated in Warsaw, and studied law and economics in Paris and Edinburgh from 1820 to 1824. He began to work in the administration in the Polish (Congress) Kingdom. After the outbreak of the November Uprising in 1830, he left Russian Empire and took part in diplomatic missions of the Polish National Government in France and Great Britain. After that, he returned and participated in the Uprising in the rank of an Artillery Captain, among others in the defence of Warsaw on 6 and 7 September. He was awarded for that the Virtuti Militari Order. After the collapse of the Uprising he settled in Galicia, then part of the Austrian Empire. In 1835 Russian authorities confiscated his estates in Congress Poland as punishment for his participation in the failed Uprising. Leon Sapieha was one of the leaders of the Ruthenian sobor.

He was a member of "National movement" circles and held contacts with the "Hotel Lambert". He became a member of the National Sejm (Diet of Galicia) in the Austro-Hungarian province of Galicia, member of the Austrian Council of the State and member of the imperial Herrenhaus in 1861. In 1863 he didn't participate in the January Uprising in Russian-occupied Poland, but contributed towards it financially. From 1861 until 1875 he served as Sejm Marshal. In 1875, he retired from political life.

During his career he devoted much energy to agitating for the development of railways in Galicia, believing this to be central to the development of the region and the lives of its mostly Polish inhabitants. In 1858 after years of struggling to secure support in Vienna for his plans he was able to initiate the construction of the Carl Ludwig railway line connecting the railhead at Kraków with Lviv and Brody and linking Galicia with the rest of Europe.

== Legacy ==
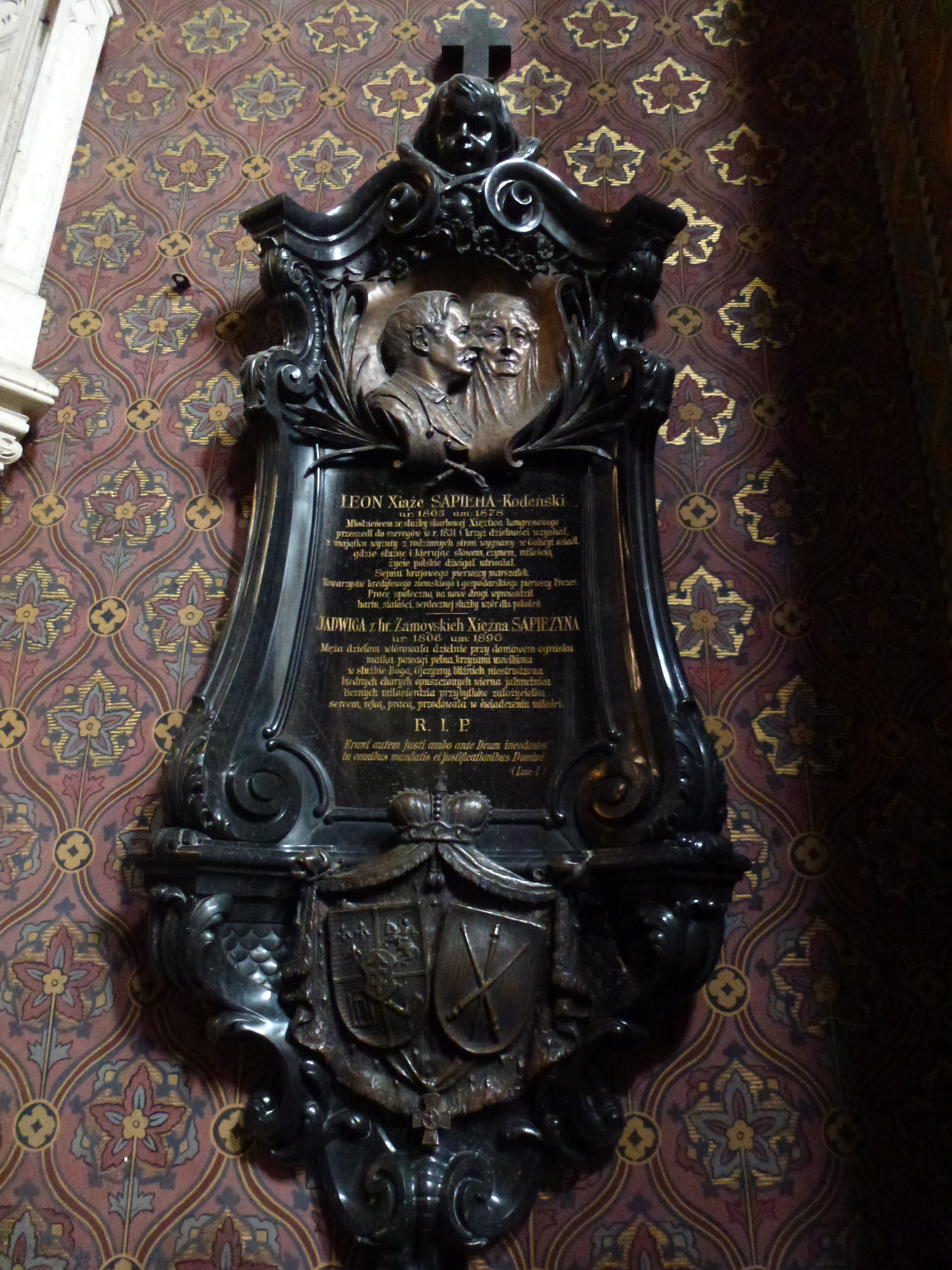
Memorial plaque to Leon and his wife in the Latin Cathedral in Lviv

In 1869, the city of Stanislau (now Ivano-Frankivsk) named its street after him, ulica Sapiezinskego (now Independence Street), which carried its name until the start of World War II.

== Bibliography ==
- Sapieha Leon, Wspomnienia z lat 1803–1863, Lwów 1914.
