= List of tuberculosis cases =

== Writers and poets ==
- Agha Ahmad Ali (1839–1873), Bengali academic, scholar of Persian and Urdu poet, died of tuberculosis in June 1873
- Maksim Bahdanovič, Belarusian poet, died from tuberculosis
- Manuel Bandeira, Brazilian poet, had tuberculosis in 1904 and expressed the effects of the disease in his life in many of his poems
- Gustavo Adolfo Bécquer, Spanish poet, died on 22 December 1870 from tuberculosis
- Vissarion Belinsky, Russian literary critic
- Edward Bellamy (1850–1898), fiction writer remembered for his book Looking Backward, died from tuberculosis
- Sukanta Bhattacharya, Bengali poet and playwright
- Jonas Biliūnas
- Rachel Bluwstein
- Randolph Bourne, at age 4, he developed tuberculosis of the spine, which left him with a hunchback
- Anne and Emily Brontë and other members of the Brontë family of writers, poets and painters were struck by tuberculosis. Anne, their brother Branwell, and Emily all died of it within two years of each other. Charlotte Brontë's death in 1855 was stated at the time as having been due to tuberculosis, but there is some controversy over this today.
- Charles Brockden Brown
- Charles Farrar Browne
- Elizabeth Barrett Browning, poet, died of tuberculosis in 1861
- Jean de Brunhoff
- Charles Bukowski (1920–1994), American author and poet, contracted tuberculosis in 1988; he recovered, losing 60 lbs. He died of leukemia.
- Robert Burns
- Albert Camus, French writer, playwright, activist, and absurdist philosopher, suffered from tuberculosis. He was forced to drop out of school (University of Algiers) due to severe attacks of tuberculosis. However, his death was caused by a car accident.
- Gaius Valerius Catullus (ca. 84 BC – ca. 54 BC), Roman poet
- Anton Chekhov (1860–1904), Russian short-story writer, playwright and physician; died from tuberculosis
- Tristan Corbière
- Stephen Crane
- Gilles Deleuze (1925–1995)
- René Daumal
- Nikolay Dobrolyubov
- Laura Don (1852–1886), actress-manager, playwright and artist
- Paul Laurence Dunbar
- Sara Jeannette Duncan (1861–1922), Canadian author and journalist
- Paul Éluard
- Friedrich Robert Faehlmann
- Kahlil Gibran (1883–1931), Lebanese-American writer, poet, and visual artist
- Maxim Gorky
- Guido Gozzano (1883-1916), Italian poet
- Dashiell Hammett (1894–1961), American author and creator of the "hard boiled" detective novel (notably, Sam Spade in The Maltese Falcon), contracted tuberculosis during World War I
- Saima Harmaja, Finnish poet and writer
- Jaroslav Hašek
- Alice Corbin Henderson (1881–1949), American poet, author, and poetry editor
- Robert A. Heinlein, American author
- William Ernest Henley (1849–1903), English poet, writer, critic, and editor
- Mary Eliza Herbert (1829–1872), Canadian publisher and poet
- Sarah Herbert (1824–1846), Irish-Nova Scotian author, publisher, and educator
- Miguel Hernandez
- Washington Irving
- Takuboku Ishikawa
- Panait Istrati
- Helen Hunt Jackson
- Alfred Jarry
- Samuel Johnson
- Franz Kafka (1883–1924), German-language novelist best known for his novel The Trial, died from tuberculosis
- Uuno Kailas, Finnish composer
- Andreas Karkavitsas, Greek writer
- John Keats (1795–1821), English Romantic poet; he and his brother Tom were taken by tuberculosis
- Dragotin Kette
- Søren Aabye Kierkegaard (1813–1855), Danish philosopher
- Charles Kingsley
- Kostas Krystallis, Greek poet
- Vincas Kudirka (1858–1899), Lithuanian poet and physician; died from tuberculosis
- Jules Laforgue (1860–1887), French-Uruguayan poet
- Sidney Lanier
- D. H. Lawrence
- Janet Lewis
- Lu Xun
- Betty MacDonald
- Katherine Mansfield, New Zealand writer, died from tuberculosis aged 34
- William Somerset Maugham
- Sara Haardt Mencken
- Migjeni, Albanian poet
- Molière
- Christian Morgenstern, German writer
- Josip Murn Aleksandrov
- Novalis, German author and philosopher
- Jessie Fremont O'Donnell (1860–1897), writer
- Eugene O'Neill
- George Orwell (1903–1950), British author of Nineteen Eighty-Four, Animal Farm and Homage to Catalonia, first suffered tuberculosis in the early 1930s and died from it in 1950, at the age of 46. Nineteen Eighty-Four was written during his final illness.
- Walker Percy
- Kristjan Jaak Peterson (1801–1822), Estonian poet, the founder of modern Estonian poetry; died from tuberculosis, lived only to age 21
- Petar II Petrović-Njegoš
- Andrei Platonov
- Virginia Eliza Clemm Poe (wife of Edgar Allan Poe)
- Maria Polydouri, Greek poet and novelist
- Alexander Pope
- Eleanor Anne Porden
- Llewelyn Powys
- Winthrop Mackworth Praed
- Sholem Rabinovich
- Branko Radičević
- Lynn Riggs
- Joachim Ringelnatz, German poet
- John Ruskin
- Albert Samain
- Kaarlo Sarkia (1902–1945), Finnish poet
- Friedrich Schiller
- Masaoka Shiki (1867–1902), Japanese poet famous for revitalizing the haiku, died after a long struggle with tuberculosis
- Emily Shore, diarist
- Anna Sissak-Bardizbanian, reporter
- Juliusz Słowacki
- Hristo Smirnenski
- Tobias Smollett
- Laurence Sterne
- Robert Louis Stevenson (1850–1894), Neo-romantic Scottish essayist, novelist and poet, is thought to have suffered from tuberculosis during much of his life. He spent the winter of 1887–1888 recuperating from a presumed bout of tuberculosis at Dr. E.L. Trudeau's Adirondack Cottage Sanitarium in Saranac Lake, New York.
- Alan Sillitoe
- Edith Södergran (1892–1923), Finnish poet
- A. H. Tammsaare (1878–1940), Estonian writer; suffered from tuberculosis after 1911
- Francis Thompson
- Henry David Thoreau
- Lesya Ukrainka
- Katri Vala (1901-1944), Finnish poet
- Esther Vanhomrigh
- Jessamyn West, American author, contracted tuberculosis in 1932 and recovered
- Yvor Winters
- Thomas Wolfe (1900–1938), American author, died of tuberculosis of the brain. His 1929 novel, Look Homeward, Angel, makes several references to the problem of consumption, though Wolfe's condition appeared rather suddenly in 1937.
- Jiří Wolker
- Simone Weil, French philosopher
- Walt Whitman (1819–1892) Autopsy "consumption of the right lung, general miliary tuberculosis"
- Vũ Trọng Phụng (1912-1939), Vietnamese author, poet.

== Actors ==
- Renée Adorée, (1898–1933), French actress
- Anita Berber (1899–1928) German dancer and actress
- Colin Clive (1900–1937), British stage and screen actor
- Georgiana Drew Barrymore (1856–1893), actress, succumbed aged 36
- Rachel Félix (1821-1858), French actress
- Vivien Leigh (1913–1967), British actress of stage and screen, died from complications of tuberculosis
- Annie Lewis (c. 1869–1896), musical comedy actress
- Dick Martin (1922–2008), comedian; lost a lung due to tuberculosis as a teenager
- Tim Moore (1887–1958), American actor of stage, screen and television
- Barry Morse (1918–2008), British-Canadian actor of stage, screen, and radio
- Mabel Normand (1893–1930), American silent film actress, screenwriter, director, producer, and comedian
- N!xau (1944–2003), Namibian actor
- Michael Raffetto
- Christiaan Van Vuuren (1982– ), Australian actor, writer, director and video blogger

== Artists ==
- Ioannis Altamouras (1852–1878), Greek painter
- Frédéric Bartholdi (1834–1904), French sculptor, creator of the Statue of Liberty
- Marie Bashkirtseff (1858–1884), Russian-born, French-educated painter and diarist, died from tuberculosis at the age of 26
- Aubrey Beardsley (1872–1898), English illustrator and author
- Richard Parkes Bonington (1802–1828) English Romantic landscape painter
- Kenneth M. Chapman (1875–1968), American art historian
- Harry Clarke (1889–1931), Irish stained glass artist and book illustrator
- Eugène Delacroix (1798–1863), French Romantic painter
- Wyatt Eaton (1849–1896), Canadian-American painter
- Rötger Feldmann (1950– ), German comic book artist
- Théodore Géricault (1791–1824), French Romantic painter, died at age 32.
- Mark Gertler (1891–1939), British painter
- Thomas Girtin (1775–1802), English watercolourist and etcher
- James Dickson Innes (1887–1914), Welsh painter
- Boris Kustodiev (1878–1927), Russian painter and stage designer
- Georges Lacombe (1868–1916), French sculptor and painter
- Charles Laval (1862–1894), French painter
- John Gaw Meem (1894–1983), American architect
- Datus Myers (1879–1960), American painter
- Amedeo Modigliani (1884–1920), Italian modernist painter
- Norval Morrisseau (1932–2007), Indigenous Canadian artist
- Edvard Munch (1863–1944), Norwegian painter
- Kārlis Padegs (1911–1940), Latvian painter
- José Pancetti (1902–1958), Brazilian modernist painter
- Paulus Potter (1625–1654), Dutch painter
- William Ranney (1813–1857), 19th-century American painter
- Slava Raškaj (1877–1906), Croatian painter
- Andrei Ryabushkin (1861–1904), Russian painter
- Will Shuster (1893–1969), American painter, sculptor and teacher
- Elizabeth Siddal (1829–1862), English artists' model, poet and artist
- Peter Purves Smith (1912–1949), Australian modernist artist, died during a lung operation
- Virginia Frances Sterret (1900–1931), American artist and illustrator
- Theodore Van Soelen (1890–1964), American landscape painter
- Carlos Vierra (1876–1937), American painter, illustrator and photographer

== Composers, singers and musicians ==
- Carl Michael Bellman (1740–1795), Swedish songwriter, composer, musician, poet, and entertainer
- Jimmy Blanton, jazz bassist
- Luigi Boccherini, Italian cellist and composer, died in 1805 of pulmonary tuberculosis
- Alfredo Catalani
- Frédéric Chopin (1810–1849), died of consumption at age 39 (see the discussion for details). Historical records indicate episodes of hemoptysis during performances.
- Charlie Christian, jazz guitarist; pioneer of the electric guitar
- Tom Fogerty, (1941–1990), rhythm guitarist for Creedence Clearwater Revival
- George Formby, Sr., music hall comedian and singer (d. 1921)
- Stephen Foster
- Hermann Goetz
- Louis Joseph Ferdinand Herold
- Alex Hill, jazz pianist
- Tom Jones, Welsh singing legend, spent about a year recovering from TB in his parents' basement around the age of 12
- Joseph Martin Kraus
- Jari Mäenpää, Finnish musician
- James "Bubber" Miley, jazz trumpeter
- Joseph Mohr
- Niccolò Paganini
- Jimmy Palao (1879–1925), jazz musician, died of tuberculosis at age 45
- Giovanni Battista Pergolesi (1710–1736), died of tuberculosis at age 26
- Henry Purcell
- Julius Reubke (1834–1858), German composer, pianist, and organist
- Jimmie Rodgers (1897–1933), country music singer, sang about the woes of tuberculosis in the song T.B. Blues (co-written with Raymond E. Hall) and ultimately died of the disease days after a New York City recording session.
- Johann Hermann Schein
- Igor Stravinsky
- Karol Szymanowski (1882-1937), died of TB at age 54
- Ringo Starr, musician/former drummer of The Beatles, survived having tuberculosis at age 11
- Cat Stevens (now Yusuf Islam) §, British singer-songwriter
- Carl Maria von Weber
- Chick Webb
- Link Wray

== Religious figures ==
- Dina Bélanger (1897–1929), beatified Canadian nun
- David Brainerd (1718–1747), left a diary that reflects his reliance upon God's faithfulness amidst his battle with consumption. The diary was historically very influential, particularly to the modern Christian missionary movement.
- John Calvin, leader of the Protestant Reformation
- Józef Cebula (1902–1941), beatified Polish priest
- Saint Gemma Galgani, suffered from 'tuberculosis of the spine with aggravated curvature'
- John Harvard (1607–1638), English dissenting minister and founder of Harvard University
- Saint Maria Faustina Kowalska, the Roman Catholic religious Sister and mystic from Poland, initiator of the Divine Mercy devotion, suffered greatly from tuberculosis and succumbed to it on 5 October 1938.
- Nachman of Breslov (1772–1810), Hasidic rabbi and religious teacher
- Karl Leisner (1915–1945), Roman Catholic priest
- Bruna Pellesi (1917–1972), beatified Italian nun
- Maria Angela Picco (1867–1921), beatified Italian Roman Catholic
- Gérard Raymond (1912–1932), Canadian seminarian
- Cardinal Richelieu of France, died from tuberculosis in 1642
- Junípero Serra (1713–1784), Spanish Catholic priest and missionary
- Saint Bernadette Soubirous, the visionary of Lourdes
- Muktanand Swami (1758–1830), saint of the Swaminarayan Sampraday.
- Saint Thérèse de Lisieux (1873–1897), died of tuberculosis
- Richard Wurmbrand, Protestant minister
- Domingo Iturrate Zubero (1901–1927), Spanish Roman Catholic priest

== Leaders and politicians ==
- Abdulmejid I, 31st Ottoman sultan
- Princess Amelia, at age 27; youngest child of King George III
- Simón Bolívar, the liberator of Colombia, Venezuela, Ecuador, Bolivia and Peru, died in 1830 of tuberculosis
- Henry B Bolster
- Anthony Burns (1834–1862), American enslaved man who challenged the Fugitive Slave Act
- John C. Calhoun, seventh Vice President of the United States
- John Solomon Cartwright (1804–1845), Canadian businessman, lawyer, judge, farmer, and political figure
- Catherine I of Russia (1684–1727), emperor
- Charles IX of France
- Crowfoot (1830–1890), chief of the Siksika First Nation
- Charles Daoust (1825–1868), Canadian lawyer, journalist, and political figure
- Edward VI of England (1537–1553), died of tuberculosis at age 15
- Elizabeth of Austria (1436–1505), a study of her bones indicated that she probably had tuberculosis at a young age
- Read Fletcher (c. 1829–1889), American politician, lawyer, co-founder and editor of the Pine Bluff Graphic
- Lucien Gagnon (1793–1843), farmer who fought in the Lower Canada Rebellion
- Gilbert Anselme Girouard (1846–1885), Canadian member of parliament
- John Hearn (politician) (1827–1894), Irish-Canadian member of parliament
- Henry VII of England
- Ho Chi Minh
- John Henry "Doc" Holliday, famous gambler and gunslinger, suffered from tuberculosis until his death in 1887
- Charles Hamilton Houston, NAACP lawyer known as "The Man Who Killed Jim Crow"
- Andrew Jackson, 7th President of the United States
- Muhammed Ali Jinnah
- Andres Larka (1878–1942), Estonian military commander and politician; suffered from tuberculosis after 1924
- Sir Wilfrid Laurier, Prime Minister of Canada
- Edward Baker Lincoln, son of Abraham Lincoln and Mary Todd Lincoln
- Thomas "Tad" Daniel Lincoln (1853–1871), youngest child of Abraham Lincoln and Mary Todd Lincoln, died of TB in Chicago, Illinois, at age 18
- Graciano López Jaena (1856–1896), Filipino journalist, orator, reformist, and national hero
- Louis Joseph, Dauphin of France (1781–1789), second child of Louis XVI and Marie Antoinette
- Louis, Dauphin of France (1729–1765), elder son of Louis XV
- Louis XIII of France
- Louis XVII of France
- John Lynch (c.1832–1866), Irish nationalist
- William Mactavish (1815–1870), 21st hereditary Chief of Clan MacTavish of Dunardry, Scottish-Canadian trader and governor
- J. B. McLachlan (1869–1937), Scottish-Canadian trade unionist, journalist, revolutionary, and activist
- Madeleine of Valois (Daughter of Francis I of France, first wife of James V of Scotland
- Nestor Makhno (Ukrainian revolutionary)
- Peshwa Madhavrao I
- Asif Maharramov, national hero of Azerbaijan
- Mahmud II, 30th Ottoman sultan
- Nelson Mandela, South African anti-apartheid revolutionary, politician and philanthropist. He got tuberculosis exacerbated by the dank conditions in his cell
- Albert Mountain Horse (1893–1915), Kainai Canadian soldier
- Marcelo H. del Pilar (1850–1896), Filipino writer, lawyer, journalist, and freemason
- Mary Tudor, Queen of France (Daughter of Henry VII of England, third wife of Louis XII of France)
- James Monroe
- Napoleon II, disputed Emperor of the French, later Austrian nobility
- Anne Neville (queen consort of Richard III of England) (unproven)
- Arthur Nixon, President Richard Nixon's brother
- Harold Nixon, President Nixon's brother
- William Bernard O'Donoghue (1843–1878), Irish-American participant in the Red River Rebellion
- Prince Paul von Thurn und Taxis (1843–1879), former aide-de-camp of King Ludwig II
- Pedro I of Brazil (Pedro IV of Portugal)
- Petar II Petrović Njegoš (1813-1851), was a Prince-Bishop (vladika) of Montenegro, poet and philosopher whose works are widely considered some of the most important in Serbian/Montenegrin literature.
- Jane Pierce, United States first lady
- Madame de Pompadour (1721–1764), French courtier and chief mistress of Louis XV
- Joseph Mary Plunkett
- Gavrilo Princip, assassin who fired the "first shot" of World War I
- Manuel L. Quezon, President of the Philippines
- John Aaron Rawlins
- Dmitri Pavlovitch Romanov
- Eleanor Roosevelt, United States first lady
- Haym Salomon, major financier of the American side during the American Revolutionary War
- Dred Scott (1799–1858), plaintiff in Supreme Court case Dred Scott v. Sandford
- Takasugi Shinsaku (1839–1867), samurai
- Okita Soji (1842/1844–1868), young and famous captain of the Shinsengumi, died from tuberculosis. He was rumored to have discovered his disease when he coughed blood and fainted during the Ikedaya Affair.
- Alexander Stephens, the only Vice President of the Confederate States
- Sudirman, Commander of Indonesia's armed forces during its National Revolution
- Alexis de Tocqueville (1805–1859), French political philosopher
- Shreya Tripathi (d. 2018), Indian health activist
- Charles Turner Torrey (1813–1846), American abolitionist
- Desmond Tutu, South African clergyman and reformer, had tuberculosis as a child
- Andreas Vokos Miaoulis, Greek admiral and politician
- David Walker (1796–1830), American abolitionist
- George Washington Williams (1849–1891), American minister, politician, lawyer, journalist, and writer
- Yasuhito, Prince Chichibu
- John Young

== Scientists ==
- Niels Abel, mathematician
- William James Anderson (1812–1873), Scottish-Canadian physician
- Frédéric Bastiat
- Alexander Graham Bell
- Norman Bethune (1890–1939), Canadian surgeon and Communist
- Anders Celsius
- William Kingdon Clifford, mathematician and philosopher
- Reuben Crandall, 19th-century physician, caught disease while in jail awaiting trial; he was acquitted
- George Mercer Dawson (1849–1901), Canadian geologist and surveyor
- Gotthold Eisenstein, mathematician
- Augustin-Jean Fresnel
- Richard Brinsley Hinds (1811–1846), British naval surgeon, botanist and malacologist, diagnosed with phthisis in 1845
- Anandi Gopal Joshi, first Indian woman to obtain a degree in Western medicine
- Edgar Lee Hewett (1865–1946), American archaeologist and anthropologist
- George Katona, founder of behavioural macro-economics
- Immanuel Kant
- René Laennec, French physician; inventor of the stethoscope
- Dmitri Mendeleev, creator of the first version of the periodic table of elements.
- Friedrich Miescher, Swiss biochemist, noted for discovery of nucleic acids in cell nucleus (1844–1895)
- Herman Potočnik
- Srinivasa Ramanujan, mathematician; uncertain: believed for many years to have died from tuberculosis but now suspected the cause may have been hepatic amoebiasis
- Gustav Roch, mathematician
- Bernhard Riemann, mathematician
- Erwin Schrödinger
- Flora Madeline Shaw (1864–1927), Canadian nurse and nursing teacher
- Baruch Spinoza
- Edward Livingston Trudeau, American physician who established the Adirondack Cottage Sanitorium for treatment of tuberculosis
- Adrianus Turnebus
- Félix Vicq-d'Azyr, French anatomist
- Lev Vygotsky
- Wang Jin, former President of the Hubei Archaeological Association, died of Thoracic Spinal Tuberculosis at age 93
- Eugene Wigner

== Business ==
- Michael James Heney (1864–1910), Canadian railroad contractor
- Jay Gould, American railroad magnate and financier of the Gilded Age (1880s)
- George Keats, American businessman and civic leader
- John B. Stetson, American hat maker
- William Winchester (son of Oliver Winchester, husband of Sarah Winchester)

== Athletes ==
- Malcolm Allison, footballer and manager
- Roberto Bettega, Italian footballer; was forced out of a game on 16 January 1972 to treat his tuberculosis
- Robert Boucher (1904–1931), Canadian hockey player
- James Burke
- Rico Carty, baseball player
- George Coulthard, Australian cricketer and Australian rules footballer
- Deerfoot-Bad Meat (1864–1897), Canadian runner
- Arthur Farrell (1877–1909), Canadian hockey player
- Archie Jackson, Australian cricketer
- Dan Kolov, Bulgarian wrestler
- George Lohmann, English cricketer
- Christy Mathewson (1880–1925), major league baseball pitcher; developed tuberculosis as a consequence of being accidentally gassed during a training exercise while serving in the U.S. Army Chemical Service during World War I
- Red Schoendienst, baseball player and manager
- Katherine Stinson (1891–1977), American aviator
- Georges Vezina
- Rube Waddell
- Bob Dale, English professional footballer who retired in 1958 after contracting tuberculosis.

== Fictional characters ==
- Helen Burns in Jane Eyre
- Marguerite Gautier in La Dame aux Camélias
- Nikolai Dmitrich Levin in Anna Karenina
- Mimì in La Bohème
- Arthur Morgan in Red Dead Redemption 2
- The patients of Thomas Mann's sanatorium of The Magic Mountain
- Oscar François de Jarjayes in The Rose of Versailles
- Okita Souji in Fate/type Redline
- Ruby Gillis dies from tuberculosis in Anne of the Island

== Others ==
- Beulah Annan
- Samuel Arnold
- Sarah Bernhardt
- Louis Braille
- Demasduit (1796–1820), one of the last Beothuk women in Newfoundland
- Marie Duplessis (1824–1847), French courtesan
- Cheng Man-ch'ing, tai chi master
- W. C. Fields
- Brenda Fricker
- Andrés Gómez
- Emmett Hardy
- Antonia Navarro Huezo, at age 21; first woman in Central America to graduate from university
- John Ives
- Adrian Joss
- Freddie Keppard
- Lin Huiyin (1904–1955), Chinese architect
- Dorothy McKibbin (1897–1985), Manhattan Project administrator
- Leander H. McNelly
- Ismail Mohammed
- Florence Nightingale
- Etti Plesch
- Jeannie Rousseau, allied spy during World War II
- Shanawdithit, believed to have been the last surviving member of the Beothuk people of Newfoundland, died from tuberculosis in 1829.
- Tulasa Thapa, kidnapped Nepali girl, died of tuberculosis in 1995
- Simonetta Vespucci, artists' model
