= Health of Frédéric Chopin =

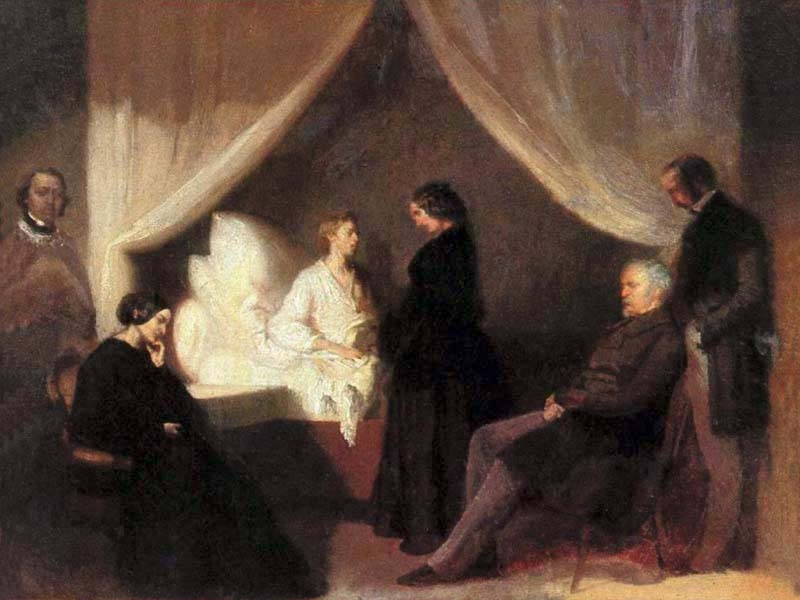
Chopin on His Deathbed, by Kwiatkowski, 1849, commissioned by Jane Stirling. Chopin sits in bed, in the presence of (from left) Aleksander Jełowicki, Chopin's sister Ludwika, Marcelina Czartoryska, Wojciech Grzymała, Kwiatkowski.

Frédéric Chopin's disease and the reason for his premature death at age 39 were frequently debated for over 150 years. Although he was diagnosed with and treated for tuberculosis throughout his lifetime, a number of alternative diagnoses have been suggested since his death in 1849. A comprehensive review of the possible causes of Chopin's illness was published in 2011. A visual examination of Chopin's heart, for which permission was finally given in 2014, indicated the likely cause of death as pericarditis, caused by tuberculosis. This has been disputed by pathologists who say that a visual examination alone cannot confirm such a disease.

== Case history ==
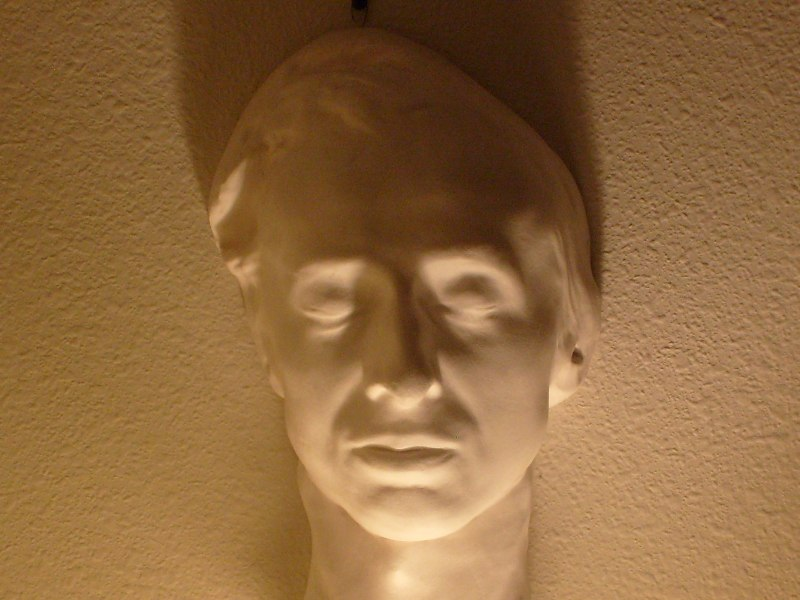
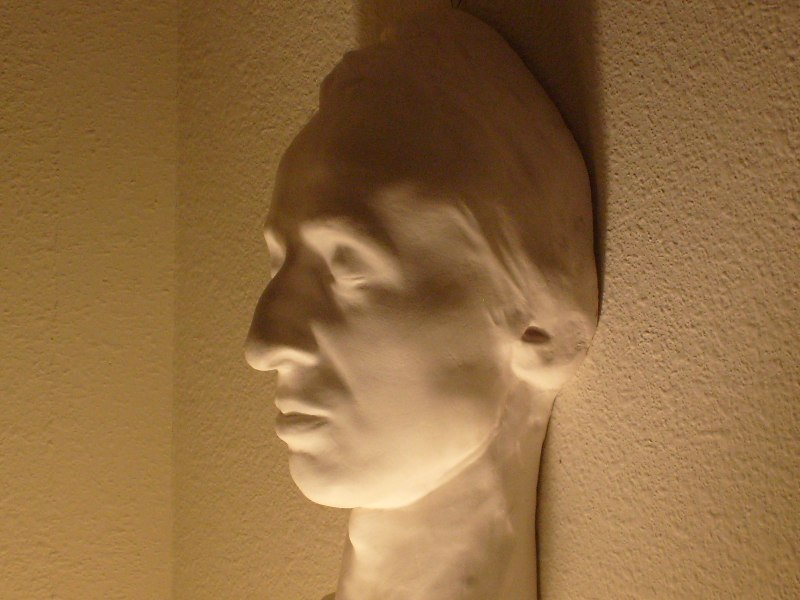
Chopin's death mask, created by Auguste Clésinger on 17 October 1849 (photographs from the collection of Jack Gibbons)

From childhood, Frédéric Chopin was sickly and under medical care. He showed intolerance to fatty foods, especially pork—these caused stomach aches, diarrhea and weight loss. Later, he endeavored to avoid such symptoms with diet; he obtained substantial improvement with ingredients such as honey and oat bran. Chopin attained a height of 170 centimetres (5 ft 7 in)—the 25th percentile; and as an adult weighed under 45 kilograms (99 lb)—below the 3rd percentile.

Chopin is known to have had no facial hair at the age of 22; as he wrote in the winter of 1832, he grew sideburns on only one side of his face. In 1826 he was sick for six months, suffering from enlarged cervical lymph nodes and severe headaches. In 1830, a chronic cold caused nasal swelling which prompted him to cancel planned concerts in Vienna.

In 1831, while in Paris, the 21-year-old Chopin had his first episode of hemoptysis (coughing up of blood). In 1835, he suffered a severe two-month bout of laryngitis and bronchitis, and the resulting interruption in his correspondence with Warsaw gave rise to gossip that he had died.

In his early youth, he treated himself with belladonna. In the final decade of his life, he treated the coughing fits from which he had suffered his entire life with a blend of sugar and opium. Chopin coughed up an abundant amount of mucus, particularly around 10 a.m. He, as some authors noted, suffered the consequences of inhaling others' smoke while enjoying the company of his Parisian friends. In the last year of his life, he endured diarrheas, caused either by cor pulmonale or by exocrine pancreatic insufficiency (see below).

On 17 October 1849, at 2 a.m., after a sudden coughing fit, Chopin died at the age of 39. His physician, Jean Cruveilhier, confirmed his death by holding a mirror to Chopin's mouth and by illuminating his pupils with light from a candle. Pursuant to Chopin's will, Dr. Cruveilhier, a renowned professor of pathology, carried out an autopsy. The postmortem findings were also communicated to Chopin's sister Ludwika, Adolphe Gutmann and Jane Stirling. The postmortem report was destroyed either in the Paris fires of 1871 or during World War II. The death certificate stated the cause of Chopin's death as tuberculosis of the lungs and larynx. However, Wojciech Grzymała, in a letter to Auguste Léo dated October 1849, wrote that the autopsy had not confirmed tubercular pulmonary changes and that his actual disease was unknown to contemporary medicine.

== Physicians ==
It is uncertain how many physicians Chopin had; various authors have given the number as 14, 31 or "nearly 50". In addition, the composer had friendly relations with other physicians, who may also have occasionally provided him with assistance.

In Warsaw, Chopin's physicians were Jan Fryderyk Wilhelm Malcz, Franciszek Girardot and Fryderyk Adolf Roemer. In Vienna, Chopin was provided medical care by Johann Malfatti. Chopin's physicians in Paris included Aleksander Hofman, Jean-Jacques Molin, André François Cauviere, Jan Matuszyński, Adam Raciborski, Pierre Gaubert, Gustave Papet and Coste, while during his 1848 stay in London they were Mallan and James Clark. In Paris, in 1848–49, he was treated by Léon Simon, Fraenkel, David Koreff, Louis and Roth. Chopin's last physician was Jean Cruveilhier.

== Family history ==
Little is known about the health of Frédéric's father, Nicolas Chopin, who lived to the age of 73. The composer's mother, Justina Chopin, reached the age of 87.

Of Frédéric's three sisters, Izabela died at age 70 and had no illnesses; Ludwika suffered from recurrent respiratory infections and died at 47; the youngest, Emilia, was of frail health from earliest childhood. Emilia suffered from recurrent coughs and dyspnea; at 11 she began having hemorrhages from the upper gastrointestinal tract, and she died of a massive hemorrhage at 14.

== Tuberculosis ==
Chopin was diagnosed with tuberculosis and treated for it in accordance with contemporary practice, including bloodletting and purging. Tuberculosis was listed on his death certificate, despite the alleged absence of typical organ changes. Critics of alternative hypotheses about Chopin's disease point out the abundant evidence for tuberculosis. Chronic coughs and hemoptysis are common symptoms of tuberculosis; complications may include both pericarditis, causing right-heart insufficiency, and bronchiectasis, manifesting in productive cough and respiratory failure.

A 20-year history of hemoptysis is rare in tuberculosis but not impossible. Similarly, cavernous tuberculosis is rare in childhood, but it cannot be excluded in the case of Emilia Chopin. Frédéric could have contracted tuberculosis from his younger sister.

A monograph on historic methods of treating tuberculosis has discussed individual treatments on the example of Chopin, since his history well illustrates views on treating tuberculosis in the mid-19th century.

== Autopsy and results ==
Attempts were made to gain permission to extract a small amount of tissue from Chopin's heart in order to test it for a range of specific conditions. Dr. Michael Witt of Warsaw's Institute of Molecular and Cell Biology made such a request in 2008, but permission was denied by the Polish government. In April 2014, a visual inspection was at last performed on Chopin's alcohol-preserved heart, under the direction of Professor Witt of the Polish Academy of Sciences. The heart remained in alcohol, and the container was not opened, so it could not be touched or sampled. Closer inspection suggested that a rare case of pericarditis, caused by complications from chronic tuberculosis, was the likely cause of Chopin's death.

== Other hypotheses ==
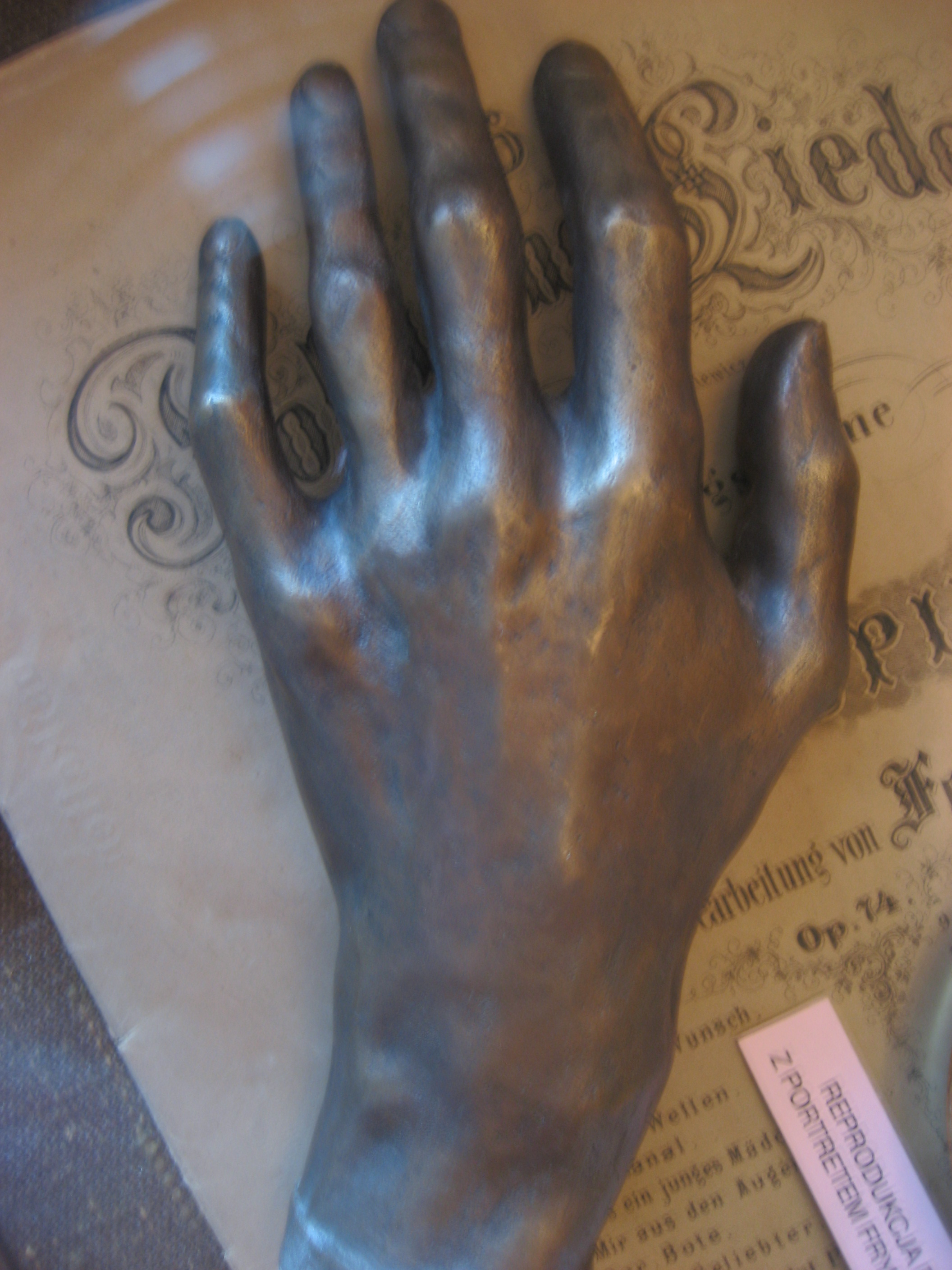
Cast of Chopin's left hand

A number of alternative hypotheses about the cause of Chopin's death flourished over the years.

The hypothesis that Chopin suffered from cystic fibrosis was first presented by O’Shea in 1987. Evidence for this diagnosis is that Chopin suffered concurrently from both respiratory illnesses and gastrointestinal dysfunction. Chopin possibly was sexually active from early adulthood, but left no descendants. Some authors consider this evidence for infertility, which favours the cystic fibrosis hypothesis. A hypothesis of alpha 1-antitrypsin deficiency was proposed by Kuzemko in 1994.

Mitral stenosis was a possible, if unlikely, cause for the artist's complaints and was discussed by Kubba and Young in 1998. The most important argument against this hypothesis is the absence of evidence that Chopin suffered from rheumatic fever in childhood, which is the most common cause of mitral valve stenosis.

Kubba and Young pointed out a number of other conceivable, if unlikely, diagnoses, besides cystic fibrosis and alpha 1-antitrypsin deficiency: eosinophilic granulomatosis with polyangiitis, allergic bronchopulmonary aspergillosis, hypogammaglobulinemia, idiopathic pulmonary haemosiderosis, lung abscesses, and pulmonary arteriovenous malformations.

== Mental health ==
Chopin's biographers have often touched on the subject of depression, but the topic has rarely been broached by psychiatrists. One of the few studies of Chopin's mental condition is a 1920 work by Bronislaw Onuf-Onufrowicz. The author cited biographers concerning Chopin's character and psyche and pointed out some symptoms that might indicate a manic-depressive disorder or dementia praecox (now termed schizophrenia), but he emphasized the absence of evidence for severe psychosis and the fact that single symptoms may suggest only a predisposition to such mental illnesses.
