= Johnstone Castle =

Coordinates: 55°49′41″N 4°30′28″W

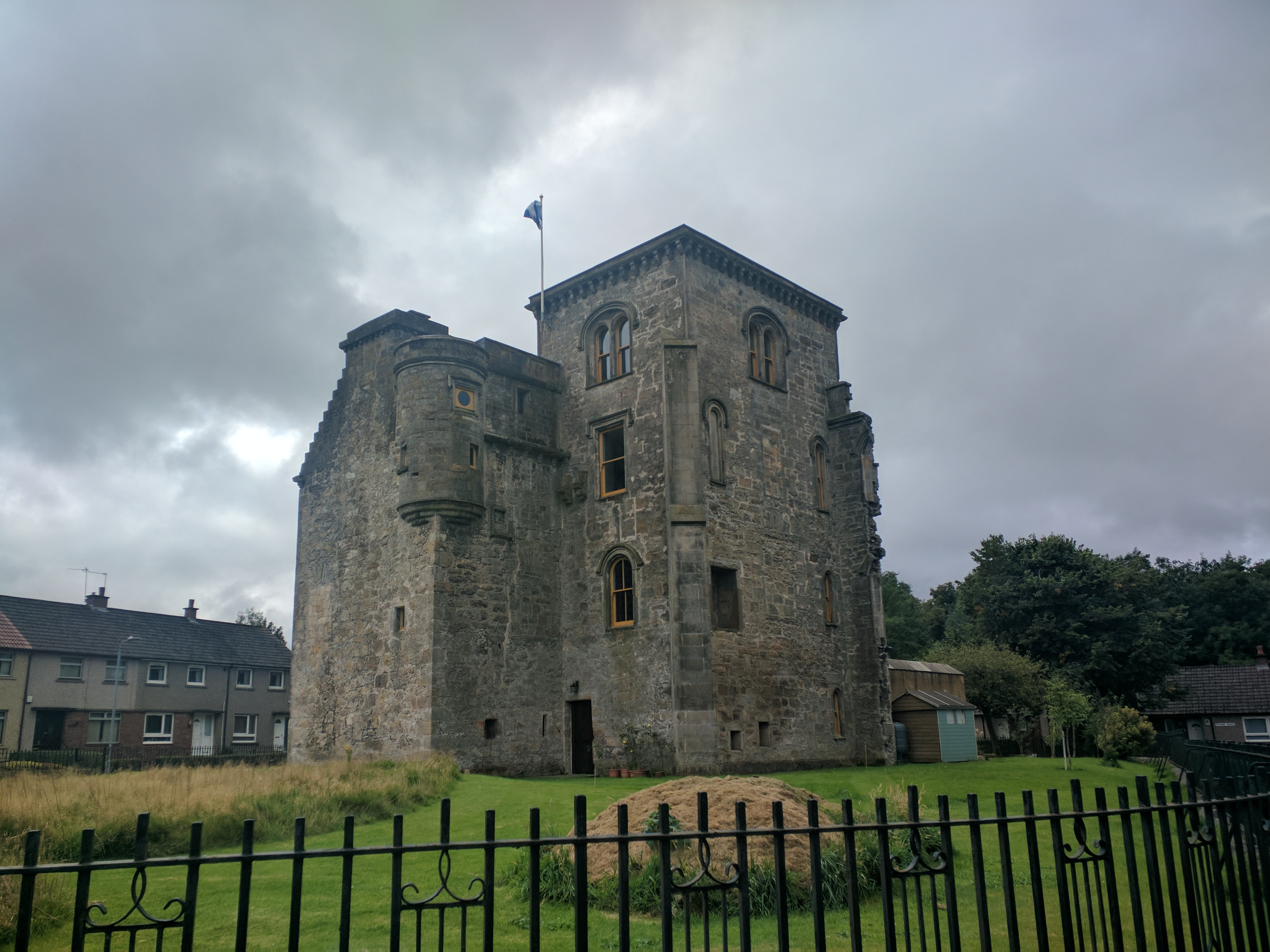
- Johnstone Castle in 2019
- Location: Johnstone, Renfrewshire, Scotland
- Built: 1560

Listed Building – Category B

Johnstone Castle (Scots: Johnstoun Castle, Scottish Gaelic: Caisteal Baile Iain) is a structure and former mansion in the town of Johnstone in Renfrewshire, Scotland.

It belonged to the Houstons of Milliken, who acquired the estate of Easter Cochrane in 1773. The original structure was substantially enlarged in 1771 and 1812 by George Houston, who had the structure remodelled in a castellated style complete with a turret at the left hand of the front elevation, possibly by the architect James Gillespie Graham.

The most notable features were barrel vaulted rooms in the ground floor. Externally in addition to the battlemented decoration there was a rope-styled string course. Although the castle and policies were considered particularly picturesque, the continued growth of the town of Johnstone reduced its size and the estate had largely disappeared by the start of the 20th century. Much of the house was demolished in 1950, and most of the remainder of the grounds was purchased by the local authority for housing in 1956.

Today all that remains is the central square tower along with a crow-stepped bartizaned section of an older date. The tower lay in disrepair until being purchased in 2001, and is now a private residence. It is a protected category B listed building.

== Frédéric Chopin ==
Johnstone Castle's principal claim to fame is a visit by the Polish composer Chopin in 1848. He had been invited by Anne Houston, wife of the then-5th laird of Johnstone Ludovick (1780-1862), as part of his Scottish tour. Anne's sister Jane Wilhelmina Stirling was a student and long-time friend of the composer, and had arranged the tour. Chopin was initially charmed by the estate and grounds, describing his stay in a letter: "I am staying at Mrs Houston's house. The Castle is very handsome, opulent, one leads life on a grand scale." Unfortunately the weather deteriorated, and he wrote to his friend Wojciech Grzymała:

The weather has changed, and it is dreadful outside. I am feeling sick and depressed, and everyone wears me down with their excessive attentions.

To compound his misery, he had a brush with a death more violent than a wasting. As the composer rode in a two-horse carriage, one of the animals reared and broke loose from the reins. Chopin was still inside when the carriage hit a tree and smashed into pieces. He managed to climb free of the wreckage.
