= Thomas Tellefsen =

Norwegian pianist and composer

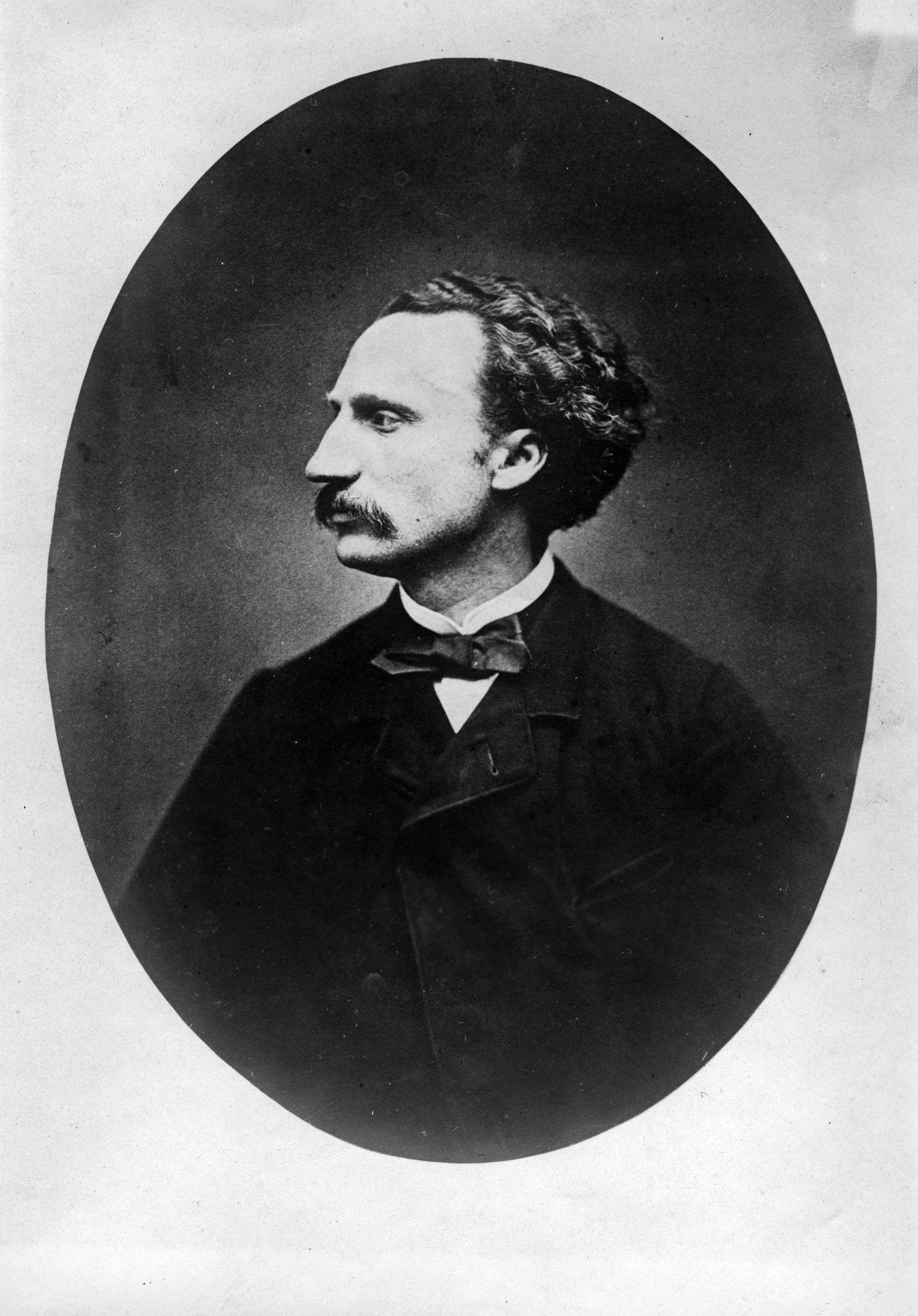
Tellefsen c. 1860

Thomas Dyke Acland Tellefsen (26 November 1823 – 6 October 1874) was a Norwegian pianist, composer, and teacher. As a composer, Tellefsen wrote 44 opuses, including solo piano works, two piano concertos, and chamber music. He dedicated many of his compositions to the Polish, Russian, and French aristocracy.

== Life ==
Tellefsen, the youngest of six siblings, was born in Trondheim, Norway, where he studied with his father Johan Christian Tellefsen (1774–1857)—the organist at Trondheim Cathedral—and with Ole Andreas Lindeman. Thomas gave his first public concert in his home town in the spring of 1842, age 18. Until he was 19, he had studied to be a priest; instead, he turned to music, and moved to Paris to seek tutelage under Frédéric Chopin. Here, he became the pupil of his compatriot Charlotte Thygeson (1811–1872; a daughter of Nicolai Emanuel de Thygeson), and later attended—free of charge—the lessons of her teacher and friend Friedrich Kalkbrenner.

Tellefsen's "highest wish"—to study under Chopin—was hugely difficult. Tellefsen stated that it was "more difficult to reach Chopin than Louis-Philippe". It was not until November 1844—through the influence of George Sand—that Tellefsen finally attained this wish. Tellefsen's letters indicate Chopin's interest in him, spending as much as three hours at a single lesson, even though they were supposed to last only an hour. During the years 1844 to 1848, he was taught periodically by Chopin, who also became his personal friend (up until his death) and had considerable influence on his musical taste, style of playing, and compositions. In 1847, Tellefsen also studied composition with Henri Reber. The French Revolution of 1848 caused Tellefsen to relocate to London. In the same year, Tellefsen accompanied Chopin—alongside Jane Stirling—on a tour through England and Scotland.

Shortly before his death, Chopin told his elder sister Ludwika that he wished to entrust the completion of his "Pianoforte Method" to Tellefsen, also wishing for Tellefsen to be musical tutor to his niece. Tellefsen referenced this method in a letter to his mother dated 28 December 1849, in which he states, "I am working hard on all this now". Whether or not he actually completed this work is not known; no record of his efforts have been discovered so far. After Chopin died in 1849, some of his pupils—including Stirling—resumed their studies under Tellefsen. He also taught Erika Nissen, née Lie. According to Tellefsen, Ludwika gave him the only complete manuscript of Chopin's compositions remaining after his death, which Tellefsen later used for his edition of Chopin's works. This edition, titled Collection des oeuvres pour le piano par Frédéric Chopin en douze livraisons (published in 1860 by Richault in Paris), was criticized by fellow Chopin pupil and editor Karol Mikuli, who noted its errors and omissions.

Princess Marcelina Czartoryska took him to the Hôtel Lambert in Paris, where he made his debut as a pianist with great success on 29 April 1851. His program included compositions by Chopin and himself. Soon after that, Tellefsen became regarded as one of the most outstanding pianists of his time, and was especially admired as an interpreter of Chopin's music and as a composer in his own right. In the 1850s and 1860s, Tellefsen was regarded as a very successful pianist, and he toured several times in England, Sweden, and in Norway. Around 1861, ill health caused him to focus more on teaching and on composing. In 1870, the Franco-Prussian War caused Tellefsen to move to London.

Tellefsen died in Paris. He is buried at the Cimetière d'Auteuil. He was a Knight of the "Seraphine" Order of Norway.

== Name ==
Tellefsen was named after his godfather, Sir Thomas Dyke Acland, 10th Baronet, as chosen by his father Johan. Sir Thomas sent to the Tellefsens his portrait as a gift, which arrived just before the baptism of their newborn son; thus, they named him Thomas Dyke Acland Tellefsen. However, Thomas opted first to sign his name only as "Thomas Tellefsen".

In a letter to his father dated 8 June 1848, Tellefsen described—during his stay in London—his meeting with Sir Thomas:

One evening, I was at a soirée at the home of Sir Robert Inglis. . . . [he] introduced me to many people, and finally said: and now I will introduce you to a gentleman who travelled around Norway and who will be most pleased to speak to you; imagine my astonishment when I saw a lively, handsome old man whose name was Thomas Acland . . . , in one instant, we became friends; I told him at once the story of my name. And then he presented me to the whole company as Thomas Acland Tellefsen! What a beautiful moment for me.

It was only after this event that Tellefsen began writing his name in full; as "T. D. A. Tellefsen".

== Compositions ==
Among his published works, Tellefsen wrote 16 mazurkas, five chamber music works (two sonatas for violin and piano; a sonata for cello and piano; a sonata for two pianos; and a trio for piano, violin, and cello), composed between 1854 and 1867. He also wrote two piano concertos (the first in 1848 and the second in 1853), six waltzes, four nocturnes, three études, and a number of larger works and salon pieces, which were written for the teaching of his pupils. Though Tellefsen's studies with Chopin show in his compositions, Chopin said of them, "there are the seeds of originality in you". Tellefsen used traditional Norwegian songs in many of his works (e.g., in his first piano concerto and in his mazurkas); in this aspect, he can be considered a forerunner of his compatriots Grieg, Svendsen, and Sinding.

In January 2024 a recording of the two piano concertos by pianist and conductor Howard Shelley was issued on the Hyperion label.

=== Works with opus number ===
Title	Opus	Section/movement	Tempo marking	Key	Genre	Year	Notes
4 Mazurkas	1	No. 1	Allegro	A major	Piano solo	1846 or before	(Note: Dedicated to Sophie Laporte, Tellefsen's student, and later, his good friend. There was even talk of marriage between them, but after a break in 1850, they went their separate ways.)
4 Mazurkas	1	No. 2	Allegro	A minor	Piano solo	1846 or before	(Note: Dedicated to Sophie Laporte, Tellefsen's student, and later, his good friend. There was even talk of marriage between them, but after a break in 1850, they went their separate ways.)
4 Mazurkas	1	No. 3	Moderato	E minor	Piano solo	1846 or before	(Note: Dedicated to Sophie Laporte, Tellefsen's student, and later, his good friend. There was even talk of marriage between them, but after a break in 1850, they went their separate ways.)
4 Mazurkas	1	No. 4	Moderato	A major	Piano solo	1846 or before	(Note: Dedicated to Sophie Laporte, Tellefsen's student, and later, his good friend. There was even talk of marriage between them, but after a break in 1850, they went their separate ways.)
Nocturne No. 1	2	—	Andante cantabile	F major	Piano solo	1849	(Note: Dedicated to Jane Stirling.)
4 Mazurkas	3	No. 1	Moderato	G minor	Piano solo	1849	(Note: Dedicated to Marcelina Czartoryska.)
4 Mazurkas	3	No. 2	Vivace	G major	Piano solo	1849	(Note: Dedicated to Marcelina Czartoryska.)
4 Mazurkas	3	No. 3	Allegro vivace	B♭ major	Piano solo	1849	(Note: Dedicated to Marcelina Czartoryska.)
4 Mazurkas	3	No. 4	Mesto	F♯ minor	Piano solo	1849	(Note: Dedicated to Marcelina Czartoryska.)
Ave Maria	4	—	Pas trop lent	G major	Vocal music	1850 c.	(Note: Dedicated to Christence Sophie Thiis on the day of her First Communion. Written for soprano with piano accompaniment. Tellefsen was good friends with Christence's father, Johan Fredrik Monrad Thiis (1805–1887).)
3 Valses brillantes	5	No. 1	—	A♭ major	Piano solo	1851	(Note: No. 1 was dedicated to Z. Auber, No. 2 to Ludwika Jędrzejewicz, and No. 3 to Charlotte Jane Stirling of Glenbervie (27 September 1838 – 1866), a niece of Jean "Jane" Wilhemina Stirling.)
3 Valses brillantes	5	No. 2	Vivace	G major	Piano solo	1851	(Note: No. 1 was dedicated to Z. Auber, No. 2 to Ludwika Jędrzejewicz, and No. 3 to Charlotte Jane Stirling of Glenbervie (27 September 1838 – 1866), a niece of Jean "Jane" Wilhemina Stirling.)
3 Valses brillantes	5	No. 3	Allegro moderato	E major	Piano solo	1851	(Note: No. 1 was dedicated to Z. Auber, No. 2 to Ludwika Jędrzejewicz, and No. 3 to Charlotte Jane Stirling of Glenbervie (27 September 1838 – 1866), a niece of Jean "Jane" Wilhemina Stirling.)
Tarentelle	6	—	Molto vivace	E♭ major	Piano solo	1853	(Note: Dedicated to Baron Nathaniel von Stockhausen, the Hanoverian ambassador to France, to whom Chopin also dedicated his Ballade No. 1.)
Élégie	7	—	Molto adagio	F minor	Piano solo	1853	(Note: Dedicated to the memory of François Gustave Oscar (son of Oscar I), hereditarian prince of Sweden and Norway. The piece ends with the hymn "Wer weiß, wie nahe mir mein Ende", which is sung to the melody of "Wer nur den lieben Gott läßt walten" by Georg Neumark.)
Piano Concerto No. 1	8	First movement	Allegro moderato	G minor	Piano and orchestra	1847–48	(Note: Dedicated to Oscar I. The concerto has a traditional bridal march from Sogn used as the main theme and a rhythmic theme as a second theme taken from the Halling dance.)
Piano Concerto No. 1	8	Second movement	Andante	E♭ major	Piano and orchestra	1847–48	(Note: Dedicated to Oscar I. The concerto has a traditional bridal march from Sogn used as the main theme and a rhythmic theme as a second theme taken from the Halling dance.)
Piano Concerto No. 1	8	Third movement	Finale. Allegro	G minor	Piano and orchestra	1847–48	(Note: Dedicated to Oscar I. The concerto has a traditional bridal march from Sogn used as the main theme and a rhythmic theme as a second theme taken from the Halling dance.)
Huldredansen	9	—	Allegro moderato	G minor	Piano solo	1853	(Note: Dedicated to Countess Delfina Potocka, née Komar. The title can be translated as "Dance of the Hulders"; it may have been written for the annual carnival celebration for Norwegian artists in Paris.)
Adagio et Rondo	10	—	Adagio; allegro moderato	B minor	Piano solo	1853	(Note: Dedicated to Charlotte de Rothschild. The title is also known as Adagio, Cantabile et Rondo.)
Nocturne No. 2	11	—	Andante cantabile	E major	Piano solo	1853	(Note: Dedicated to Lady Mary Murray, née Rigby (1778–1861); wife of Sir John Archibald Murray.)
Thème Original et Fantaisie	12	Thème	Andante	B♭ minor	Piano solo	1855 c.	(Note: Dedicated to Tellefsen's friend and fellow Chopin pupil, Paul Gunsberg (died 1845). This composition has an introduction marked Largo.)
Thème Original et Fantaisie	12	Fantaisie	Adagio	D♭ major	Piano solo	1855 c.	(Note: Dedicated to Tellefsen's friend and fellow Chopin pupil, Paul Gunsberg (died 1845). This composition has an introduction marked Largo.)
Piano Sonata	13	First movement	Allegro moderato	C minor	Piano solo	1848 c.	(Note: Dedicated to Countess Genovefa Paulina Emilia Puslowska, née Drucka-Lubecka (1821–1869); a daughter of Franciszek Ksawery Drucki-Lubecki.)
Piano Sonata	13	Second movement	Adagio	A♭ major	Piano solo	1848 c.	(Note: Dedicated to Countess Genovefa Paulina Emilia Puslowska, née Drucka-Lubecka (1821–1869); a daughter of Franciszek Ksawery Drucki-Lubecki.)
Piano Sonata	13	Third movement	Rondo. Vivace	C major	Piano solo	1848 c.	(Note: Dedicated to Countess Genovefa Paulina Emilia Puslowska, née Drucka-Lubecka (1821–1869); a daughter of Franciszek Ksawery Drucki-Lubecki.)
6 Mazurkas	14	No. 1	Allegro	D minor	Piano solo	1853/54	(Note: Nos. 1 and 2 were dedicated to Princess Anna Andreyevna Trubetskaya, née Countess Gudovich; wife of Prince Nikolai Ivanovich Trubetzkoy and a granddaughter of Ivan Gudovich. Nos. 3 and 4 were dedicated to Countess Anna Nina Branicka, née Hołyńska h. Klamry (1824–1907); daughter of Michał Hołyński and wife of Aleksander Branicki. Nos. 5 and 6 were dedicated to Countess A. Mniszech (possibly Anna Maria Barbara Ludwika hr. Wandalin-Mniszech h. Kończyc (1827–1885), wife of Count Andrzej Jerzy Mniszech). No. 2 is entitled La Ronde.)
6 Mazurkas	14	No. 2	Leggiero	G major	Piano solo	1853/54	
6 Mazurkas	14	No. 3	Leggiero	F minor	Piano solo	1853/54	
6 Mazurkas	14	No. 4	Moderato	F major	Piano solo	1853/54	
6 Mazurkas	14	No. 5	Allegro vivace	D major	Piano solo	1853/54	
6 Mazurkas	14	No. 6	Lento simplice	C minor	Piano solo	1853/54	
Piano Concerto No. 2	15	First movement	Allegro moderato	F minor	Piano and orchestra	1853	
Piano Concerto No. 2	15	Second movement	Adagio	E major	Piano and orchestra	1853	
Piano Concerto No. 2	15	Third movement	Finale. Mouvement de Tarentelle	F minor	Piano and orchestra	1853	
3 Feuillets d'album	16	No. 1	Allegro moderato	B♭ major	Piano solo	1855	(Note: Dedicated to Princess Elisabeth Czartoryska (possibly Izabella Elżbieta Czartoryska).)
3 Feuillets d'album	16	No. 2	Lento	A♭ major	Piano solo	1855	(Note: Dedicated to Princess Elisabeth Czartoryska (possibly Izabella Elżbieta Czartoryska).)
3 Feuillets d'album	16	No. 3	Marche funèbre. Legato	C minor	Piano solo	1855	(Note: Dedicated to Princess Elisabeth Czartoryska (possibly Izabella Elżbieta Czartoryska).)
Nocturne No. 3	17	—	Adagio ma non troppo	G minor	Piano solo	1855	(Note: Dedicated to Countess Eleonora Laura Świeykowska h. Trzaska, née Lachman (1827–1892).)
Grande Polonaise	18	—	Moderato	C♯ minor	Piano solo	1855–56 c.	(Note: Dedicated to Her Royal Highness Wilhelmina Frederica Alexandra Anna Lowisa, royal princess of Sweden and Norway.)
Violin Sonata No. 1	19	First movement	Allegro moderato	G major	Chamber music	1855–56	(Note: Dedicated to His Majesty Guillaume III, Roi des Pays-Bas. Written for violin and piano.)
Violin Sonata No. 1	19	Second movement	Adagio	E♭ major	Chamber music	1855–56	(Note: Dedicated to His Majesty Guillaume III, Roi des Pays-Bas. Written for violin and piano.)
Violin Sonata No. 1	19	Third movement	Scherzo. Presto	G minor	Chamber music	1855–56	(Note: Dedicated to His Majesty Guillaume III, Roi des Pays-Bas. Written for violin and piano.)
Violin Sonata No. 1	19	Fourth movement	Finale. Allegro vivace	G major	Chamber music	1855–56	(Note: Dedicated to His Majesty Guillaume III, Roi des Pays-Bas. Written for violin and piano.)
Allegretto	20	—	Simplice	A major	Piano solo	1856	(Note: Dedicated to Madame Sherman.)
Cello Sonata	21	First movement	Allegro	E♭ major	Chamber music	1857	(Note: Dedicated to Her Catholic Majesty Isabella II, Reine d'Espagne. Written for cello and piano.)
Cello Sonata	21	Second movement	Allegretto	G minor	Chamber music	1857	(Note: Dedicated to Her Catholic Majesty Isabella II, Reine d'Espagne. Written for cello and piano.)
Cello Sonata	21	Third movement	Finale. Allegro	E♭ major	Chamber music	1857	(Note: Dedicated to Her Catholic Majesty Isabella II, Reine d'Espagne. Written for cello and piano.)
Toccata	22	—	Allegro	F major	Piano solo	1857	(Note: Dedicated to Countess Anna Nina Branicka, née Hołyńska h. Klamry.)
La petite mendiante	23	—	Allegro ma non tropo	E minor	Piano solo	1858	(Note: Dedicated to Princess Maria Vasilyevna Vorontsova, née Princess Trubetskaya (1819–1895); a daughter of Prince Vasily Sergeyevich Trubetskoy and second wife of Prince Semyon Mikhailovich Vorontsov. The title can be translated as "The Little Beggar Girl".)
Grande Mazurka	24	—	—	B♭ major	Piano solo	1858	(Note: Dedicated to Baroness Leonora de Rothschild (1837–1911), wife of Alphonse de Rothschild.)
Grande Étude	25	—	Allegro	C♯ minor	Piano solo	1858	(Note: Dedicated to Madame Barbe de Stolypine (possibly Varvara Alekseyevna Stolypina, née Bakhmetyeva (1816–1896); a daughter of Alexey Nikolaevich Bakhmetev).)
Bruraslaatten	26	—	Maestoso	D major	Piano solo	1858	(Note: Dedicated to Princess Julie Galitzin (probably Princess Julia Górska, née Golitsyn (1840–1914); sister of Grigory Golitsyn). The title can be translated as "Bridal Tune"; its subtitle is Danse Norvégienne (Norwegian Dance [No. 2]). It may have been written for the annual carnival celebration for Norwegian artists in Paris.)
Valse	27	—	Moderato	D♭ major	Piano solo	1863 c.	(Note: Dedicated to Charlotte de Rothschild.)
Ballade	28	—	Allegretto	C minor	Piano solo	1860	(Note: Dedicated to Gioachino Rossini.)
Marche triomphale	29	—	Allegro moderato. Maestoso	E♭ major	Piano solo	1861	(Note: Dedicated to Baroness Marguerite de Contades, née Countess de Broc.)
2 Grandes Valses (Nos. 5 & 6)	30	No. 1	Moderato	F major	Piano solo	1861	(Note: No. 1 was dedicated to Madame Marquess de Béthisy (possibly a daughter of Alfred-Charles-Gaston de Béthisy), and No. 2 to Cécile Anspach (wife of Gustave de Rothschild).)
2 Grandes Valses (Nos. 5 & 6)	30	No. 2	Moderato	F minor	Piano solo	1861	(Note: No. 1 was dedicated to Madame Marquess de Béthisy (possibly a daughter of Alfred-Charles-Gaston de Béthisy), and No. 2 to Cécile Anspach (wife of Gustave de Rothschild).)
Piano Trio	31	First movement	Allegro maestoso	B♭ major	Chamber music	1861	(Note: Written for violin, cello, and piano.)
Piano Trio	31	Second movement	Scherzo. Moderato	D minor/D major	Chamber music	1861	(Note: Written for violin, cello, and piano.)
Piano Trio	31	Third movement	Adagio	E♭ major	Chamber music	1861	(Note: Written for violin, cello, and piano.)
Piano Trio	31	Fourth movement	Finale. Allegro	B♭ major	Chamber music	1861	(Note: Written for violin, cello, and piano.)
—	32	No. 1	Berceuse. Andante	G major	Piano solo	1862	(Note: No. 1 was dedicated to Countess Eleonora Laura Świeykowska h. Trzaska, née Lachman; No. 2 to Lady Ashburton, née Stuart Mackenzie; and No. 3 to Madame Amélie Lecarpentier, née Brunet. This composition, divided into three sections/movements, has no title. Some sources list it as Berceuse, while others just as Op. 32. All written for violin (alternatively, for cello) and piano.)
—	32	No. 2	Joyeux Refrain. Allegro	D major	Piano solo	1863	(Note: No. 1 was dedicated to Countess Eleonora Laura Świeykowska h. Trzaska, née Lachman; No. 2 to Lady Ashburton, née Stuart Mackenzie; and No. 3 to Madame Amélie Lecarpentier, née Brunet. This composition, divided into three sections/movements, has no title. Some sources list it as Berceuse, while others just as Op. 32. All written for violin (alternatively, for cello) and piano.)
—	32	No. 3	Dans la Vallée, Idylle. Andante ma non troppo	A major	Piano solo	1863 c.	(Note: No. 1 was dedicated to Countess Eleonora Laura Świeykowska h. Trzaska, née Lachman; No. 2 to Lady Ashburton, née Stuart Mackenzie; and No. 3 to Madame Amélie Lecarpentier, née Brunet. This composition, divided into three sections/movements, has no title. Some sources list it as Berceuse, while others just as Op. 32. All written for violin (alternatively, for cello) and piano.)
Mazurka (Polskdans)	33	—	—	A major	Piano solo	1863	(Note: Dedicated to Jenny Lind Goldschmidt. The subtitle can be translated as "Polish Dance".)
Au travers d'un songe	34	—	Andante	A♭ major	Piano solo	1868	(Note: Dedicated to Countess Genovefa Paulina Emilia Puslowska, née Drucka-Lubecka. The title can be translated as "Through a Dream".)
Air de ballet	35	—	Allegretto	D minor	Chamber music	1865 c.	(Note: Dedicated to Tellefsen's friend Stefan August Świeykowski h. Trzaska (1848–1876), son of Eleonora Laura.)
Capriccio appasionato	36	—	Allegro non troppo	B minor	Piano solo	1868	(Note: Dedicated to Mlle C. Vannier.)
Violin Sonata No. 2	37	First movement	Largo — Allegro — Presto	E minor	Chamber music	1867 c.	(Note: Dedicated to Oscar II of Sweden and Norway. Written for violin (alternatively, for cello) and piano.)
Violin Sonata No. 2	37	Second movement	Interlude (complainte). Andante	E major	Chamber music	1867 c.	(Note: Dedicated to Oscar II of Sweden and Norway. Written for violin (alternatively, for cello) and piano.)
Violin Sonata No. 2	37	Third movement	Thème varié. Andante	E major	Chamber music	1867 c.	(Note: Dedicated to Oscar II of Sweden and Norway. Written for violin (alternatively, for cello) and piano.)
Impromptu	38	—	Allegro	G minor	Piano solo	1872	(Note: Dedicated to Tellefsen's friend Count Zygmunt Władysław Mikołaj Pusłowski (1848–1913), a son of Genovefa and father of Xawery Pusłowski.)
Nocturne No. 4	39	—	Andante	G♭ major	Piano solo	1872	(Note: Dedicated to Tellefsen's friend Count Francis Xaverius Pusłowski (1843–1908), a brother of Zygmunt.)
Walhallafesten	40	—	Moderato	G minor/G major	Piano solo	1870 c.	(Note: Dedicated to Victoire Fernández de Velasco (née Balfe), duchess of Frías. The piece is subtitled Fête à Valhalla, Danse Norvégienne No. 3, which can be translated as "Party in Valhalla, Norwegian Dance No. 3". It may have been written for the annual carnival celebration for Norwegian artists in Paris in 1869.)
Sonate pour deux pianos	41	First movement	Allegro maestoso	B minor	Piano duo	1870 c.	(Note: Dedicated to Pedro II of Brazil.)
Sonate pour deux pianos	41	Second movement	Andante	D major	Piano duo	1870 c.	(Note: Dedicated to Pedro II of Brazil.)
Sonate pour deux pianos	41	Third movement	Finale. Moderato	B major	Piano duo	1870 c.	(Note: Dedicated to Pedro II of Brazil.)
Melodies écossaises	42	First section	Andante con moto	F♯ minor/F♯ major	Piano solo	1868 c.	(Note: Dedicated to Madame Hutchinson. After Tellefsen fled from Paris to London following the Franco-Prussian War, he apparently rented an apartment for teaching in Hutchinson's boarding house.)
Melodies écossaises	42	Second section	= 60	D major/D minor/B♭ major	Piano solo	1868 c.	(Note: Dedicated to Madame Hutchinson. After Tellefsen fled from Paris to London following the Franco-Prussian War, he apparently rented an apartment for teaching in Hutchinson's boarding house.)
Melodies écossaises	42	Third section	= 144	A major	Piano solo	1868 c.	(Note: Dedicated to Madame Hutchinson. After Tellefsen fled from Paris to London following the Franco-Prussian War, he apparently rented an apartment for teaching in Hutchinson's boarding house.)
Étude	43	—	Allegro	E major	Piano solo	1867 c.	(Note: Dedicated to Madame Delaborde (possibly Sophie-Victoire Delaborde, George Sand's mother). This étude is one of the pieces that Isidor Philipp incorporated into his set of 12 Etudes de virtuosité, which also includes pieces composed by Alkan, Méreaux, Kessler, Willmers, Mayer, and Liszt.)
Pavane de la Reine Elisabeth	44	—	Andante noblement	C♯ minor/D♭ major	Piano solo	1870 c.	(Note: Dedicated to Betty von Rothschild.)

=== Works without opus number ===
Tellefsen's works without opus numbers are either piano studies or liturgical pieces. His Moderato, written in 1842, is one of his very first attempts in composition. Another collection of works consists of 21 short fughettas, versetti, and cantabile pieces, suitable in length in Roman Catholic and Lutheran services during the time in which they were written. The versetti are organ verses played in alternation with sung verses of hymns. The preludes were played for organ or pedal piano. They were used as preludes and postludes, while a cantabile piece might also appear after the sermon as an introduction to the next hymn. Variations on hymn tunes are a much-used form in church services as well.

Title	Catalogue number	Tempo marking	Key	Genre	Year	Notes
Valse	—	—	A major	Piano solo	—	—
Moderato	—	—	—	Piano solo	1842	—
Choral variations on the hymn "Kimer, I klokker"	—	—	G major	Piano solo	—	(Note: Kimer, I klokker was a Christmas hymn written by Henrik Rung and N. F. S. Grundtvig in 1856 at the invitation of the vicar of Mern, Peter Rørdam.)
Prelude	—	Allegro moderato	G major	Piano solo	—	—
Lento - Allegro moderato - Tempo primo	—	—	—	Piano solo	—	—
Larghetto	—	—	—	Piano solo	—	—
Prelude	—	—	G major	Piano solo	—	—
Suite: Prelude, Versette, Prelude 2, Prelude da capo	—	—	G minor	Piano solo	—	—
Fughetta'r, Versettes & Cantabilla	Fughetta I	—	C major	Piano solo	—	(Note: Fughettas Nos. II, VI, VII, and XIV for 4 voices; Nos. III–V, VIII–XIII, and XV for 3 voices. Fughetta XII written in the Dorian mode. Interlude, Mellonspill in Norwegian and Zwischenspiel in German, written in the Dorian mode as well.)
Fughetta'r, Versettes & Cantabilla	Fughetta II	—	C major	Piano solo	—	(Note: Fughettas Nos. II, VI, VII, and XIV for 4 voices; Nos. III–V, VIII–XIII, and XV for 3 voices. Fughetta XII written in the Dorian mode. Interlude, Mellonspill in Norwegian and Zwischenspiel in German, written in the Dorian mode as well.)
Fughetta'r, Versettes & Cantabilla	Fughetta III	—	C major	Piano solo	—	(Note: Fughettas Nos. II, VI, VII, and XIV for 4 voices; Nos. III–V, VIII–XIII, and XV for 3 voices. Fughetta XII written in the Dorian mode. Interlude, Mellonspill in Norwegian and Zwischenspiel in German, written in the Dorian mode as well.)
Fughetta'r, Versettes & Cantabilla	Fughetta IV	—	A minor	Piano solo	—	(Note: Fughettas Nos. II, VI, VII, and XIV for 4 voices; Nos. III–V, VIII–XIII, and XV for 3 voices. Fughetta XII written in the Dorian mode. Interlude, Mellonspill in Norwegian and Zwischenspiel in German, written in the Dorian mode as well.)
Fughetta'r, Versettes & Cantabilla	Fughetta V	—	A minor	Piano solo	—	(Note: Fughettas Nos. II, VI, VII, and XIV for 4 voices; Nos. III–V, VIII–XIII, and XV for 3 voices. Fughetta XII written in the Dorian mode. Interlude, Mellonspill in Norwegian and Zwischenspiel in German, written in the Dorian mode as well.)
Fughetta'r, Versettes & Cantabilla	Fughetta VI	—	A minor	Piano solo	—	(Note: Fughettas Nos. II, VI, VII, and XIV for 4 voices; Nos. III–V, VIII–XIII, and XV for 3 voices. Fughetta XII written in the Dorian mode. Interlude, Mellonspill in Norwegian and Zwischenspiel in German, written in the Dorian mode as well.)
Fughetta'r, Versettes & Cantabilla	Fughetta VII	—	A minor	Piano solo	—	(Note: Fughettas Nos. II, VI, VII, and XIV for 4 voices; Nos. III–V, VIII–XIII, and XV for 3 voices. Fughetta XII written in the Dorian mode. Interlude, Mellonspill in Norwegian and Zwischenspiel in German, written in the Dorian mode as well.)
Fughetta'r, Versettes & Cantabilla	Versette	—	G minor	Piano solo	—	(Note: Fughettas Nos. II, VI, VII, and XIV for 4 voices; Nos. III–V, VIII–XIII, and XV for 3 voices. Fughetta XII written in the Dorian mode. Interlude, Mellonspill in Norwegian and Zwischenspiel in German, written in the Dorian mode as well.)
Fughetta'r, Versettes & Cantabilla	Fughetta VIII	—	G minor	Piano solo	—	(Note: Fughettas Nos. II, VI, VII, and XIV for 4 voices; Nos. III–V, VIII–XIII, and XV for 3 voices. Fughetta XII written in the Dorian mode. Interlude, Mellonspill in Norwegian and Zwischenspiel in German, written in the Dorian mode as well.)
Fughetta'r, Versettes & Cantabilla	Cantabille	—	G minor	Piano solo	—	(Note: Fughettas Nos. II, VI, VII, and XIV for 4 voices; Nos. III–V, VIII–XIII, and XV for 3 voices. Fughetta XII written in the Dorian mode. Interlude, Mellonspill in Norwegian and Zwischenspiel in German, written in the Dorian mode as well.)
Fughetta'r, Versettes & Cantabilla	Fughetta IX	—	G major	Piano solo	—	(Note: Fughettas Nos. II, VI, VII, and XIV for 4 voices; Nos. III–V, VIII–XIII, and XV for 3 voices. Fughetta XII written in the Dorian mode. Interlude, Mellonspill in Norwegian and Zwischenspiel in German, written in the Dorian mode as well.)
Fughetta'r, Versettes & Cantabilla	Fughetta X	—	G major	Piano solo	—	(Note: Fughettas Nos. II, VI, VII, and XIV for 4 voices; Nos. III–V, VIII–XIII, and XV for 3 voices. Fughetta XII written in the Dorian mode. Interlude, Mellonspill in Norwegian and Zwischenspiel in German, written in the Dorian mode as well.)
Fughetta'r, Versettes & Cantabilla	Fughetta XI	—	G major	Piano solo	—	(Note: Fughettas Nos. II, VI, VII, and XIV for 4 voices; Nos. III–V, VIII–XIII, and XV for 3 voices. Fughetta XII written in the Dorian mode. Interlude, Mellonspill in Norwegian and Zwischenspiel in German, written in the Dorian mode as well.)
Fughetta'r, Versettes & Cantabilla	Cantabille	—	C major	Piano solo	—	(Note: Fughettas Nos. II, VI, VII, and XIV for 4 voices; Nos. III–V, VIII–XIII, and XV for 3 voices. Fughetta XII written in the Dorian mode. Interlude, Mellonspill in Norwegian and Zwischenspiel in German, written in the Dorian mode as well.)
Fughetta'r, Versettes & Cantabilla	Cantabille	—	D major	Piano solo	—	(Note: Fughettas Nos. II, VI, VII, and XIV for 4 voices; Nos. III–V, VIII–XIII, and XV for 3 voices. Fughetta XII written in the Dorian mode. Interlude, Mellonspill in Norwegian and Zwischenspiel in German, written in the Dorian mode as well.)
Fughetta'r, Versettes & Cantabilla	Fughetta XII	—	D dorian	Piano solo	—	(Note: Fughettas Nos. II, VI, VII, and XIV for 4 voices; Nos. III–V, VIII–XIII, and XV for 3 voices. Fughetta XII written in the Dorian mode. Interlude, Mellonspill in Norwegian and Zwischenspiel in German, written in the Dorian mode as well.)
Fughetta'r, Versettes & Cantabilla	Interlude	—	D dorian	Piano solo	—	(Note: Fughettas Nos. II, VI, VII, and XIV for 4 voices; Nos. III–V, VIII–XIII, and XV for 3 voices. Fughetta XII written in the Dorian mode. Interlude, Mellonspill in Norwegian and Zwischenspiel in German, written in the Dorian mode as well.)
Fughetta'r, Versettes & Cantabilla	Fughetta XIII	—	D dorian	Piano solo	—	(Note: Fughettas Nos. II, VI, VII, and XIV for 4 voices; Nos. III–V, VIII–XIII, and XV for 3 voices. Fughetta XII written in the Dorian mode. Interlude, Mellonspill in Norwegian and Zwischenspiel in German, written in the Dorian mode as well.)
Fughetta'r, Versettes & Cantabilla	Versette	—	D minor	Piano solo	—	(Note: Fughettas Nos. II, VI, VII, and XIV for 4 voices; Nos. III–V, VIII–XIII, and XV for 3 voices. Fughetta XII written in the Dorian mode. Interlude, Mellonspill in Norwegian and Zwischenspiel in German, written in the Dorian mode as well.)
Fughetta'r, Versettes & Cantabilla	Fughetta XIV	—	D minor	Piano solo	—	(Note: Fughettas Nos. II, VI, VII, and XIV for 4 voices; Nos. III–V, VIII–XIII, and XV for 3 voices. Fughetta XII written in the Dorian mode. Interlude, Mellonspill in Norwegian and Zwischenspiel in German, written in the Dorian mode as well.)
Fughetta'r, Versettes & Cantabilla	Fughetta XV	—	E minor	Piano solo	—	(Note: Fughettas Nos. II, VI, VII, and XIV for 4 voices; Nos. III–V, VIII–XIII, and XV for 3 voices. Fughetta XII written in the Dorian mode. Interlude, Mellonspill in Norwegian and Zwischenspiel in German, written in the Dorian mode as well.)
Prelude to Fugue	—	—	—	Piano solo	—	—
A Minor Variation	—	—	—	Piano solo	—	—
Waltz	—	—	A minor	Piano solo	—	—
Adagio	—	—	D major	Piano solo	—	—
Prelude	—	—	G minor	Piano solo	—	—
Preludio Andantino - mixolidian d - da capo al fine	—	—	E minor	Piano solo	—	—
Preludio I	—	—	G major	Piano solo	—	—
Prelude	—	—	D major	Piano solo	—	—
Prelude (Picardian)	—	—	E	Piano solo	—	(Note: Written in the Phrygian mode.)
Fuga	—	—	D	Piano solo	—	(Note: Written in the Dorian mode.)
Prelude II	—	—	G major	Piano solo	—	—
Adagio	—	Alla breve	D minor	Piano solo	—	—
Prelude III	—	—	G major	Piano solo	—	—
Interlude	—	—	C major	Piano solo	—	—
Variations on the Hymn "Jesus styr du mine tanker"	—	—	G major	Piano solo	—	(Note: A Norwegian, eight-line-verse hymn translated as "Jesus, Guide Thou All My Thoughts", which has survived to our day thanks to oral tradition. It comes from the end of the 17th century, being first published in 1861 by Magnus Brostrup Landstad.)
Prelude on the Hymn "I Jesu Navn"	—	—	G minor	Piano solo	—	(Note: The well-known hymn among Norwegians, "I Jesu Navn skal al vor gjerning ske", translated as "Let all our works in the Name of Jesus be", was usually sung in the closing or opening of a service.)

== Bibliography ==
- (no) Dalaker, Ingrid Loe (2005): Thomas Tellefsen i norsk og fransk musikkultur (eng. Thomas Tellefsen in Norwegian and French music culture). Doctor of Musical Arts at the Norwegian University of Science and Technology.
- (no) Huldt-Nystrøm, Hampus (1959): Thomas Dyke Acland Tellefsen.
- (pl) Olszewski, Edward (2013): Fryderyk Chopin i Thomas Dyke Acland Tellefsen. Polsko - norweskie więzi muzyczne odkrywa pianistka Małgorzata Jaworska z Krakowa i norweskiego Arendal, Wydawnictwo Adam Marszałek, Toruń 2013, ISBN 978-83-7780-631-9.
- (en) Lim, Mikyung (December 2014): The Influence of Norwegian Folk Elements on Thomas Dyke Tellefsen’s Mazurkas Op. 3 (1849) and Op. 14 (1853). Doctor of Musical Arts (Performance) at the University of North Texas.
