= Séminaire de Québec =

Roman Catholic community of priests in Quebec City, Canada

Coordinates: 46°48′53″N 71°12′19″W

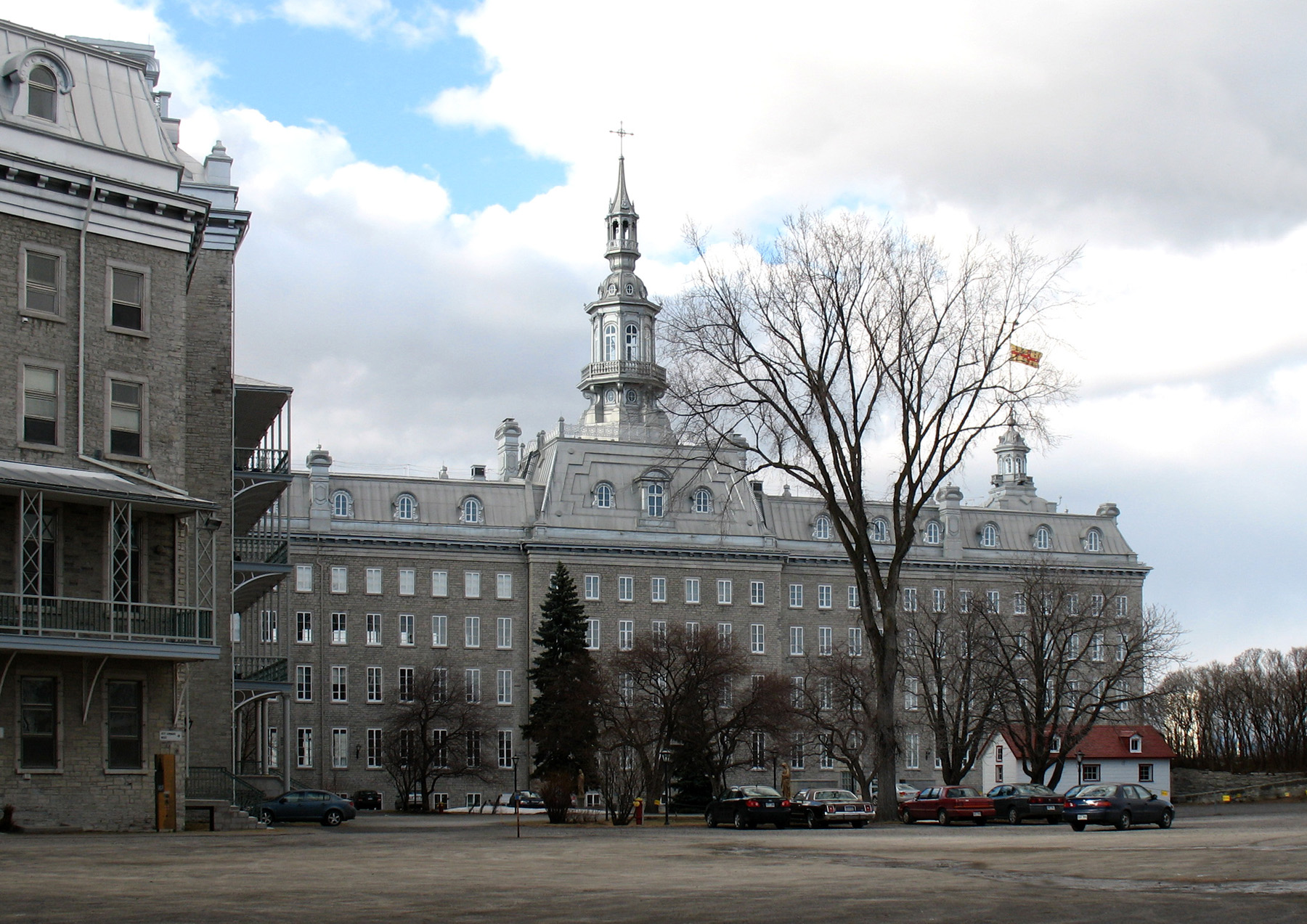
The Camille-Roy Building of the Séminaire de Québec

The Seminary of Quebec (French: Séminaire de Québec, pronounced [seminɛʁ də kebɛk]) is a Catholic diocesan seminary in Quebec City founded in 1663 by François de Laval, the first bishop of New France.

== History ==
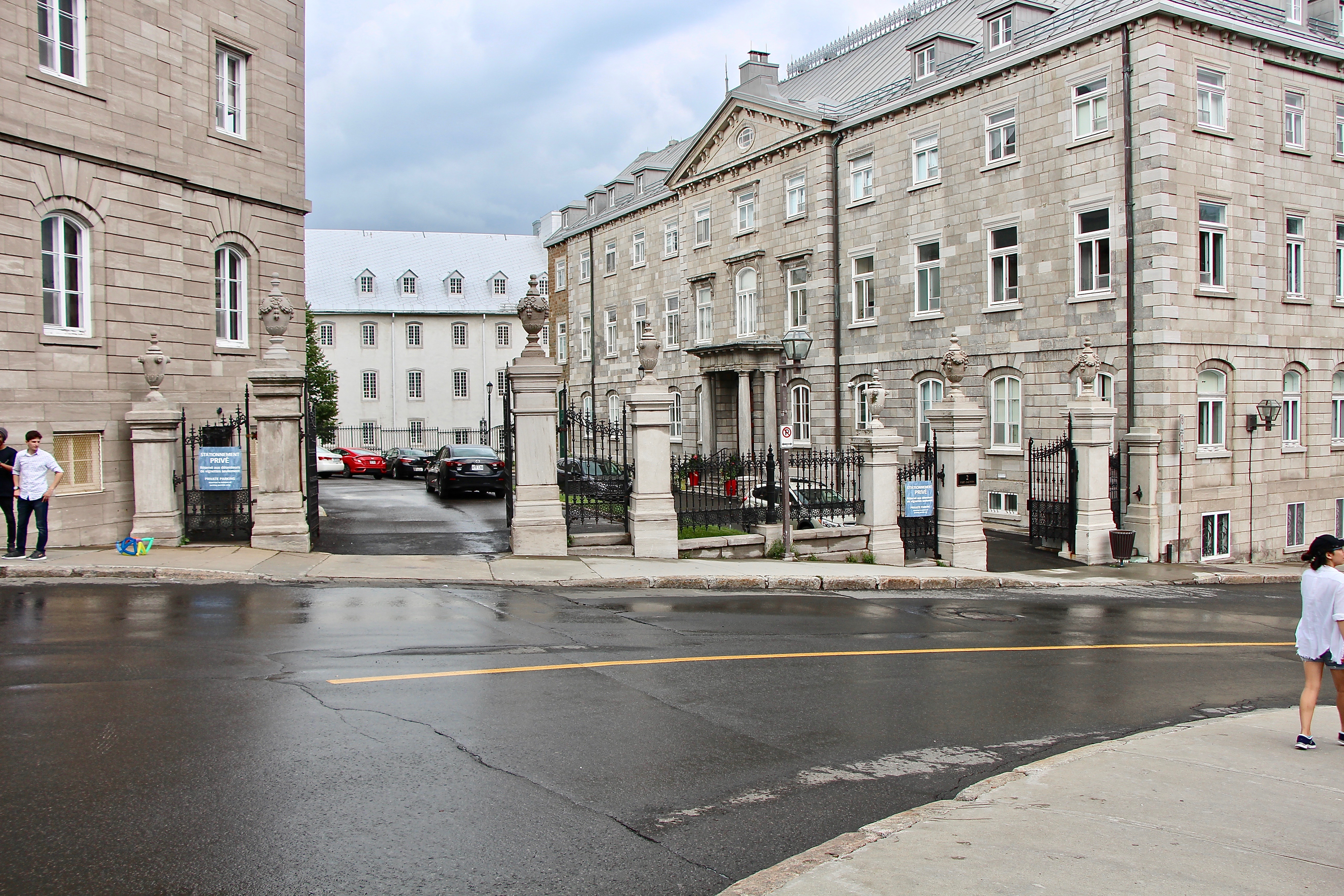
Gate of the Seminary, 2018

The Séminaire de Québec was founded on March 26, 1663, by Bishop François de Laval, first bishop of New France, in order to sustain the mission of the Church in North America. In 1665, he joined it to the Seminary of Foreign Missions of Paris under the name of the Seminary of Foreign Missions of Quebec, from which is derived the acronym SME, still in use today.

The first role of the Séminaire de Québec was to prepare young men for ordination and ministry in parishes and missions as far away as Louisiana. The seminary was thus founded together with the major seminary, where future priests received their training.

In 1668, Jean-Baptiste Colbert, Louis XIV's top minister, initiated an attempt to impose French language and culture on local aboriginal people. Bishop de Laval therefore opened the seminary to local aboriginal people as well as children of settlers with studious dispositions and a desire to enter the priesthood. This was the beginning of the Petit Séminaire de Québec (the minor seminary).

=== The Petit Séminaire ===
Until the English conquest in 1760, the minor seminary was a boarding school for students. Classes were held at the Jesuit College on the site of the present City Hall. When the Jesuits were suppressed after the conquest, the directors of the seminary took over. The minor seminary became a full-fledged teaching institution, a college, open to all boys interested in studying. In 1852, the high quality of teaching was recognized in a royal charter from Queen Victoria, leading to the founding of Université Laval, the first Catholic French-language university in North America.

In the early 1930s the Petit Seminaire hosted the young Gérard Raymond, who is the subject of a cause for sainthood. Since 1987, the Petit Séminaire de Québec has been a private Catholic secondary school separated from the Séminaire de Québec. Many French-Canadian clergy of the 18th and 19th century, as well as a number of academics, went through the Petit Séminaire before higher education became widely accessible. Until 1970, the Superior of the seminary was also the Rector of Université Laval, which was originally an offshoot of it. The seminary spun off Université Laval into its own corporation in 1970 and the same was done with the minor seminary in 1987. Université Laval and the minor seminary no longer have any legal ties with the Quebec Seminary.

=== The major seminary today ===
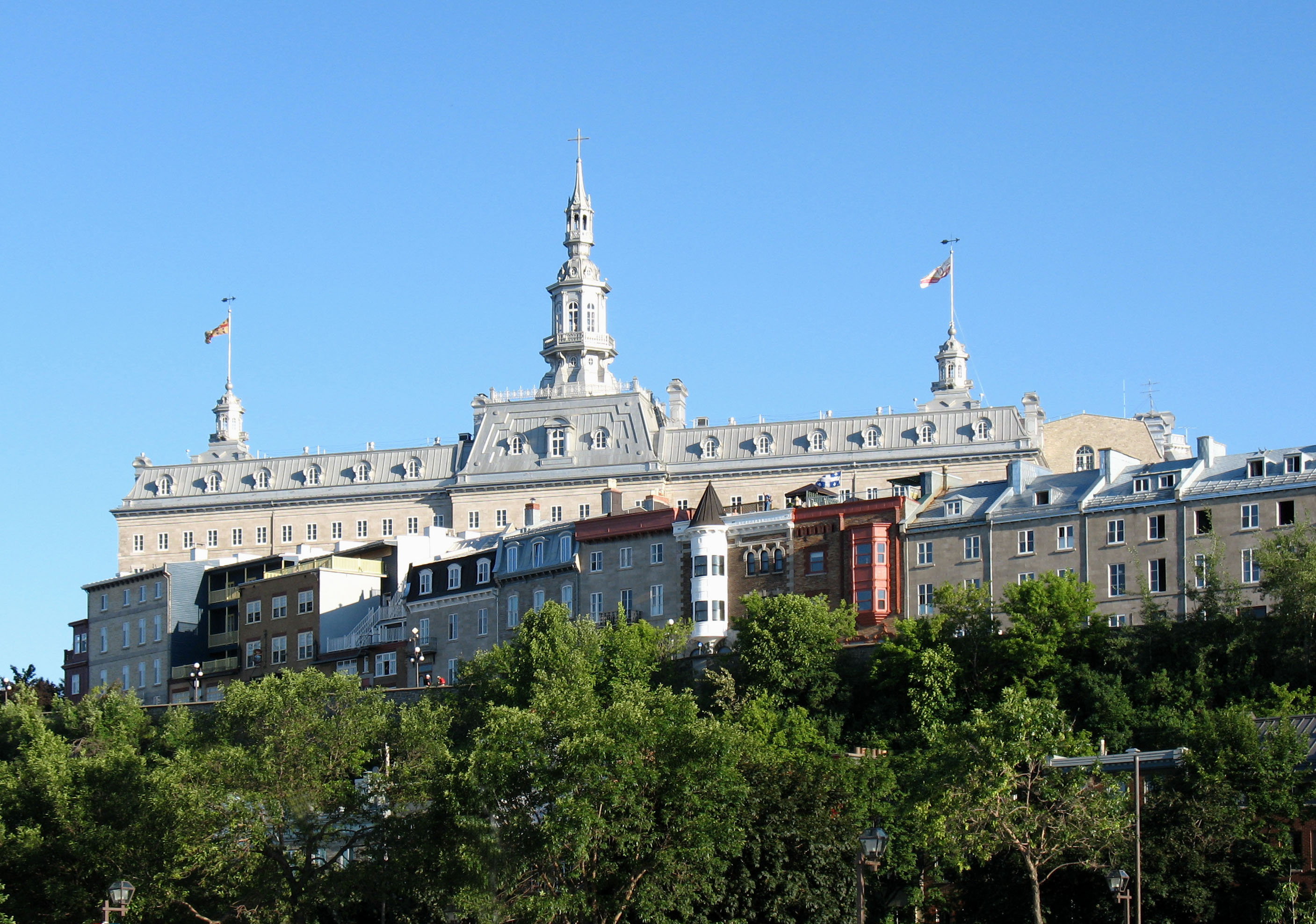
The Old Séminaire de Québec in 2008

The services of the Séminaire de Québec currently include the major seminary, a vocations centre, a new diocesan minor seminary, the Catholic centre at Université Laval, the training of priests and other pastoral leaders, parish service, and theology studies.

François de Laval's vision is at the root of the Séminaire de Québec's influence and success in education. His bequest of a large tract of lakes and forests northeast of the city known today as the Beaupré Seigneury, purchased from the Compagnie des 100 Associés (Compagnie de la Nouvelle-France), has funded the work of the institution ever since.

== Buildings ==
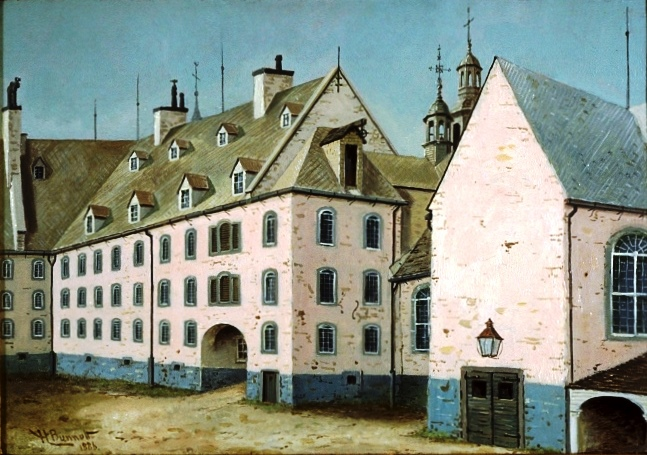
The Seminary, painting, 1886

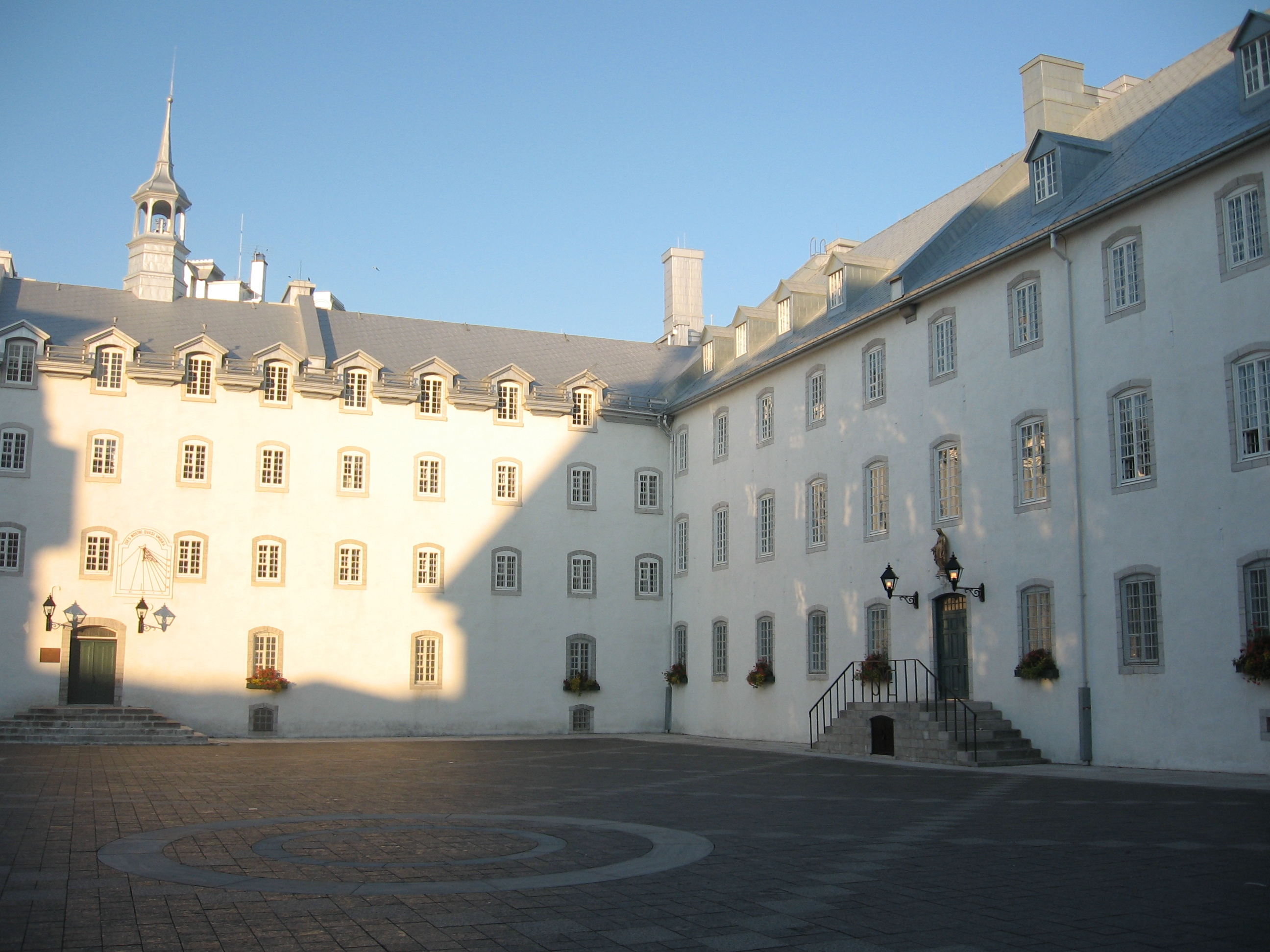
View of the Inner Court of Old Quebec Seminary

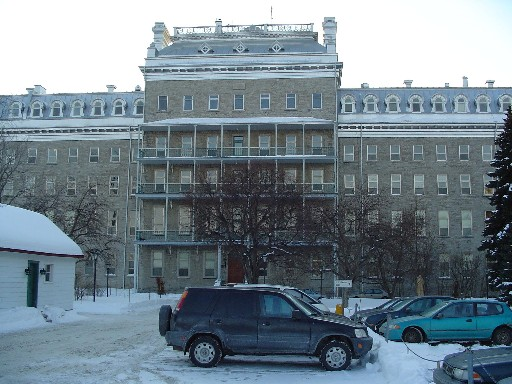
The residence of the priests and the Grand Séminaire

The historical site of the Séminaire de Québec in Old Quebec includes a vast number of buildings, some of which date back to the 17th century and are witnesses of the French occupation, while the others were constructed anywhere from the 18th to the 20th century. The ensemble is made up of two groups of buildings: the Vieux-Séminaire constructed under the model of 17th century French colleges, and the second group of buildings that have been added over the years to meet the needs of Laval University, the Grand Séminaire and the Petit Séminaire, whose most important buildings are the Camille-Roy Building and the Jean-Olivier-Briand Building. The Camille-Roy Building has several pinnacles on which continuously fly the flag of the coat of arms of founder of the Séminaire de Québec, Bishop François de Laval, and the Jean-Olivier-Briand Building houses the priests' residence and the Grand Séminaire.

The seminary at 1 Rempart Street, Québec, was designated a National Historic Site of Canada in 1929. This location continues to operate as a centre for educating Roman Catholic priests A section of the Vieux Séminaire has been the location for the Université's school of architecture since 1987. The Camille-Roy pavilion houses the restored Promotions Room which can be rented as a venue for various types of events.

== In popular media ==
The institution was the subject of Léonard Forest's 1964 documentary film Walls of Memory (Mémoire en fête).

== See also ==
- List of Jesuit sites
- Moulin du Petit-Pré, a water-powered flour mill built for the seminary

== Bibliography ==
- PROVOST, Honorius, Le Séminaire de Québec : documents et biographies, Québec, Séminaire de Québec, 1964. 542 p. (Publications des archives du Séminaire de Québec; 2)
- Cap-aux-Diamants, N° hors série (oct. 1993), Québec, Société historique de Québec, 1993. 70 p.
