= Mike Mountain Horse =

Canadian Soldier

Mike Mountain Horse (Miistatisomitai; 1888 – 1964) was an Indigenous Canadian soldier.

Mountain Horse attended residential school on the Kainai Nation reserve. After the death of his brother Albert Mountain Horse in the First World War, he enlisted in the Canadian Expeditionary Force and was sent overseas. He fought at the Battles of Vimy Ridge, Hill 70, and Cambrai (bayonetted there) in 1917, and at the Battle of Amiens in 1918. He received the Distinguished Conduct Medal for his service.

After returning to Canada in 1919, Mountain Horse joined the North-West Mounted Police, as either a scout or an interpreter. He subsequently worked as a labourer for the Canadian Pacific Railway and as a reporter for the Lethbridge Herald, and was elected to the Blood Tribal Council.

Mountain Horse created a buffalo-hide war robe recording the history of Indigenous peoples in the First World War. He also wrote a book, My People the Bloods, which was published posthumously in 1979. Actor Eugene Brave Rock read this book to prepare for the role of Chief in Wonder Woman.

He is the namesake of Mike Mountain Horse Elementary School in Lethbridge, Alberta.
