= Albert Mountain Horse =

Indigenous Canadian Soldier

Albert Mountain Horse (Kukutosi-poota; 25 December 1893 – 19 November 1915) was an Indigenous Canadian soldier.

Mountain Horse was born on the Blood Indian Reserve to Mountain Horse and Sikski. His parents were heavily involved in Indigenous traditional societies and he was dedicated at birth to the Above-Person. He attended the St. Paul's Boarding School, headed by Samuel Henry Middleton, where he joined a cadet corps. He later attended a Calgary military school. At the outbreak of the First World War he was a commissioned officer in the Canadian Militia with the rank of lieutenant with the 23rd Alberta Rangers and was working as a cadet instructor, but he enlisted as a private with the Canadian Expeditionary Force in order to deploy sooner. He was likely the first Indigenous man from Alberta to enlist.

Although he survived the Second Battle of Ypres, he was subsequently gassed twice and was sent back to Canada to convalesce. However, the impact of the gas on his lungs resulted in his death from tuberculosis the day after his arrival. His funeral was led by John William Tims.

His service and death was controversial. The Blood had been assured of protection by Treaty 7 and felt that in encouraging Mountain Horse to enlist Middleton had breached this treaty. After Mountain Horse's death his mother attempted to stab Middleton. The agent for the reserve argued on the basis of Mountain Horse's death that Indigenous peoples should not be enlisted because of their "tendency to develop consumption" (tuberculosis).

After Albert's death his brothers Joe and Mike Mountain Horse enlisted and were sent overseas, "no doubt to seek revenge".
