= Read Fletcher =

American politician (c. 1829–1889)

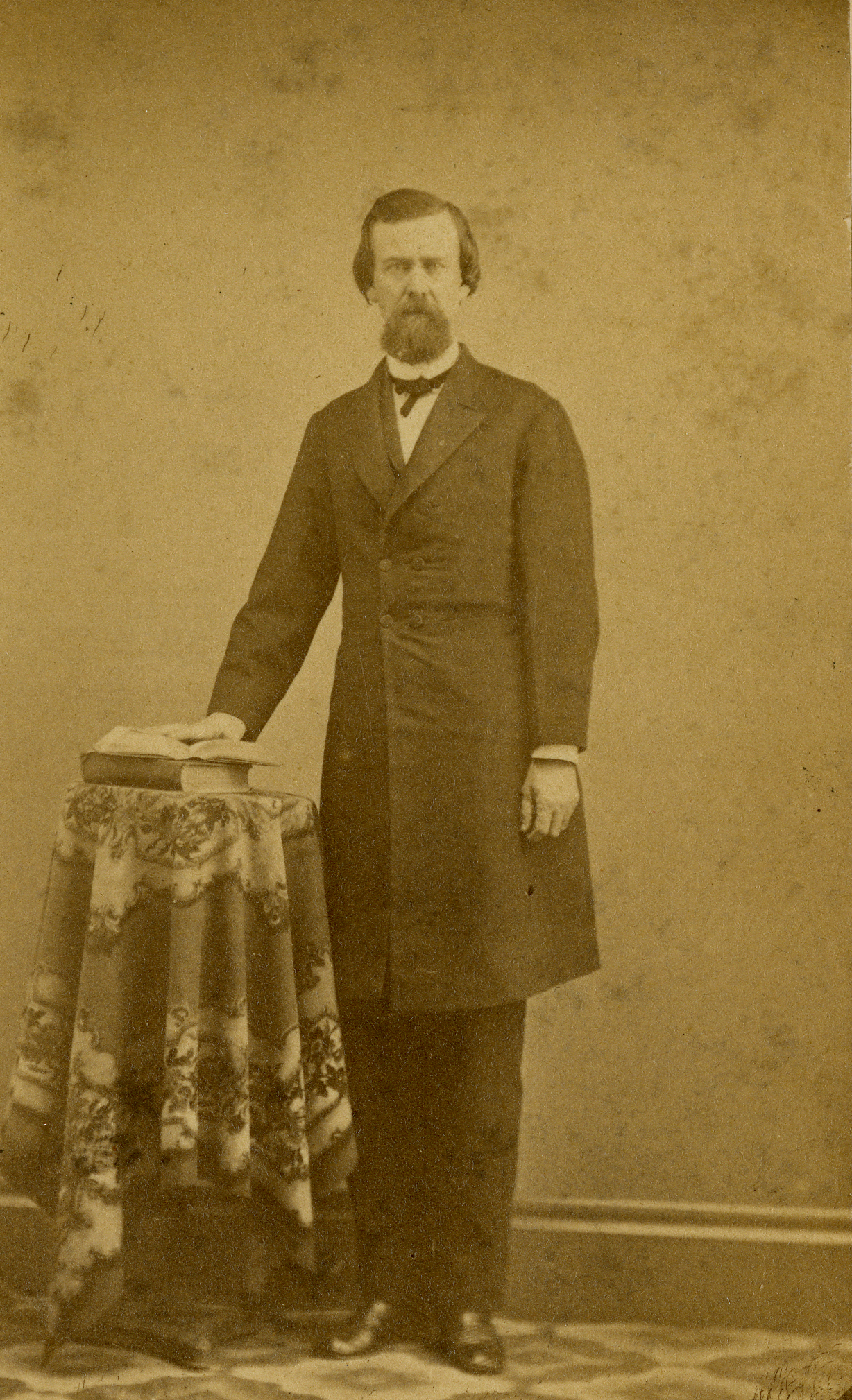

Member of the Arkansas House of Representatives from Jefferson County
- In office November 5, 1866 – April 2, 1868 Serving with Witt Williamson, Jr.
- Preceded by: H. B. Allis; D. C. Hardeman
- Succeeded by: Constituency abolished

Postmaster of Pine Bluff
- In office January 11, 1856 – May 13, 1856
- Nominated by: Franklin Pierce
- Preceded by: Joseph Merrill
- Succeeded by: Thomas B. Morris

Personal details
- Born: c. 1829 Nashville, Tennessee, U.S.
- Died: November 21, 1889 (aged 59–60) Pine Bluff, Arkansas, U.S.
- Cause of death: Tuberculosis
- Party: Democratic
- Spouse: Eliza Tucker (m. 1855)
- Relatives: Thomas Fletcher (brother)
- Education: Cumberland University (dropped out)

Military service
- Allegiance: Confederate States
- Branch: Army
- Years of service: 1861–1865
- Rank: Captain
- Commands: Company A, 9th Arkansas Infantry Regiment (1861); Company D, 18th Arkansas Infantry Regiment (1862–65)
- Wars: American Civil War

Read Fletcher (c. 1829 – November 21, 1889) was an American politician, lawyer, co-founder and editor of the Pine Bluff Graphic. Besides service on state court benches, he represented Jefferson County in the Arkansas House of Representatives. He previously served with the C.S. Army during the Civil War.

== See also ==
- List of tuberculosis cases
- List of United States attorneys for the Eastern District of Arkansas

== Notes ==
Political offices
Preceded by Joseph Merrill	Postmaster of Pine Bluff; 1856	Succeeded by Thomas B. Morris
Arkansas House of Representatives
Preceded by H. B. Allis; D. C. Hardeman	Member of the Arkansas House of Representatives from Jefferson County; 1866–1868; With: Witt Williamson, Jr.	Constituency abolished
