= Jane Stirling =

Scottish amateur pianist (1804–1859)

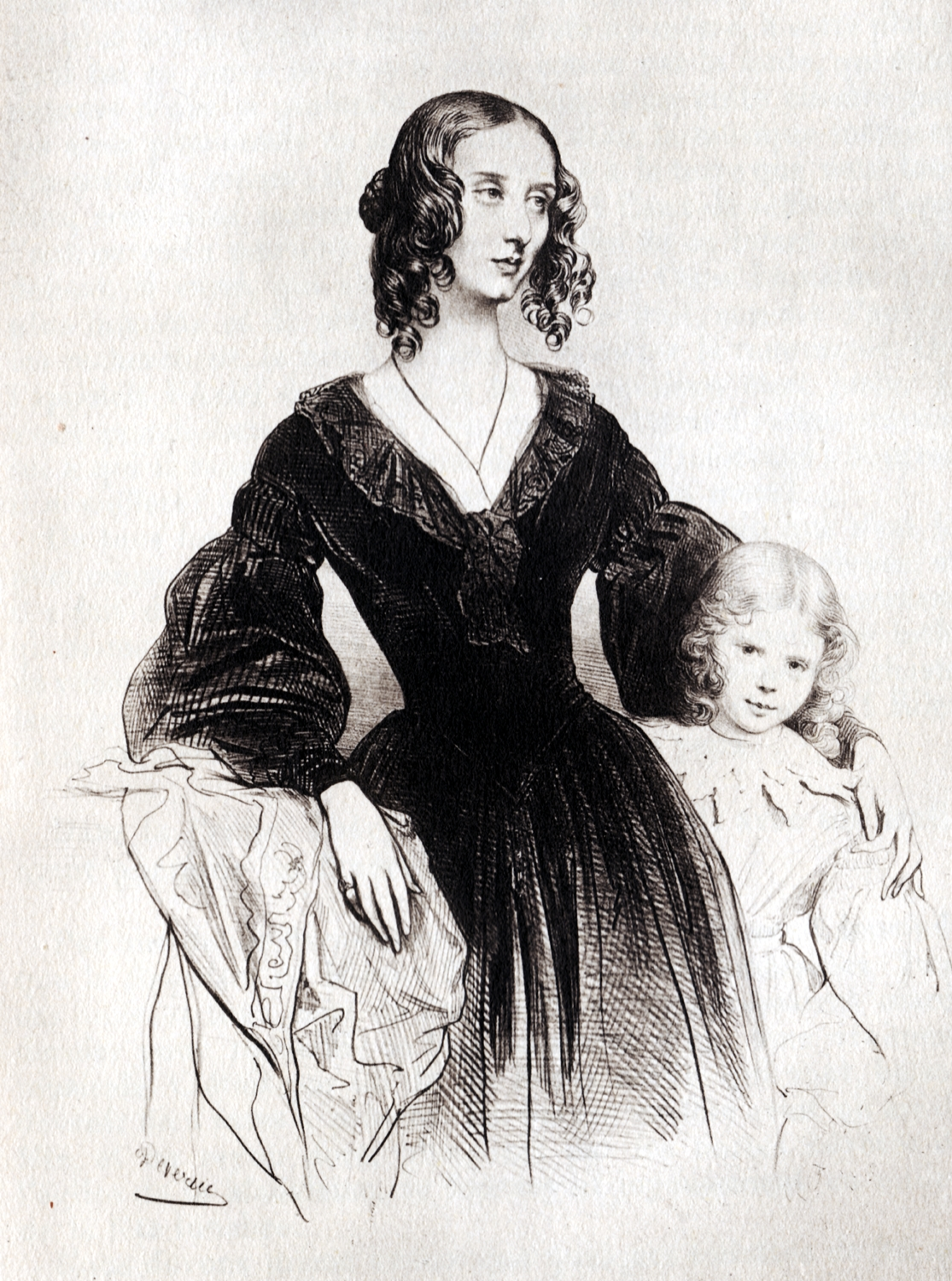
Jane Stirling with Fanny Elgin

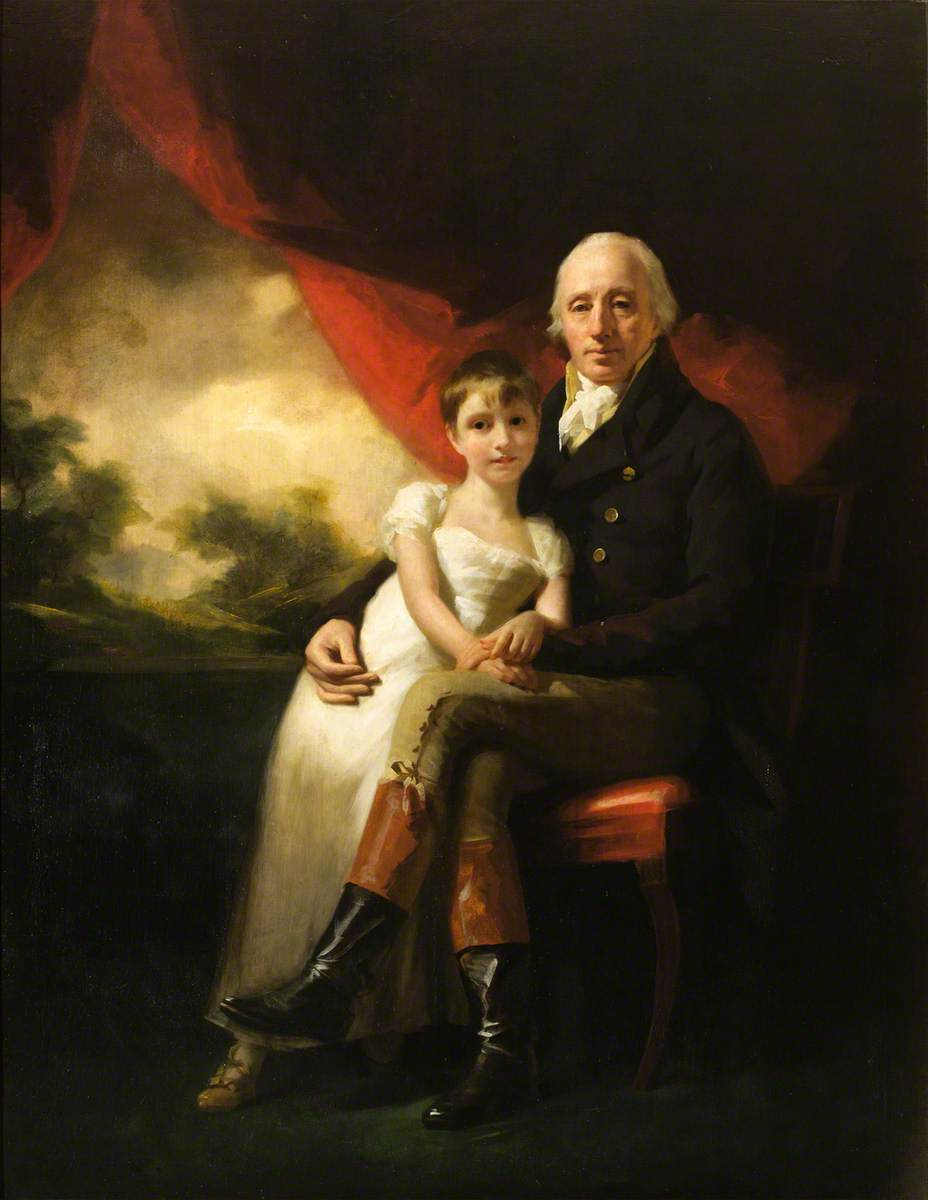
Jane Stirling with her father, John Stirling of Kippendavie

Jean ("Jane") Wilhelmina Stirling (15 July 1804 – 6 February 1859) was a Scottish amateur pianist who is best known as a student and later friend of Frédéric Chopin, who dedicated Nocturnes, Op. 55 to her. She took him on a tour of England and Scotland in 1848, and took charge of the disposal of his effects and manuscripts after his death in 1849.

== Life ==
Jane Stirling was born Jean Wilhelmina Stirling as the youngest of 13 children of John Stirling of Kippendavie, at Kippenross House, near Dunblane in Perthshire, and was descended from a noble Scottish family. Her father died when Jane was 12, and her mother died when she was 16. Her inheritance made her a wealthy young woman. She was then placed under the charge of her widowed sister, Mrs Katherine Erskine, aged 29. She was popular and very pretty; she was said to have declined over 30 marriage proposals. From 1826, she and her sister divided their social life between Scotland and Paris. She involved herself not only in music and the arts, but also in subjects such as prison reform, homeopathy, and the Protestant movement.

=== Chopin ===
The pianist Lindsay Sloper claimed to have been the one to introduce her to Frédéric Chopin, perhaps in 1842 or 1843. She became his pupil immediately. Chopin does not mention her until 1844. That she was a talented pianist was evident from Chopin's remark to her, "One day you’ll play very, very well." Towards the end of his life he even entrusted one of his own pupils, Vera Rubio, to her tutoring. In 1844 he dedicated his two Nocturnes, Op. 55 to her. She also expressed a desire to learn the cello, and so Chopin referred her to his collaborator, Auguste Franchomme.

Jane Stirling worked with Chopin in assembling seven bound volumes of the French editions of most of his works, and in compiling a thematic index. These volumes were later used by the French musicologist and Chopin biographer Édouard Ganche to establish the Oxford original edition of Chopin. However, whether Chopin intended this collection to serve as a basis for a revised collected edition of his music is an open question. She also became his secretary, agent and business manager. She arranged his concert at the Salle Pleyel on 16 February 1848, and also attended to the heating, the ventilation, and the flowers. The concluding item of the concert was the Barcarolle in F-sharp major, but Chopin was too exhausted to complete the final section. After managing to walk unaided to his dressing room, he collapsed in Jane Stirling's arms. This was to prove his final Paris concert. There had been plans for another concert there in March, but on 23 February a revolution broke out, many people fled the city, and Chopin was suddenly deprived of his livelihood.

She studied the piano further under Thomas Tellefsen, himself a Chopin pupil. Jane and her sister suggested that Chopin perform a series of concerts in England. He was ill and did not want to travel, but as he was in need of the money that such a tour would provide for him, he agreed. They left for London on 20 April 1848. Through Jane Stirling he was introduced to the crème of British society. He played at a private function on 15 May which Queen Victoria and Prince Albert attended (but he was never invited to play for them at Buckingham Palace, as is sometimes claimed).

By August, the London season being at an end, he accepted an invitation from Jane Stirling to visit her homeland of Scotland. It was an exhausting 12-hour train journey, but Chopin appreciated the hospitality of the Stirling sisters, who he said "even bring me the Paris newspapers every day" near Edinburgh, at Calder House, the castle of Lord Torphichen, the ladies' brother-in-law. (Calder House was where in 1556 John Knox had first celebrated communion.) He went on to give a "very select" concert in Glasgow, staying with Stirling's sister Ann at Johnstone Castle. Jane Stirling dragged him from one wealthy relative to another, including the Stirling clan chief, William Stirling at Keir House, Dunblane, an art collector and going from city to city; Chopin found himself meeting many people with whom he could not converse (he spoke only French and Polish) which only made his physical condition worse. In Manchester, on 28 August, he played three pieces, but was so weak he had to be carried on and off the stage. All his expenses throughout the tour were paid by Jane. It was during this tour, in late October 1848 in Edinburgh, at the home of Dr Adam Łyszczyński, a Polish physician with whom he stayed for a number of days, that Chopin wrote his last will and testament – "a kind of disposition to be made of my stuff in the future, if I should drop dead somewhere," he wrote to his friend Wojciech Grzymała.

Although she was almost six years older than Chopin (she was born in July 1804, the same month as George Sand), it was generally rumored at this time that Chopin and Stirling were shortly to be engaged. This never happened; indeed, there is no indication in any of Chopin's letters that he ever felt any amorous feelings for her. On the contrary, she often bored him. He said to a friend: "They have married me to Miss Stirling; she might as well marry death." To another he wrote: "I'm nearer the grave than the nuptial bed." He referred to both Stirling and Mrs. Erskine as "mes braves Écossaises", and was frequently exasperated by their oversolicitude, saying "They will suffocate me with their goodness", and by her sister Ann's habit of bringing him religious pamphlets.

His final concert in Britain was on 16 November at London's Guildhall, where he played despite being desperately ill. They returned to Paris on 24 November accompanied by mountainous debts, which Jane Stirling paid anonymously.

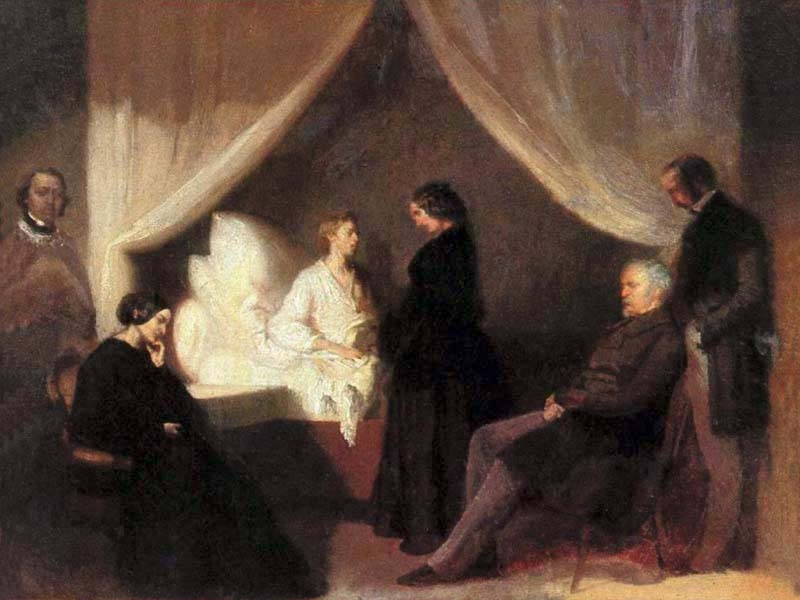
Chopin on His Deathbed, by Teofil Kwiatkowski, 1849, commissioned by Jane Stirling. Chopin sits in bed, in the presence of (from left) Aleksander Jełowicki, Chopin's sister Ludwika Jędrzejewicz, Marcelina Czartoryska, Wojciech Grzymała, and Kwiatkowski himself.

During Chopin's last weeks in 1849, Stirling commissioned the Polish artist Teofil Kwiatkowski to produce an oil painting of Chopin, which also included Chopin's sister Ludwika (Louisa) Jędrzejewicz, Marcelina Czartoryska and Wojciech Grzymała.

In September 1849, Chopin took an apartment at Place Vendôme 12. The second-floor, seven-room apartment had previously housed the Russian Embassy; Chopin could not afford it, but Jane Stirling rented it for him.

A few days before Chopin's death on 17 October, she purchased his grand piano. She paid the total cost of his funeral; all the travelling expenses from Warsaw of Chopin's sister Ludwika; and for his piano to be shipped to her in Warsaw. She purchased all of Chopin's remaining furniture and effects, including his death mask by Auguste Clésinger. She had some of the furniture shipped to Calder House near Edinburgh. It was displayed in a special room which became known as the Chopin Museum. She also collected various manuscripts, sketches, letters and other papers of his, containing handwritten comments, variants and dedications. She had a considerable correspondence with Ludwika Jędrzejewicz concerning the posthumous publication of some of his unpublished works, and 25 of these letters are now in the Muzeum Fryderyka Chopina in Warsaw.

Chopin had told Jane Stirling that she was the only one who knew his true date of birth. She wrote it down and placed it in a box which is buried with him in Père Lachaise Cemetery. On the first anniversary of his death she scattered over Chopin's grave some Polish soil that she had obtained from Ludwika.

Jane Stirling died on 6 February 1859, aged 54, of an ovarian cyst. She was buried on 11 February in the grounds of Dunblane Cathedral. Her will bequeathed her Chopin museum to Chopin's mother Justyna Chopin. In 1863 much of it was destroyed when Russian troops pillaged Warsaw's Zamoyski palace in reprisal for Polish attempts on the life of the Russian viceroy (Namiestnik) of Poland, Friedrich Wilhelm Rembert von Berg. One item which still exists is a lock of Chopin's auburn hair which Jane had kept.
