= Samuel Middleton (priest) =

Samuel Henry Middleton (1884–1964) was Archdeacon of Lethbridge from 1943 to 1951.

Middleton was born in Burton-on-Trent, educated at St John's College, Winnipeg and ordained in 1913. His first post was at Blood Reserve after which he was the Bishop's Chaplain for the First Nations people until his appointment as Archdeacon.
