= Gérard Raymond =

Catholic diocesan seminarian

Servant of God Gerard Raymond
- Born: Joseph-Louis-Gerard Raymond; 29 August 1912; St. Malo, Quebec, Canada
- Residence: Petit Seminaire de Quebec
- Died: 5 July 1932 (aged 19); Hôpital Laval, Quebec
- Cause of death: tuberculosis
- Venerated in: Catholic Church
- Major shrine: St. Charles Cemetery, Quebec
- Patronage: youth, seminarians, students, people who struggle with shyness

Gérard Raymond (b. 1912 – 5 July 1932) was a Canadian Catholic diocesan seminarian who died in 1932 at the age of 19. He was declared a Servant of God in 1968 and, as of 2023, a cause for sainthood was underway.

== Life ==
Gérard Raymond was the son of Camille Raymond and Josephine Poitras. He entered the Petit Seminaire de Quebec at the age of 12 in the hopes of becoming a diocesan priest however he later aspired to become a Franciscan missionary in Africa and dreamed of dying as a martyr.

Raymond was a pious young man and diligent student who devoted many hours each day to his daily duties of study and prayer, following a strict regimen which he designed for himself. He frequently attained the highest grades in his class.

He developed a devotion to Saint Therese and Saint Gemma Galgani, frequently invoking them in his journal entries. He read The Story of a Soul, which inspired him, and he implemented the spiritual teaching of St. Therese in his daily life.

He was hospitalized in 1932 with pulmonary tuberculosis and died after a short stay at the Laval Hospital in Quebec.

Raymond's sanctity went unnoticed until after his death, when his journal was discovered among his effects. His journal entries revealed his faith and zeal for holiness. In total, his spiritual journal had eight notebooks which contained insights into his thoughts, feelings, struggles and activities in the pursuit of sanctity. Segments of this journal were taken and published following his death.
