= Marcelina Czartoryska =

Polish aristocrat and pianist (1817 - 1894)

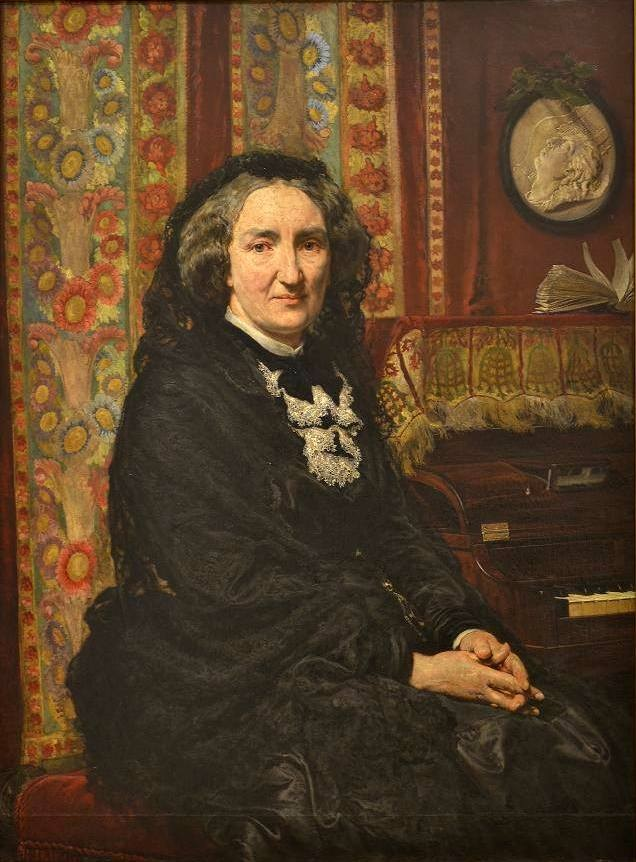
Portrait by Jan Matejko, 1874

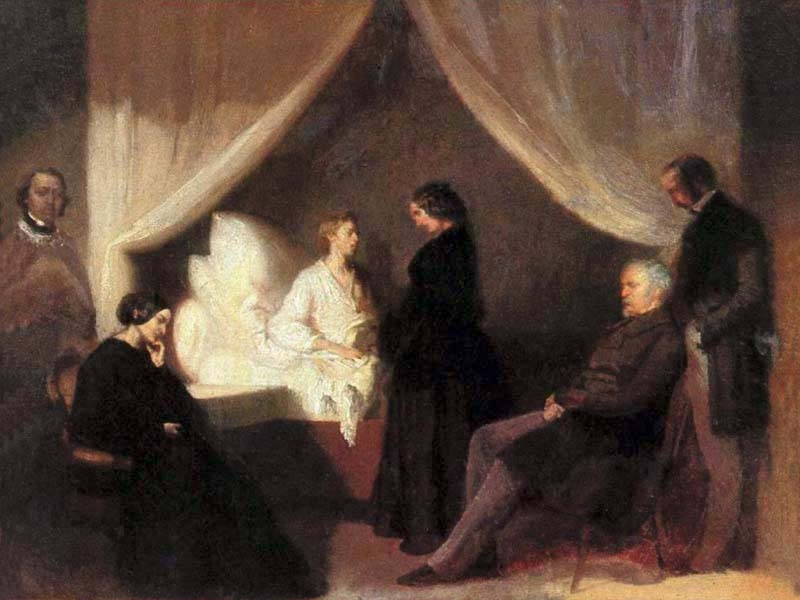
Chopin on His Deathbed, by Kwiatkowski, 1849, commissioned by Jane Stirling. Chopin sits in bed, in presence of (from left) Aleksander Jełowicki, Chopin's sister Ludwika, Princess Marcelina Czartoryska, Wojciech Grzymała, Kwiatkowski himself.

Princess Marcelina Czartoryska (née Radziwiłł, 18 May 1817 − 5 June 1894) was a Polish aristocrat and pianist.

== Life ==
Born in Podłużne into the Radziwiłłs family, in 1840 she married Aleksander Czartoryski, an aristocrat from a family of no lesser notability.

She was taught piano by Carl Czerny in Vienna and by Frédéric Chopin in Paris. She gave concerts across Europe, often with prominent musicians such as Franz Liszt, Pauline Viardot and Henri Vieuxtemps.

In Paris, she became a prominent guest at the Hôtel Lambert, bought by Prince Adam Jerzy Czartoryski, a close relative of her husband Aleksander. In 1849, she was present at the deathbed of Chopin, as she was his student and friend

From 1870, she lived in Kraków, where she gave mainly private concerts and, thanks to her artistic connections, contributed to founding a Conservatory in 1888. She died in 1894 and was buried at the Rakowicki Cemetery.

== Bibliography ==
- Stanisław Dybowski, Słownik pianistów polskich (Dictionary of Polish Pianists), Przedsiębiorstwo Muzyczne "Selene", Warsaw, 2003.
- Stanisław Tarnowski, Księżna Marcelina Czartoryska, Kraków,1895.
