= Teofil Kwiatkowski =

Polish painter

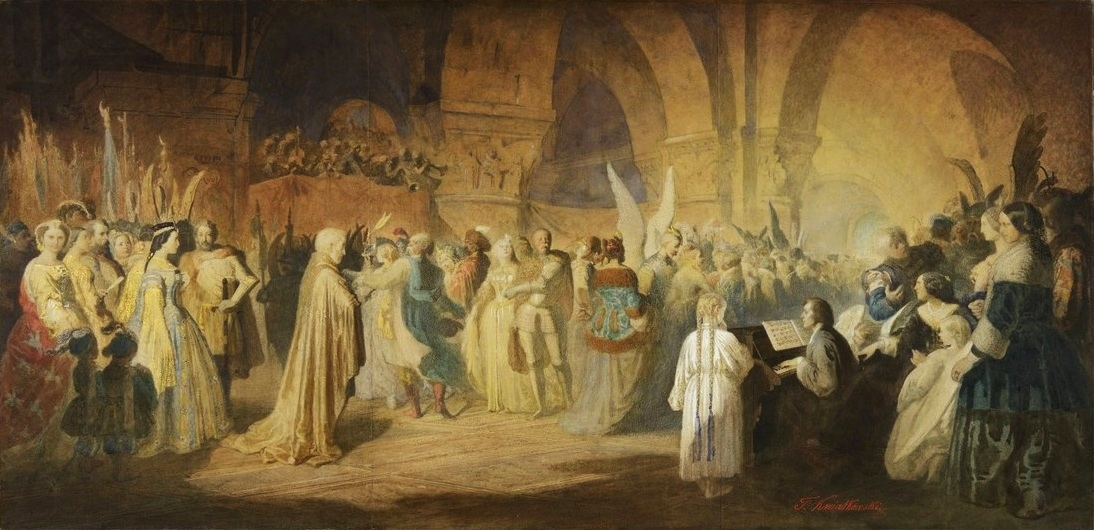
Frédéric Chopin playing at Paris's Hôtel Lambert. Vaulting (background) is temporary stage scenery. Watercolor and gouache by Teofil Kwiatkowski.

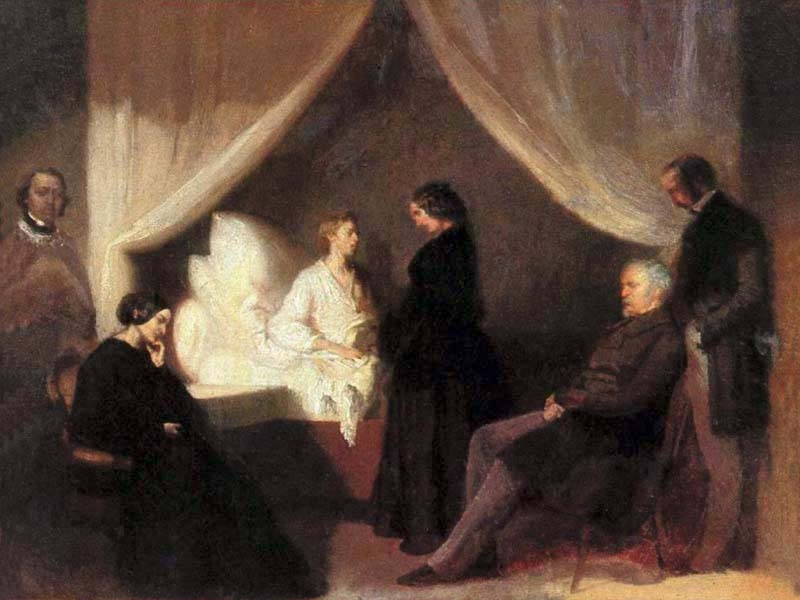
Chopin on His Deathbed, by Teofil Kwiatkowski, 1849, commissioned by Jane Stirling. Chopin sits in bed, in presence of (from left) Aleksander Jełowicki, Chopin's sister Ludwika, Marcelina Czartoryska, Wojciech Grzymała, Teofil Kwiatkowski.

Teofil Antoni Jaksa of Griffins Kwiatkowski (February 21, 1809 in Pułtusk – August 14, 1891 in Avallon, France) was a Polish painter.

== Life ==
Kwiatkowski participated in the November 1830 Uprising. After its suppression, he emigrated to France. He stayed in a facility for Polish war refugees in Avallon till 1832. He then attended painting studies held by Léon Cogniet.

Kwiatkowski was a close friend to Adam Mickiewicz and Frédéric Chopin.

His artistic work includes many images of Frédéric Chopin, including a picture of him playing at a ball at Paris's Hôtel Lambert and Chopin on His Deathbed (1849). He presented fantastic illustrations for Chopin musical pieces.

== See also ==
- Great Emigration
- List of Poles
- Léon Cogniet
- Hôtel Lambert
