= Mary Eliza Herbert =

Canadian publisher and poet

- Born: 1829; Halifax, Nova Scotia
- Died: July 15, 1872 (aged 42–43); Halifax, Nova Scotia
- Other names: Marion; M.E.H.; M.; H.
- Occupation: Writer
- Family: Sarah Herbert (half-sister)

Mary Eliza Herbert (1829–1872) was a Canadian publisher and poet. She published and managed the Mayflower, or Ladies' Acadian Newspaper in 1851, making her the first female newspaper publisher in Nova Scotia.

== Biography ==
Herbert was born in Halifax, Nova Scotia, in 1829 to Irish immigrant parents Catherine and Nicholas Michael Herbert. She began writing at a young age, following in the footsteps of her older half-sister Sarah Herbert. Herbert also had four younger siblings, Catherine Anne (b. 1831), John Otway Cuffe (b. 1833), Nicholas Livingston (b. 1836), and William Black (b. 1838).

Herbert was active in the Wesleyan Methodist evangelical group and the temperance movement. Herbert was a member of the Benevolent Society and the Temperance Society.

Herbert died in at her father's home in Halifax on July 15, 1872, after a long illness of "chronic gastroses" which was likely tuberculosis.

== Career ==
Herbert founded The Mayflower, or Ladies' Acadian Newspaper in 1851 as a periodical directed at women featuring local writers devoted to Methodism. Much of her work with The Mayflower was published under the pseudonyms Marion, M.E.H., M., and H.. The Mayflower's last publication was in February 1852. Through The Mayflower, Herbert published her novellas "Emily Linwood; or The Bow of Promise" and "Ambrose Mandeville". Herbert was the first Nova Scotian woman to edit and publish a magazine.

After her sister Sarah's 1846 death, Mary Eliza Herbert published The Aeolian Harp, a collection featuring poetry from both Sarah and herself, in 1857.

Herbert published Flowers by the Wayside: A Miscellany of Prose and Verse in 1865 at her own expense. Flowers by the Wayside thematically focuses on women's struggles. Herbert's novels were exclusively self-published as Nova Scotia had no book publishing firms in her lifetime. Her shorter works were published in several Halifax newspapers including the Acadian Reporter, the Halifax Morning Sun and The Nova Scotian.

== Bibliography ==
Novels:

- Woman As She Should Be: Or, Agnes Wiltshire (1859)
- Belinda Dalton: Or, Scenes In The Life Of A Halifax Belle (1861)
- A Young Man's Choice (1869)
- Lucy Cameron (unfinished)

Poetry collections:

- The Aeolian Harp (1857) with Sarah Herbert
- Flowers by the Wayside: A Miscellany of Prose and Verse (1865)
