= Sarah Herbert =

Nova Scotian author (1824–1846)

- Born: Sarah Herbert; October 1824; Ireland
- Died: 22 December 1846 (aged 22); Halifax

Sarah Herbert (1824–1846), was an Irish-Nova Scotian writer, publisher and educator.

== Life ==
Sarah Herbert was born to Nicholas Michael Herbert and Ann Bates in Ireland in October 1824. Her father emigrated to Canada in 1826. He took his young family with him, headed for Quebec, aboard the Nassau which was wrecked off the coast of Sable Island, Nova Scotia, on 13 May 1826. Ann Bates died soon after while her daughter was one of two infants saved that day. Herbert's father married again in Halifax on 3 September 1828. His second wife was Catherine Eagan. They later had a second child, Mary Eliza.

Herbert and her sister were both writers. Herbert submitted poetry and stories regularly to journals such as the Olive Branch, the Morning Herald, Commercial Advertiser, and the Novascotian, the Amaranth and the British North American Wesleyan Methodist Magazine. In September 1843, she won a contest supported by the Olive Branch with her serial Agnes Maitland. By 19 April 1844, Herbert had become the editor and proprietor of the Olive Branch. She published writers such as Harriet Beecher Stowe and Catharine Sedgwick and John McPherson. During the 1840s, Herbert also ran a local school and was a Sunday school teacher. She was secretary of the Halifax Female Temperance Society.

However, Herbert had poor health and her writing indicated she knew she was terminally ill. The paper she published collapsed in 1845 and Herbert died of consumption on 21 December 1846.

== Bibliography ==
- Agnes Maitland, a temperance tale, (1843)
- The history of a Halifax belle, (1844)
- The Æolian harp; or, miscellaneous poems (1857)
