= Wojciech Grzymała =

Polish soldier, politician and banker

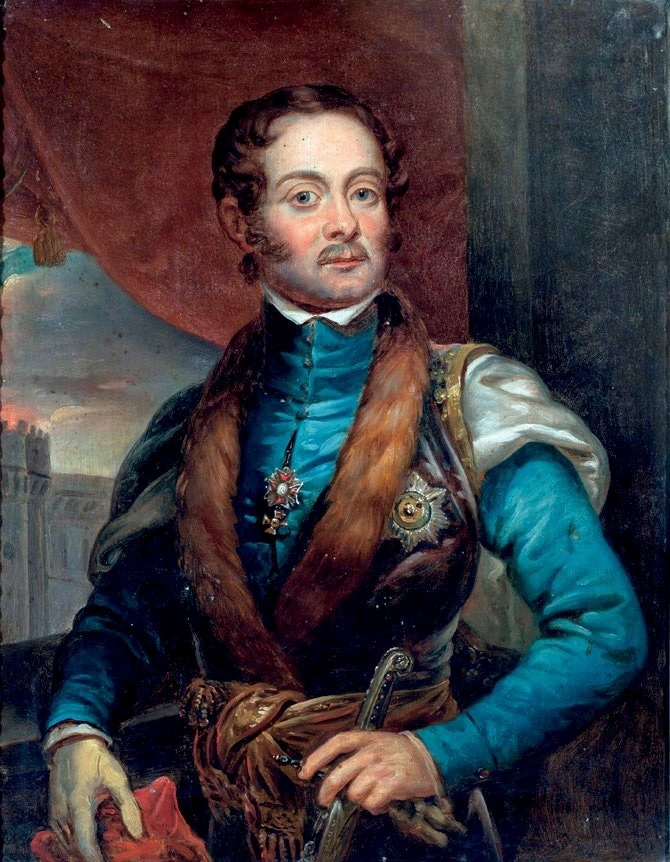
Wojciech Grzymała (National Museum, Warsaw)

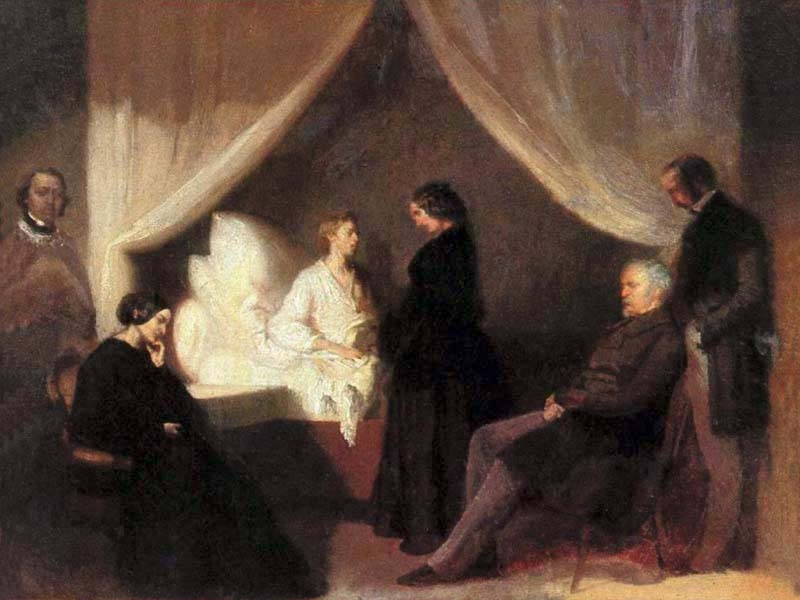
Grzymała features (seated, right) in Teofil Kwiatkowski's 1850 canvas, The last moments of Frédéric Chopin

Wojciech Grzymała (23 April 1793 – 16 December 1871), also known as Albert Grzymala or Albert Grzymała, was a Polish soldier, politician, and banker who was a close associate in Paris of Polish composer Frédéric Chopin.

Grzymała was born in Dunajowce (now Dunaivtsi, Ukraine). He began attending military school in 1807, and took part in the Battle of Borodino (1812), for which he received the medal Virtuti Militari. A freemason, and active in Polish politics during the 1820s, he was a principal orator at the funeral of Stanisław Staszic (1826). In 1828-1829, he was imprisoned in the Peter and Paul Fortress in St. Petersburg for his association with the Polish Patriotic Society. As a director of the Bank Polski, he negotiated in London and Paris for financial and other support for Poland after the 1830 November Uprising.

Grzymała remained in Paris and became a society figure. He often acted as Chopin's adviser and "gradually began to fill the role of elder brother in [his] life." He was a frequent correspondent of both Chopin and of George Sand; Sand, in a letter to Grzymała of June 1838, admitted her strong feelings for the composer and debated whether to abandon a current affair in order to begin a relationship with Chopin.

Grzymała died, a bankrupt, in Nyon, Geneva, in 1871.
