= Hôtel Lambert (Polish political group) =

19th century Polish political group

Hôtel Lambert Hotel Lambert
- Leader: Adam Jerzy Czartoryski; Władysław Stanisław Zamoyski
- Founded: 1833
- Dissolved: 1860s
- Headquarters: Hôtel Lambert, Paris, July Monarchy
- Ideology: Constitutional monarchism Conservative liberalism Later: Liberal conservatism Emancipation of peasants with compensation for landowners
- Political position: Centre-right to Right-wing

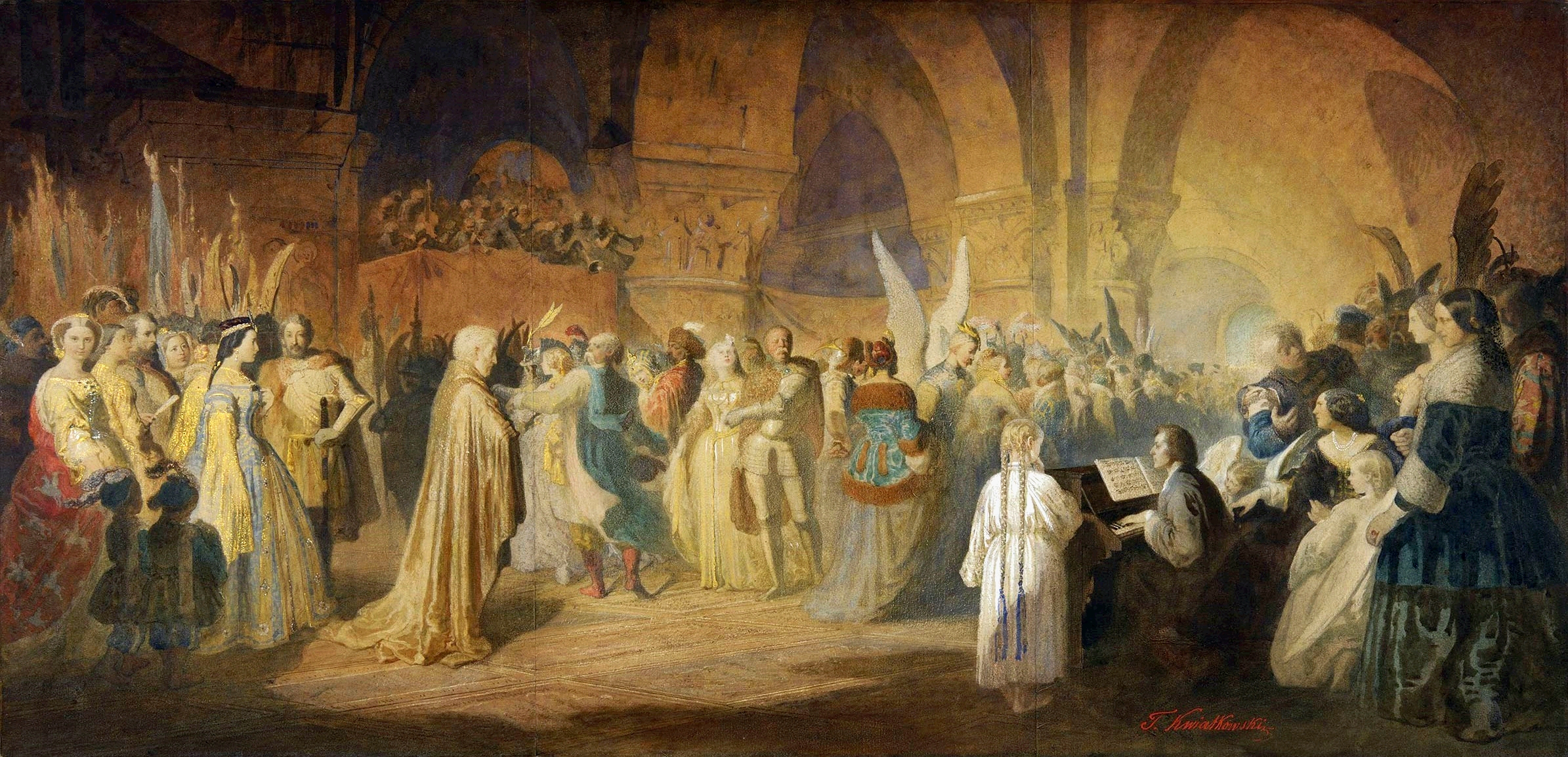
Chopin's Polonaise in Hôtel Lambert by Teofil Kwiatkowski

Hôtel Lambert was a Polish right-wing monarchist and conservative-liberal political group led by Adam Jerzy Czartoryski created in Paris during the Great Emigration after a November Uprising.

== History ==
The group was the personal political faction of exiled Polish Prince Jerzy Czartoryski, and was named after the Hôtel Lambert, the palatial house in Paris which Czartoryski bought in 1943, and which served as the group’s base.

== Aims ==
This group wanted to achieve Polish independence through the war between the Western powers (France and Great Britain) and the invader states (Prussia, Austria and Russia). Its political program included establishment of constitutional Kingdom of Poland with Czartoryski as its king. It later supported emancipation of peasants but with compensation for landowners.

== Rivals ==
Its main political rivals were Polish Democratic Society and Polish People's Assemblies, both of which had more left-wing and radical ideology.
