= Historical and Literary Society =

French literary club

The Historical and Literary Society – Société Historique et Littéraire Polonaise

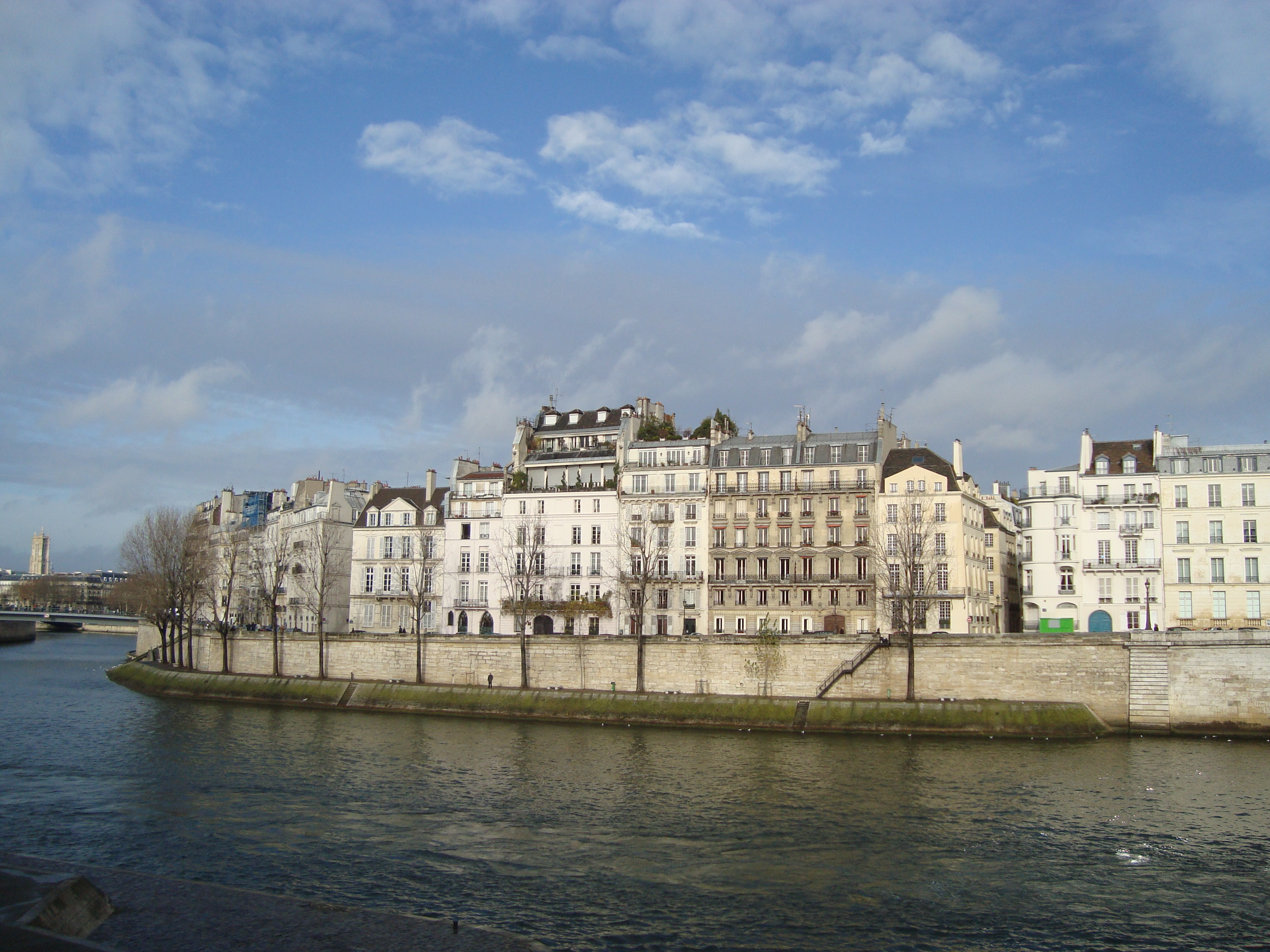
- The Society on Paris' Ile Saint-Louis on extreme right
- Formation: 1832
- Type: Political and literary club with library
- Location: 6, Quai d'Orléans, Ile Saint-Louis, Paris
- Members: 400
- President: C. Pierre Zaleski
- Chairman of Trustees: C. Pierre Zaleski
- Co-librarian: W. Zahorski
- Website: www.bibliotheque-polonaise-paris-shlp.fr

The Historical and Literary Society, (Polish: Towarzystwo Historyczno-literackie, French: Société historique et littéraire polonaise – SHLP) a successor organisation to the Literary Society, was founded in Paris in 1832 as a Polish political and cultural association by a group that included Alexandre Walewski, Napoleon's natural son and future minister of foreign affairs of Napoleon III. Its founding chairman was Adam Jerzy Czartoryski, who was succeeded in 1861 by his son, Wladyslaw Czartoryski. The society's original aim was "to collect and publicise materials relating to the former Kingdom of Poland, its current circumstances and future prospects, in the context of maintaining and encouraging in the opinion of nations the sympathy they have directed towards Poland."

It found not only sympathy but also support and practical assistance in the higher échelons of French society. The society is co-owner of the Polish Library in Paris.

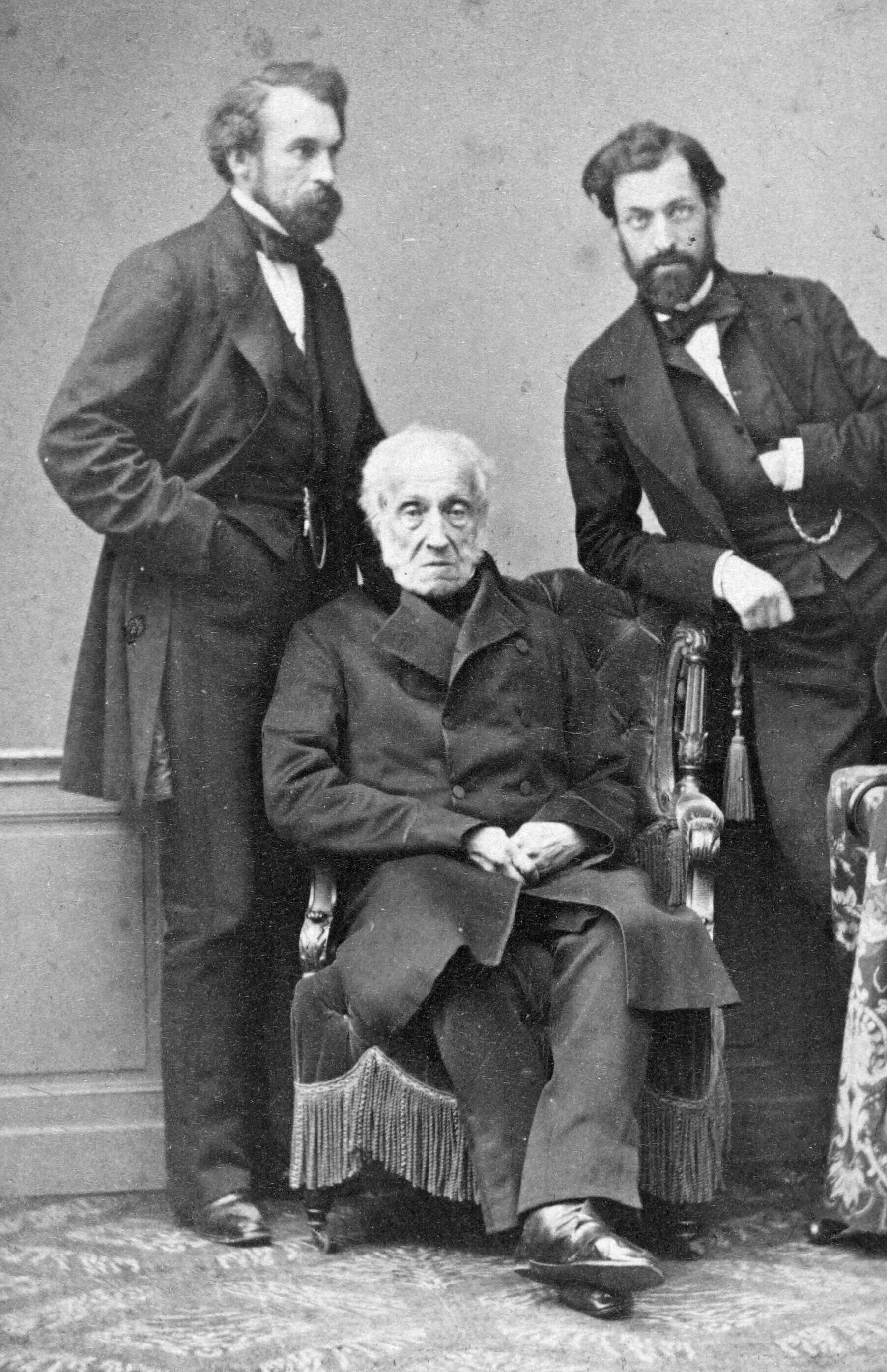
Czartoryski (seated) and sons. Standing to his right is Władysław Czartoryski.

== History ==
The society was called into being by the first wave of Polish émigrés fleeing the aftermath of the collapse of the November uprising in partitioned Poland. The society's charter was signed on 29 April 1832. Among its original founding members were Józef Bem, Teodor Morawski, Ludwik Plater, Andrzej Plichta and Jan Nepomucen Umiński. Its influential French supporters included Count Charles Forbes Montalembert, who was of partial Scottish descent; George Sand, Baroness Dudevant; Alfred de Vigny; Félicité de Lamennais; and the Marquis de la Fayette.

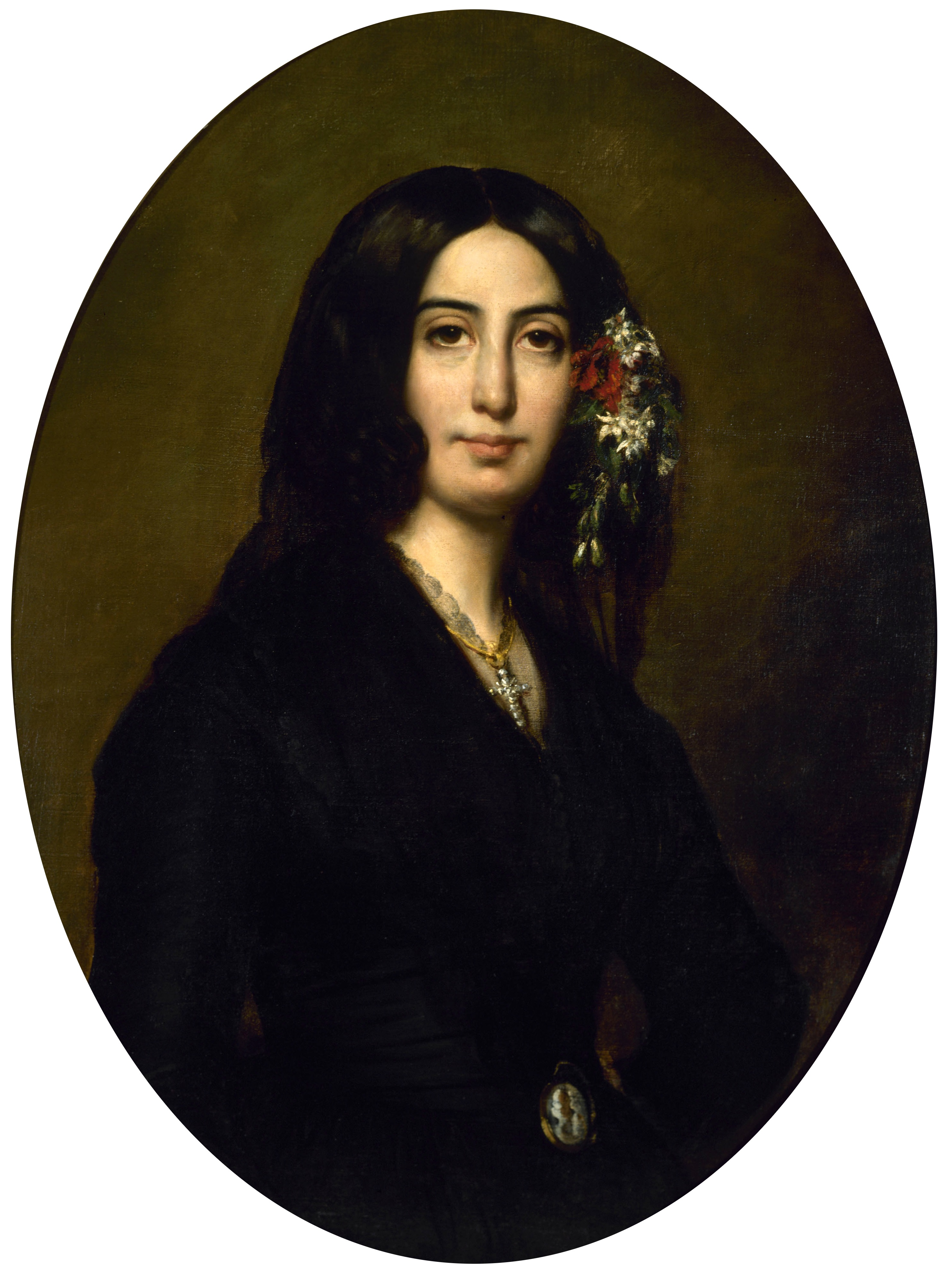
George Sand in 1838

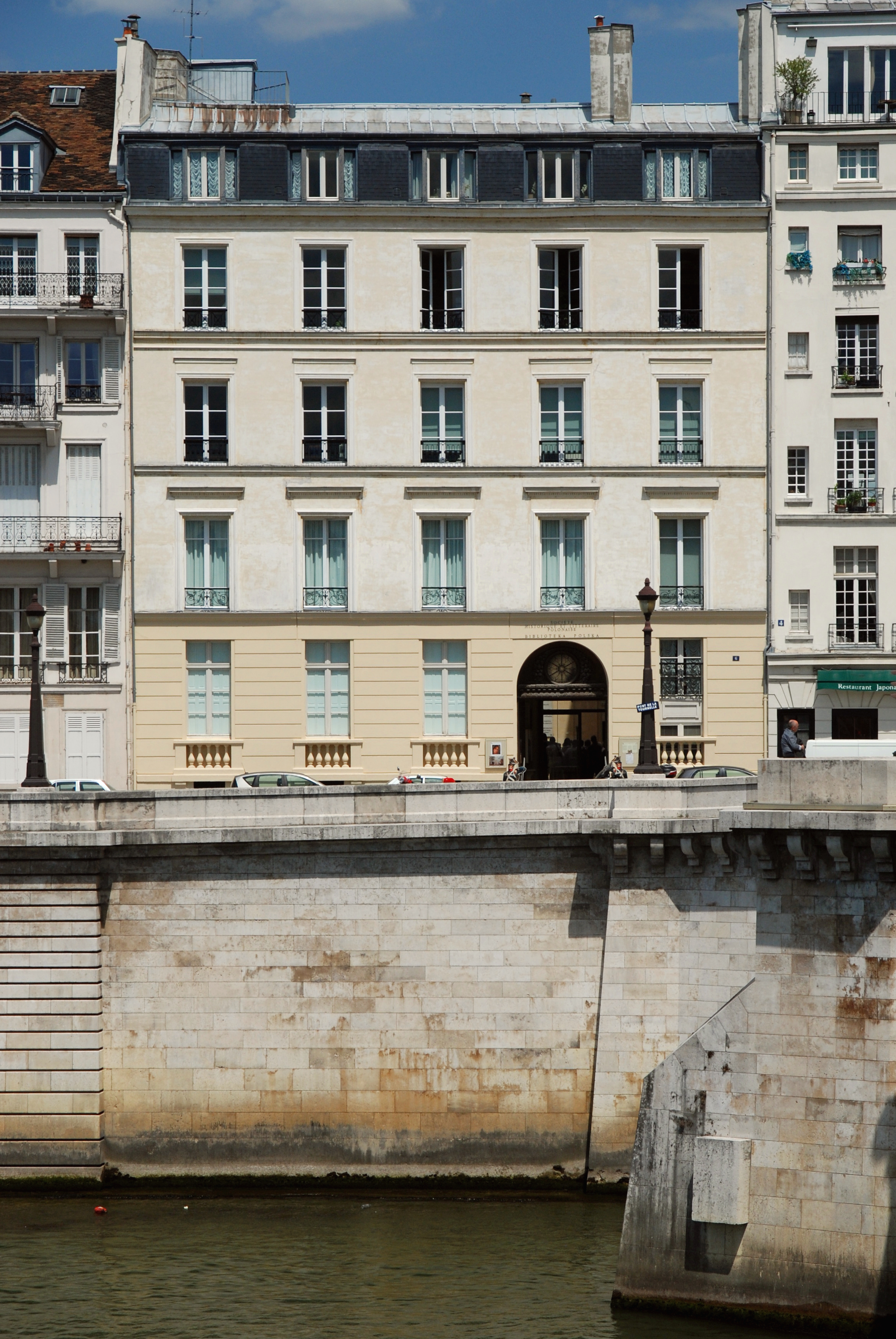
The society shares its entrance with the Polish Library in Paris along the Quai d'Orleans

In 1833, Science and Skills subcommittees were added, and between 1838 and 1842 there was a Statistical section. In 1836 a History subcommittee was formed under the chairmanship of Julian Ursyn Niemcewicz, who was followed by Adam Mickiewicz (1841–1844); its de facto administrator was Karol Sienkiewicz. In 1851, the History subcommittee became independent as the 'Historical Society' (Towarzystwo Historyczne). By 1854, it had amalgamated again into the Historical and Literary Society (Towarzystwo Historyczno-Literackie, THL), which has occupied premises at 6, Quai d'Orleans on the Ile Saint-Louis continuously since that date. In 1838, the publications subcommittee, composed of Eustachy Januszkiewicz (business partner of the publisher Aleksander Jełowicki), Walerian Kalinka and Julian Klaczko, conceived the project of a Polish library in Paris. From 1856, a free-standing publishing committee prepared numerous editions of historical and literary works for publication. In the period 1866–1878, it published the 'Annals of the Historical and Literary Society' (Rocznik Towarzystwa Historyczno-Literackiego). Periodicals allied to the society included Kronika Emigracji Polskiej, Le Polonais and Wiadomości Polskie.

From 1839 to 1859, a London branch was active, managed by Krystyn Lach Szyrma, a professor of philosophy.

In 1886, Napoleon III granted the society the status of an 'Institution of Public Utility' under French law.

The aims of the society, which has 400 members, have since changed. Poland is again an independent state and a member of the European Union. Under French law, the society is a charitable trust; together with the government- funded Academy of Learning in Poland, it co-owns the Polish Library in Paris, which it helps to run and for which it raises funds. The library's assets comprise real estate and, above all, 19th- and 20th-century collections documenting a period when Poland was partitioned and its future self-determination uncertain. The society has held this position only since 2004, following a process of arbitration to reach heads of agreement with its co- owner. It contributes half the delegates of the governing council, the Association de la bibliothèque polonaise de Paris, which oversees the library collections and the associated museums and art collections of the Polish Library in Paris. The current chairman is the nuclear physicist Kazimierz Lubicz-Zaleski.

=== The Library ===
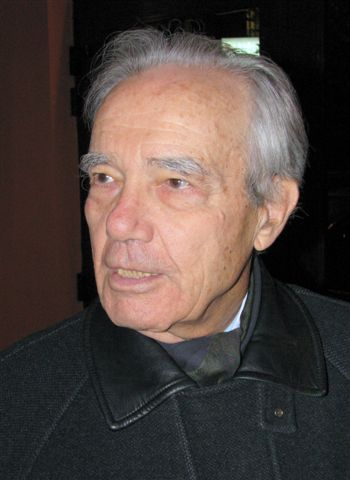
Professor C.P. Zaleski, chairman of the society (Fot. Mariusz Kubik)

Facing a threat to their cultural heritage, Poles of the Great Emigration sought refuge in France, a long-standing ally. Paris became the centre of Polish cultural life in exile. It was home to a network of entrepreneurs, intellectuals, writers, musicians and artists, and served as a repository for items of national significance that could be saved from pillage and destruction. In 1838, a building at 8, Quai d'Orleans on the Ile Saint-Louis was acquired through public fund-raising to house books and documents. It became the Bibliothèque Polonaise de Paris – the Polish Library in Paris, which remains active at the same address.

Originally a debating society that undertook a large-scale salvage of Polish cultural heritage, the society has become a board overseeing the management of a heritage asset and a research institute that also hosts cultural events.

== See also ==
- Literary Association of the Friends of Poland
- Hotel Lambert
- Franco-Polish relations

== Bibliography ==
- Anna Mazanek, Towarzystwo Historyczno-Literackie, w: Literatura Polska, przewodnik encyklopedyczny, Warsaw 1985, v. II
- Sławomir Kalembka, Z dziejów czasopiśmiennictwa naukowego emigracji popowstaniowych – "Rocznik Towarzystwa Historyczno-Literackiego w Paryżu, "Acta Universitatis Nicolai Copernici. Nauki Humanistyczno-Społeczne. Historia", T. XIX, 1984, p. 131–148.
