= Anglo Polish Society =

Association supporting Anglo-Polish relations

- Abbreviation: APS
- Formation: February 25, 1832; 194 years ago
- Founders: Thomas Campbell; Adolphus Bach
- Registration no.: 1121125
- Legal status: Charity
- Headquarters: Commonwealth House
- Location: Bristol, England
- Official language: English
- Website: anglopolishsociety.org
- Formerly called: Literary Association of the Friends of Poland

The Anglo Polish Society (APS) is a British organisation of solidarity with Poles, founded on February 25, 1832 in the United Kingdom, by the Scottish poet Thomas Campbell and German lawyer Adolphus Bach, as the Literary Association of the Friends of Poland. Although the creation of the organisation was the result of deep pro-Polish sympathies of Campbell and the whole contemporary British public opinion, Prince Adam Jerzy Czartoryski did attend a dinner for the association, in Edinburgh 1835 along with Count Zamoyski.

== History ==
Campbell was the Society's first President, and the first secretary was a young Anglo-Irishman, Richard Graves Meredith. The main goal of the society was to sustain the interest of British public opinion in the Polish question after the failure of the November Uprising. Its members included many influential British political figures, e.g. Sir Francis Burdett, Dudley Ryder, Robert Cutlar Fergusson, Lord Dudley Coutts Stuart, Thomas Wentworth Beaumont, Daniel O'Connell, Thomas Attwood and Patrick Stuart.

There were also a number of regional associations created in 1832 which supported the main association in London: these were: Hull Literary Polish Society (founded in July 1832), Glasgow Polish Association (founded in October 1832), and the Birmingham Polish Association (founded in October 1832).

Maude Ashurst Biggs and her mother were enthusiastic supporters in the 1880s. Biggs published English translations of Adam Mickiewicz's epic poetry. In 1882 she published her translation of Mickiewicz's epic poem Konrad Wallenrod which had somehow not been censored by the Russians and in 1885 she published her translation of another of his epic poems Master Thaddeus, or, The Last Foray in Lithuania to assist the cause.

== Sources ==
- Campbell, Thomas (1849). Beattie, William (ed.). Life and letters of Thomas Campbell. Vol. 3. E. Moxon. p. 101.
- "Literary association of the friends of Poland". Polonia (1–5). Charles Fox et al: 35, 320, 323, 413. August–December 1832.
- Tyler, Edward Royall, ed. (1851). "Art. VII.—Life and Writings of Campbell". New Englander and Yale Review. New Series–Volume 3. 9. et al (eds). New York: W.L. Benedict: 261–289.

== See also ==
- Historical and Literary Society
- Polish Library in Paris
