= Union of National Unity =

Secret Polish organization

Związek Jedności Narodowej (English: Union/Association of National Unity) was a secret organization formed by followers of Prince Adam Jerzy Czartoryski. A liberal-aristocratic fraction of the Polish Great Emigration, come into being on January 21, 1833.

The association directed in emigration science, literature, pedagogic and charity organisations in partitioned Poland. In 1837 the association was transformed into the "Insurrectionary-Monarchist Society" (Związek Insurekcyjno-Monarchiczny Wyjarzmicieli).

Main activists:

- Adam Jerzy Czartoryski (leader)
- Stanisław Barzykowski
- Henryk Dembiński
- Karol Kniaziewicz
- Narcyz Olizar

== See also ==
- Hotel Lambert
