= Władysław Stanisław Zamoyski =

Polish general, nobleman, and politician (1803–1868)

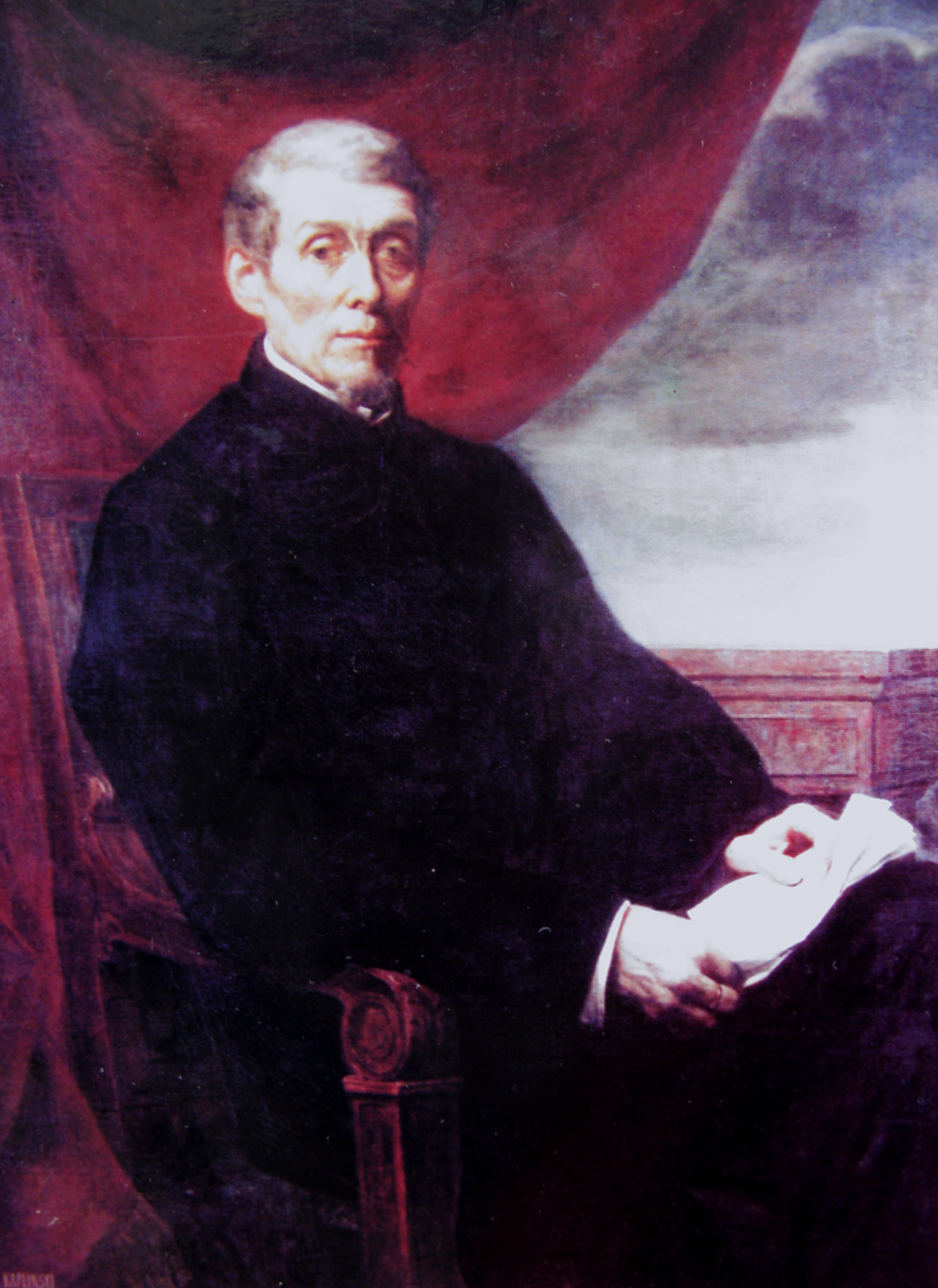
- Portrait of Zamoyski by Leon Kapliński
- Coat of arms: Jelita
- Born: 24 March 1803; Warsaw, New East Prussia, Kingdom of Prussia
- Died: 11 January 1868 (aged 64); Paris, Second French Empire
- Buried: Cimetière des Champeaux de Montmorency
- Noble family: Zamoyski
- Consort: Jadwiga Działyńska
- Father: Stanisław Kostka Zamoyski
- Mother: Zofia Czartoryska

Count Władysław Stanisław Zamoyski (24 March 1803 – 11 January 1868) was a Polish nobleman (szlachcic), politician, and general.

Zamoyski was the owner of estates in Cewków. He served as aide-de-camp to Grand Duke Constantine, commander-in-chief of the army and de facto viceroy of Congress Poland. He took part in the November Uprising of 1830–1831. Working with Adam Jerzy Czartoryski he became one of the main activists in the Hôtel Lambert group. He emigrated to England, where he represented the interests of Czartoryski's government-in-exile. In 1848–1849 he organized Polish units in Italy, serving with the Sardinian Army to fight against the Austrians (1848–49), and later, in 1855, he led a Polish cavalry division in the Ottoman Army during the Crimean War.

In March 1831, Zamoyski was awarded the Gold Cross of the Virtuti Militari.

He was married to Jadwiga Działyńska and had four children: Władysław Zamoyski, Witold Zamoyski, Maria Zamoyska (1857-1857) and Maria Zamoyska (1860-1937).

He died in 1868 and was buried in Paris.
