= Henryk Rodakowski =

Polish painter

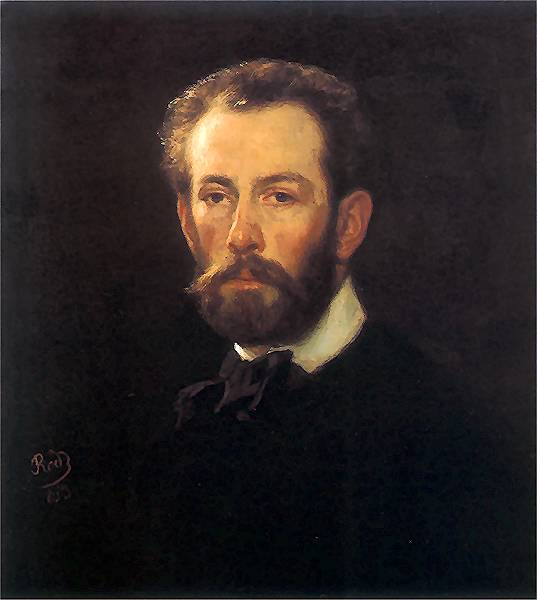
- Self-portrait, 1853, National Museum in Wrocław
- Born: July 9, 1823; Lwów, Austrian Empire (today Lviv)
- Died: December 28, 1894 (aged 71); Kraków, Galicia
- Known for: Painting

Henryk Hipolit Rodakowski (Polish: [ˈxɛnrɨk rɔdaˈkɔfski]; 1823–1894) was a Polish painter.

== Biography ==
He came from a well-known family of lawyers. Continuing the family tradition between 1841 and 1845, he studied law in Vienna. Later he studied painting under Joseph Danhauser (1805–1845) and Franz Eybl (1806–1880). In the years 1846 to 1867 he lived in Paris, where he continued his studies with Léon Cogniet. In 1852 he experienced his first major success by painting a portrait of General Henryk Dembiński, which won the first prize. His studio was visited by the famous painter Eugène Delacroix.

In 1861 he married the love of his youth, Kamila Blühdorn, née von Salzgeber, with whom he had two children. His great-grandson was Jacek Woźniakowski (1920–2012), art historian, writer and co-founder of publishing house "Znak".

In 1866 he was a member of the Polish Historical and Literary Society in Paris. A year later, he left Paris and returned to Poland. He lived in Pałahicze near Stanisławów. At the end of his life he settled in Kraków.

In 1893 he became director and president of the Society of Friends of Fine Arts and chairman of the Committee of the National Museum. On December 24, 1894, he was nominated for the director of Kraków Academy of Fine Arts, but died unexpectedly four days later. He was buried in Rakowice Cemetery in Kraków.

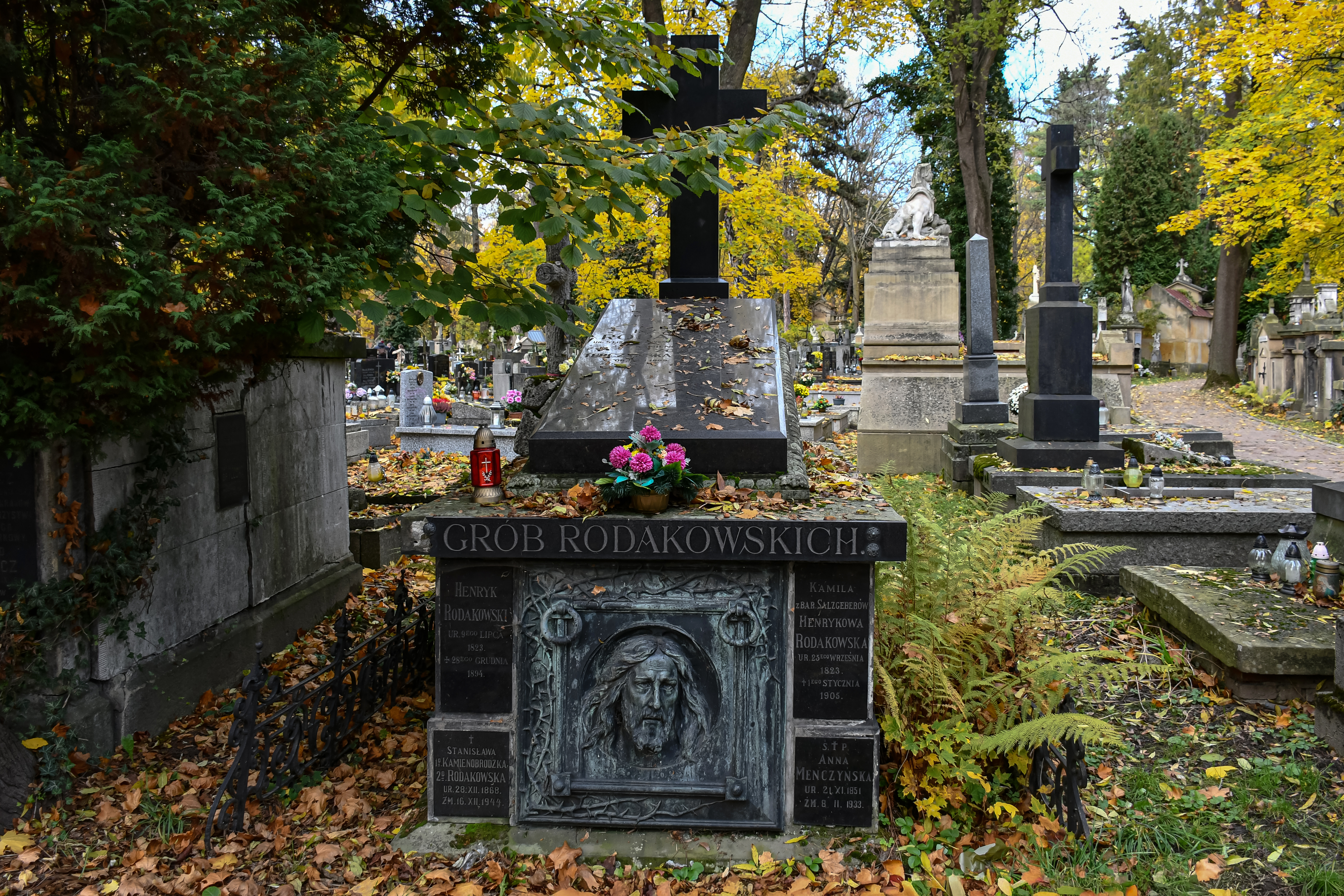
Tomb of Henryk Rodakowski Rakowicki Cemetery, 26 Rakowicka Street, Kraków

He was a recipient of the Legion of Honour.

He was befriended by the painter and activist Leon Kaplinski.

== Paintings ==
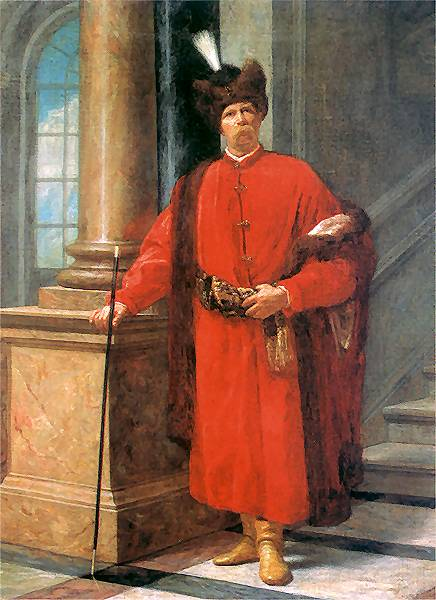
Marshal, 1859

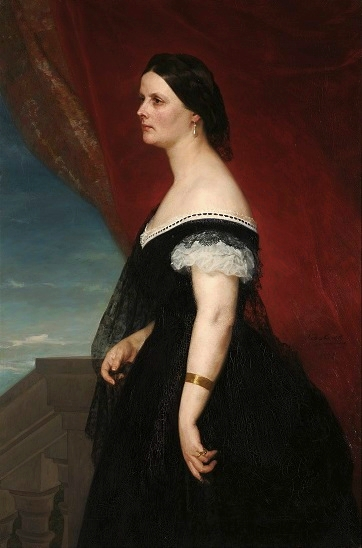
Portrait of artist's wife, 1865

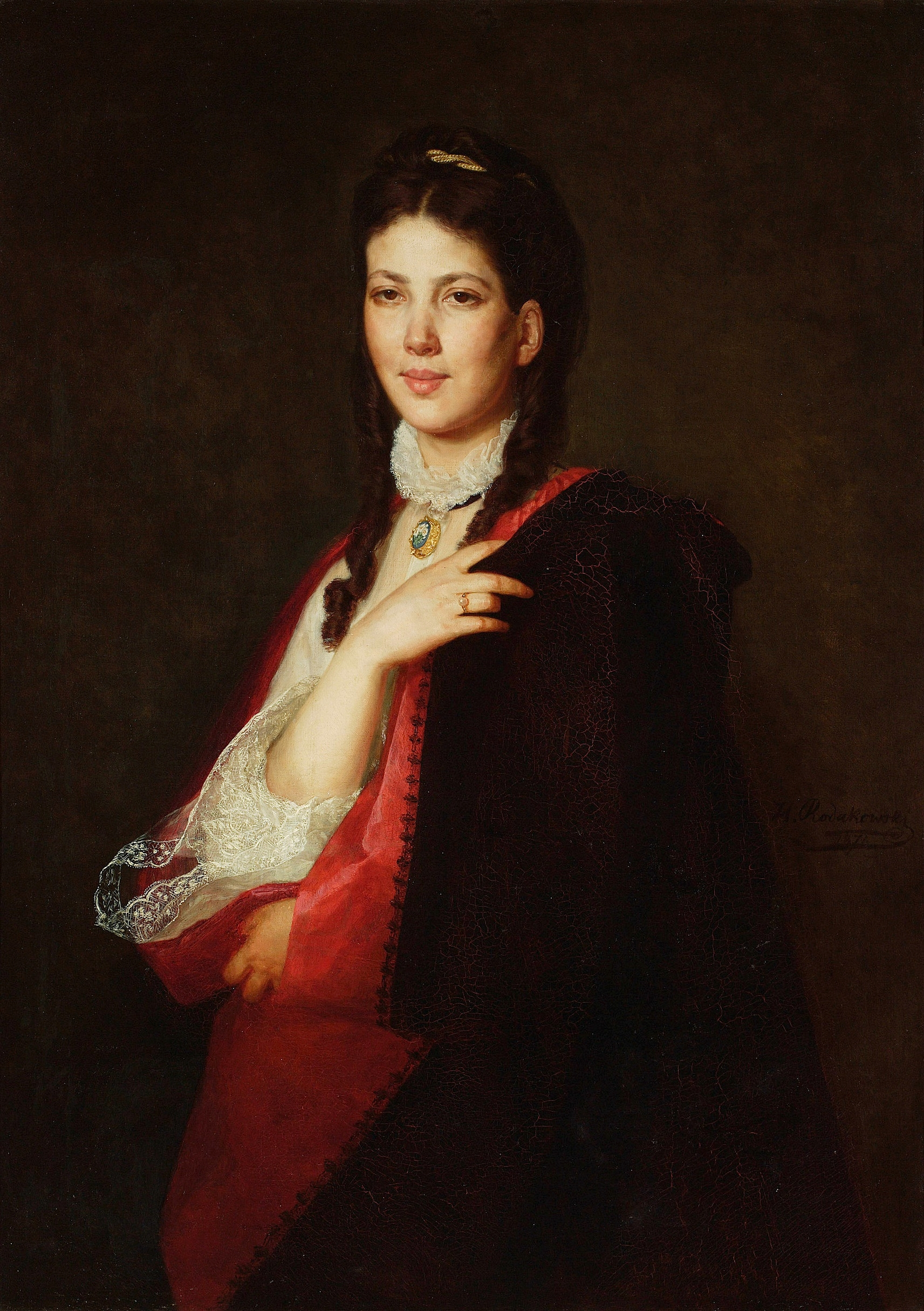
Leonia Blühdorn, 1871

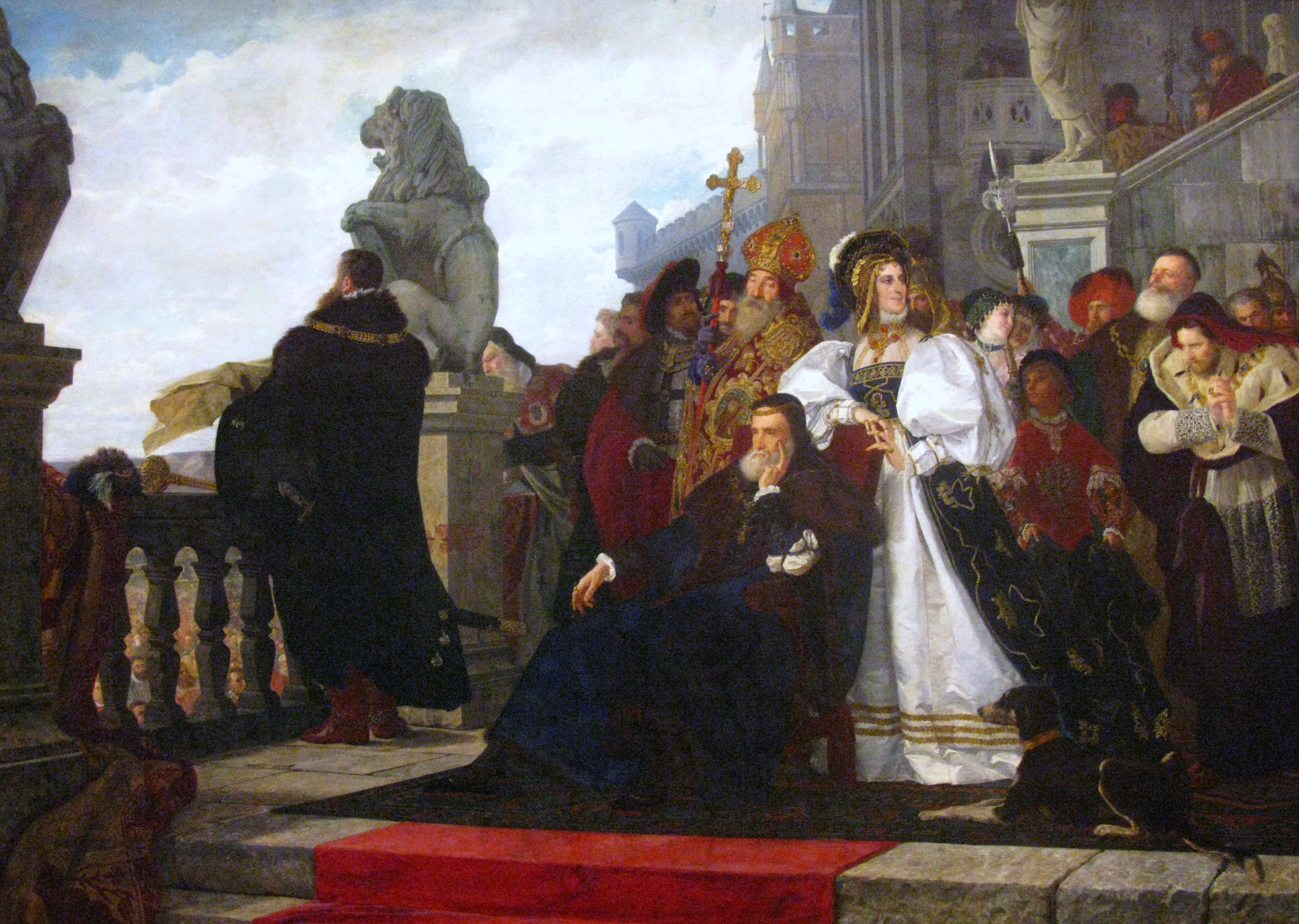
Chicken War, 1872

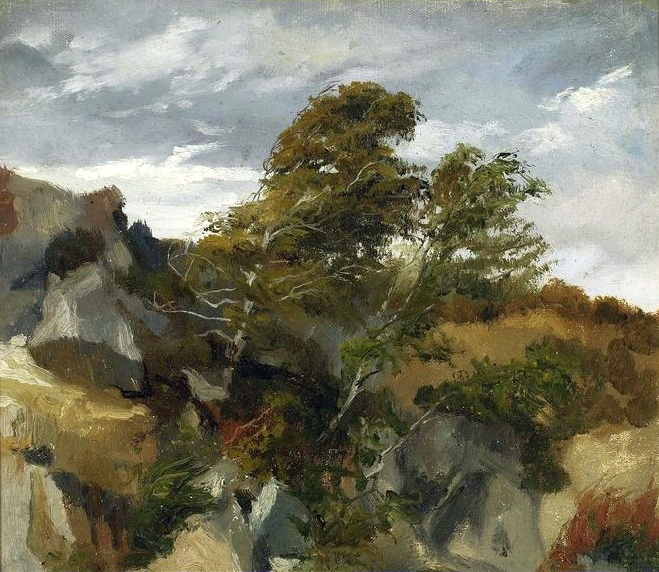
Landscape from Bortniki upon Dniester, 1878

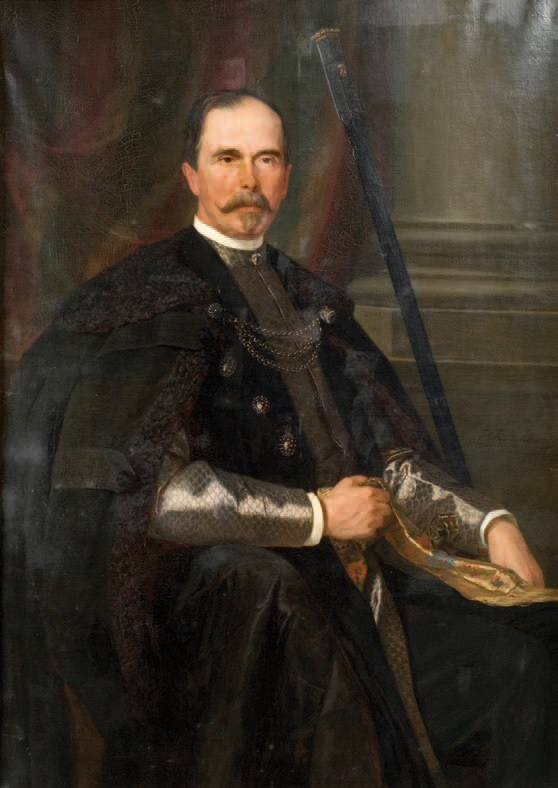
Jan Dzierżysław Tarnowski, 1889
