= Hôtel Lambert =

Mansion on Île Saint-Louis, Paris from the 1640s

Coordinates: 48°51′03″N 2°21′34″E

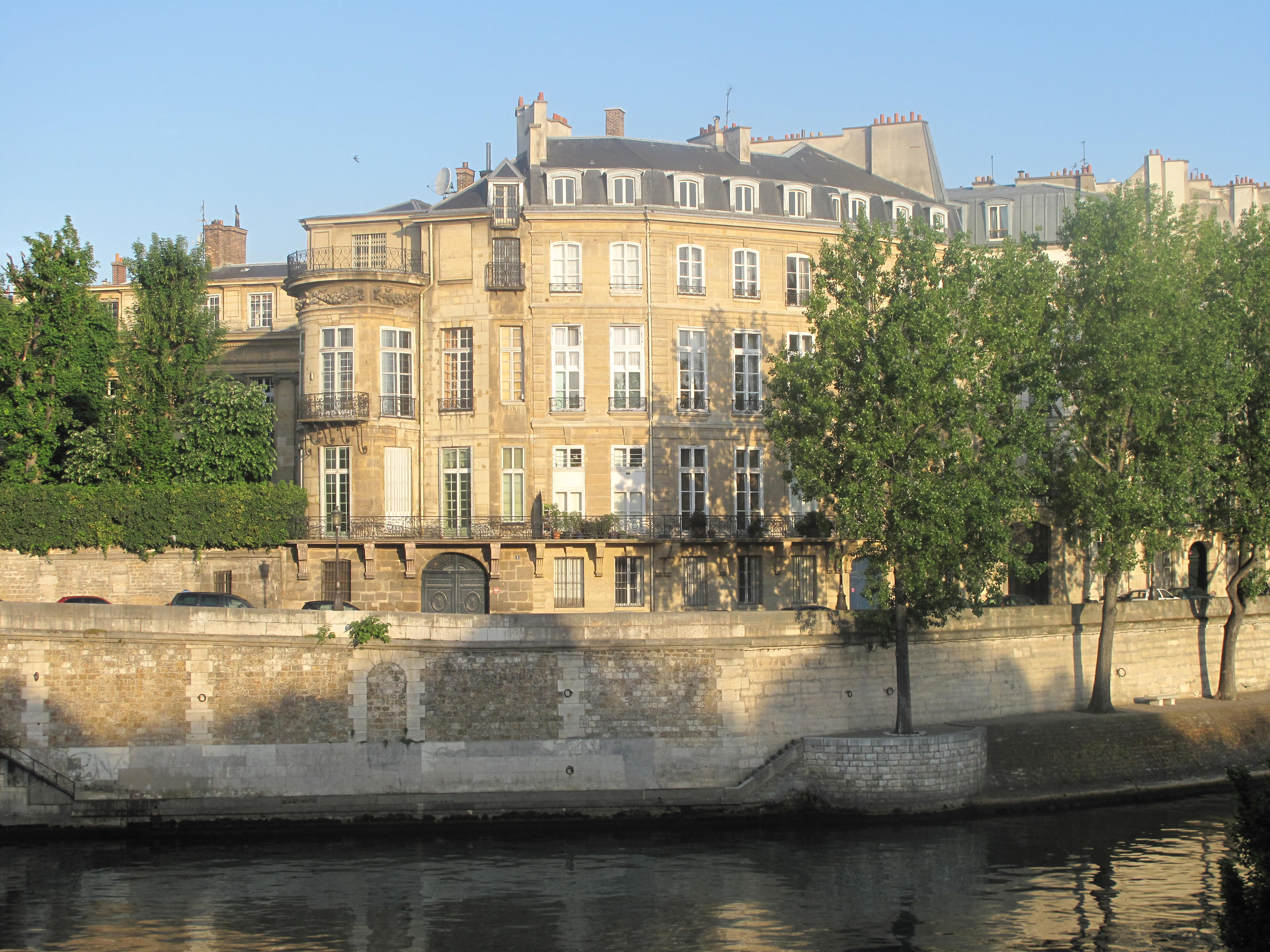
Hôtel Lambert in 2010

The Hôtel Lambert (French: [otɛl lɑ̃bɛːʁ]) is an hôtel particulier, a grand mansion townhouse, built between 1640 and 1644 on the Quai Anjou on the eastern tip of the Île Saint-Louis, in the 4th arrondissement of Paris. In the 19th century, the name Hôtel Lambert also came to designate a political faction of Polish exiles associated with Prince Adam Jerzy Czartoryski, who had purchased the Hôtel Lambert.

== Architectural history ==
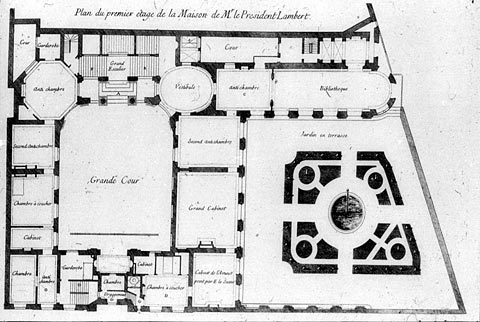
Floor plan of Louis Le Vau's Hôtel Lambert

The house, on an irregular site at the tip of the Île Saint-Louis in the heart of Paris, was designed by architect Louis Le Vau. It was built between 1640 and 1644, originally for the financier Jean-Baptiste Lambert (d. 1644) and continued by his younger brother Nicolas Lambert, later president of the Chambre des Comptes. For Nicolas Lambert, the interiors were decorated by Charles Le Brun, François Perrier, and Eustache Le Sueur, producing one of the finest, most-innovative, and iconographically coherent examples of mid-17th-century domestic architecture and decorative painting in France.

The entrance gives onto the central square courtyard, around which the hôtel was built. A wing extends to the right at the rear, embracing a walled garden. At the same time, Louis Le Vau constructed a residence for himself adjacent to the Hôtel Lambert. He lived there between 1642 and 1650. It was where all of his children were born and his mother died. After the architect's own death in 1670, his hôtel was bought by the La Haye family, who owned the other residence as well. Both buildings were then joined and their façades combined.

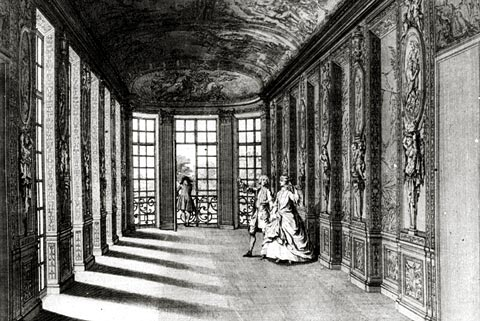
The Galerie d'Hercule, decorated by Charles Le Brun.

Both painters worked on the internal decoration for almost five years, producing the gallant allegories of Le Brun's grand Galerie d'Hercule (still in situ, but heavily damaged in the 2013 fire described below) and the small Cabinet des Muses, with five canvases by Le Sueur that were purchased for the royal collection (now in the Louvre) and the earlier ensemble, the Cabinet de l'Amour, which in its original configuration featured an alcove for a canopied bed upon which the lady of the house would receive visitors, according to the custom of the day. Significantly the alcove was eliminated about 1703. All the ensembles featured themes of love and marriage. However, the paintings have since been dispersed.

In the 1740s, the Marquise du Châtelet and Voltaire, her lover, used the Hôtel Lambert as their Paris residence when not at her country estate in Cirey. The marquise was famed for her salon there. Later, the Marquis du Châtelet sold the Lambert to Claude Dupin and his wife Louise-Marie Dupin, who continued the tradition of the salon. The Dupins were ancestors of writer George Sand, who, because of her relationship with the Polish composer Chopin, was also a frequent guest of the 19th-century Polish owners of the property.

== A political salon ==
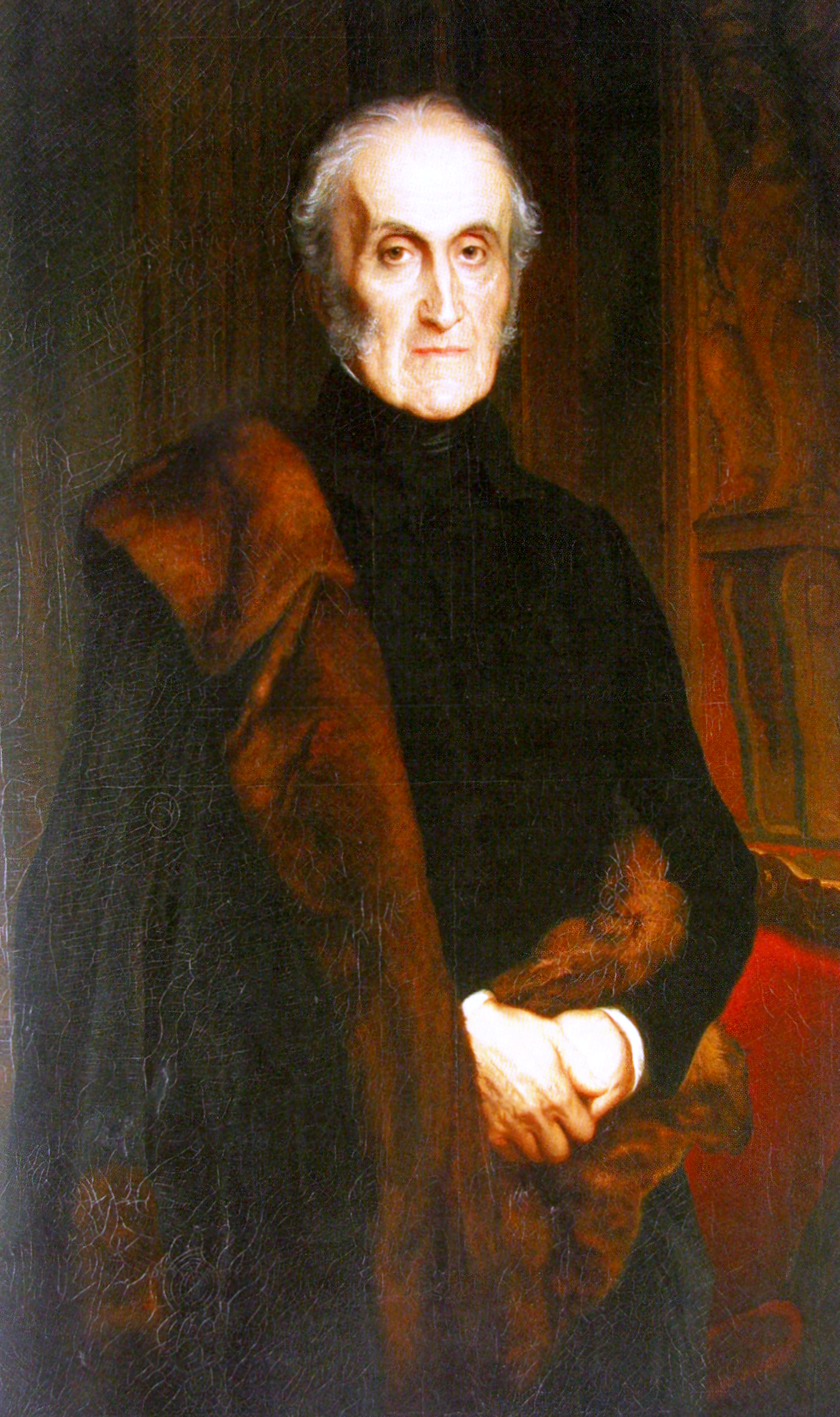
Prince Adam Jerzy Czartoryski

In 1843, the hôtel particulier was bought by Prince Adam Jerzy Czartoryski, member of the powerful family of Polish magnates. He and his brother, Konstanty Adam, were leaders of the liberal aristocratic faction of the Great Emigration from Poland, following the collapse of the November Uprising of 1830–1831. A political group formed around Adam Czartoryski, and his palatial residence in central Paris, surrounded by the natural 'moat' of the river Seine, lent its name to his political faction.

The political beliefs of the Hôtel Lambert faction were derived from the 3 May Constitution, which its members had supported. The Hôtel Lambert played an important role in keeping the "Polish question" alive in European politics, by continually keeping the Polish cause on the agenda. It also served as a safe harbour for Polish emigés and royalists, exiled from their country after the unsuccessful uprising against Russia. Among other notable politicians who took part in the Hôtel Lambert's activities were Władysław Czartoryski, son of Adam, Józef Bem, Henryk Dembiński, Karol Kniaziewicz, Julian Ursyn Niemcewicz, Władysław Stanisław Zamoyski, Władysław Ostrowski and Leon Kaplinski.

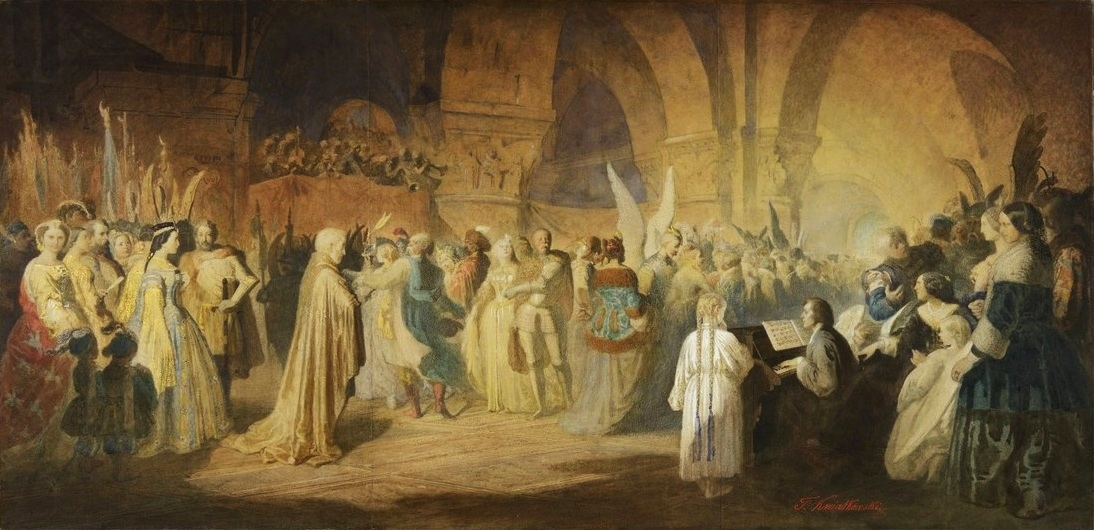
"Chopin's Polonaise – Ball at Hôtel Lambert in Paris," by Teofil Kwiatkowski. Chopin plays while Czartoryski (left) listens. Decorative vaulting was temporary.

Initially a political think tank and a discussion club, the political faction also worked on the preservation and promotion of Polish culture. An Historical and Literary Society began in 1832 and the idea of a Polish library, which exists to this day just along the Quai d'Orleans nearby, was conceived in the Hôtel Lambert in 1838. Plans laid for two schools teaching Polish (one for girls, one for boys) and were established in Batignolles. There was support for numerous commercial enterprises, especially in the fields of publication and printing. Over time, it became one of the most important hubs of Polish culture in the world, especially after the January Uprising, when Polish language and culture became heavily persecuted during the enforced Russification in the Russian Partition of Poland itself.

The Hôtel Lambert drew politicians and artists, including Alexandre Walewski, Charles Forbes René de Montalembert, Frédéric Chopin, Zygmunt Krasiński, Alphonse de Lamartine, George Sand, Honoré de Balzac, Hector Berlioz, Franz Liszt, Eugène Delacroix, and Adam Mickiewicz. Chopin's "La Polonaise" was composed expressly for the Polish ball held there every year.

== 20th and 21st centuries ==
The Hôtel Lambert was discreetly split into several luxurious apartments. It was once the home of actress Michèle Morgan, Mona von Bismarck, and of Alexis von Rosenberg, Baron de Redé, who rented the ground floor from 1947 until his death. (Note: The restorations undertaken at the Hôtel Lambert were discussed by J. Dupont.) De Redé entertained his lover Arturo Lopez-Willshaw (1900–1962), who continued to maintain a formal residence with wife Patricia in Neuilly. Redé and Lopez-Willshaw's dinner parties and balls were at the center of le tout Paris. In 1969 de Redé staged his most famous ball, the Bal Oriental, with guests such as Jacqueline de Ribes, Guy de Rothschild, Salvador Dalí, Brigitte Bardot, Dolores Guinness, and Margrethe II of Denmark.

In 1975, the Czartoryski heirs sold the Hôtel Lambert to Baron Guy de Rothschild, whose wife, Marie-Hélène de Rothschild, was a close friend of de Redé; they used it as their Paris residence.

In September 2007, the Hôtel Lambert was sold by the Rothschilds to Prince Abdullah bin Khalifa al-Thani, brother of the Emir of Qatar for the purported sum of 80 million euros ($111 million). A UNESCO World Heritage-listed building, it was in need of restoration, as parts of its wooden structure were rotting, staircases were sagging, and paint was cracked and discoloured.

The Prince's plan for a comprehensive overhaul of the building sparked controversy and became the subject of legal action brought by French conservationists. The scheme included plans to install air-conditioning, elevators, an underground car park with an exit through the notable curved garden wall, and a number of security measures. This involved digging under the garden and raising the 17th-century garden wall 80 cm. One heritage architect claimed the plans had "the aesthetics of a James Bond villa". Former tenant Michèle Morgan suggested that super-rich clients wanting a tailor-made luxury modern residence should consider a larger site on the outskirts of Paris rather than a cramped position limited on all sides by the river Seine and listed monuments. However, Alain-Charles Perrot, the architect in charge of the project, suggested that there was an element of racism in the objections. (Note: Incidentally, another mansion by Le Vau, the Hôtel de Hesselin, dating from 1642, was demolished in 1934 by its wealthy American owner, Helena Rubinstein, and replaced with a luxury block.)

After several years of wrangling, a truce was overseen by the Ministry of Culture and Paris City Hall, and the renovation was given the go-ahead under the supervision of Bâtiments de France, which safeguards historic monuments. Work began in 2010.

On 10 July 2013 a portion of the building was severely damaged by a fire which started in the roof during renovation work. The Cabinet des Bains with a series of ceiling frescoes by Eustache Le Sueur was completely destroyed, and another series of frescoes by Charles Le Brun in the Gallery of Hercules was heavily damaged by smoke and water. The restoration and renovation took a further three years.

Fire damage of July 2013

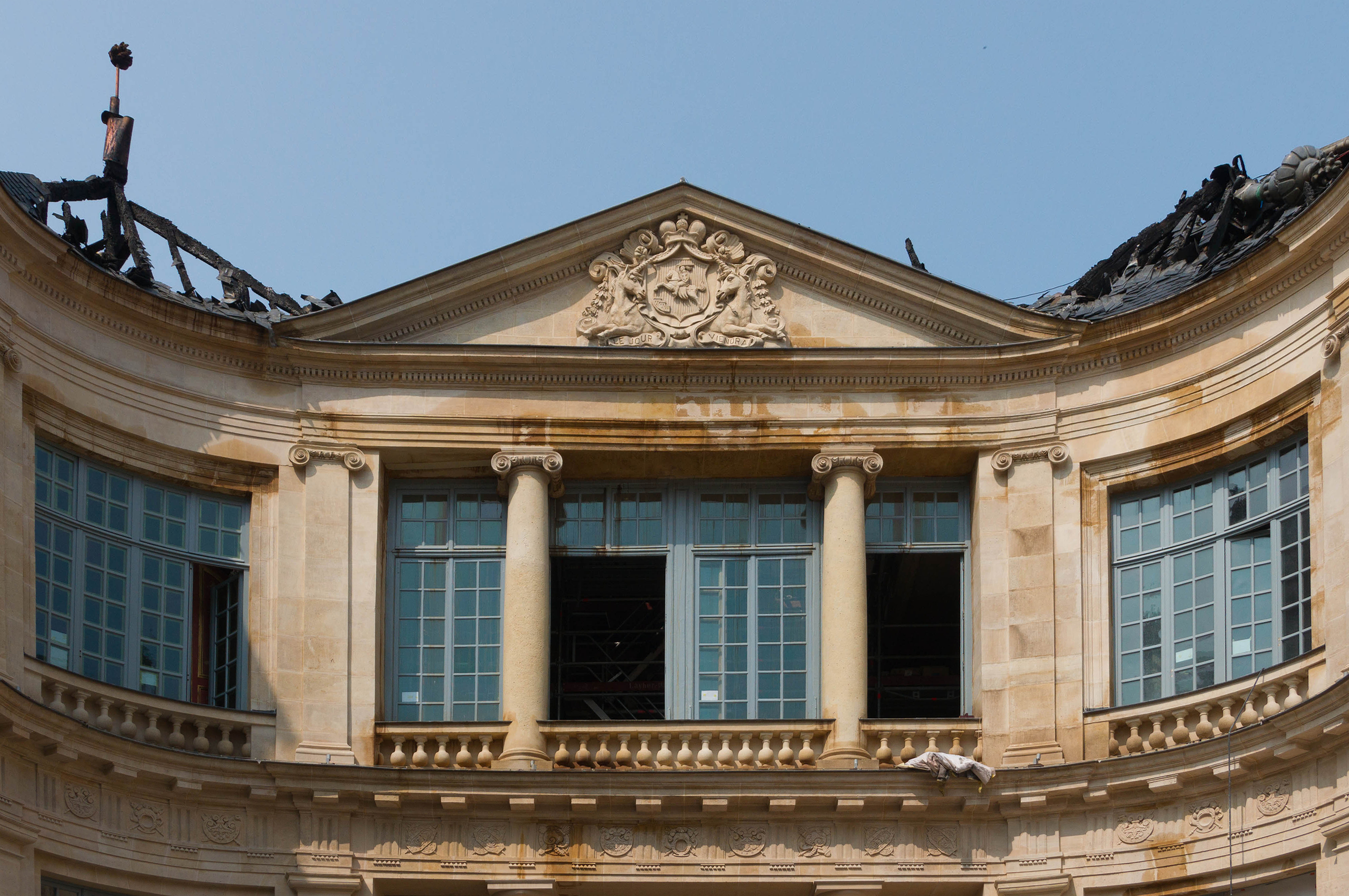
Upper court facade and roof

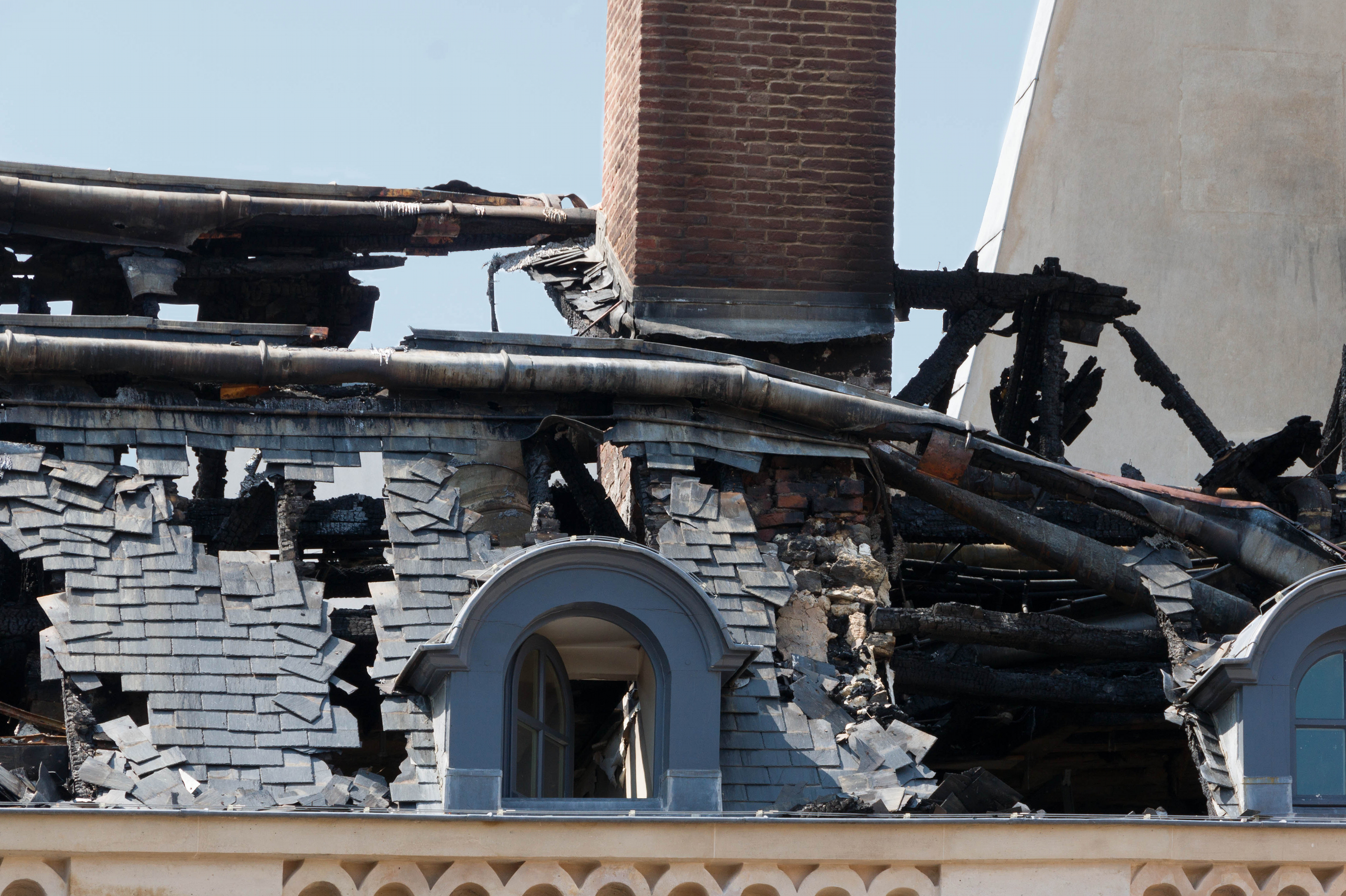
A portion of the damaged roof on the east side of the court

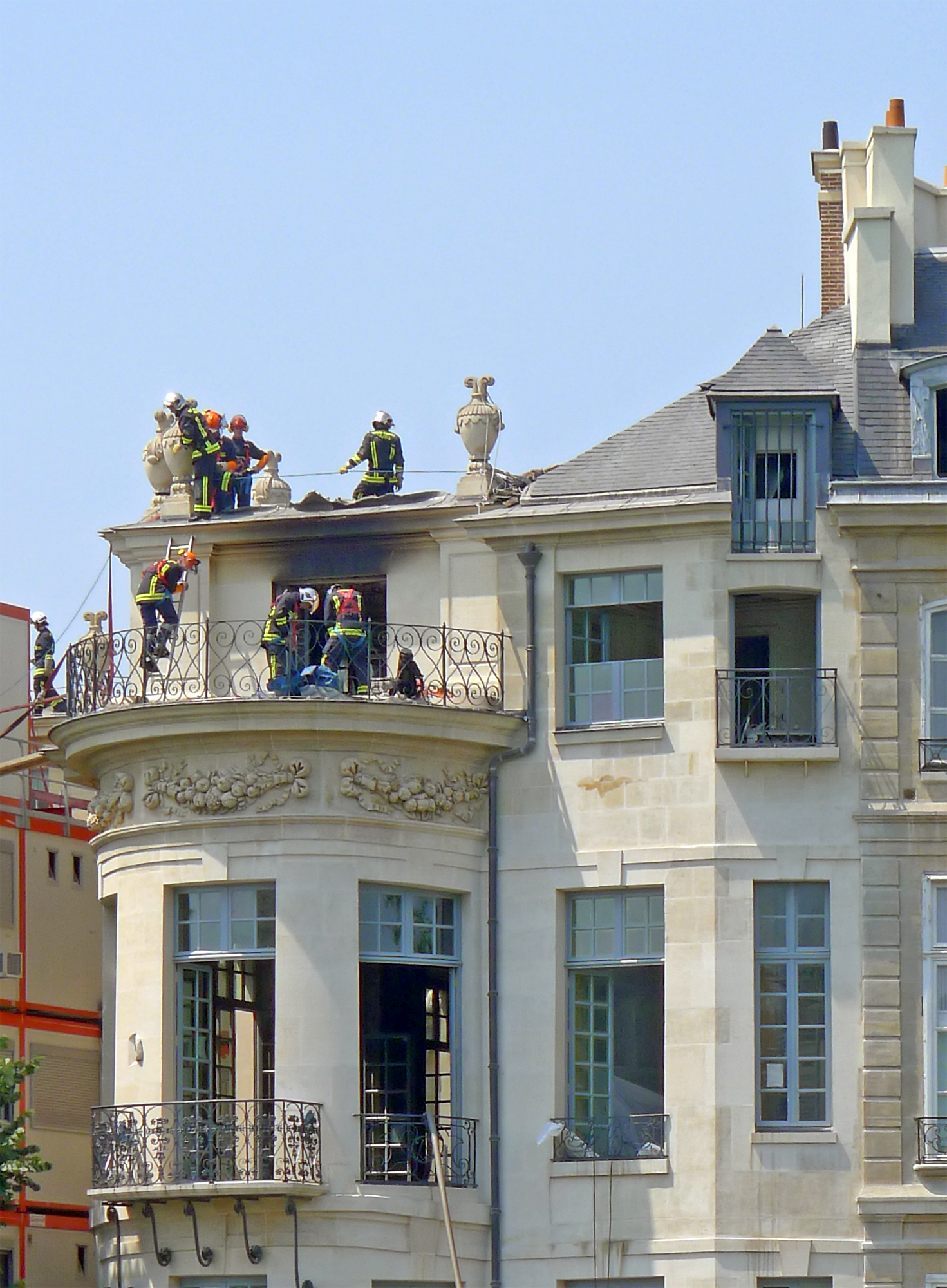
East end of the Gallery of Hercules and the floor above

The restoration by Al Thani eventually cost €120m (£100m); the restored house showcasing a collection of French art and decorative works of the highest quality. These were sent to auction in a series of sales in 2022.

In 2022, the house was sold to French telecom billionaire and art collector Xavier Niel for more than €200 million ($226 million) to be reportedly used as the headquarters for Niel's cultural foundation.

== See also ==
- Alexis von Rosenberg, Baron de Redé
- Great Emigration (Wielka Emigracja)
- Union of National Unity (Związek Jedności Narodowej)
- Rothschild family
