= Leon Kapliński =

Polish painter and political activist

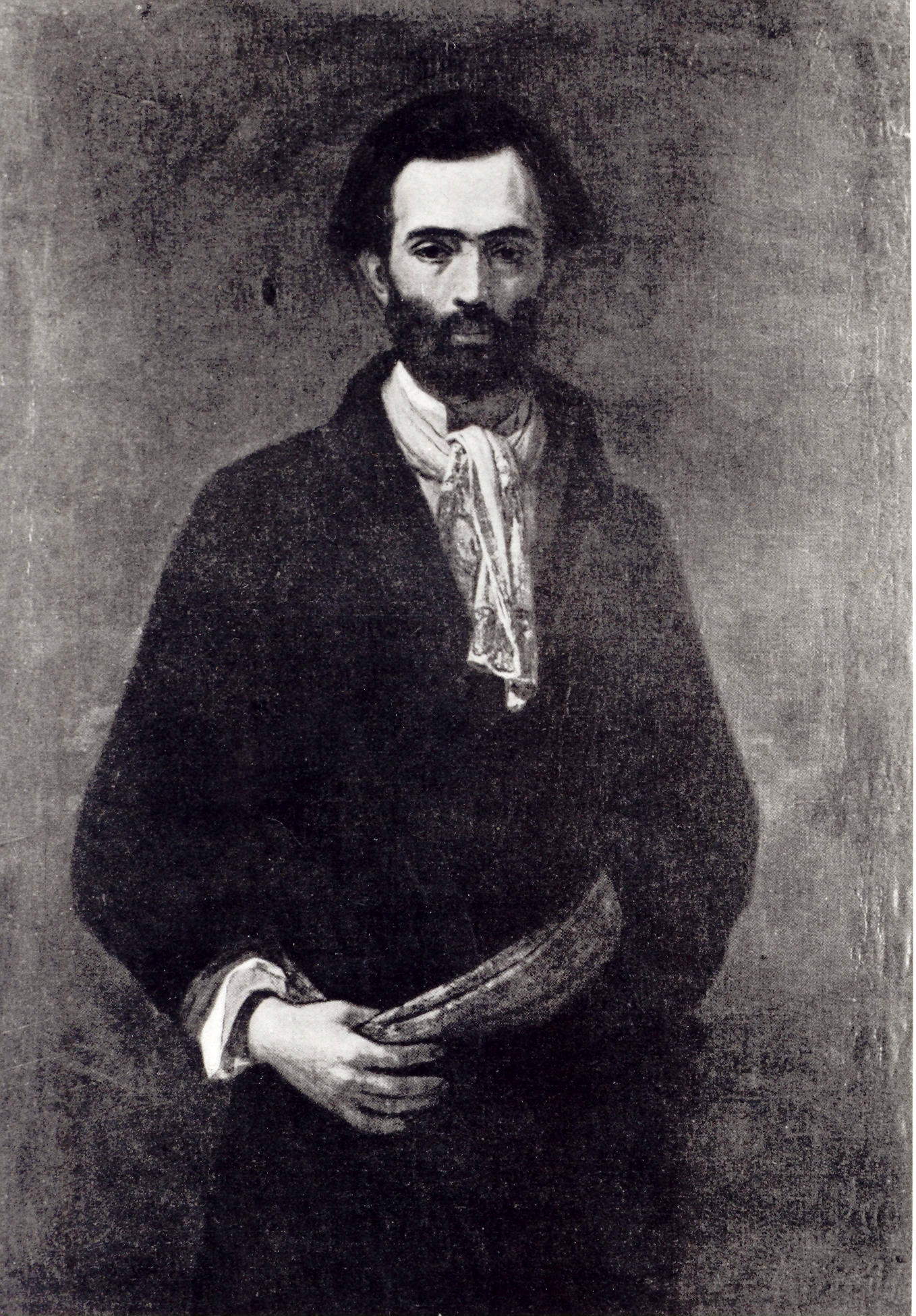
Portrait of Leon Kapliński by Henryk Rodakowski

Leon Henryk Kapliński (1826–1873) was a Polish painter and political activist.

== Biography ==
Born 1826 in Petrykozy not far from Warsaw, Leon was the son of Julia (Grabowska) and a small landowner and eminent freemason, Jan Kapliński. The Kaplińskis were a Frankist family; his grandfather Eliasz Adam Kapliński was one of the last known Frankists. Leon Kapliński studied law and philosophy in Warsaw and Wrocław (Breslau). He was engaged in revolutionary underground groups, fled from the part of Poland under Russian rule, was briefly held and interrogated by the Prussian police, and took part in the revolutionary movement in 1848. In the same year, Kapliński emigrated to Paris where he spent most of his remaining years. He took part in Polish émigré political activities, closely connected with the circle of Hotel Lambert and the Czartoryski family, accompanied the Count Witold Czartoryski during his trip to the Balkans and the Near East. Kapliński also edited the periodical Ephémérides Polonaises. He was married to Helena Michalina Hryniewiecka. In 1871 he moved back to Poland, living mostly in Kraków, and died in 1873 in Milosław. He befriended several well-known Polish artists and writers, including Henryk Rodakowski, Jan Matejka, and Cyprian Kamil Norwid.

Kapliński studied art in Poland and later in Paris. His first known works are copies of paintings by famous Italian artists; later he became known and appreciated for his patriotic historical paintings as Wernyhora (1855). His best works are portraits: of his mother Julia (1860), the writer Bohdan Zaleski (1857), Count Adam Jerzy Czartoryski (about 1860), and an autoportrait as a Templar (about 1872). Many of his paintings and other works have perished or been lost. Mainly influenced by classical Italian art and his contemporary Rodakowski, L.K. continued the tradition of academic painting and had no interest for the emerging modernist tendencies of the mid-nineteenth century. He won some recognition in France, participating in the Paris art salons. L.K. wrote some poems and a short novel Nad Wisłą (On Wisla).

His great-nephew was Estonian poet, philosopher, and culture critic Jaan Kaplinski.

== Selected paintings ==
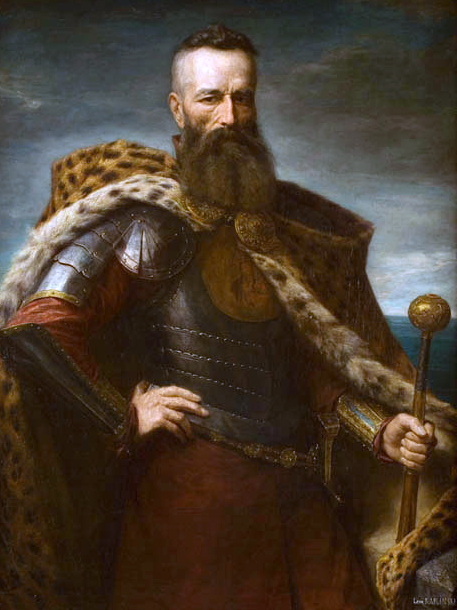
Stefan Czarniecki

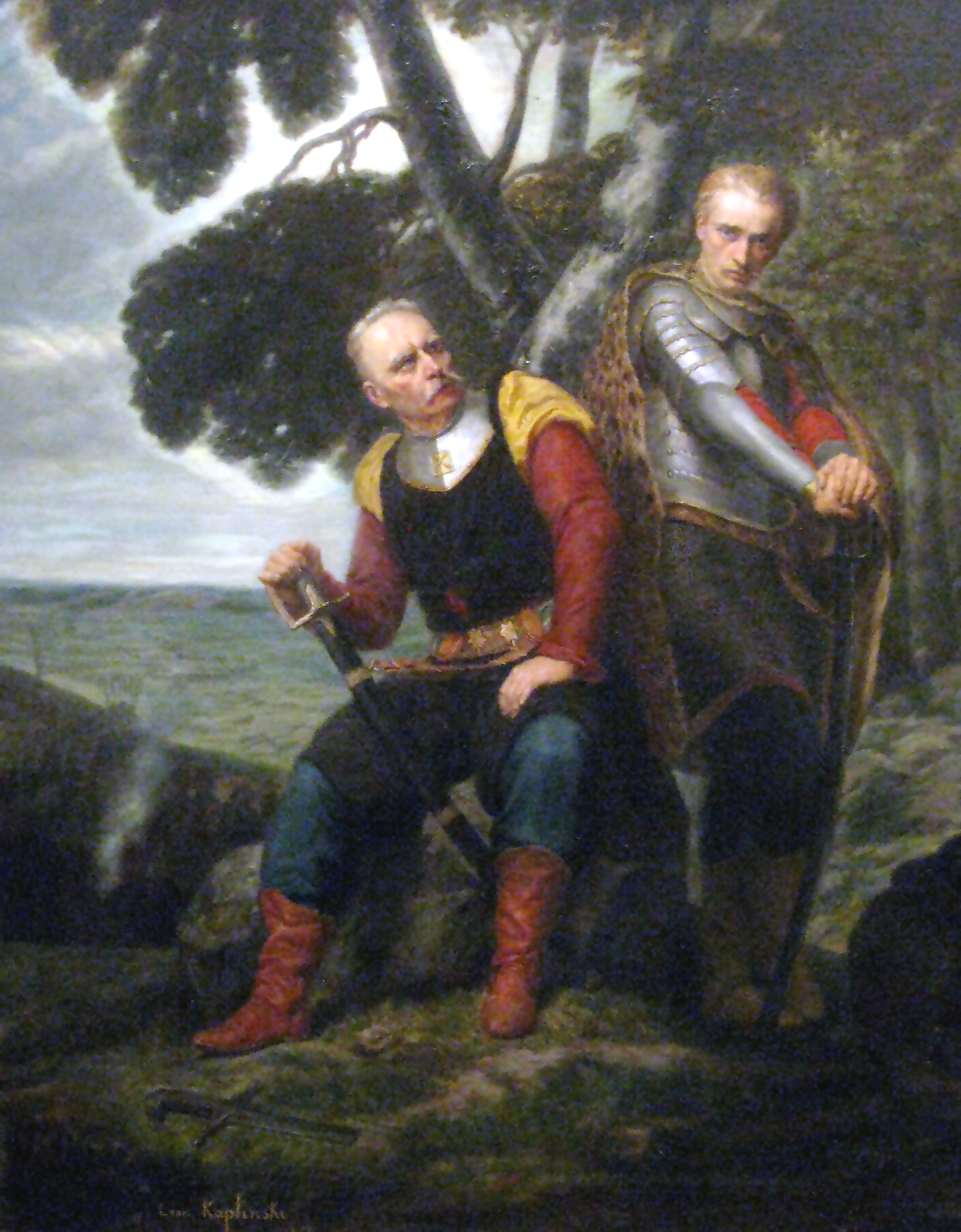
Wacław and his Sword-Bearer; illustration from Maria by Antoni Malczewski

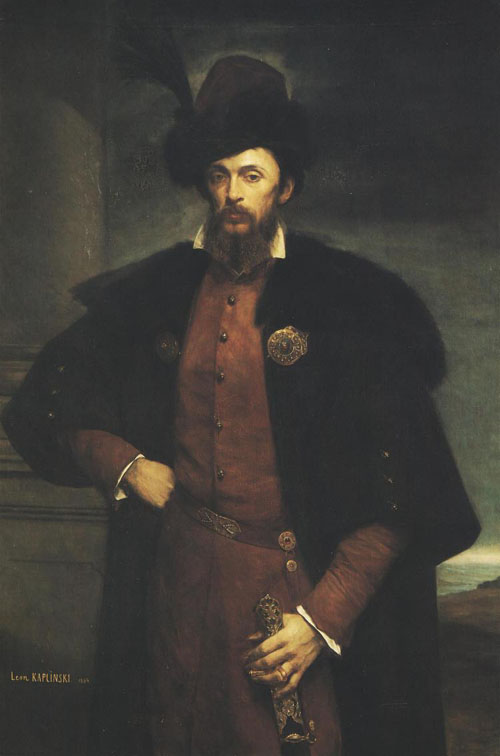
Political activist, Jan Kanty Działyński (1829-1880)

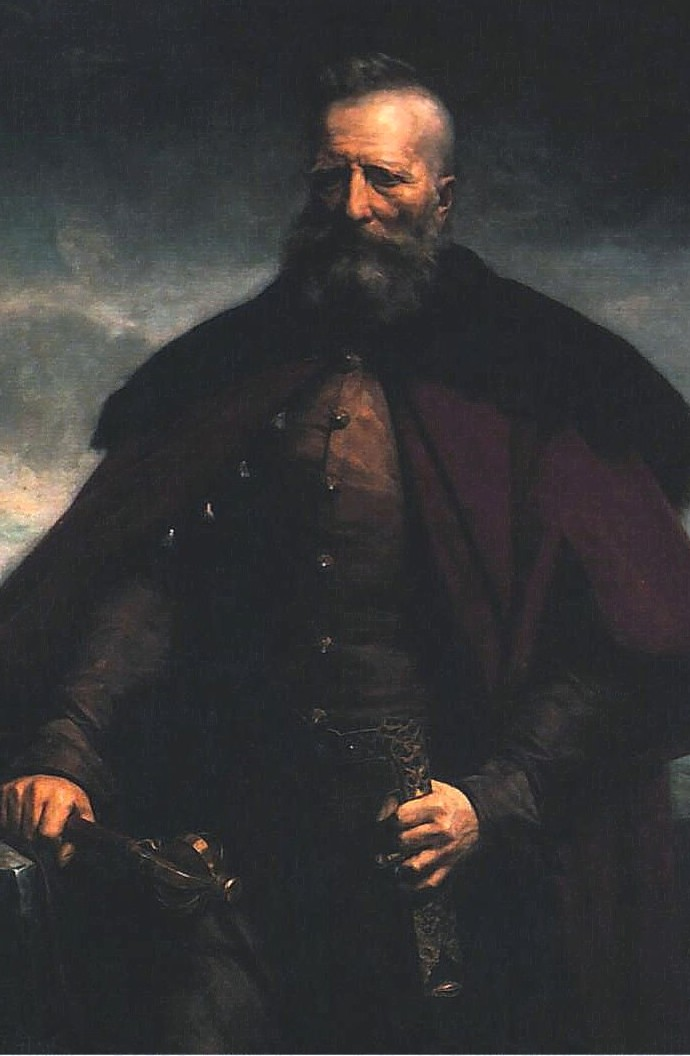
Jan Karol Chodkiewicz
