= Adam Jerzy Czartoryski =

Polish noble and statesman (1770–1861)

Prince Adam Jerzy Czartoryski
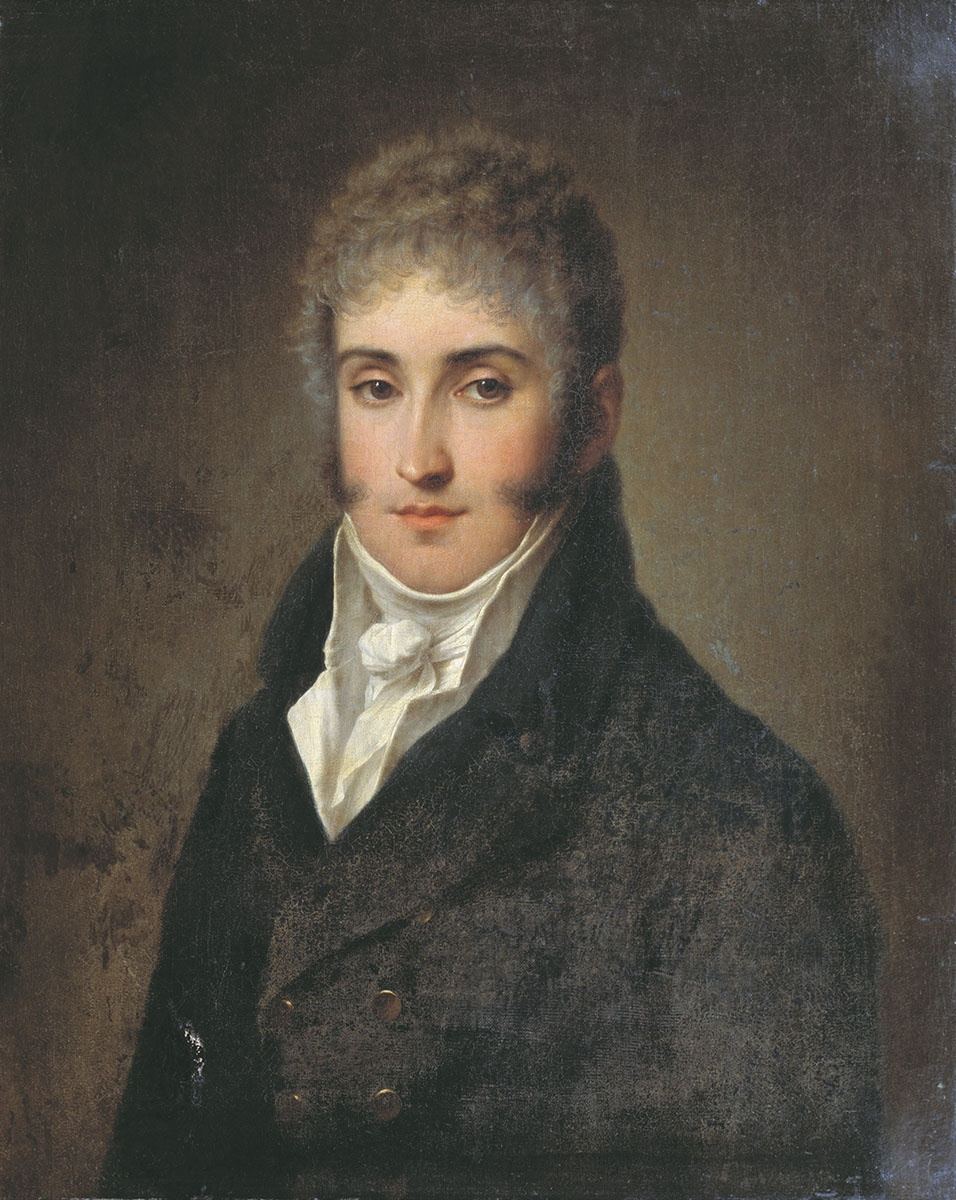
- Painting by Stepan Shchukin, 1808

Foreign Minister of the Russian Empire
- In office 1804–1806
- Monarch: Alexander I
- Preceded by: Alexander Vorontsov
- Succeeded by: Andrei Budberg

Chairman of the Council of Ministers of the Russian Empire (de facto)
- In office 1804–1806
- Monarch: Alexander I
- Preceded by: Alexander Vorontsov
- Succeeded by: Andrei Budberg

1st President of the Polish National Government
- In office 3 December 1830 – 15 August 1831
- Monarchs: Nicholas I (until 25 January) vacant
- Preceded by: None
- Succeeded by: Józef Chłopicki (as Dictator of the Polish Insurrection); Jan Krukowiecki

1st President of the Administrative Council
- In office 16 June 1815 – 24 December 1815
- Monarch: Alexander I
- Preceded by: Stanisław Kostka Potocki (as Prime Minister of Duchy of Warsaw
- Succeeded by: Józef Zajączek (as Namiestnik of Poland)

Personal details
- Born: 14 January 1770 Warsaw, Polish–Lithuanian Commonwealth
- Died: 15 July 1861 (aged 91) Montfermeil, France
- Spouse: Anna Zofia Sapieha (m. 1817; d. 1864)
- Children: Witold Czartoryski; Władysław Czartoryski; Izabella Elżbieta Czartoryska
- Parent(s): Adam Kazimierz Czartoryski; Izabela Flemming
- Profession: Politician, diplomat, author
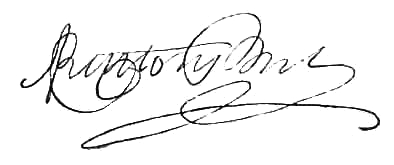
- Signature

Prince Adam Jerzy Czartoryski (Polish pronunciation: [ˈadam ˈjɛʐɨ t͡ʂartɔˈrɨskʲi]; Lithuanian: Аdomas Jurgis Čartoriskis; 14 January 1770 – 15 July 1861), also known as Adam George Czartoryski, was a Polish nobleman, statesman, diplomat and author who served as Chairman of the Council of Ministers of the Russian Empire.

The son of a wealthy prince, he began his political career as a foreign minister to Emperor Alexander I of Russia after Poland was partitioned by Russia, Prussia and Austria. He later became a leader of the Polish government in exile during the November Uprising 1830–1831 and a bitter opponent of Alexander I's successor, Nicholas I. In exile, he advocated for the reestablishment of a sovereign Polish state, which also stimulated early Balkan and Belgian nationalism, and intensified their desire for independence.

Czartoryski was a dedicated patron of arts and greatly contributed to the Czartoryski Collection. In 1798, he purchased one of Poland's most important national treasures – Leonardo da Vinci's Lady with an Ermine, which he brought as a gift for his mother, Princess Izabela Czartoryska from Italy.

== Early life and education ==
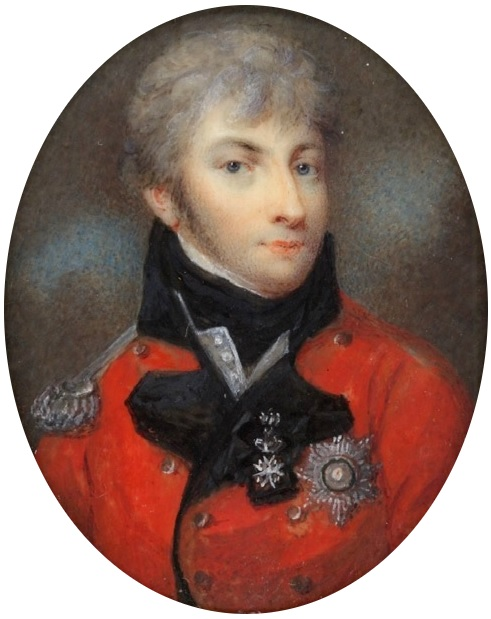
Adam Jerzy Czartoryski in 1798

Adam Jerzy Czartoryski was born on 14 January 1770 in Warsaw. He was the son of Prince Adam Kazimierz Czartoryski and Countess Izabela von Flemming. It was rumoured that Adam was the fruit of a liaison between Izabela and Russian ambassador to Poland, Nikolai Repnin. However, Repnin left the country two years before Adam Czartoryski was born, but Empress Catherine II dismissed Nikolai Repnin from his post on 10 April 1769.

His half-siblings were Teresa Czartoryska (1765–1780), Maria Anna Czartoryska, Konstanty Adam Czartoryski, Gabriella Czartoryska (d. 1780), Zofia Czartoryska and Cecylia Beydale (1787–1851).

After careful education at home by eminent specialists, mostly French, he went abroad in 1786. At Gotha, Czartoryski heard Johann Wolfgang von Goethe read his Iphigenia in Tauris and made the acquaintance of the dignified Johann Gottfried Herder and the "fat little Christoph Martin Wieland".

In 1789, Czartoryski visited Great Britain with his mother and was present at the trial of Warren Hastings. On a second visit in 1793, he made many acquaintances among the British aristocracy and studied the British constitution.

In the interval between these visits, he fought for Poland during the Polish–Russian War of 1792, which preceded the Second Partition of Poland. He was one of the early recipients of the Virtuti Militari decoration for valour there. He was arrested on his way to Poland at Brussels by the Austrian government. After the Third Partition of Poland, the Czartoryski estates were confiscated, and in May 1795, Adam and his younger brother Konstanty Adam were summoned to Saint Petersburg.

== Career in Russia ==
=== Friendship with Tsarevich Alexander ===
Later in 1795, the two brothers were commanded to enter Imperial Russian army military service. Adam became an officer in the horse guards and Konstanty in the foot guards. Catherine the Great was so favourably impressed by the youths that she restored them part of their estates and in early 1796 made them gentlemen-in-waiting, courtiers.

Adam had already met Grand Duke Alexander at a ball at Princess Natalia Feodorovna Shakhovskaya Golitsyna's (1779–1807) — favorite lady-in-waiting and best friend of Grand Duchess Elizabeth Alekseyevna and wife of Prince Alexander Mikhailovich Golitsyn (1772–1821) — and the two young men at once evinced a strong "intellectual friendship" for each other. Czartoryski was already connected with the imperial family. His elder sister Maria Anna was married to the then-Grand Duchess Maria Feodorovna's brother, Duke Louis of Württemberg. On the accession of Emperor Paul I, Czartoryski was appointed adjutant to Alexander, who was now Tsarevich, and was permitted to revisit his Polish estates for three months.

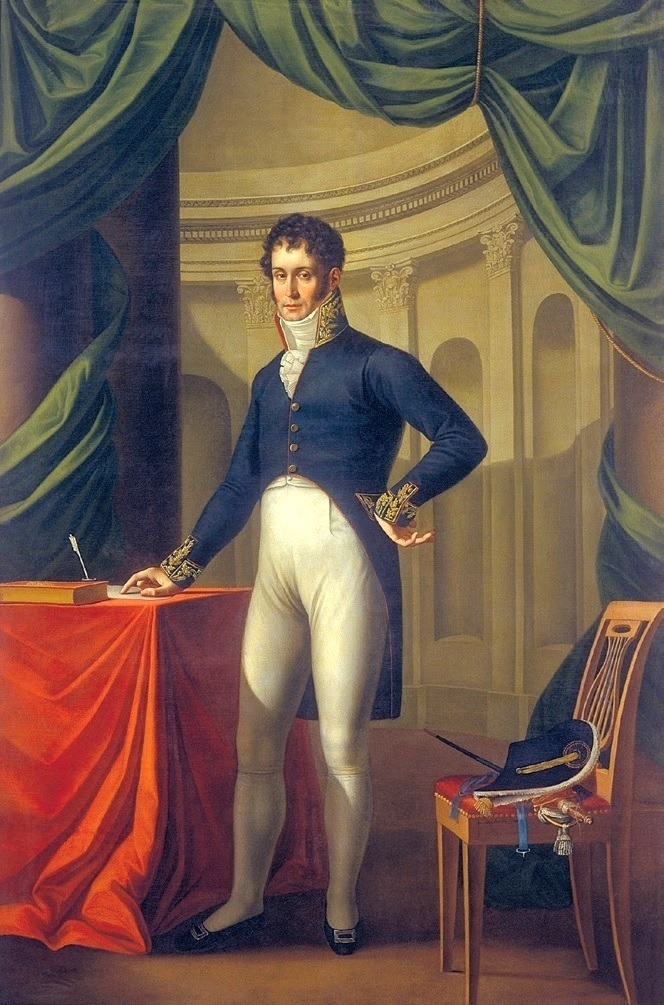
Adam Jerzy Czartoryski by Józef Oleszkiewicz 1810.

At this time, the tone of the Russian court was relatively liberal. Political reformers, including Pyotr Volkonsky and Nikolay Novosiltsev, possessed great influence on the tsar. Czartoryski was not only close with Tsarevich Alexander, but Alexander's wife, the Grand Duchess, Tsarevna Elizabeth Alexeievna as well. Born Princess Louise of Baden, she was married to the Grand Duke Alexander at the age of fourteen, and though she and Alexander shared a friendly bond, Alexander sought romantic comfort elsewhere. Elizabeth Alexeievna soon fell in love with Czartoryski, who reciprocated her feelings. After Elizabeth gave birth to a baby girl on 29 May 1799, the Grand Duchess Maria Alexandrovna, the Tsar Paul I didn't hide his suspicions, with both Elizabeth and Alexander having fair hair, and the baby having dark hair. Czartoryski was then sent on a diplomatic mission to the court of Charles Emmanuel IV of Sardinia. The baby died soon after. On reaching Italy, Czartoryski found that that monarch was a king without a kingdom and so the outcome of his first diplomatic mission was a pleasant tour through Italy to Naples, the acquisition of the Italian language and a careful exploration of the antiquities of Rome.

In the spring of 1801, the new emperor, Alexander I, summoned his friend back to Saint Petersburg. Czartoryski found the emperor still suffering from remorse at his father's assassination and could do nothing but talk about religion and politics to a small circle of friends. Against all remonstrances, he replied only, "There's plenty of time".

=== Curator of Vilna University ===
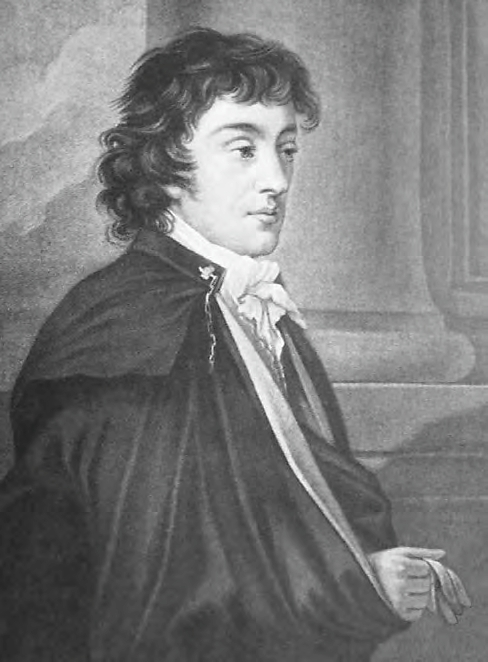
Czartoryski, as Tsar Alexander I's foreign minister, was key in forming the Third Coalition against France.

Emperor Alexander I appointed Czartoryski administrator of the Educational District of Vilna (Polish: Wilno, Lithuanian: Vilnius) and curator of the Vilna Academy (3 April 1803) so that he might give full play to his advanced ideas. He greatly improved the Polish education system. He was to keep those function until 1824.

=== Foreign minister ===
Czartoryski paid most attention to foreign affairs; as the emperor's key advisor, he exercised practical control of Russian diplomacy. His first act had been to protest energetically against Napoleon's murder of a Bourbon royal prince, the Duke of Enghien 20 March 1804, and to insist on an immediate rupture with the government of the French Revolution, which was under Napoléon Bonaparte, whom the emperor considered a regicide.

On 7 June 1804, the French minister, Gabriel Marie Joseph, Comte d'Hédouville, left Saint Petersburg, and on 11 August a note, dictated by Czartoryski to Alexander I, was sent to the Russian minister in London to urge the formation of an anti-French coalition. It was also Czartoryski who framed the Convention of 6 November 1804 whereby Russia agreed to put 115,000 and Austria 235,000, men in the field against Napoleon.

Finally, in April 1805, he signed an offensive-defensive alliance with George III's United Kingdom.

Czartoryski's most striking ministerial act, however, was a memorial written in 1805, otherwise undated, which aimed at transforming the whole map of Europe. Austria and Prussia were to divide Germany between them. Russia was to acquire the Dardanelles, the Sea of Marmora, the Bosporus with Constantinople and Corfu. Austria was to have Bosnia, Wallachia and Ragusa. Montenegro, enlarged by Mostar and the Ionian Islands, was to form a separate state. The United Kingdom and Russia together were to maintain the equilibrium of the world. In return for their acquisitions in Germany, Austria and Prussia were to consent to the creation of an autonomous Polish state extending from Danzig (Gdańsk) to the sources of the Vistula under the protection of Russia. That plan presented the best guarantee at the time for the independent existence of Poland. However, in the meantime, Austria had come to an understanding with Britain about subsidies, and war had begun.

=== Chief minister ===
In 1805 Adam Jerzy Czartoryski accompanied Alexander I to Berlin and to Olomouc, Moravia (now Czech Republic), as chief minister. He regarded the Berlin visit as a blunder, chiefly due to his distrust of Prussia, but Alexander ignored his representations, and in February 1807 Czartoryski lost favour and was superseded by Andrei Budberg.

Though no longer a minister, Czartoryski continued still to enjoy Alexander I's confidence in private, and in 1810, the Emperor candidly admitted to Czartoryski that in 1805 he had been in error and that had not made proper use of Czartoryski's opportunities.

The same year, Czartoryski left Saint Petersburg forever, but the personal relations between him and Alexander I were never better. They met again as friends at Kalisz (Greater Poland) shortly before the signing of the Russo-Prussian alliance on 20 February 1813, and Czartoryski was in the emperor's suite at Paris in 1814 and rendered him material services at the Congress of Vienna. At the Congress of Vienna, Alexander I had also been asked to agree to a divorce for the Empress Elizabeth so that she could marry Czartoryski. This request was refused.

== Career in Congress Poland (1815–1831) ==
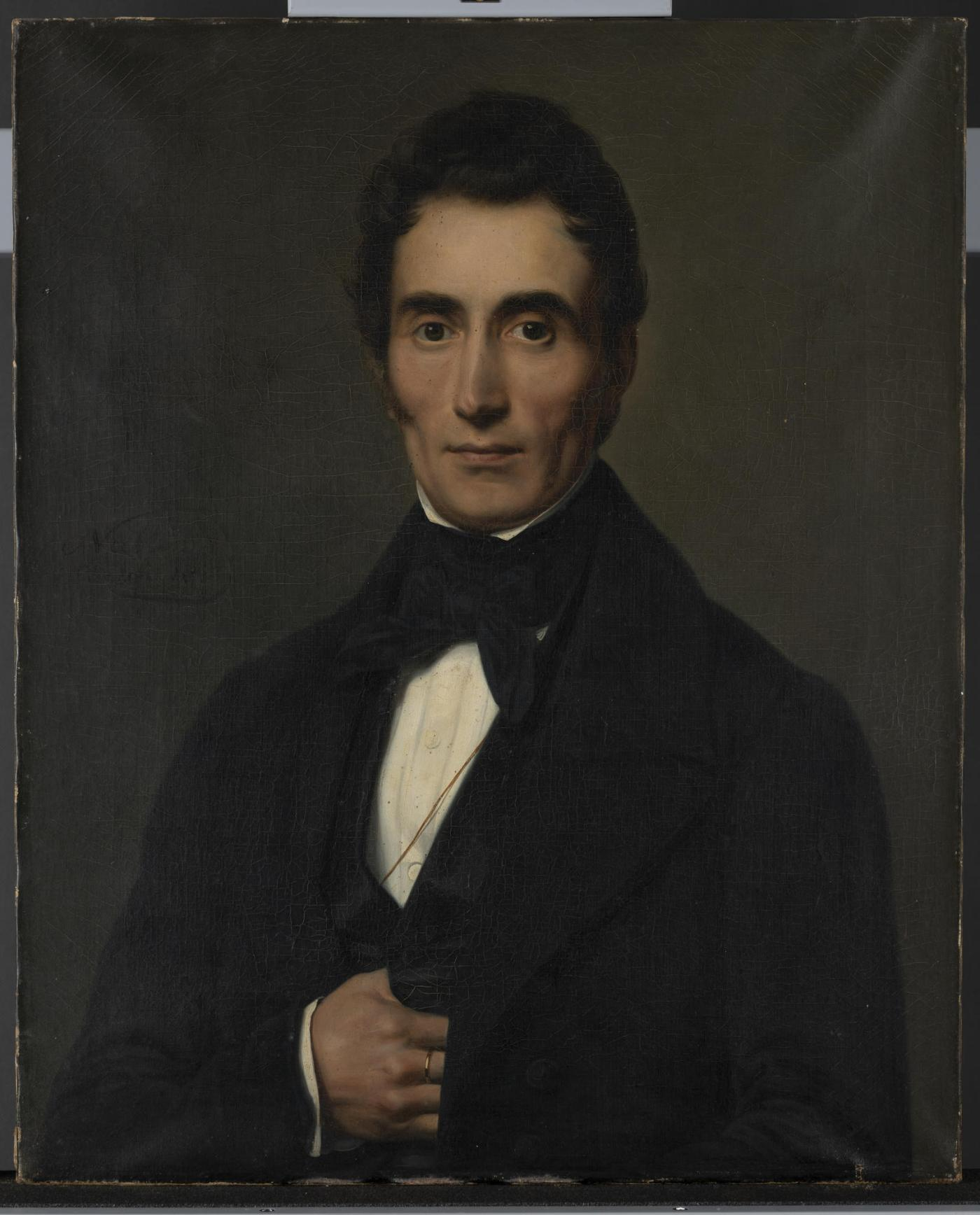
Adam Jerzy Czartoryski, by Jan Piotr Norblin 1829.

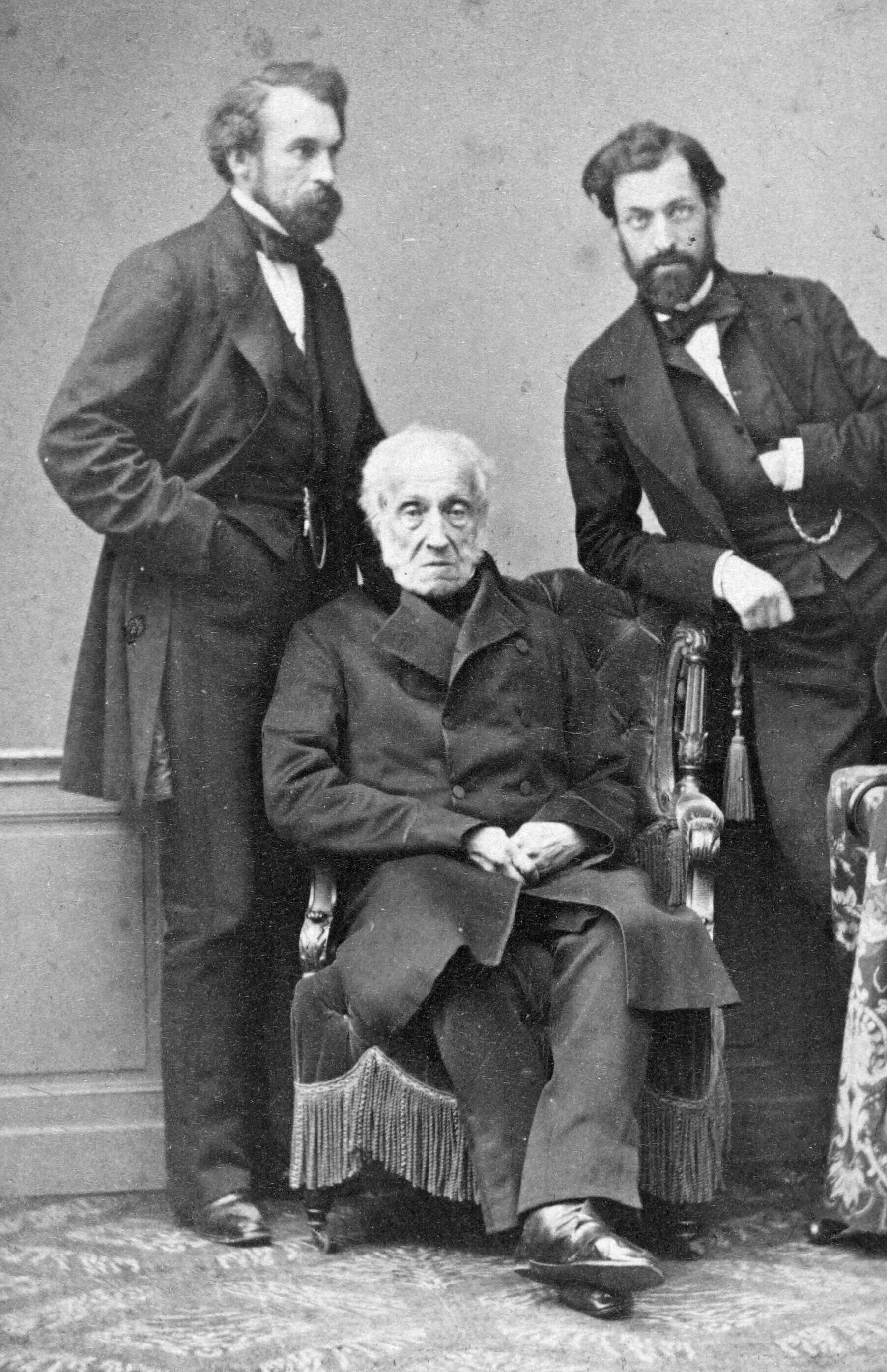
Czartoryski (seated) and sons in 1860. Standing to his left is Witold and on his right is Władysław Czartoryski.

=== Constitutional period (1815–1830) ===
It was considered that Czartoryski, who more than any other man had prepared the way for the creation of Congress Poland and had designed the Constitution of the Kingdom of Poland, would be its first namiestnik, or viceroy, but the emperor chose a general who had fought in the Grande Armée, Józef Zajączek. Czartoryski was content with the title of senator-palatine and a role in the administration.

In 1817, he married Princess Anna Zofia Sapieha (1799–1864). The wedding led to a duel with his rival, Ludwik Pac. They had three children: Witold (1824–1865), Władysław (1828–1894) and Izabella Elżbieta (1830–1899), who in 1857 married Jan Kanty Działyński.

On his father's death in 1823, Czartoryski retired to his ancestral Czartoryski Palace at Puławy. In 1824 he lost the charge of curator of the Wilno University, in relation with the Philomaths trial. He was replaced by Nikolay Novosiltsev.

=== Insurrectional period (1830–1831) ===
However, the 29 November 1830 uprising brought him back to public life.

He became president of the provisional government established on 3 December and summoned on 18 December 1830 the Sejm of 1831, which chose General Chlopicki as dictator. After Chlopicki's resignation on 18 January and the dethroning by the Sejm of Nicolas I as king of Poland on 25 January, Czartoryski was elected chief of the Polish National Government by 121 out of 138 votes on 30 January 1831.

In August 1831, the military situation was bad. General Ivan Paskevich was approaching Warsaw from the West and the commander-in-chief, General Jan Zygmunt Skrzynecki was dismissed on 9 August. On 15 and 16 August, there were riots in Warsaw, and many imprisoned supposed traitors, notably two generals, were hanged. Czartoryski decided to resign from the government after he had sacrificed half of his fortune to the national cause. He was replaced by General Jan Krukowiecki as both head of the government and commander in chief.

Yet the sexagenarian statesman continued to display great energy. On 23 August 1831, he joined Italian General Girolamo Ramorino's army corps as a volunteer and subsequently formed a confederation of the three southern provinces of Kalisz, Sandomierz and Kraków. At the war's end, when the uprising was crushed by the Russians — Warsaw was taken on 8 September — he fled under false identity to the Cracow Republic, then in Austria, and from there could reach England.

== Exile ==
=== London (1831–1832) ===
Afterwards, he was sentenced to death, though the sentence was soon commuted to exile. On 25 February 1832, while in the United Kingdom, he kept advancing the Polish cause and with the help of influential friends, many of them Scottish, inspired the creation of the Literary Association of the Friends of Poland, based in London, but with branches in Glasgow, Birmingham and Hull.

=== Paris (from 1832) ===
That same year, Czartoryski left England for France, taking up residence in Paris. As a magnate and arguably the most considerable Polish-émigré figure of the time – Czartoryski was Chairman of the Polish National Uprising Government, and leader of a political emigre party. Thousands of Poles had emigrated to France in the Great Emigration.

Adam Jerzy Czartoryski was an active leader of the mushrooming committees that were formed to maintain political momentum and salvage Polish cultural heritage in the exile community. He was the founding chairman, in April 1832, of a Historical and Literary Society. In 1838 he became the legal owner and founding president (for life) of the Polish Library in Paris, the first repository of polonica, books, and archives outside the territory of Poland, which had secured, with French public support, a building on the Ile Saint-Louis in the heart of Paris.

In 1843 he bought the Hôtel Lambert on the Île Saint-Louis and his political faction came to be identified by his private address, simply as the Hôtel Lambert.

=== Turkish projects ===
His tireless efforts on behalf of Poland continued well into his seventies: in 1842 he conceived a project to found a Polish settlement in rural Turkey. Czartoryski wanted to create a second emigration centre there, after the first one in Paris. He sent his representative, Michał Czajkowski, to Turkey and purchased a forest area which encompasses present-day Adampol from the missionary order of Lazarists. The settlement was named Adam-koj (Adamköy) after its founder, in Turkish, the "Village of Adam", whereas in Polish it was referred to as "Adampol". Polonezköy or Adampol survives to this day as a small village on the Asian side of Istanbul, about 30 kilometres from the historic city centre. At its inception, the village was inhabited by just 12 people, while at its peak, there were no more than 220 people. Over time, Adampol developed and became populated by emigrants from the unsuccessful 1848 Revolution, the Crimean War in 1853, and by escapees from Siberia and from captivity in Circassia. The Polish villagers engaged in agriculture, animal husbandry and forestry.

=== Diplomatic efforts for a new Polish Commonwealth ===
After the November Uprising in 1830–1831 until his death, Czartoryski supported the idea of resurrecting an updated Polish–Lithuanian Commonwealth on federal principles.

The visionary statesman and former friend, confidant and de facto foreign minister of Russia's Emperor Alexander I acted as the "uncrowned king and unacknowledged foreign minister" of a non-existent Poland.

Czartoryski was disappointed when the hopes that had he held as late as the Congress of Vienna of Alexander I undertaking reforms failed to materialise. His subsequent thoughts were distilled in a book, completed in 1827 but published only in 1830, Essai sur la diplomatie (Essay on Diplomacy). According to the historian Marian Kamil Dziewanowski, it is indispensable to an understanding of the Prince's many activities conducted in Paris following the ill-fated Polish November 1830 Uprising. Czartoryski wanted to find a place for Poland in the Europe of the time. He sought to interest Western Europeans in the adversities facing his stateless nation, which he still considered to be an indispensable part of the European political structure.

Adhering to the Polish motto, "for our freedom and yours", Czartoryski connected Polish efforts for independence with similar movements in other subjugated nations of Europe and in the East as far as the Caucasus. Thanks to his private initiative and generosity, the émigrés of his subjugated nation conducted a foreign policy often on a broader scale than had the old Polish–Lithuanian Commonwealth.

Of particular interest are Czartoryski's observations, in his Essay on Diplomacy, regarding Russia's role in the world. He wrote that, "Having extended her sway south and west, and being by the nature of things unreachable from the east and north, Russia becomes a source of constant threat to Europe." He argued that it would have been in Russia's greater interest to have surrounded herself with "friend[s rather than] slave[s]." Czartoryski also identified a future threat from Prussia and urged the incorporation of East Prussia into a resurrected Poland.

Above all, he aspired to reconstitute – with French, British and Turkish support – a Polish–Lithuanian Commonwealth federated with the Czechs, Slovaks, Hungarians, Romanians and all the South Slavs of the future Yugoslavia. Poland, according to his vision, could have mediated the conflicts between Hungary and the Slavs, and between Hungary and Romania. At the same time, the Belgian people were also seeking independence.

Czartoryski's plan seemed achievable during the period of national revolutions in 1848–1849, but foundered through the lack of western support, on Hungarian intransigence toward the Czechs, Slovaks and Romanians, and on the rise of German nationalism." "Nevertheless", Dziewanowski, concludes "the Prince's endeavour constitutes a [vital] link [between] the 16th century Jagiellonian [federative prototype] and Józef Piłsudski's federative-Prometheist programme [that was to follow after World War I]."

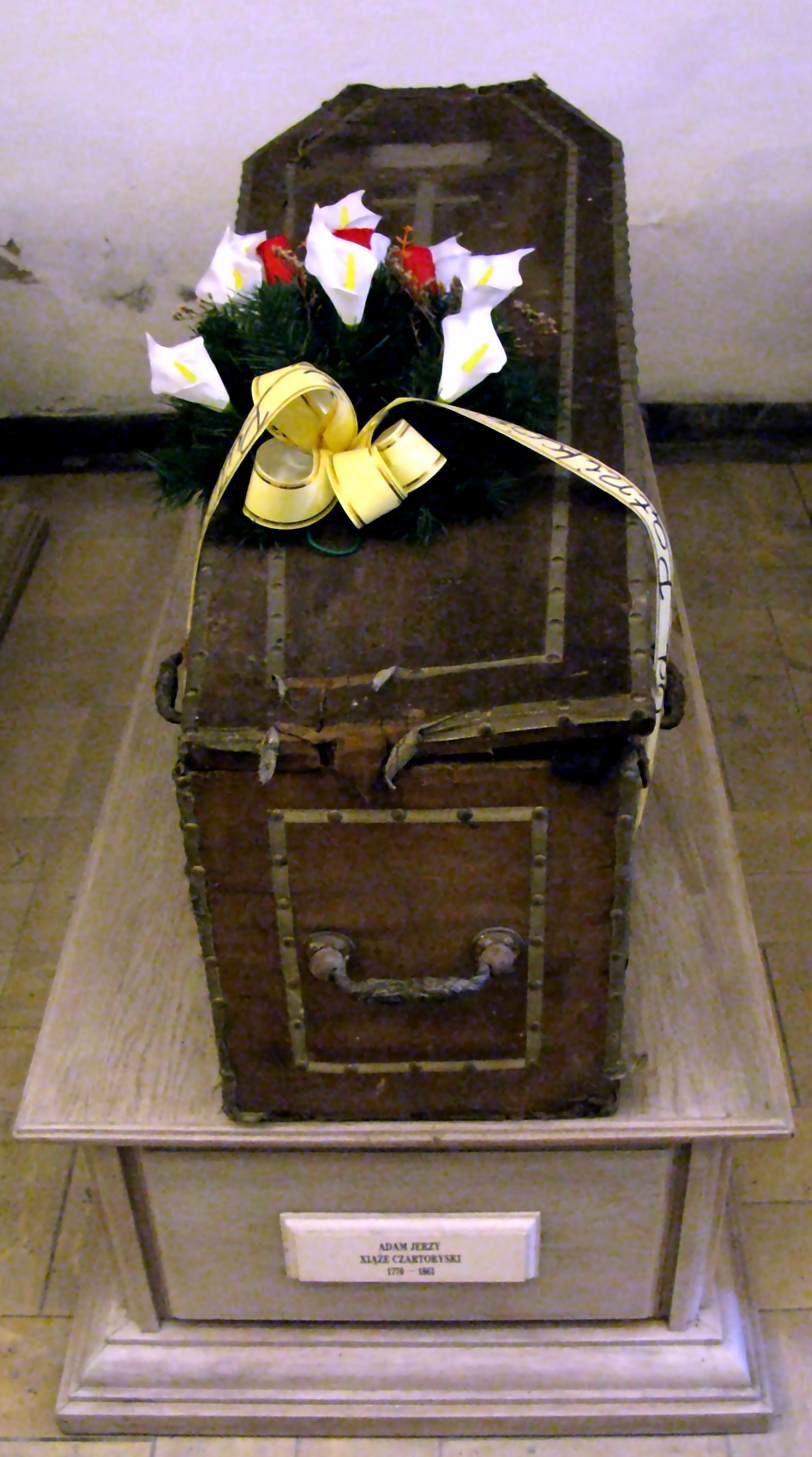
Czartoryski's casket in family vault in Sieniawa.

Adam Jerzy Czartoryski died aged 91 at his country residence east of Paris, at Montfermeil, near Meaux, on 15 July 1861.

== Awards ==
- Knight's Cross of the Order of Virtuti Militari
- Order of the White Eagle, 1815.

== Works ==
Czartoryski's principal works, as cited in the 1911 Encyclopædia Britannica, are Essai sur la diplomatie (Marseilles, 1830); Life of J. U. Niemcewicz (Paris, 1860); Alexander I. et Czartoryski: correspondence ... et conversations (1801–1823) (Paris, 1865); Memoires et correspondence avec Alex. I., with preface by C. de Mazade, 2 vols. (Paris, 1887); an English translation, Memoirs of Czartoryski, &c., edited by A. Gielguch, with documents relating to his negotiations with Pitt, and conversations with Palmerston in 1832 (2 vols., London, 1888).

== Popular culture ==
The 1975–1976 academic year at the College of Europe was named in his honour.

Czartoryski makes a cameo appearance in volume 3 of Leo Tolstoy's novel, War and Peace, at an Allied Council conference that takes place at Olomouc, Moravia on 18 November 1805, just before the Battle of Austerlitz.

== See also ==
- Scipione Piattoli
- Union of National Unity
- Intermarium (Międzymorze)
- List of Poles
- Polish nobility

Political offices
Preceded by Alexander Romanovich Vorontsov (acting)	Chairman of the Committee of Ministers (de facto); 1804–1806	Succeeded by Andrei Yakovlevich Budberg (de facto)
