= Great Emigration =

Period when large numbers of educated people fled Poland and Lithuania, 1831 to 1870

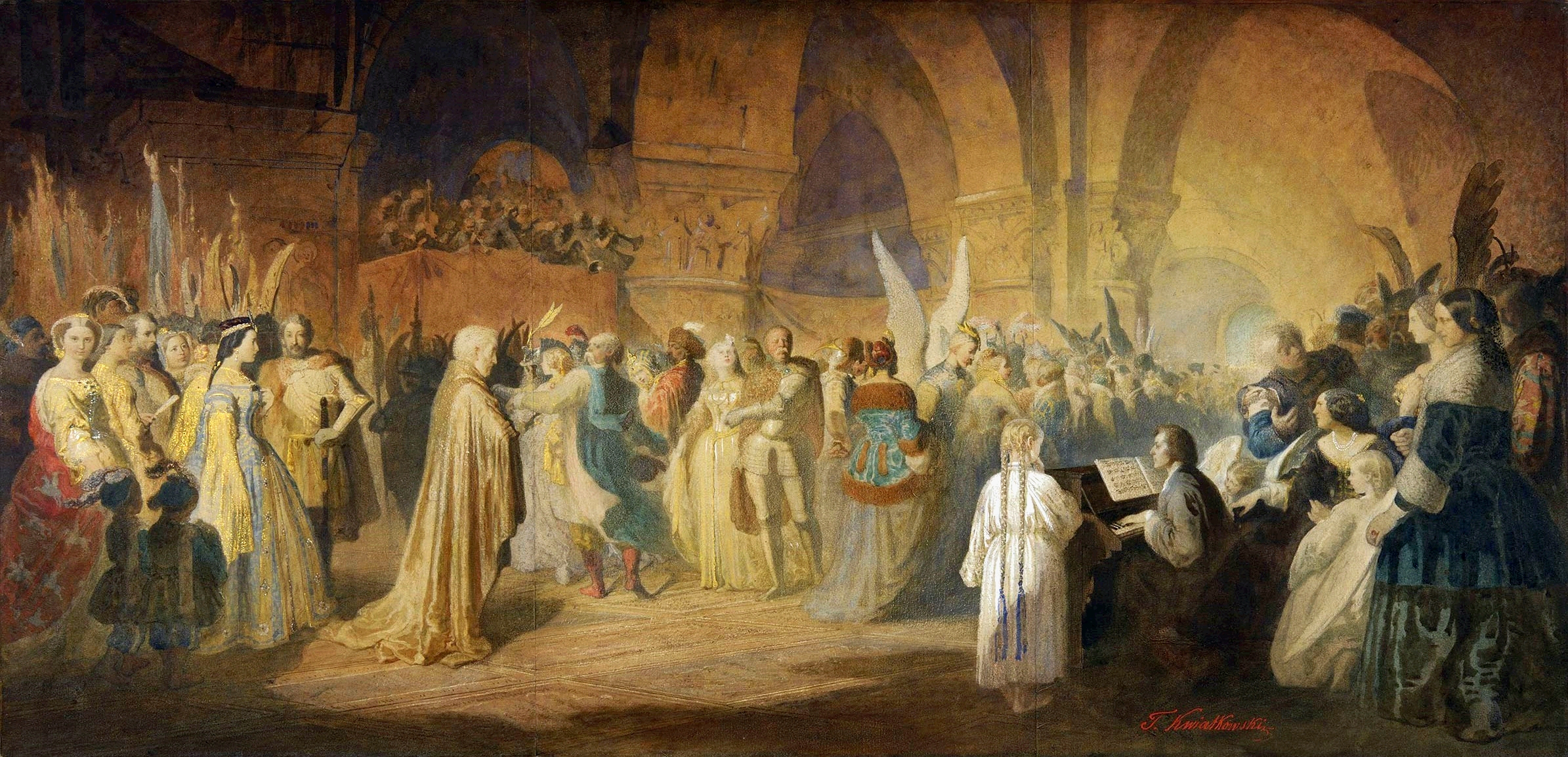
Chopin's Polonaise by Teofil Kwiatkowski. Polish aristocracy in exile in Paris

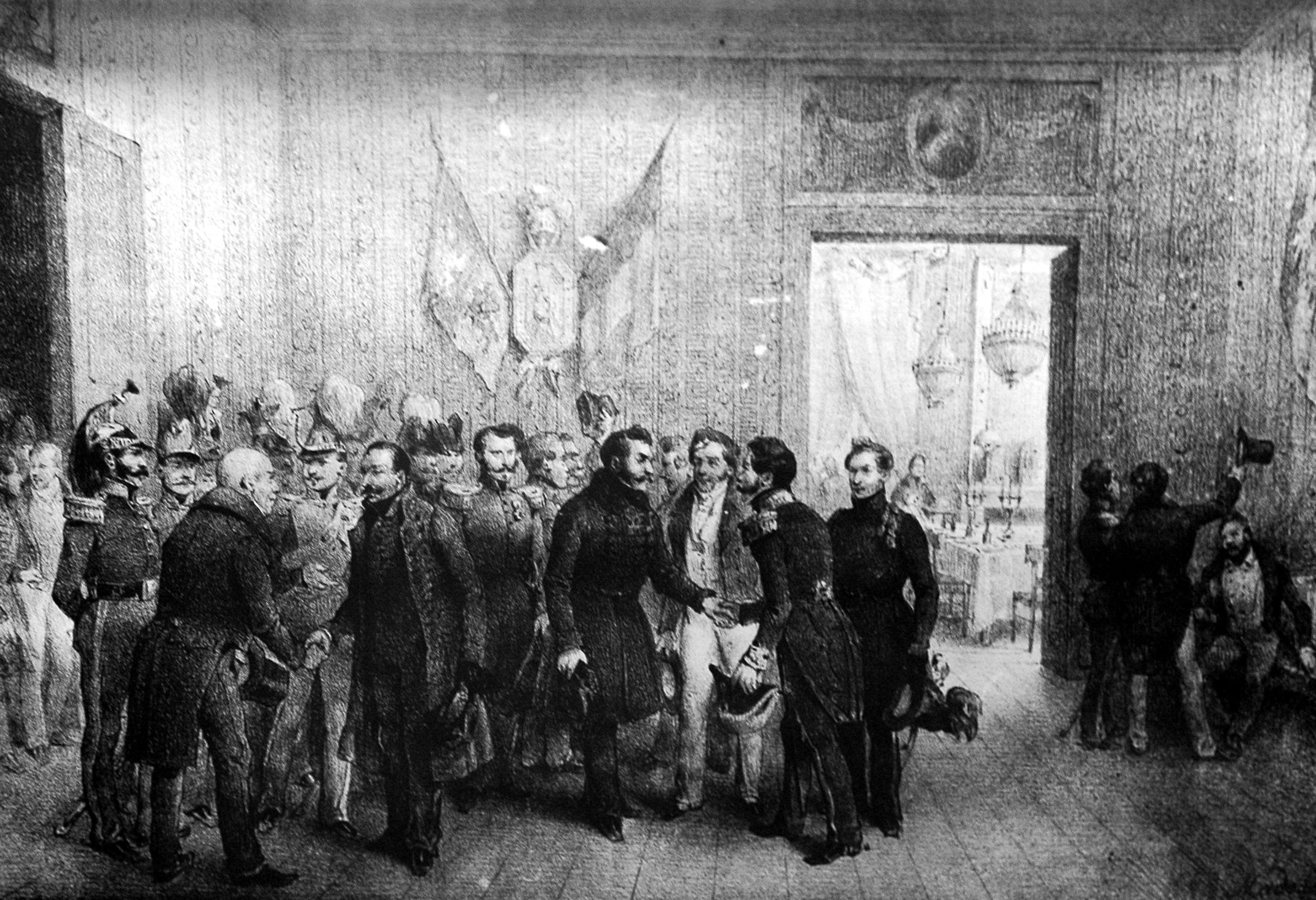
Polish Emigrants in Belgium, a 19th-century graphic

The Great Emigration (Polish: Wielka Emigracja) was the emigration of thousands of Poles, particularly from the political and cultural élites, from 1831 to 1870, after the failure of the November Uprising of 1830–1831 and of other uprisings such as the Kraków uprising of 1846 and the January Uprising of 1863–1864. The emigration affected almost the entirety of the political elite in Congress Poland. The exiles included artists, soldiers and officers of the uprising, members of the Sejm of Congress Poland of 1830–1831 and several prisoners-of-war who escaped from captivity.

== Polish emigration after the partitions ==
1st partition of Poland

From the end of the 18th century, a large portion of the Polish political landscape was dominated by those who carried out their activities outside of the country as émigrés. Their exile was the result of the Partitions of Poland, which completely divided the lands of the Polish–Lithuanian Commonwealth between the Russian Empire, the Kingdom of Prussia and the Habsburg Monarchy in Austria.

Because of the emigration of political elites, much of the political and ideological activity of Polish intelligentsia in the 18th and the 19th centuries took place outside of the regions of partitioned Poland. Most of the political émigrés based themselves in France.

== After the November Uprising ==
The most important wave of emigration came after the November Uprising of 1830–1831.

According to Rolf Malte, in the fall of 1831, around 50,000 people were forced to emigrate from Congress Poland and about 5,000 people from the former Grand Duchy of Lithuania. J. Zubrzycki estimates that the number of political refugees likely wasn't larger than 5,000–6,000 at any point in the period between 1831 and the last quarter of the 19th century.

Those Poles later fought and provided valuable support during the 1846 and 1848 revolutions in Poland. Their resistance was not limited to Polish revolutionary activity, as they also participated in various lands during the Revolutions of 1848, including France, the small principalities of Germany and Italy, Austria, Hungary, and the Danubian principalities Wallachia and Moldavia, the South American countries Argentina and Uruguay (participating in the "Guerra Grande" of 1839–1852) and in the Crimean War of 1853–1856. Additional waves of émigrés left the Polish lands after the failures of the attempted 1848 revolution and the January Uprising of 1863–1864.

Notable Poles of the Great Emigration included Prince Adam Jerzy Czartoryski, leader of the Polish government-in-exile in Paris (with embassies in London and Istanbul); politician Joachim Lelewel; national bards Adam Mickiewicz, Juliusz Słowacki, Cyprian Kamil Norwid, and Zygmunt Krasiński; as well as Leonard Chodźko, Ignacy Domeyko, Maurycy Mochnacki, Piotr Michałowski, Seweryn Goszczyński, Jozef Bohdan Zaleski, Aleksander Mirecki, Emil Korytko, Antoni Patek, Casimir Gzowski, Aleksander Jełowicki, Ignacy Szymanski and Adolf Zytogorski.

== See also ==
- Hôtel Lambert
- Polish Legions
- Polish minority in France
- Union of National Unity
- Agnieszka Baranowska
