= Stanisław Staszic =

Polish philosopher and writer (1755–1826)

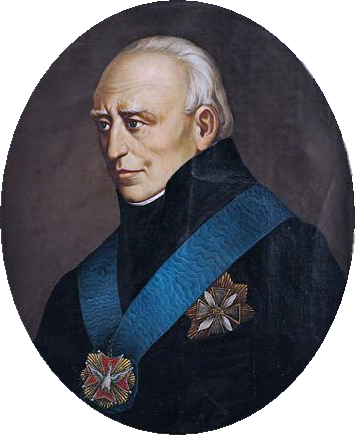
- Stanisław Staszic
- Born: 6 November 1755; Piła, Poland
- Died: 20 January 1826 (aged 70); Warsaw, Congress Poland
- Occupations: Philosopher, educator and writer

Philosophical work
- Era: Age of Enlightenment
- Region: Western philosophy: Polish philosophy
- School: Polish Enlightenment; Physiocracy; Pan-Slavism; Monism

Stanisław Wawrzyniec Staszic [staˈɲiswaf ˈstaʂit͡s] (baptised 6 November 1755 – 20 January 1826) was a Polish philosopher and writer.

A leading figure in the Polish Enlightenment, he was also a Catholic priest, geologist, poet, translator, and statesman.

A physiocrat, monist, pan-Slavist (after 1815) and laissez-fairist, he supported many reforms in Poland. He is particularly remembered for his political writings during the "Great (Four-Year) Sejm" (1788–1792) and for his support of the Constitution of 3 May 1791, adopted by that Sejm.

He cofounded the Warsaw Society of Friends of Learning (precursor to the Polish Academy of Sciences), of which he became president. He served as a member of the State Council of the Duchy of Warsaw and as minister of trade and industry in Congress Poland.

Staszic is seen as the father of Polish geology, statistics, sociology, Tatra Mountains studies and exploration, mining, and industry.

== Life ==
=== Early life ===
Stanisław Staszic was born into a burgher family in the town of Piła (he was baptised on 6 November 1755), the youngest of four siblings. His father, Wawrzyniec Staszic, was mayor of Piła and a royal secretary. His brothers were Antoni (1743–1775) and Andrzej (1745–1825), a priest.

Staszic attended secondary school at Wałcz. He studied theology and graduated from a Jesuit school at Poznań in 1778 and was ordained a Catholic priest (he took lesser Holy orders in 1774, and higher orders about 1778–1779). Between 1779 and 1781, he continued his studies in France at the Collège de France, where he took classes in physics and natural history.

On returning to Poland in 1781, he accepted a position as tutor in the house of Grand Crown Chancellor Andrzej Zamoyski. In 1782 he received a doctorate from the Zamojski Academy. He translated several works from French into Polish and briefly worked at the academy as a teacher of French language.

=== Reformer ===
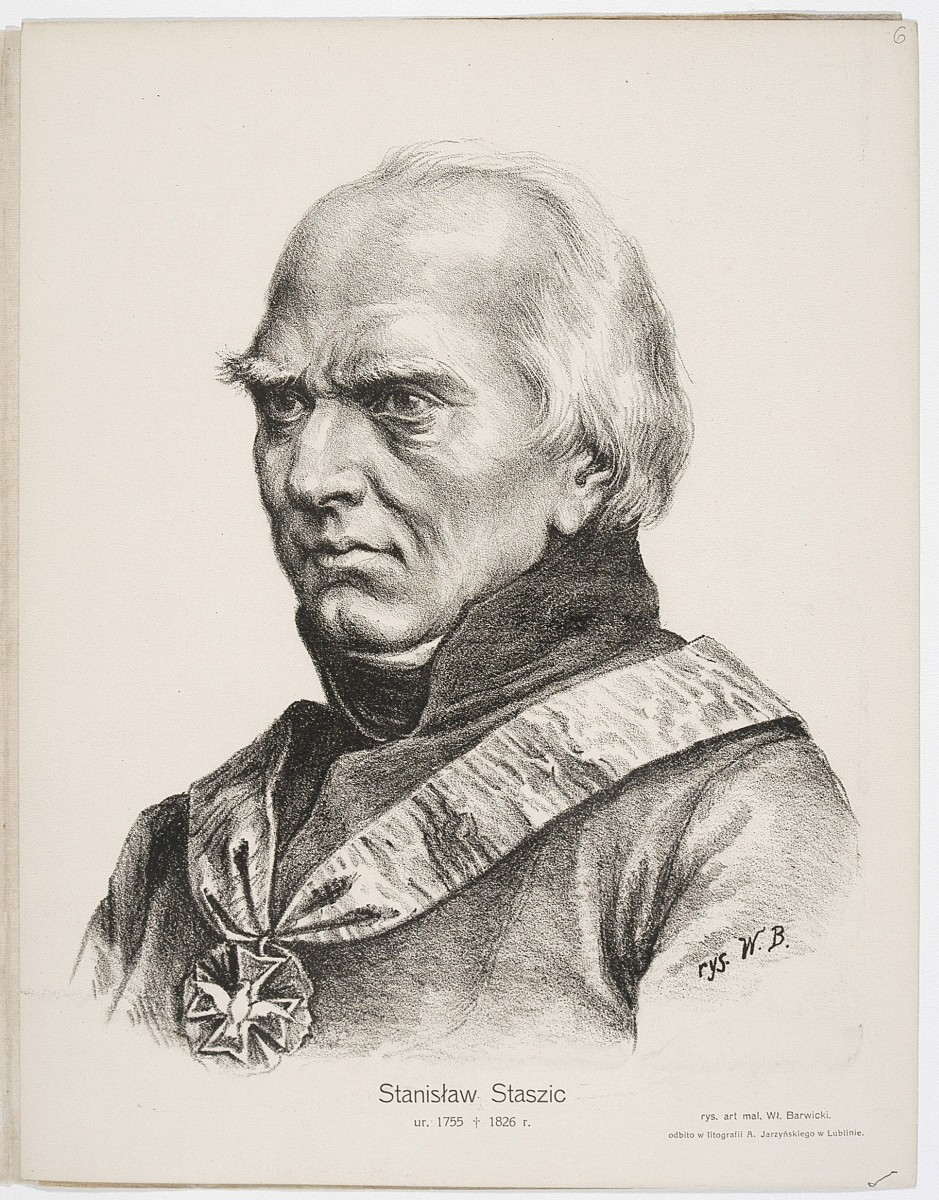
Staszic by W. Barwicki

His Remarks upon the Life of Jan Zamoyski (Uwagi nad życiem Jana Zamoyskiego, 1787), published anonymously on the eve of the Great Sejm, transformed the little-known tutor into one of the chief political thinkers of the late 18th-century Commonwealth. It became a model for other similar works and began a flood of political books and pamphlets unprecedented in the Commonwealth's history. It was reprinted numerous times, including in unauthorized editions.

Within his Remarks, Staszic did not portray the life of Jan Zamoyski (1542–1605, one of the most prominent statesmen in Polish history); rather, he argued that reforms are needed, and that Zamoyski had already proposed or supported many of them two centuries before. Staszic was a strong partisan of reforms and an ardent advocate for the interests of the lower classes. He advocated the abolition of the serfdom and improvements of the peasants' fate (by granting them land and private rights). He criticised the szlachta (Polish nobility) for inefficient governance, and argued that it showed itself too inept to be allowed to govern alone. He argued for a slight increase in taxes, which should allow the Commonwealth to create an army of 100,000 that would at least stand a chance against the still-larger armies of its neighbours. Although he preferred republicanism in theory, in the Commonwealth context he agreed that a strengthening of the central (royal) power was the most practical solution for reforming the country, in line with the similar developments elsewhere in Europe. In Remarks he even supported the introduction of an absolute monarchy in Poland.

Staszic was a keen observer of the proceedings of the Great Sejm, spending much time in Warsaw since the Sejm began its deliberations in 1788. He continued publishing new books and pamphlets. His Warnings for Poland, coming from the current European politics and natural laws, by the writer of the remarks upon the life of Jan Zamoyski (Przestrogi dla Polski z teraźniejszych politycznych Europy związków i z praw natury wypadające przez pisarza uwag nad życiem Jana Zamoyskiego, 1790), together with his previous Remarks, are considered among the most influential works of the Polish Enlightenment. In Warnings, he criticised the magnates of Poland and Lithuania, monastic orders and serfdom, and supported the enfranchisement of the townsfolk. Although he was not a participant in the Sejm, he was an influential onlooker, and through his widely read and discussed writings of the time, he is recognized as one of the founding fathers of the Constitution of 3 May 1791.

During 1790–1791 he accompanied Zamoyski's family on a trip abroad, and continued to serve as an adviser to the family, although his relations with the sons (Aleksander August Zamoyski, Stanisław Kostka Zamoyski) had become strained; he would eventually align himself with the daughter of the family, Anna Zamoyska (Anna Jadwiga Sapieżyna). He supported the 1794 Kościuszko Uprising, a failed attempt to liberate Commonwealth from foreign influence following the events of the 1793 Second Partition of Poland, donating money to the insurgents' cause. Upon the defeat of the Uprising, he accompanied the family on their trip to Vienna. He also made some successful financial investments, including in the stock market. He then served as an economic adviser for the Zamoyski and the Sapieha families, invested in their estates, and lent them money.

=== Late life ===
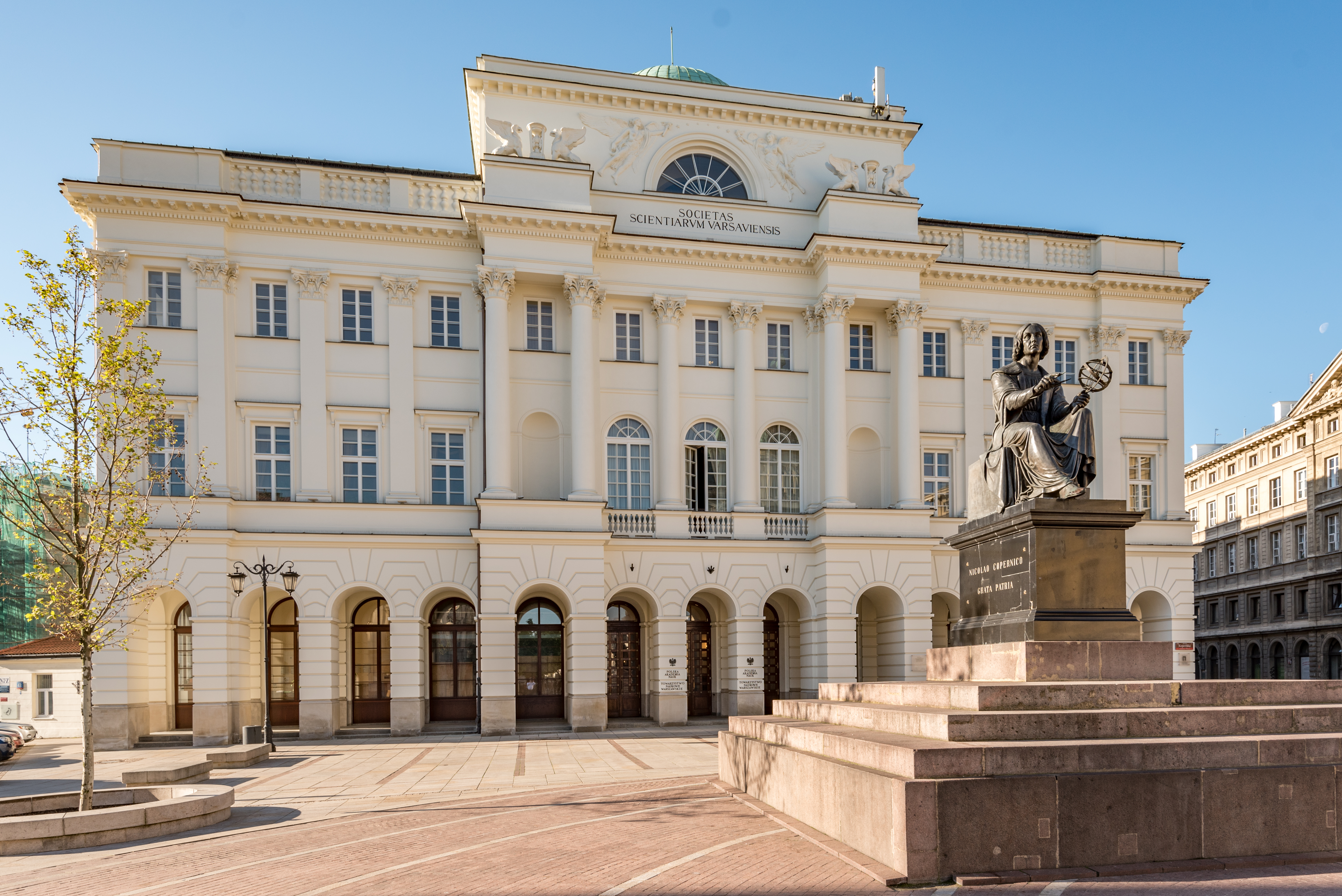
Polish Academy of Sciences (Staszic Palace), Warsaw

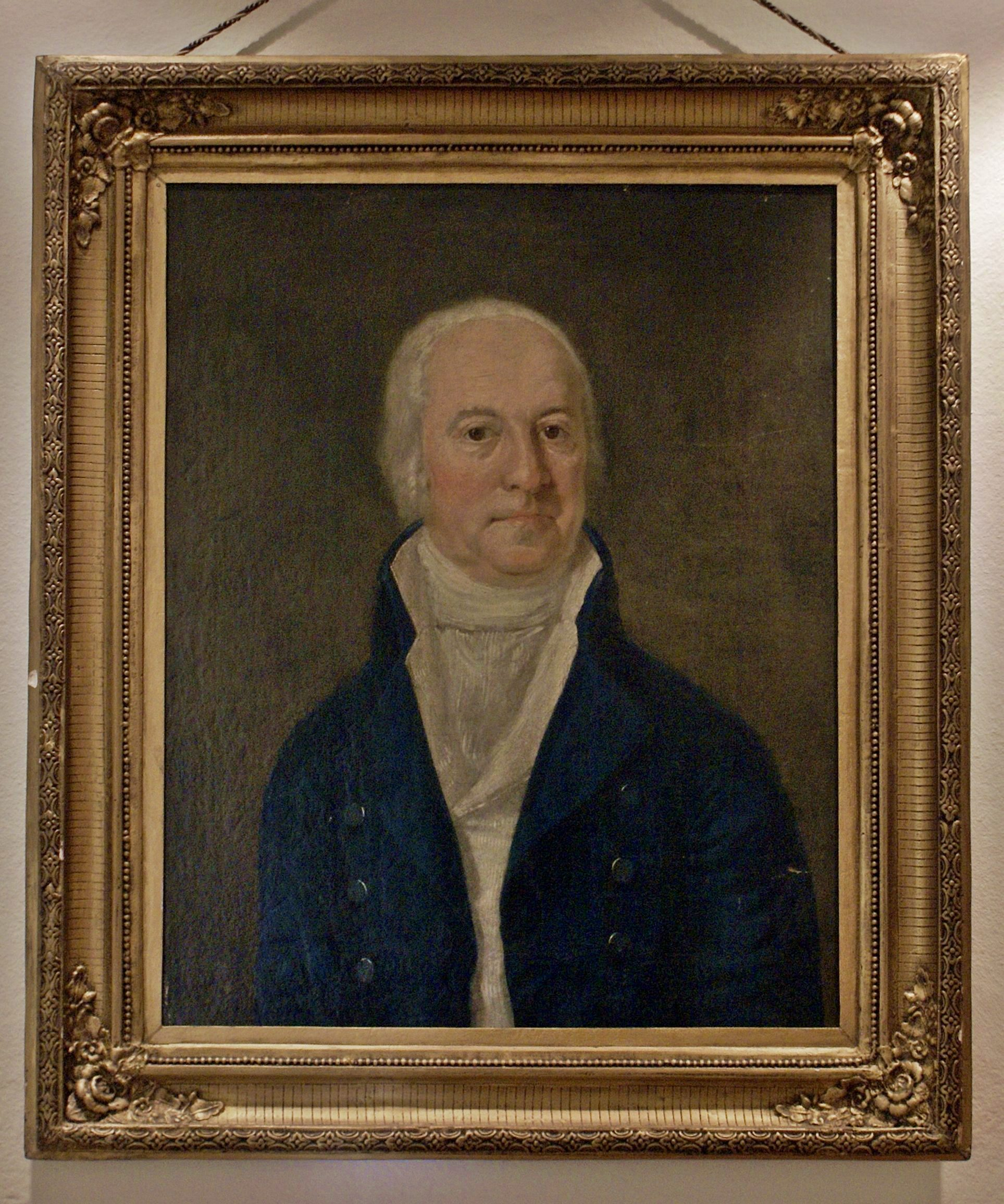
Staszic, 1820s

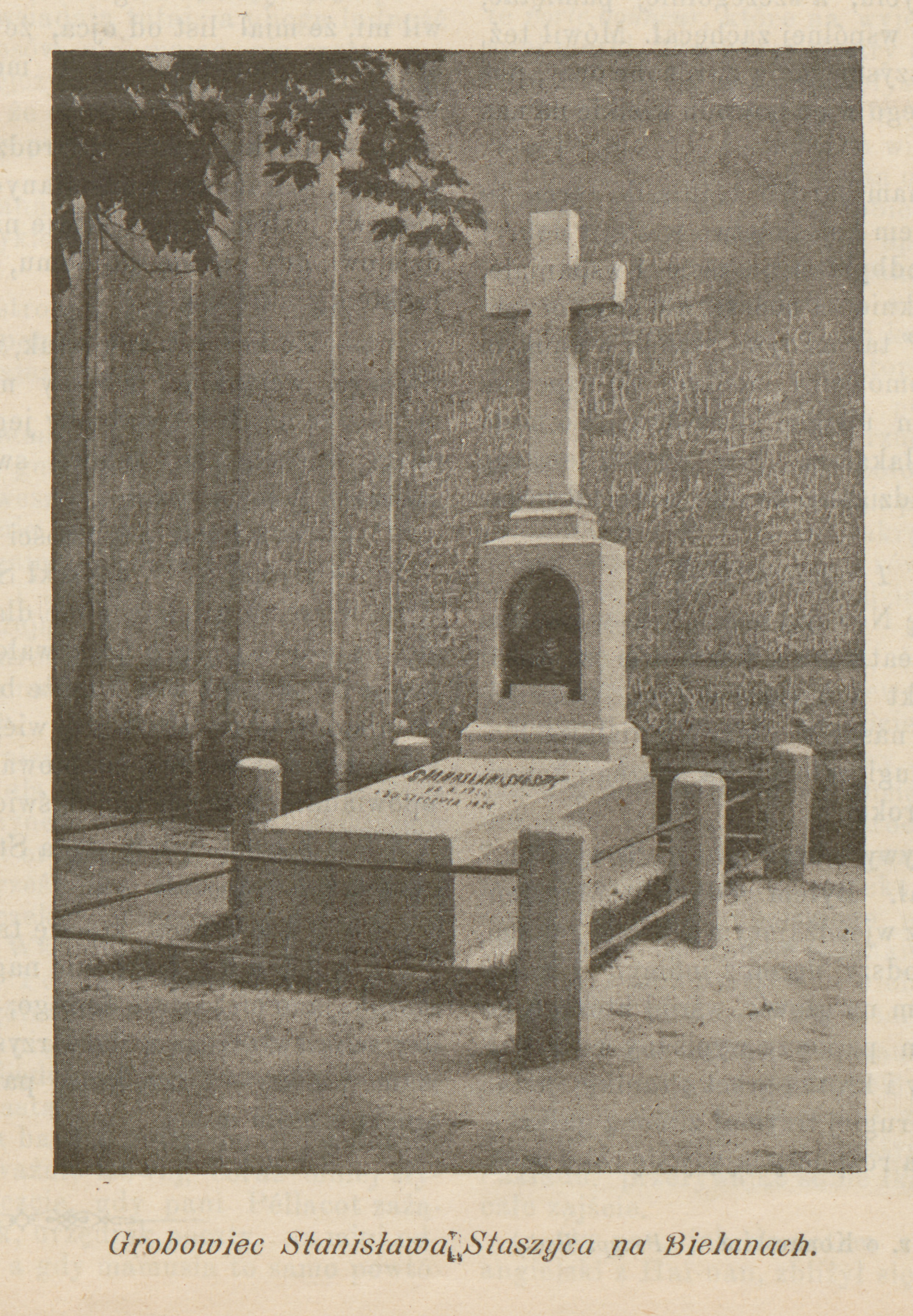
Grave in Warsaw

After Poland's partitions, in which Russia, Prussia, and Austria seized all of the Commonwealth's territory, Staszic was active in many scientific and scholarly initiatives. He studied the geology of the Carpathian Mountains. In 1800, he co-founded the Warsaw Society of Friends of Learning; from 1802, he was one of its most active members. In 1804, he went to France, where he observed the changes wrought by Napoleon. On return to Poland in 1805, he spent some time in the Tatra Mountains, where he continued his geological studies and conducted ethnographic ones. He worked with Jan Chrystian Hoffmann on a geological map of Poland. In the Duchy of Warsaw, he worked with the Ministry of Education (Izba Edukacyjna Księstwa Warszawskiego) and was involved in numerous educational reforms and initiatives. He also briefly worked with the Ministry of Treasury.

From 1808, he was president of the Society of Friends of Learning (Towarzystwo Przyjaciół Nauk, or TPN), forerunner to the Polish Academy of Sciences (Polska Akademia Nauk); he would be elected repeatedly as the society's president until his death. In 1808 he also became referendary to the State Council (Rada Stanu) of the Duchy; in 1810 he became a full member. In the council, he was active in regard to questions of education and the economy. As TPN president, he was active in many initiatives that supported and popularized science in Poland. He oversaw the construction of a headquarters for the TPN, which came to be known as the "Staszic Palace".

From 1814, he supported the Russian Empire, seen as a Pan-Slavist ally of Poland, and favored the idea of a great Slavic monarchy. After the fall of the Duchy of Warsaw in 1815, he became a member of the government of the newly created small state of Congress Poland (in personal union with Russia), initially in the new Ministry of Education and Religion, in 1816 serving as deputy minister. In 1815, he was decorated with the Order of Saint Stanislaus. In 1819, he endorsed a controversial censorship law, damaging his reputation.

His 1815 Polish translation of Homer's Iliad met with a negative reception. In 1816–1820 he published many of his writings in a 9 volume Works (Dzieła). Volumes 7–9 comprised his Humankind: A Didactic Poem (Ród Ludzki. Poema Dydaktyczne), a gigantic philosophical essay and poem that is regarded as an important contribution to the history of Polish philosophy. However, the work ran afoul of the new censorship law and was not distributed, much of the edition eventually being destroyed.

He also carried out studies on education and on human behavior, in a social-science tradition. Some of his views and theories made him a precursor of evolutionism in the natural and social sciences. In his essays on human nature, he declared for the primacy of science and was relatively critical of the influence of religion. These views gained him some critics, as he was seen as a priest who had abandoned religion.

From 1816, he was involved in mining research and projects. He also actively supported industrial development in Poland. He was one of the first to see the importance of coal, and supported the development of metallurgy-related projects, from mines to zinc and steel mills. He was also involved in the development of ceramic and textile industries, and improving the transport infrastructure (roads, canals). He discovered coal deposits in Dąbrowa Górnicza, where he initiated the building of a coal mine. Between 1816 and 1824 he was the de facto minister of industry of the Congress Poland (styled officially the "director of the Department of Trade, Crafts and Industry") and initiated construction of the Old Polish Industrial Area (Staropolski Okręg Przemysłowy). As his projects did not result in quick returns, he incurred increasing criticism, and eventually resigned from his position in 1824.

In 1816, he founded the Hrubieszowskie Towarzystwo Rolnicze (Hrubieszów Agricultural Society), seen by some as the first Polish cooperative.

He died in Warsaw on 20 January 1826, most likely due to a stroke. His funeral gathered 20,000 people, including the viceroy of the Congress Poland, Józef Zajączek. He was buried in the Camaldolese Hermit Monastery in Warsaw. His testament left his property at Hrubieszów to its tenants, and much of his wealth went to various philanthropic initiatives.

== Private life ==
Staszic was remembered by his contemporaries as a loner and not a person who was quick to make friends. He has been described as somewhat miserly; despite acquiring significant wealth, he was said to wear old clothes and use an old carriage. He was nonetheless widely respected by his contemporaries. He was seen as stern but honest and had a tendency to speak in a fashion that some found amusing.

== Remembrance ==
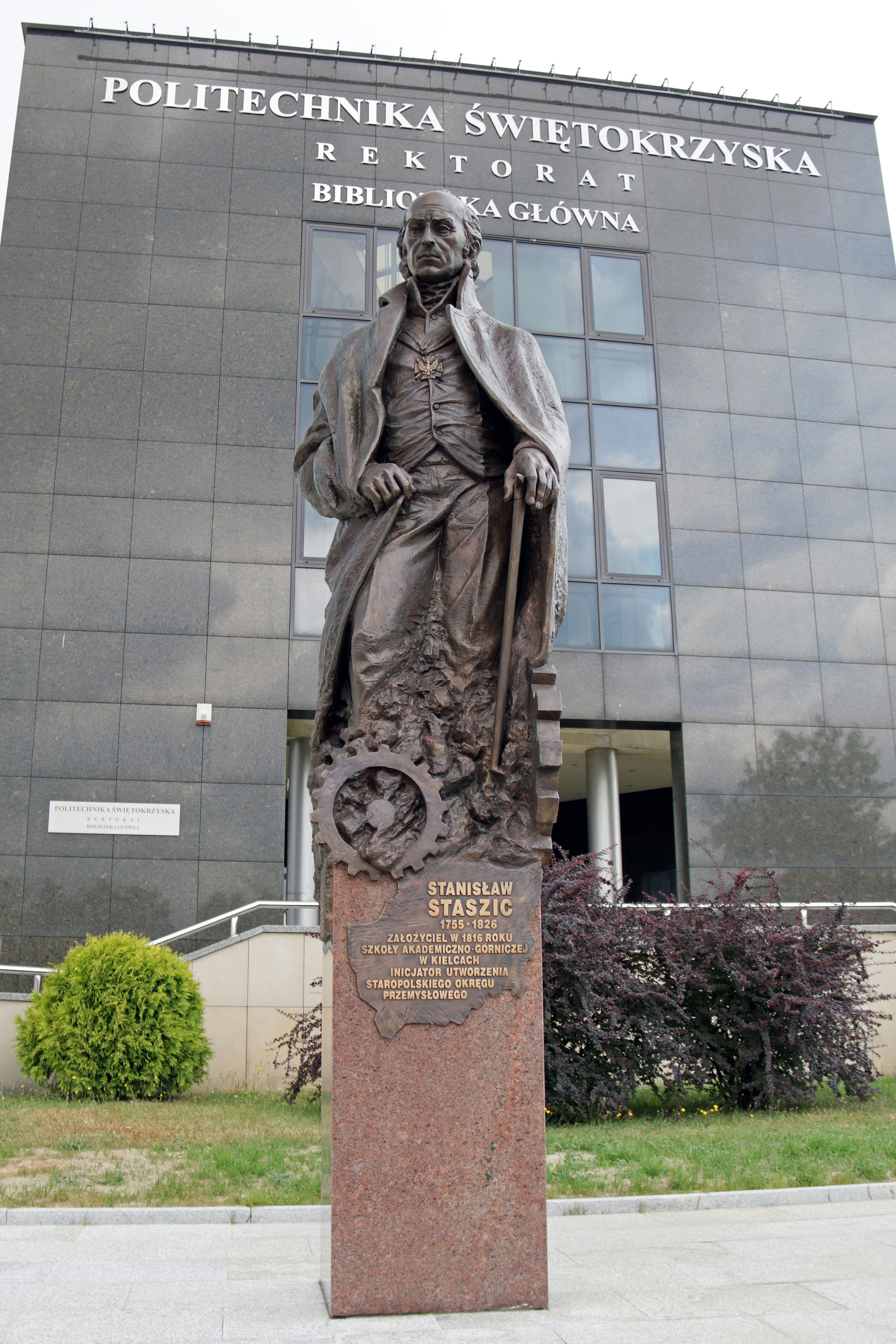
Stanisław Staszic monument in Kielce

He is seen as one of the chief representatives of the political activists and writers of the Polish Enlightenment. He is also seen as the father of Polish geology, statistics, sociology, Tatra Mountains studies and exploration, mining and industry. He is one of the figures immortalised in Jan Matejko's 1891 painting "Constitution of 3 May 1791". He was also the protagonist of the Charles Dickens' novella "Judge Not" (1851), and of Hanna Muszyńska-Hoffmanowa's novel "Pucharek ze srebra" (Little chalice of silver). Wacław Berent published a biography of Staszic, but it is now lost. In 1926, on the 100th anniversary of his death, he was celebrated in the Second Polish Republic with several studies, articles and publications.

In April 1951, he was honoured on a postage stamp of the People's Republic of Poland as part of the set issued for the First Congress of Polish Science. His figure was popular among the Marxist scholars of the People's Republic, who stressed his materialist, determinist and anti-clerical views. The 150th anniversary of his death in 1976 was also celebrated, with many works dedicated to him, including poems by Jan Czeczot and Jan Lohmann. He has been made a patron of over 200 schools, including the AGH University of Science and Technology in Kraków. There are statues of Stanisław Staszic in Łódź, Kielce, Hrubieszów and Dąbrowa Górnicza. Several geographical landmarks, minerals and a bacterium bear his name as well. In Piła, there is a Museum of Stanisław Staszic, which has gathered various artifacts related to him, and publishes a journal, "Zeszyty Staszicowskie" (Staszic Notebooks).

== Awards ==
- Order of Saint Stanislaus
- Knight of the Order of the White Eagle

== Works ==
His best-known works include the following:

- "Remarks upon the Life of Jan Zamoyski" (Uwagi nad życiem Jana Zamoyskiego, 1787)
- "Warnings for Poland" (or Warnings to Poland, Przestrogi dla Polski, 1790)
- "On the Origin of Mountains in Former Sarmatia and Later Poland" (O ziemorództwie gór dawnej Sarmacji, potem Polski, 1815)
- "On the Reasons of Jewish Noxiousness" (O przyczynach szkodliwości Żydów, 1818)
- "Humankind" (Ród Ludzki, 1820)
- A Polish translation of Homer's Iliad (1815).

== See also ==
- History of philosophy in Poland
- List of Poles
- Hugo Kołłątaj
- Piotr Skarga
