= Tomasz Zamoyski (disambiguation) =

Tomasz Zamoyski (1594–1638) was a Polish-Lithuanian nobleman and magnate.

Tomasz Zamoyski may also refer to:

- Tomasz Antoni Zamoyski (1707–1752), Polish nobleman
- Tomasz Franciszek Zamoyski (1832–1889), Polish nobleman
- Tomasz Józef Zamoyski (1678–1725), Polish nobleman
- Tomasz Zamoyski (1861–1935), Polish count, owner of Jabłoń and Iwie, son of August and Elfryda née Tyzenhauz, husband of Ludmiła née Zamoyska, father of Elżbieta, Elfryda and August .
- Jan Tomasz Zamoyski (1912–2002), Polish political activist
