= Liegnitz Ritter-Akademie =

Former knight academy

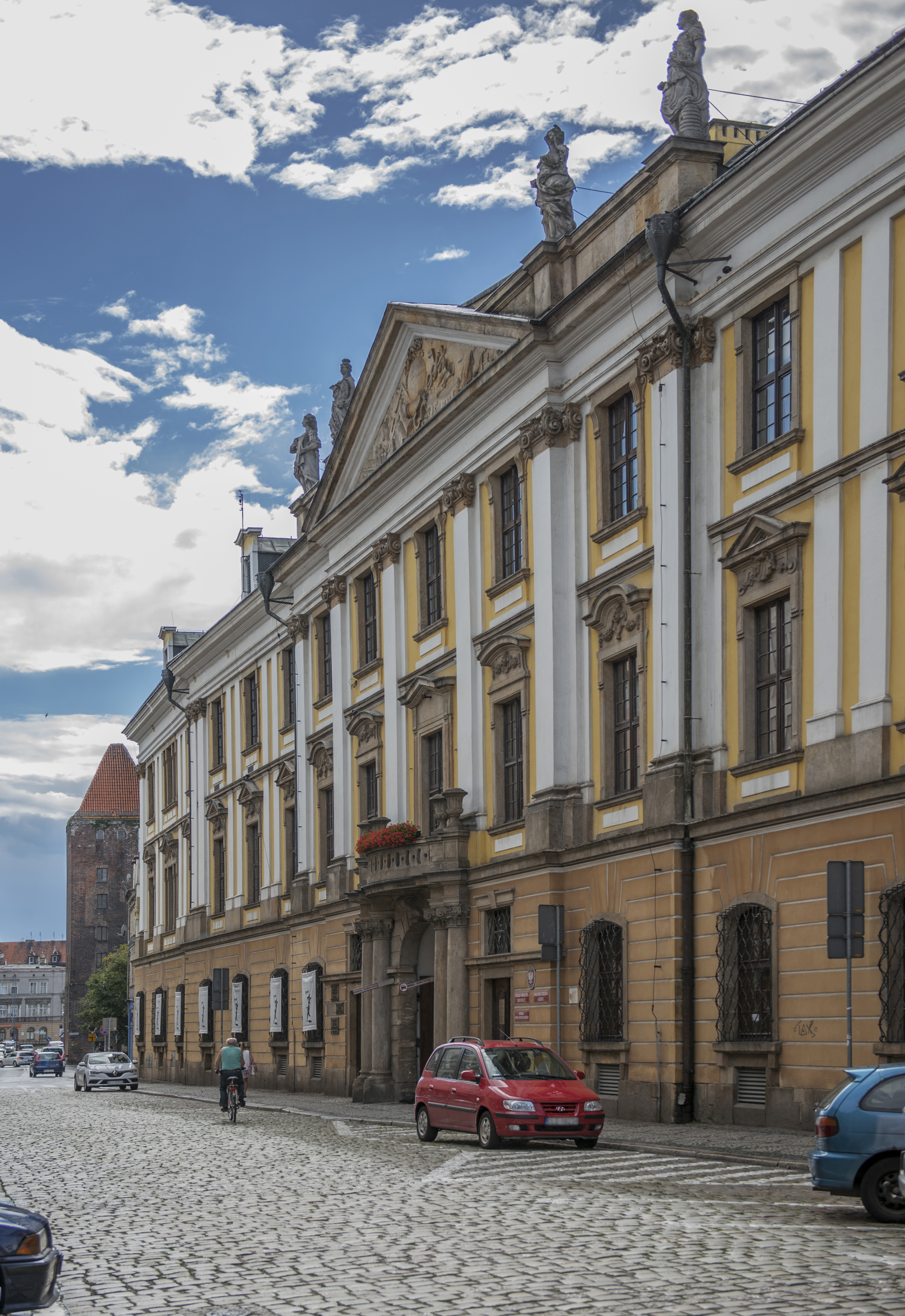
- Building of the former knight academy in Legnica

Location
- Legnica; 51°12′30″N 16°09′32″E

Information
- Type: Knight academy
- Established: 18th century
- Closed: 1945
- Gender: Boys

The Liegnitz Ritter-Akademie (Polish: Akademia Rycerska w Legnicy) was a knight academy, established in the early 18th century in Liegnitz, Lower Silesia. It educated the sons of magnates and nobles from Silesia, the Habsburg Monarchy, German states and the Polish-Lithuanian Commonwealth.

It was established shortly after the signing of the Treaty of Altranstädt (1707). The school was erected was erected in the Habsburg ruled town of Liegnitz, and at least in part was founded from money earlier collected by Duke George Rudolf of Liegnitz, who had planned a school of this type in his capital.

It operated as a school until 1945 and then after World War II, in 1945–1992, the building served as one of the main Soviet quarters in Poland, specifically for the Northern Group of Forces.

== History ==
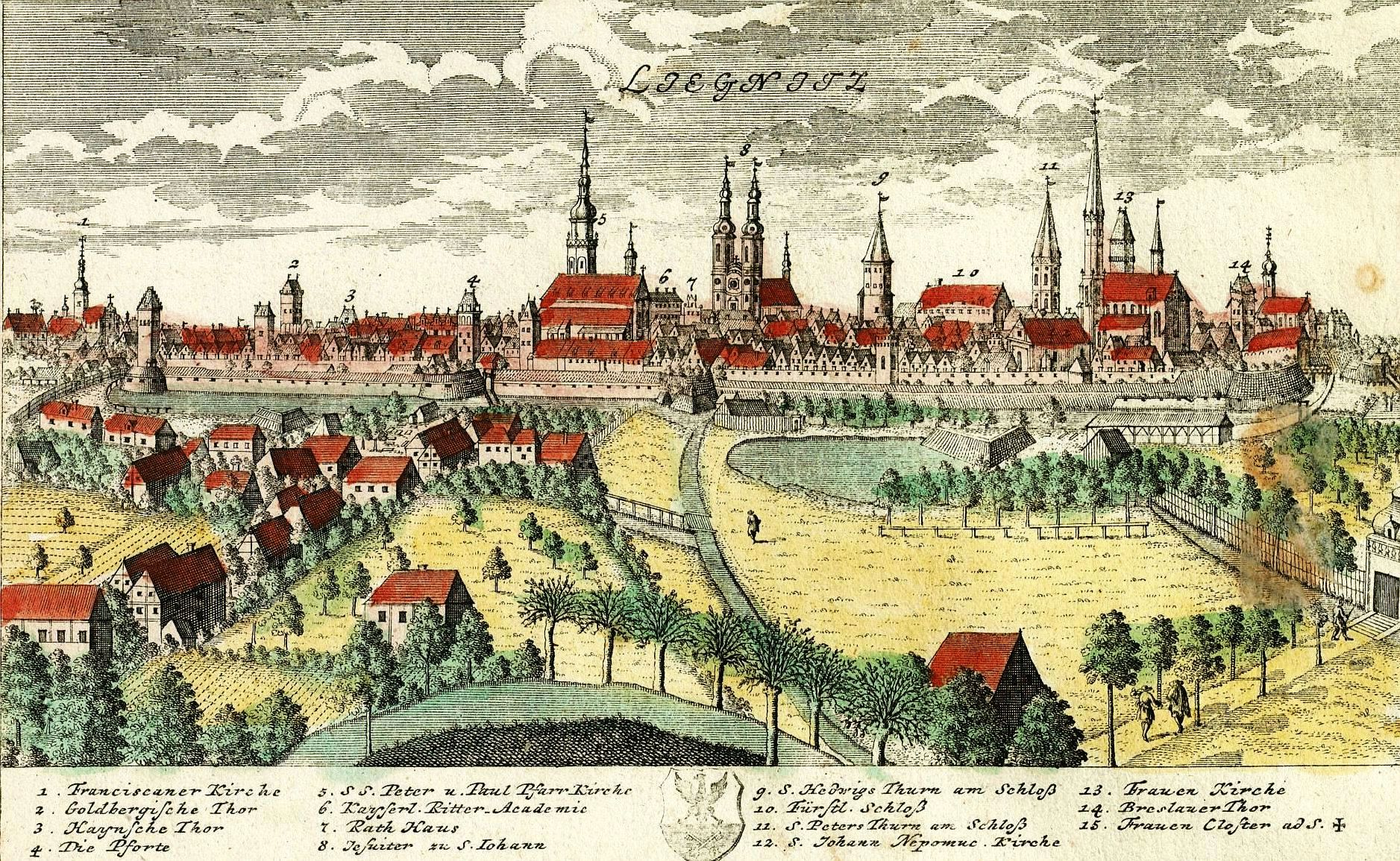
View of Legnica in 1738. Knight's Academy marked with number 6.

The duke of Liegnitz, George Rudolf of Liegnitz († 1653) of the Piast dynasty, died childless. He left in his will of 1646 substantial means for the establishment a school for noble Protestant boys from Silesia, placed under the administration of the centuries long existing in town church of St. John through the Johannisstiftung. After the death of duke Rudolf's great-nephew George William Piast (born 1660, ruler 1672–1675), the last governing Piast, his territory was taken over by the Habsburgs as part of the Counter-Reformation which forced Catholicism on the people of Silesia. The assets of the Johannisstiftung(St. John's Foundation) were seized by the emperor Leopold I and the St. John's church was handed over to Jesuit Order Only after Altranstaedter convention of 1708 the assets of the Johannisstifung were effectively released for a new school for the aristocracy, in equal numbers for boys of both denominations. The main building of the Ritter-Akademie was built in the years 1726–1738 in the baroque style to the design of the architect Joseph Emanuel Fischer von Erlach. The pupils wore a blue uniform with yellow collar and yellow cuffs, with blue-yellow garrison cap, but no weapon. Famous students included Tomasz Antoni Zamoyski, Andrzej Hieronim Zamoyski, and Feliks Łojko-Rędziejowski.

By 1809, there were only seven pupils enrolled in the school, which had two teachers, one clerk, and fifteen Unterbeamte on staff. In 1811 the academy was opened to non-aristocrats, and by 1901 it became a national school existing until 1945. From 1945 to 1992 it was the headquarters for Soviet troops stationed in Silesia, now a part of Poland. The building has since been restored.

== Teachers and high-level personnel ==
- 1708: August Bohse (1661–1740), was from 1708 a professor at the Ritter-Akademie
- 1788: Karl Abraham baron von Zedlitz (1731–1793), Prussian minister of education and law (from 1770), was from 1788 to 1789 director of the Ritter-Akademie
- 1815: Friedrich Karl Hermann Kruse (1790–1866), historian, was around 1815 a teacher at the Ritter-Akademie
- 1818: Carl Friedrich Mosch (1784–1859), mineralogist, draughtsman and a writer, was from 1818 to his retirement 1835 teacher at the Ritter-Akademie
- 1910: Hans's Ernst count von Carmer Carmer-Zieserwitz (1861–1922), property owner at Zieserwitz, member of the Prussian Lower House and the realm diet, Prussian major, was around 1910 curator of the Ritter-Akademie
- 1910: Antonius Dietrich von Auer (1860–1923), Prussian major, was around 1910 governor of the Ritter-Akademie
