= Jan Zamoyski (disambiguation) =

Jan Zamoyski (1542–1605) was a Polish magnate, grand chancellor and grand hetman of the Crown.

Jan Zamoyski may also refer to:

- Jan Jakub Zamoyski (1716–1790), Polish magnate, voivode of Podolia
- Jan Kanty Zamoyski (1900–1961), Polish aristocrat
- Jan Tomasz Zamoyski (1912–2002), Polish politician
- Jan Zamoyski (died 1619), Polish magnate, castellan of Chełm
- Jan Zamoyski (1627–1665) or Sobiepan, Polish magnate, voivode of Kiev and Sandomierz
