= Sacred Museum of the Zamość Cathedral =

Museum in Poland

- Muzeum Sakralne Katedry Zamojskiej
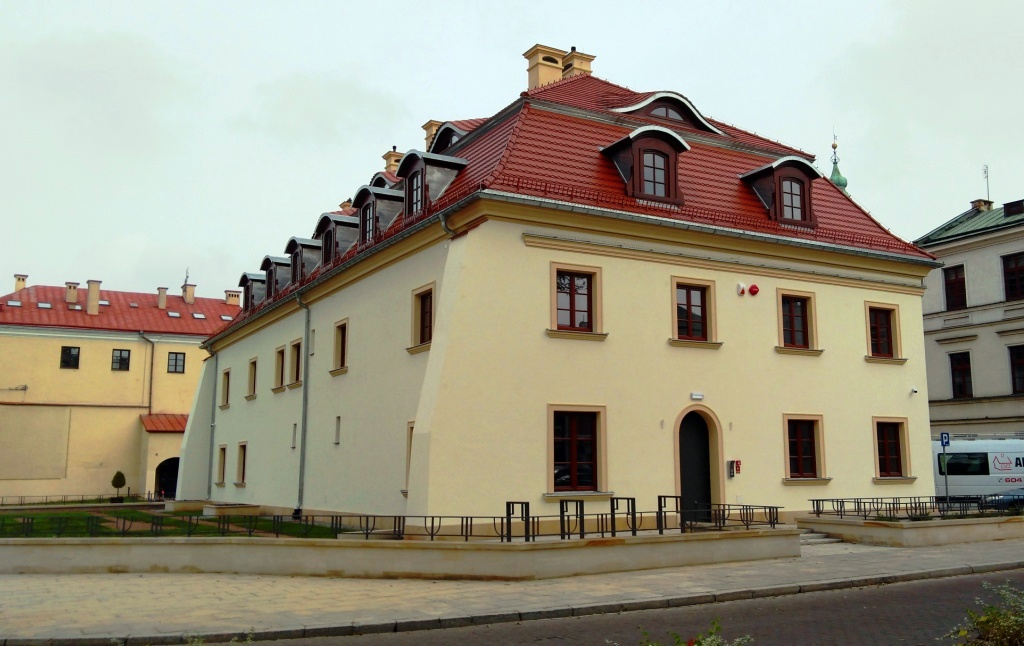
- Established: 1987
- Location: ul. Kolegiacka 1a, Zamość, Poland
- Coordinates: 50°42′58″N 23°15′02″E

The Sacred Museum of the Zamość Cathedral (formerly the Collegiate Church Museum, the Zamoyski Family Foundation) - is a museum based in Zamość, Poland. The facility operates at the Cathedral of the Resurrection and St. Thomas the Apostle, Zamość, and its headquarters is the ground floor of a former prelate building, dating from the late 16th century.

The museum was opened in March 1987, thanks to the efforts of the last head of the Zamoyski Family Fee Tail, Jan Tomasz Zamoyski. As part of the museum exhibition you can see monuments of sacred art from the treasury of the cathedral, including:

- The coronation alb of King Michał Korybut Wiśniowiecki,
- liturgical vestments - the oldest from the 16th and 17th centuries,
- liturgical vessels, reliquaries, votive offerings and church books,
- portraits of Prelates and Zamoyski headwinders, including coffin portraits.

Following renovation and conservation work in 2018-2019 covering both buildings (the Infułatka and the Vicarage), from 2020 the museum will consist of two main expositions occupying the aforementioned two historic buildings: the Vicarage (3 Kolegiacka St.) houses the "Treasury of History, Art and Science" exhibition, while the Infułatka (1a Kolegiacka St.) is dedicated to the "Fabrica Ecclesiace museum of technology and architecture" exhibition.
