= Zdzisław Jan Zamoyski =

Polish nobleman

- Coat of arms: Jelita
- Born: c. 1591
- Died: 1670
- Noble family: Zamoyski
- Consort: Anna Zofia Lanckorońska
- Father: Jan Zamoyski
- Mother: Anna Wiśniowiecka

Zdzisław Jan Zamoyski (c. 1591–1670) was a Polish nobleman (szlachcic). He became Podstoli of Lwów in 1646 and castellan of Czerniechów in 1656.

He married Anna Zofia Lanckorońska and had five children: Marianna Zamoyska, Mikołaj Zamoyski, Eufrozyna Zamoyska, Marcin Zamoyski and Jan Kazimierz Zamoyski.
