= Marcin Zamoyski =

Polish nobleman (c. 1637 – 1689)

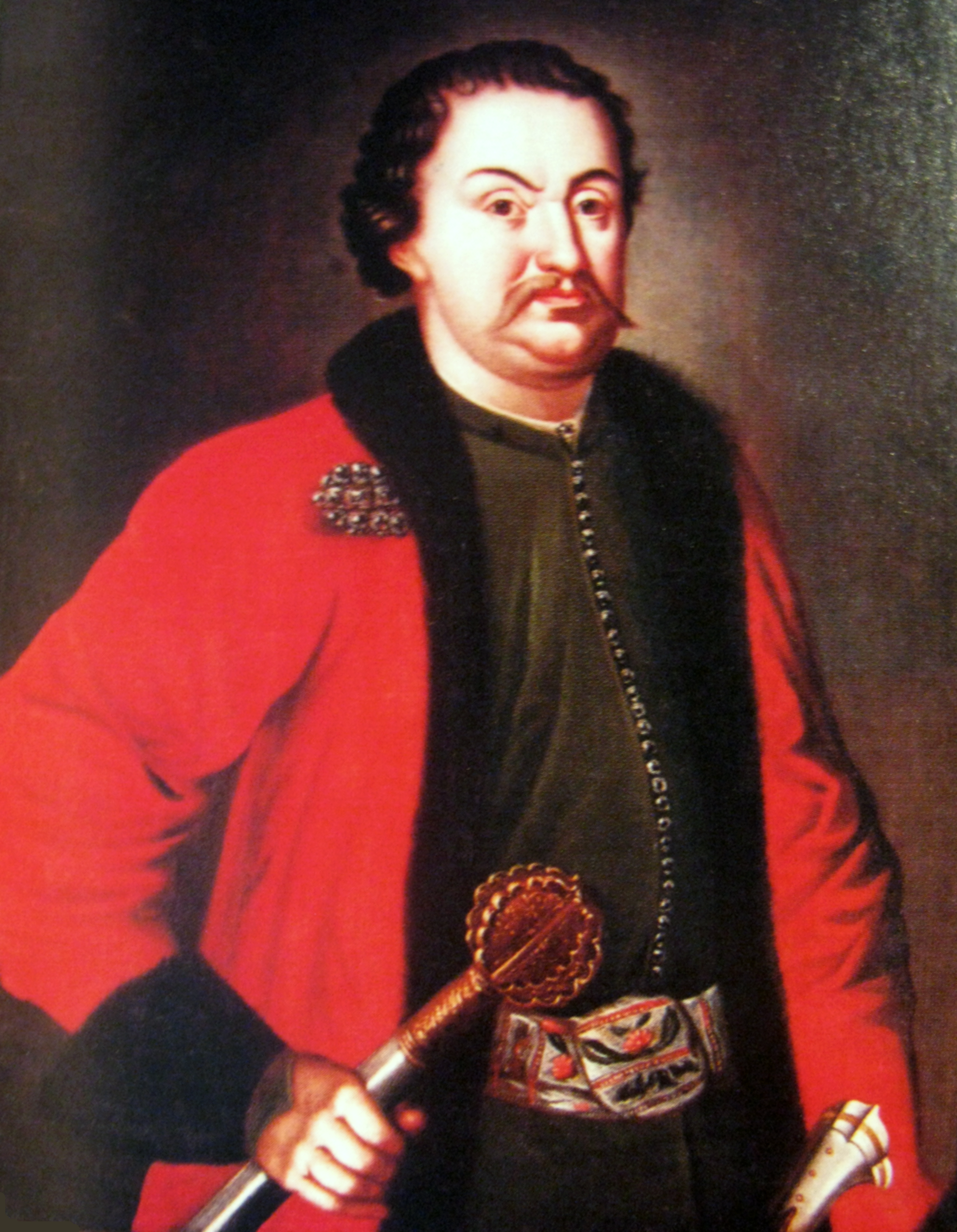
- Coat of arms: Jelita
- Born: c. 1637
- Died: 1689
- Family: Zamoyski
- Consort: Anna Franciszka Gnińska
- Issue: Marianna Teresa Zamoyska; Tomasz Józef Zamoyski; Jan Franciszek Zamoyski; Michał Zdzisław Zamoyski; Marcin Leopold Zamoyski
- Father: Zdzisław Jan Zamoyski
- Mother: Anna Zofia Lanckorońska

Marcin Zamoyski (c. 1637 – 1689) was a Polish nobleman (szlachcic).

Marcin became the fourth ordynat of Zamość estate in 1674. He became a royal rotmistrz in 1656, podstoli of Lwów in 1677, voivode of Bracław Voivodeship in 1678, voivode of Lublin Voivodeship in 1682, and Grand Treasurer of the Crown in 1685. He was starost of Belz, Płoskirów, Bolimów and Rostoki.
