= Adam Zamoyski =

British-Polish historian and author (born 1949)

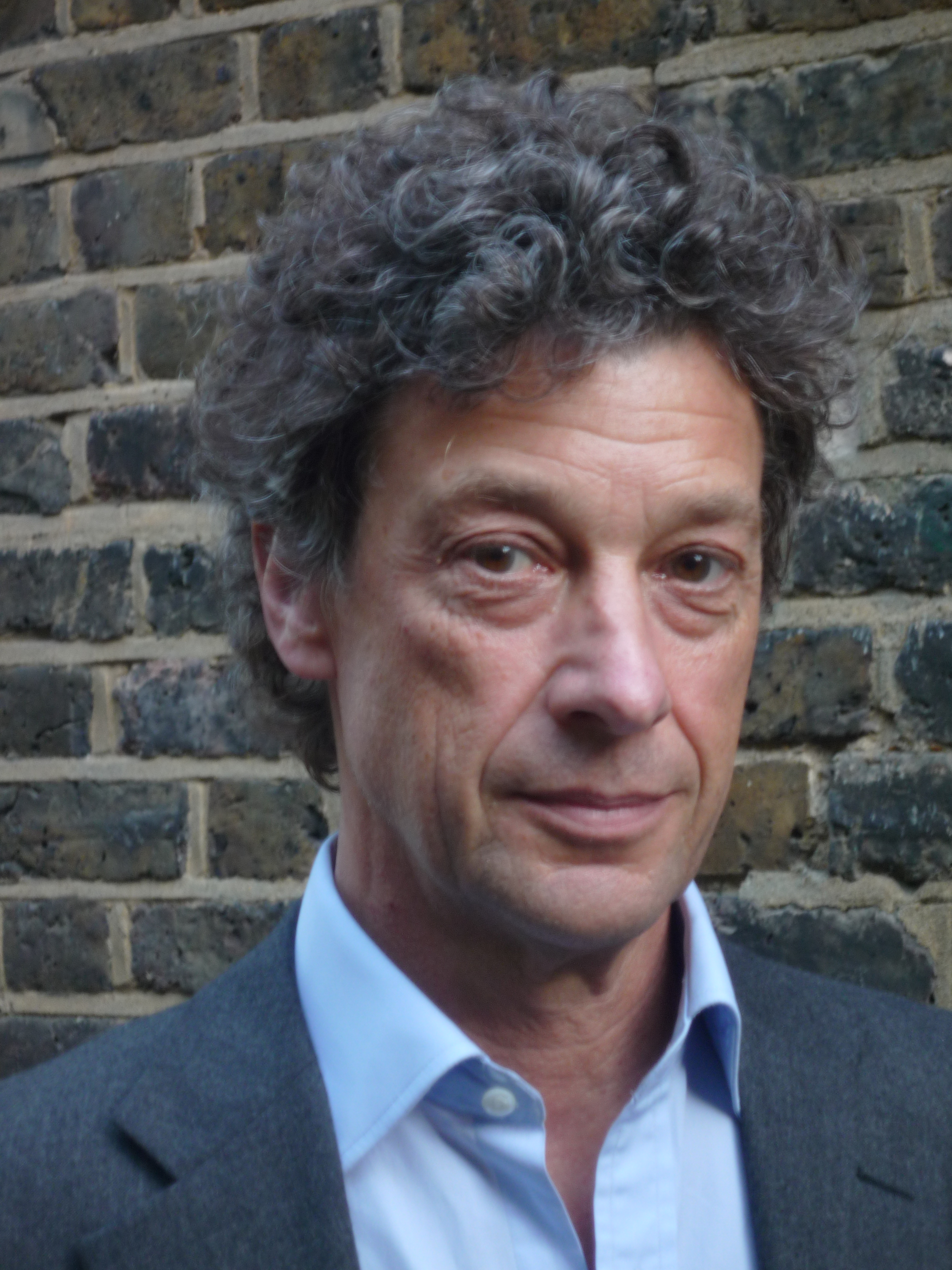
- Zamoyski in 2009
- Born: Adam Stefan Zamoyski; 11 January 1949 (age 77); New York City, United States
- Occupations: Historian, author
- Spouse: Emma Sergeant (m. 2001)
- Parents: Count Stefan Adam Zamoyski (father); Princess Elżbieta Czartoryska (mother)
- Family: Zamoyski

Adam Zamoyski (born 11 January 1949) is a Polish-British historian and author.

== Personal life ==
Born in New York City in 1949, as Adam Stefan Zamoyski, the youngest son of Count Stefan Zamoyski (1904–1976), member of the Zamoyski family and his wife, Princess Elizabeth Czartoryska (1905–1989), who left their homeland when it was invaded by Germany in 1939. When the Soviets took power at the end of World War II, they found themselves stranded in the West, eventually settling in London.

Zamoyski has dual Polish-British nationality. He was brought up in England and educated at St Philip's Preparatory School, Downside School, The Queen's College, Oxford, where he read History and Modern Languages.

Zamoyski lives in London with his wife, the painter Emma Sergeant. He has a second home in Poland.

== Career ==
Zamoyski is a historian and author of numerous books including a history of Poland, The Polish Way, and Moscow 1812: Napoleon's Fatal March, an account of Napoleon's invasion of Russia in 1812. His biography of Frédéric Chopin, Chopin. Prince of the Romantics, was serialised as the 'Book of the Week' on BBC Radio 4 in 2012. His books have been translated into more than a dozen languages.

== Books ==
- — (1979). Chopin: A Biography. London: Collins. ISBN 0-00-216089-7.
  - — (1980). Chopin: A New Biography (1st USA ed.). Garden City, N.Y.: Doubleday. ISBN 0-385-13597-1.
  - — (2010). Chopin: Prince of the Romantics (revised ed.). London: HarperCollins. ISBN 978-0-00-735182-4.
- — (1981). The Battle for the Marchlands: A History of the 1920 Polish-Soviet War. Boulder: East European Monographs.
- — (1982). Paderewski. A Biography. London: Collins.
- — (1987). The Polish Way: A Thousand-Year History of the Poles and Their Culture. London: John Murray.
- — (1992). The Last King of Poland. London: Jonathan Cape. (reprinted Weidenfeld & Nicolson, 1997)
- — (1995). The Forgotten Few: The Polish Air Force in the Second World War. London: John Murray.
- — (1999). Holy Madness: Romantics, Patriots and Revolutionaries 1776–1871. London: Weidenfeld & Nicolson.
- — (2001). Poland: A Traveller's Gazetteer. London: John Murray.
- — (2001). The Czartoryski Museum. London: Azimuth Editions.
- — (2004). Moscow 1812: Napoleon's Fatal March on Moscow. New York: HarperCollins.
- — (2007). Rites of Peace: The Fall of Napoleon & the Congress of Vienna. London: HarperCollins. ISBN 9780060775186.
- — (2008). Warsaw 1920: Lenin's Failed Conquest of Europe. London: HarperCollins.
- — (2009). Poland: A History. London: HarperPress.
- — (2014). Phantom Terror: The Threat of Revolution and the Repression of Liberty 1789–1848. London: William Collins.
- — (2018). Napoleon: The Man Behind the Myth. London: William Collins.
- — (2024). Izabela the Valiant: The Story of an Indomitable Polish Princess. London: William Collins.

== Contributions and other publications ==
- Sienkiewicz, Henryk (1990). Charcoal Sketches and Other Tales. Translated by Adam Zamoyski. London: Angel Books. ISBN 978-0-946162-32-1.
- — (2018). Napoleon. All You Need to Know ... London: Connell Publishing. ISBN 978-1-912568-01-7.

== See also ==
- List of Polish people
