= Moscow 1812: Napoleon's Fatal March =

Moscow 1812: Napoleon's fatal march
- Book cover
- Author: Adam Zamoyski
- Language: English
- Subject: French invasion of Russia
- Genre: War, History
- Publisher: HarperCollins
- Publication date: August 3, 2004
- Publication place: United States
- Media type: Print (hardcover)
- Pages: 672
- ISBN: 0-06-107558-2
- OCLC: 55067008
- Dewey Decimal: 940.2/742/0947 22
- LC Class: DC235 .Z35 2004

Moscow 1812: Napoleon's Fatal March is a non-fiction book analysing the events and circumstances during the French Invasion of Russia and the events during the reign of Napoleon, which would, ultimately, mark the beginning of the end of the Napoleonic empire after his troops were driven from Russia. The book was written by Adam Zamoyski and first published on August 3, 2004 by HarperCollins; receiving positive reviews by critics and the media.

== Plot ==
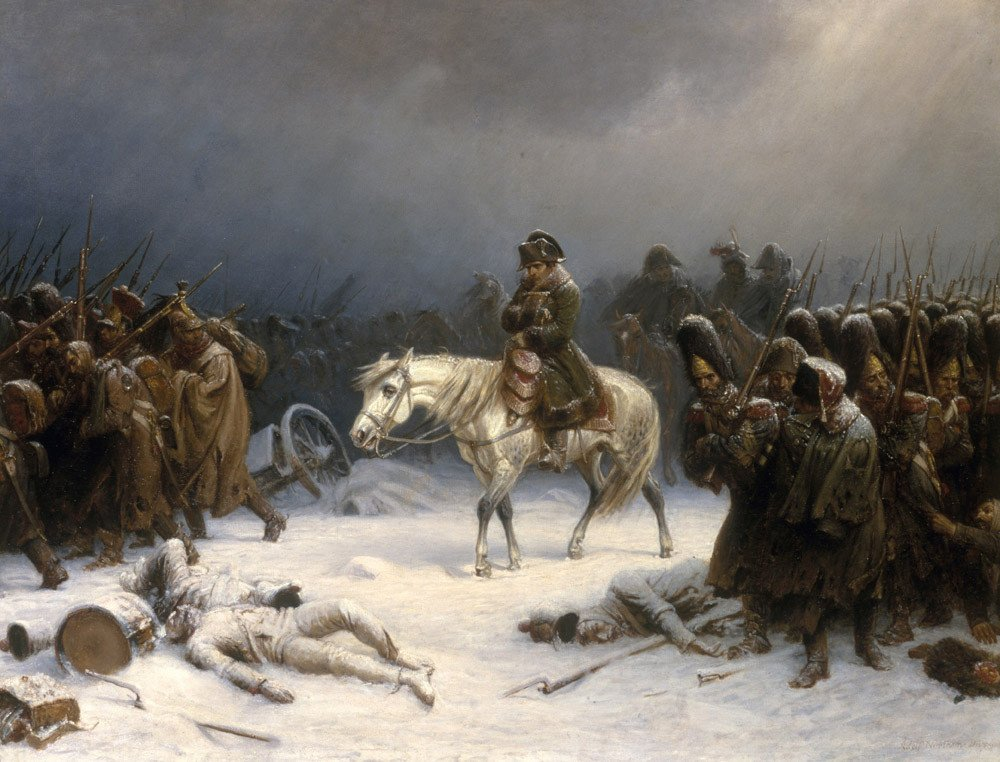
An artistic depiction of Napoleon's retreat from Moscow, by Adolph Northen

Napoleon I of France was, at the time, a very prominent military and political figure, desiring to create a French-governed Europe. He succeeded in annexing many countries to France, placing his relatives and friends as monarchs in those countries. He managed to subdue Prussia and force her to become his ally, and to a great extent did the same to Austria. After winning a war with Russia, he made even the Russian Tsar Alexander I (1801) his ally. Only two countries in Europe still resisted France's attempt at domination: United Kingdom and Spain. He failed when attempting to invade Britain and destroy it via a constant blockade. After the execution of the Duc d'Enghien, however, Tzar Alexander began to hate and detest Napoleon, and began to cooperate with the United Kingdom, disrupting the continental blockade.

Napoleon decided then to wage war on Russia, in order to get her back as a French ally. In June 1812, the French invaded Russia on Napoleon's orders, making their way east towards Moscow, suffering large losses caused by lack of food, desertion, disease, exhaustion and battles. Napoleon eventually "conquered" Moscow, only to see the deserted city being set on fire by the Russians themselves, on the order of their commanders. After staying too long in the scorched city, Napoleon finally decided to march back, suffering enormous losses caused by harassment by the Russian troops, the disastrous battle at the crossing of the Berezina river, and agonizing cold (down to minus 30 degree Celsius).

Napoleon's army of more than 500,000 soldiers was annihilated, thus marking a turning point in world affairs and events around the world.

== Reception ==
The Washington Post reviewer Anne Applebaum commented: "Certain historical events become so covered in myth and significance, so overlaid with patriotism and emotion, that over time many people forget what really happened and why. Napoleon's fatal 1812 march on Moscow is one such event." HarperCollins commented that "Moscow 1812 is a masterful work of history;" as well as being "dramatic, insightful, and enormously absorbing." Michael Burleigh of The Sunday Times wrote "Adam Zamoyski's account of the 1812 campaign is so brilliant that it is impossible to put aside."
