= Jan Zamoyski (died 1619) =

Polish nobleman

- Coat of arms: Jelita
- Born: 16th century
- Died: 1619
- Noble family: Zamoyski
- Consort: Anna Wiśniowiecka
- Father: Jan Zamoyski
- Mother: (?) Gorzkowska

Jan Zamoyski (died 1619) was a Polish nobleman (szlachcic).

Jan became a Royal Rotmistrz and Deputy Guard of Kresy in 1588, Guard of the Crown in 1600 and castellan of Chełm in 1604.

He was married to Anna Wiśniowiecka and had six children: Jerzy Zamoyski, Maurycy Zamoyski, Zdzisław Jan Zamoyski, Aleksander Zamoyski, Jan Zamoyski and Helena Zamoyska.
