= Michał Zdzisław Zamoyski =

Polish nobleman

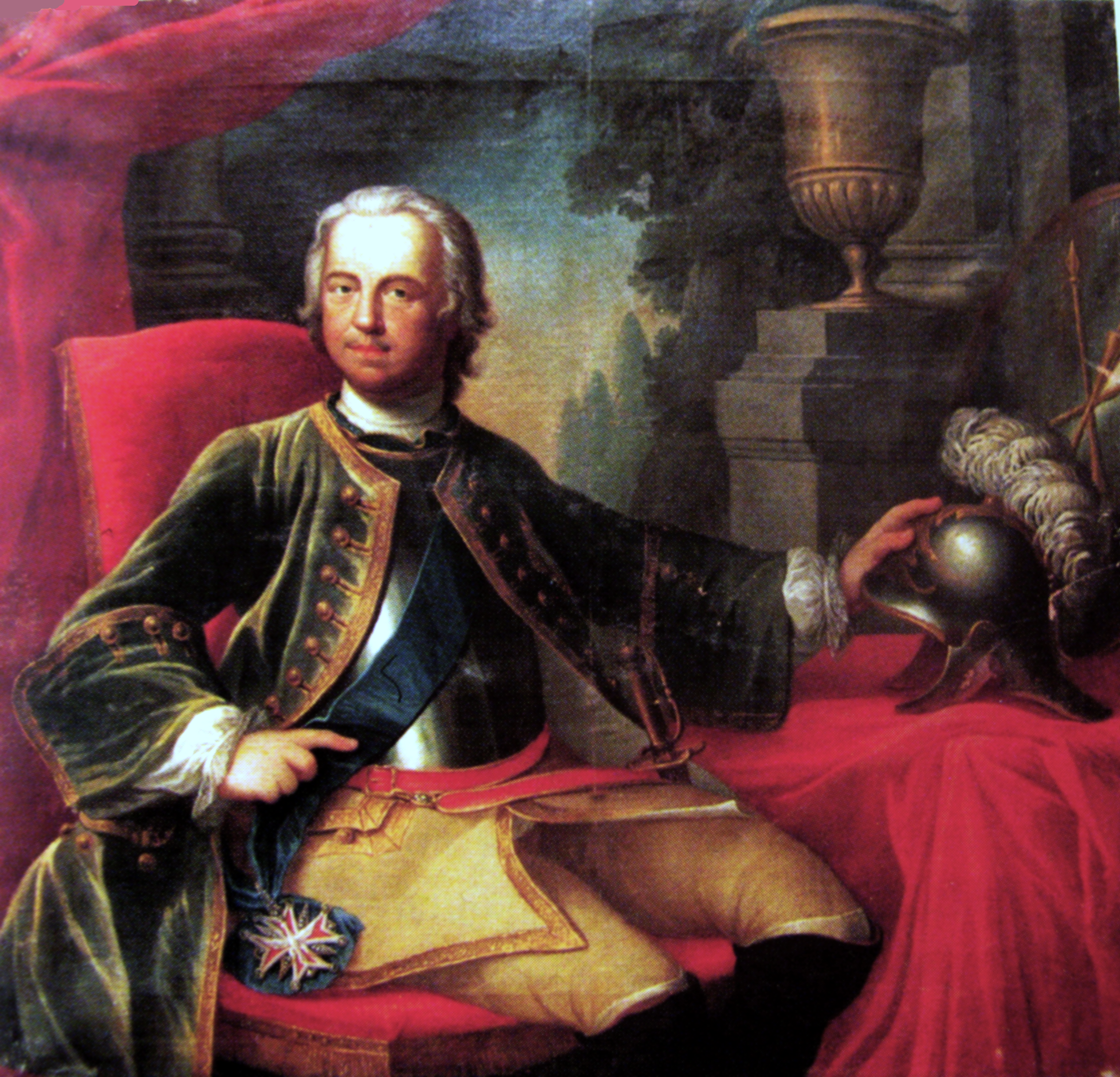
- Coat of arms: Jelita
- Born: 1679
- Died: 7 March 1735
- Family: Zamoyski
- Consort: Anna Działyńska; Elżbieta Wiśniowiecka
- Issue: with Anna Działyńska; Ludwika Zamoyska; Anna Teresa Zamoyska; Helena Zamoyska; Tomasz Antoni Zamoyski; Jan Jakub Zamoyski; Andrzej Hieronim Zamoyski
- Father: Marcin Zamoyski
- Mother: Anna Franciszka Gnińska

Michał Zdzisław Zamoyski (1679–1735) was a Polish nobleman (szlachcic).

Michał became the 6th Ordynat of Zamość estate. He was Great Łowczy of the Crown since 1714, voivode of Smolensk Voivodeship since 1732 and starost of Gniew, Bratian, Lębork, Bolemów. He became Knight of the Order of the White Eagle, awarded on 3 August 1732.
