= Klemens Zamoyski =

Polish nobleman

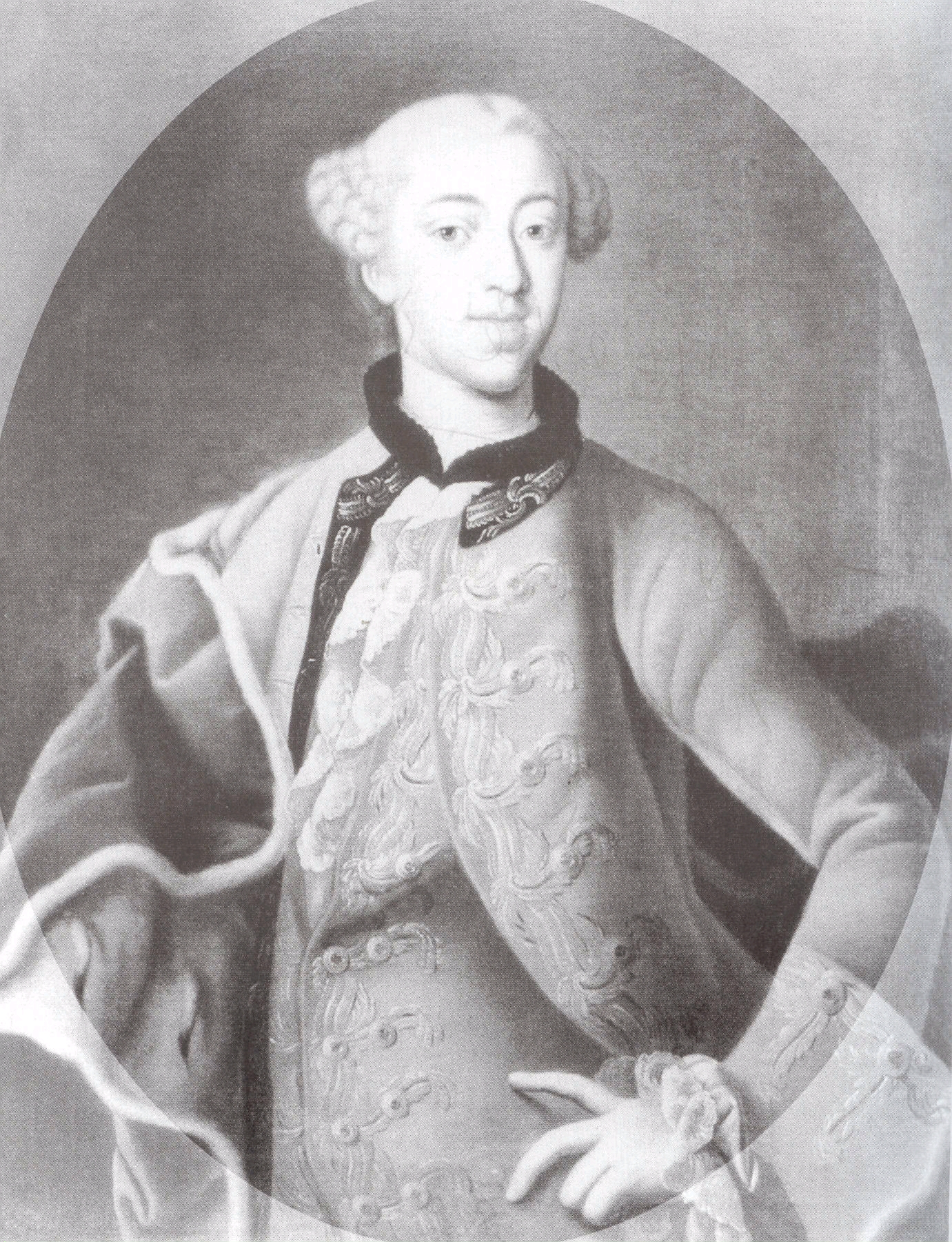
- Coat of arms: Jelita
- Born: 1738
- Died: 1767 (aged 28–29); Zamość
- Family: Zamoyski
- Consort: Konstancja Czartoryska
- Father: Tomasz Antoni Zamoyski
- Mother: Anna Teresa Michowska

Klemens Zamoyski (1738 (Note: Some older sources incorrectly date his birth to 1747)–1767) was a Polish nobleman (szlachcic).

Klemens was the 8th Ordynat of Zamość estate, starost of Płoskirów and Tarnów.
