= Tomasz Józef Zamoyski =

Polish nobleman (1678–1725)

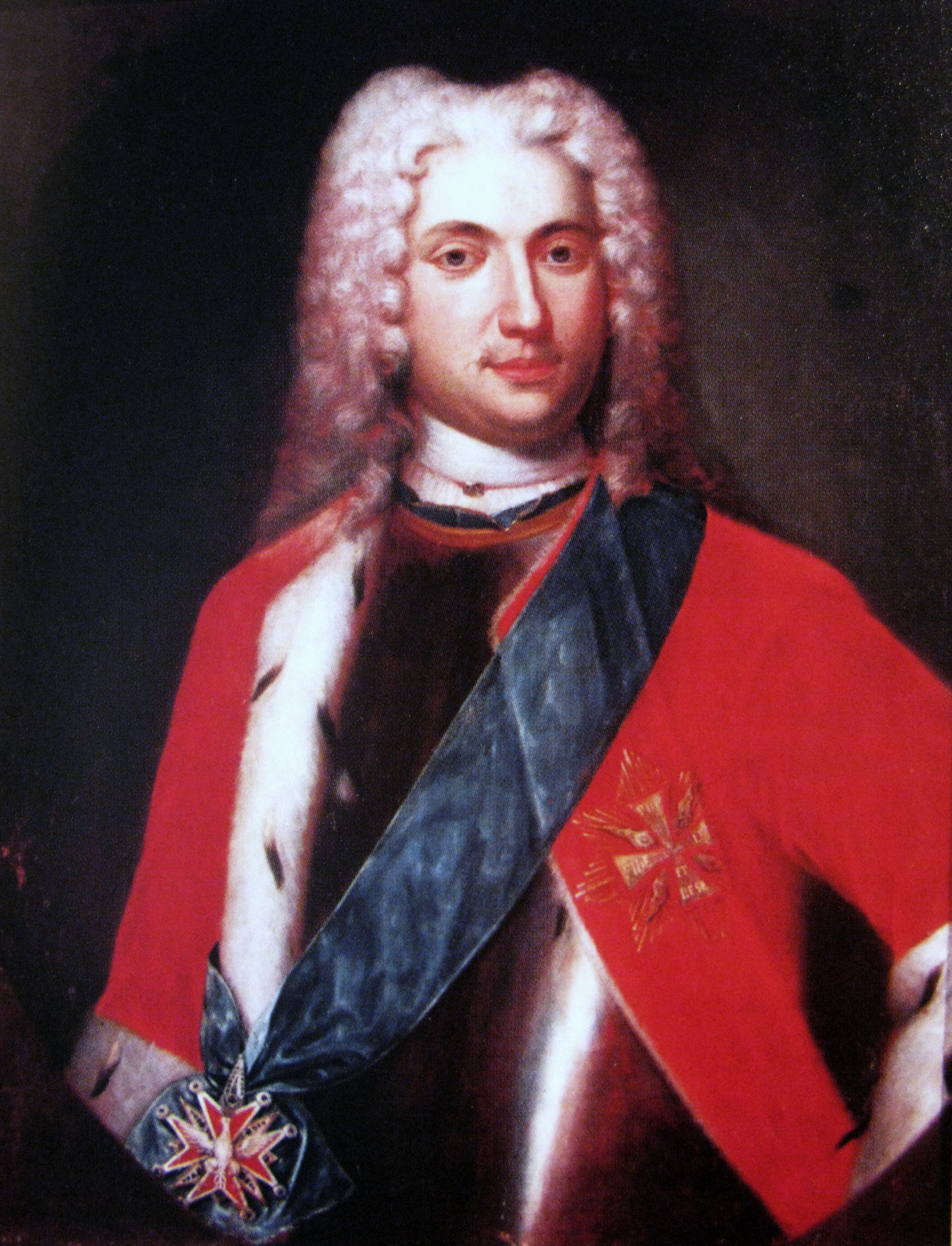
- Coat of arms: Jelita
- Born: 1678; Zamość
- Died: 26 December 1725 (aged 46–47)
- Noble family: Zamoyski
- Consorts: Teresa Potocka; Antonina Zahorowska
- Father: Marcin Zamoyski
- Mother: Anna Franciszka Gnińska

Tomasz Józef Zamoyski (1678–1725) was a Polish nobleman (szlachcic).

Tomasz became the 5th ordynat of Zamość estate. He was also starost of Płoskirów and Gródek and became a Royal Colonel. Zamoyski was painted by Louis de Silvestre and the portrait is now in the Zamosc Museum.
