= Feliks Łojko-Rędziejowski =

Polish nobleman and diplomat

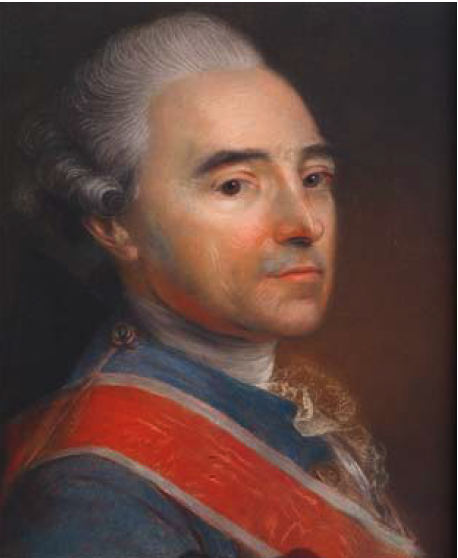

Feliks (Felicjan) Franciszek Łoyko-Rędziejowski (1717 – 19 May 1779) was a Polish nobleman, diplomat, political writer, lawyer and economist as well as a confidant of Stanislaus Augustus, supporter of the Polish Enlightenment and from 1766 onwards Poland's ambassador to the Kingdom of France. He was also known as Eleuthère Patridophile, 'Gentil-homme de la Grande-Pologne', 'Gentil-homme polonois' and 'Patridophilis Eleutherus'. He was born in Grzybów and died in Warsaw.

== Sources ==
- Łoyko's manuscripts on Polona.pl
