= Aleksander August Zamoyski =

Polish nobleman

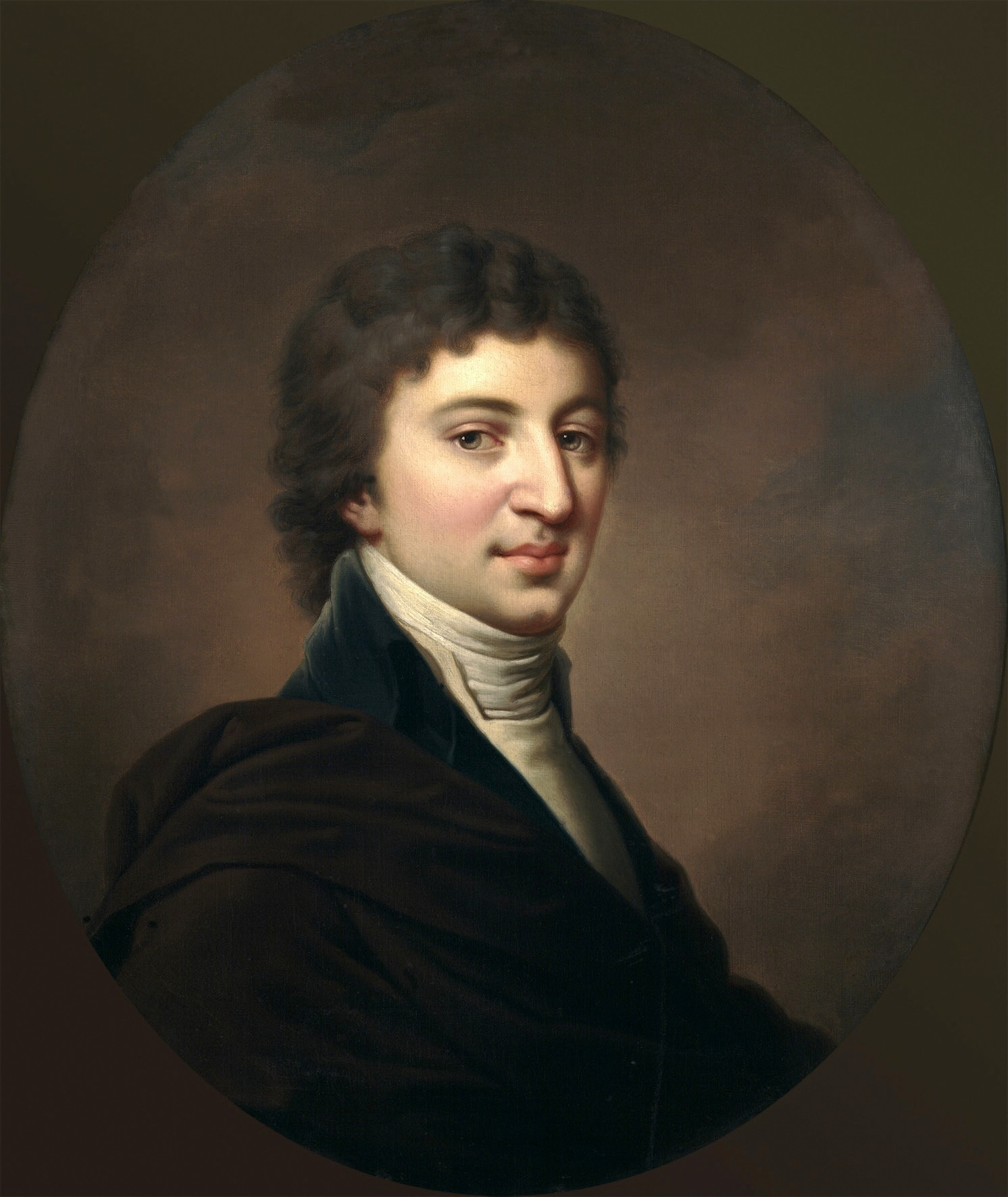
- Coat of arms: Jelita
- Born: 1770; Warsaw
- Died: 6 December 1800
- Family: Zamoyski
- Wife: Marianna Gronowska
- Father: Andrzej Zamoyski
- Mother: Konstancja Czartoryska (1742–1797)

Count Aleksander August Zamoyski (1770 - 6 December 1800) was a Polish nobleman (szlachcic).

Aleksander became the 11th Ordynat of Zamość estate. He died childless.
