= Tomasz Antoni Zamoyski =

Polish nobleman

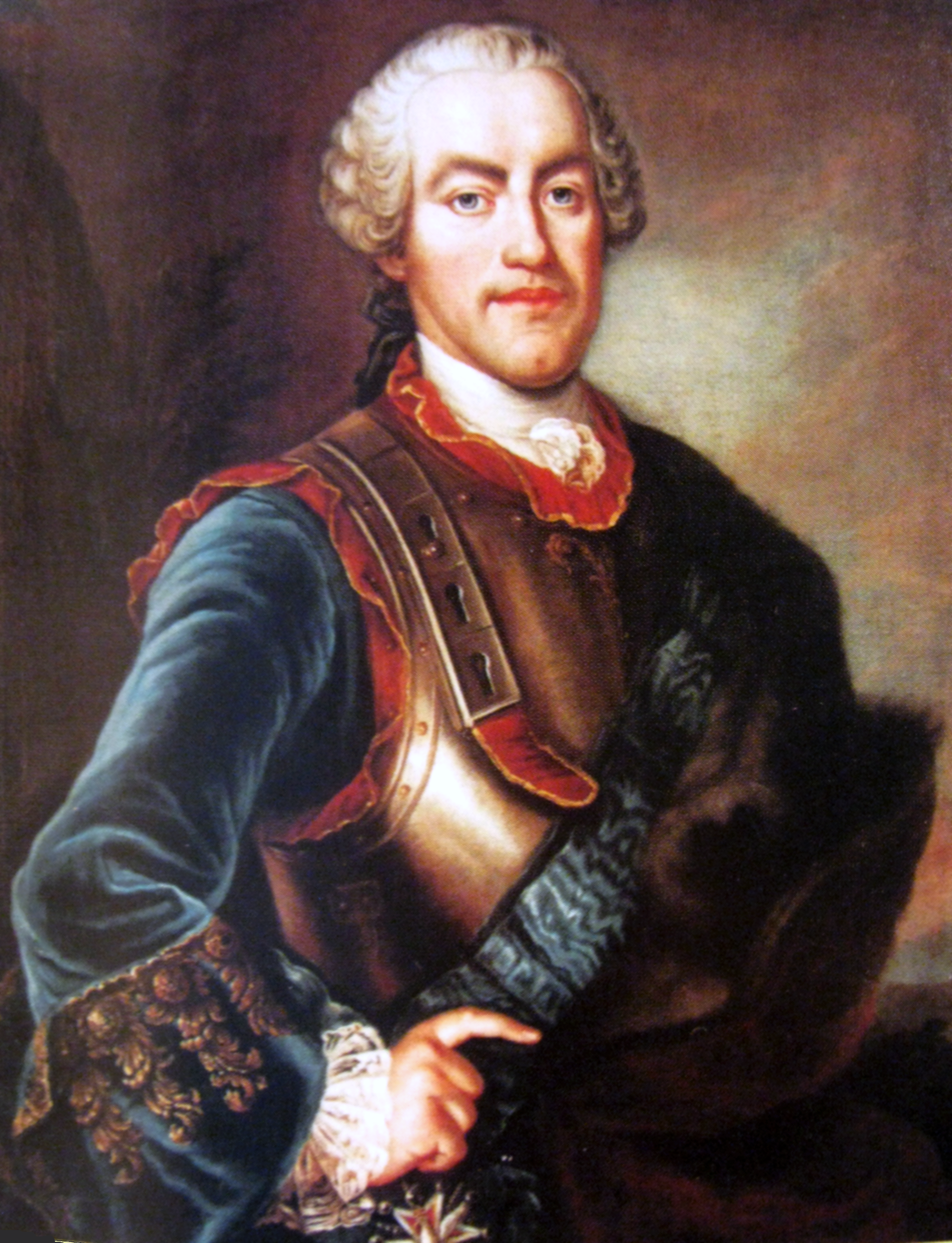
- Coat of arms: Jelita
- Born: 13 June 1707
- Died: 1752 (aged 44–45)
- Noble family: Zamoyski
- Spouses: Marianna Lubienska; Aniela Teresa Michowska
- Issue: Klemens Zamoyski
- Father: Michał Zdzisław Zamoyski
- Mother: Anna Działyńska

Tomasz Antoni Zamoyski (1707–1752) was a Polish nobleman (szlachcic) who served as the voivode (governor) of Lublin Voivodeship.

== Political career ==
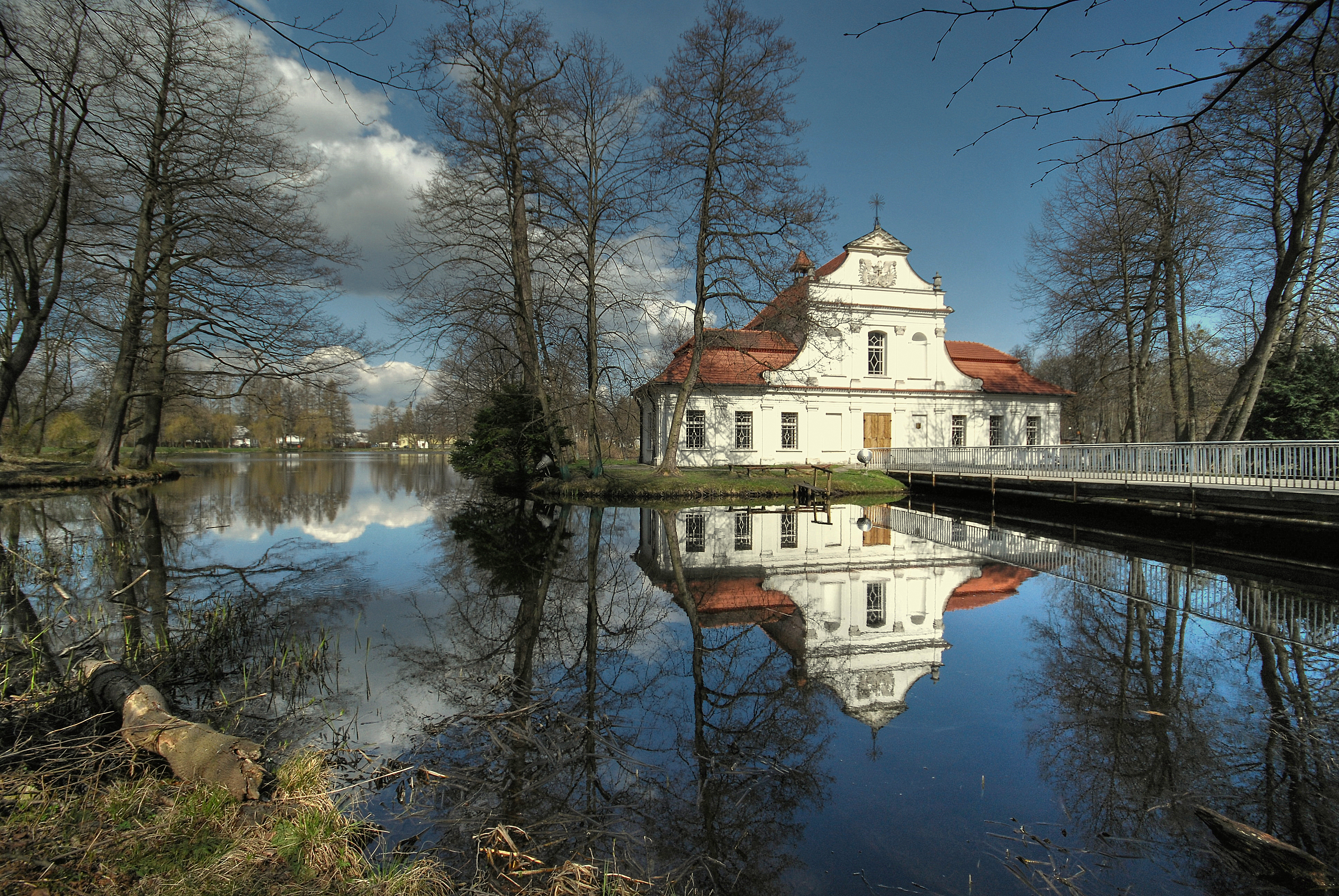
St. John of Nepomuk Church in Zwierzyniec

In 1733, he supported the election of Stanisław Leszczyński to the Polish throne. In 1735, after the death of his father, he became the 7th Ordynat of Zamość estate. In 1738, he was elected envoy to the Sejm. In 1744, he was appointed the voivode (governor) of Lublin Voivodeship.

In 1741, he founded the St. John of Nepomuk Church in Zwierzyniec. He was awarded the Knight of the Order of the White Eagle on 3 August 1746.

== Personal life ==
He was married to Marianna Lubienska and Aniela Teresa Michowska. He had one child with Michowska, Klemens Zamoyski.

== See also ==
- Lublin Voivode
