= Jan Tomasz Zamoyski =

Polish political activist

- Born: 12 June 1912; Klemensów, Congress Poland, Russian Empire
- Died: 29 June 2002 (aged 90); Warsaw, Poland
- Spouse: Róża z Żółtowskich
- Children: Marcin Zamoyski; Maria Ponińska
- Parent(s): Maurycy Zamoyski; Maria Róża z Sapiehów

Jan Tomasz Zamoyski (12 June 1912 in Klemensów – 29 June 2002 in Warsaw) was a Polish political activist. He was the 16th and last Ordynat of the Zamoyski Family Fee Tail, a senator (1991–1993), and the president of the National-Democratic Party (since 1991). He was awarded the Order of the White Eagle.

His efforts lead to the establishment of the Sacred Museum of the Zamość Cathedral in 1987.

After the collapse of the communist regime in 1989 he served as a member of the Senate of Poland in the Third Republic of Poland.
