= Andrzej Hieronim Zamoyski =

Polish noble (1716–1792)

Andrzej Zamoyski
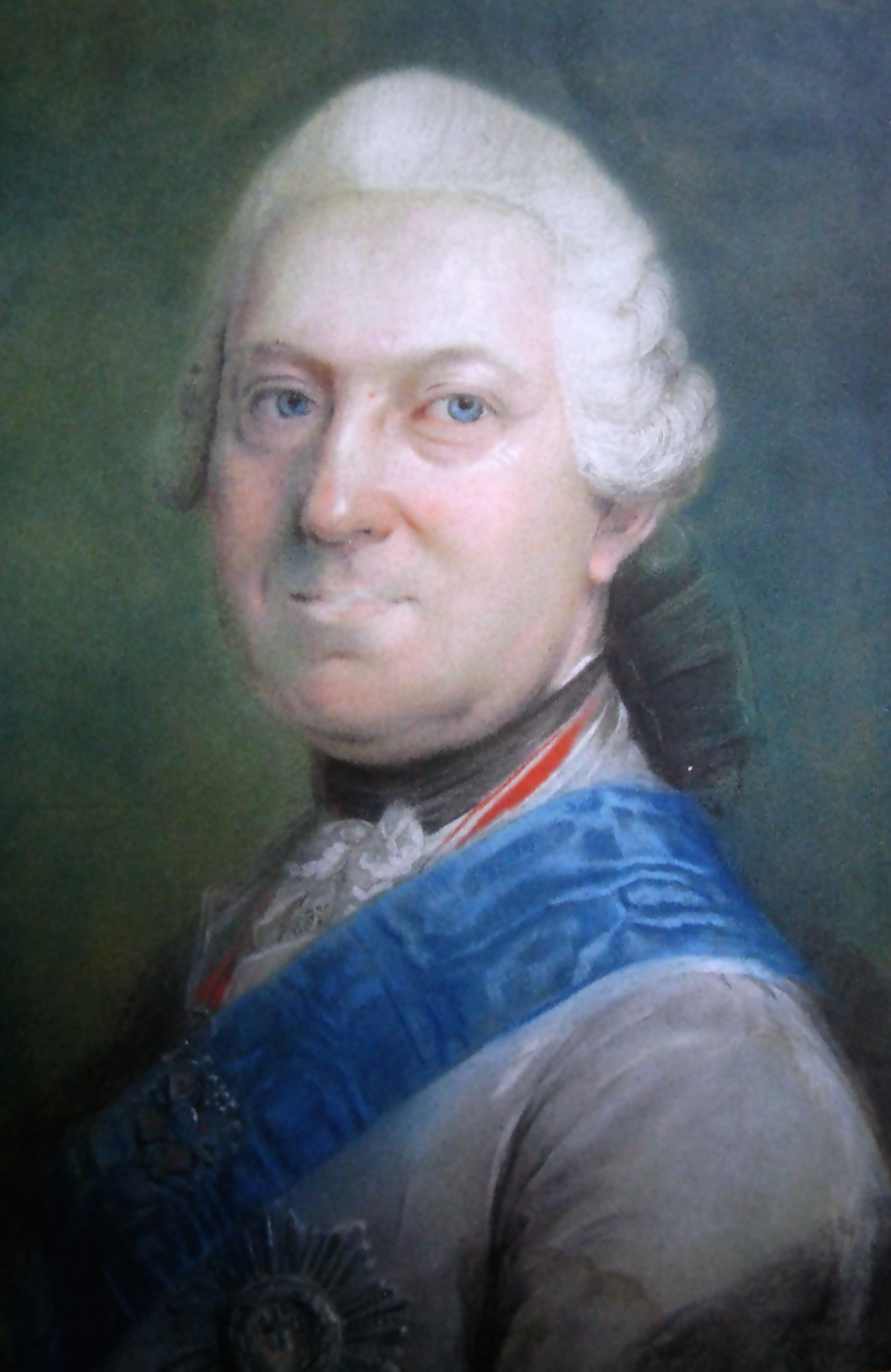
- Anonymous portrait
- Full name: Andrzej Hieronim Franciszek Zamoyski
- Born: 12 February 1716; Bieżuń, Poland
- Died: 10 February 1792 (aged 75); Zamość, Poland
- Noble family: Zamoyski
- Spouse: Konstancja Czartoryska
- Issue: with Konstancja Czartoryska; Aleksander August Zamoyski; Stanisław Kostka Zamoyski; Anna Zamoyska
- Father: Michał Zdzisław Zamoyski
- Mother: Anna Działyńska

Count Andrzej Hieronim Franciszek Zamoyski (12 February 1716 – 10 February 1792) was a Polish noble (szlachcic). Knight of the Order of the White Eagle, awarded on 3 August 1758 in Warsaw.

He was the 10th Ordynat of the Zamość Ordynacja properties. Between 1757 and 1764 voivode of the Inowrocław Voivodeship. From 1764 until 1767 Great Crown Chancellor and starost of Halicz, Lublin, Brodnica and Rostoki.

He married Princess Konstancja Czartoryska in Warsaw in 1768, the daughter of Prince Stanisław Kostka Czartoryski and sister of Prince Józef Klemens Czartoryski's.

In 1760 he was the first of the Polish magnates to replace serfdom on his estates. King Stanisław II Augustus and the Polish Sejm commissioned him in 1776 to produce a new legal code for Poland, which became known as the Zamoyski Code. By 1780, under Zamoyski's direction, a code (Zbiór praw sądowych) had been produced. It would have strengthened royal power, made all officials answerable to the Sejm, placed the clergy and their finances under state supervision, and deprived landless szlachta ("barefoot szlachta") of many of their legal immunities. Zamoyski's progressive legal code, containing elements of constitutional reform, failed to be adopted by the Sejm.

== Remembrance ==
He is one of the figures immortalized in Jan Matejko's 1891 painting, Constitution of May 3, 1791.
