= Zamoyski family =

Polish noble family

Coat of Arms of the Counts Zamoyski

Possessions of Zamoyski family are marked in green

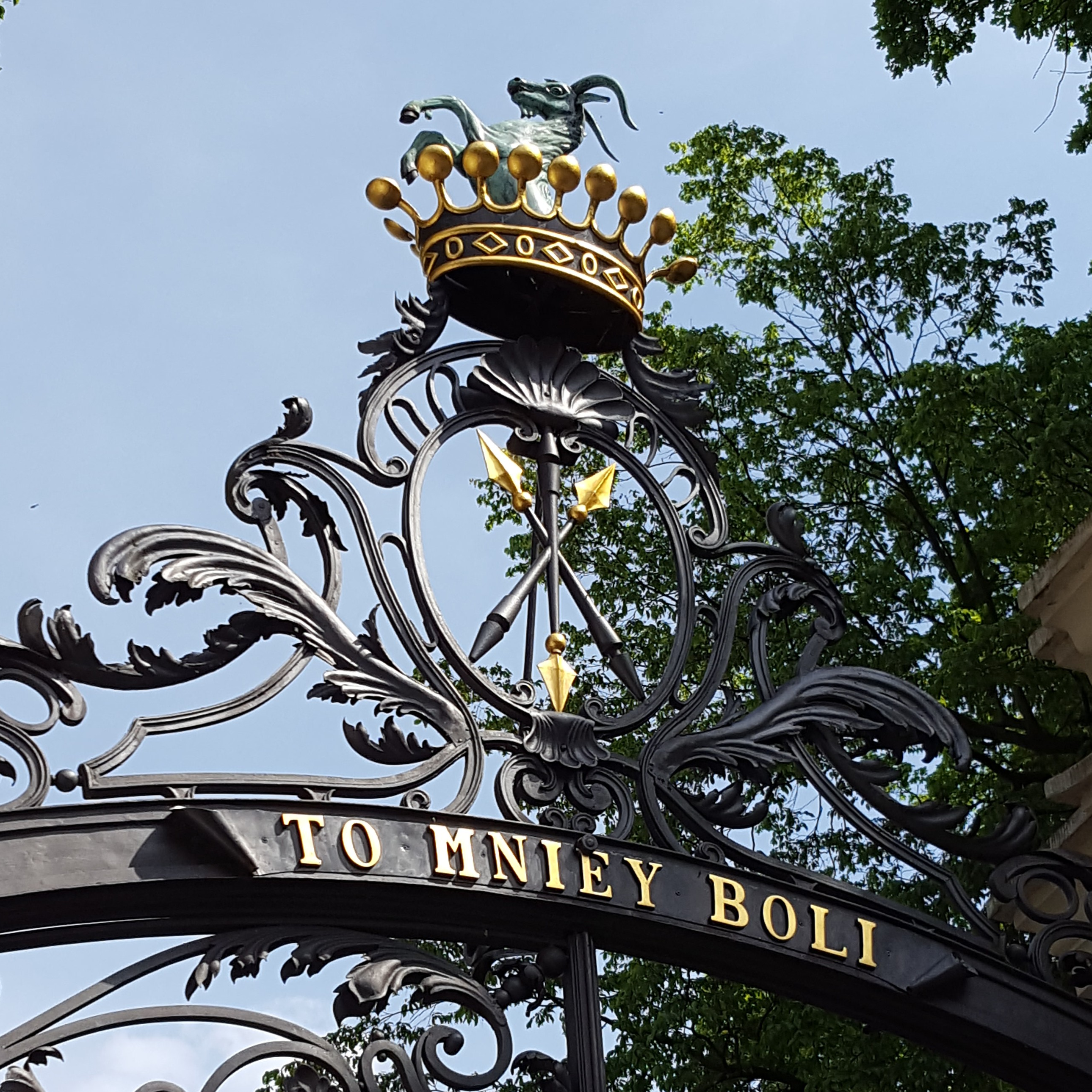
Coat of arms at the main gate of Kozłówka Palace

The House of Zamoyski (plural: Zamoyscy) is an important Polish noble (szlachta) family belonging to the category of Polish magnates. They used the Jelita coat of arms. The surname "Zamoyski" literally means "of/from Zamość" and reflects the fact that the family originally were lords of Zamość, according to a tradition of surnames of Polish nobility. The family was influential in Polish politics for several centuries, and its members held various official titles, including those of Count and Countess.

== History ==
The family traces its origins to the Łaźniński family. In the 15th century, Tomasz Łaźniński bought an estate in Stary (Old) Zamość. His sons Florian (died 1510) and Maciej assumed the name Zamoyski, and the family began to rise in prominence. Florian’s grandson Stanisław was the castellan of Chełm, and his son, Jan Zamoyski, arguably the most famous member of the family, became a chancellor, hetman, and founded the Zamoyski's Ordynat - a large estate that was a major source of the family's wealth. He was the 1st Ordynat of the Zamoyski Family Fee Tail. His son, Tomasz Zamoyski, the 2nd Ordynat, was also a chancellor in Poland. Many of their descendants held important positions within the Polish–Lithuanian Commonwealth, often that of a voivode.

In the 18th century, the 10th Ordynat, Andrzej Zamoyski, became the third chancellor of Poland in the family's history. He was one of the authors of a plan for general reform of the nation, known as Zamoyski Code. The family received the title of count from the Holy Roman Emperor in the late 18th century. Brothers Andrzej Artur Zamoyski and Władysław Stanisław Zamoyski, supported Polish movements aimed at regaining independence during the partitions period; Władysław was exiled after participating in the November Uprising, and Andrzej, in the aftermath of the January Uprising.

Andrzej's grandson, Maurycy Zamoyski, was a Minister of Foreign Affairs in the Second Polish Republic for seven months in 1924.

== Notable members ==
- Jan Zamoyski (1542–1605), Great Crown Chancellor and Great Crown Hetman
- Tomasz Zamoyski (1594–1638), Vice-Chancellor of the Crown
- Gryzelda Konstancja Zamoyska (1623–1672), mother of King Michał Korybut Wiśniowiecki
- Jan "Sobiepan" Zamoyski (1627–1662), magnate, voivode
- Andrzej Zamoyski (1716–1792), Great Crown Chancellor, humanist and reformer
- Władysław Stanisław Zamoyski (1803–1868), politician, general, activist of Hôtel Lambert
- Andrzej Artur Zamoyski (1800–1874), political and economic activist
- Maurycy Zamoyski (1871–1939), Minister of Foreign Affairs of Poland
- Andrzej Przemysław Zamoyski (1852–1927), landowner
- Jan Kanty Zamoyski (1900–1961), landowner
- Jan Tomasz Zamoyski (1912–2002), Polish Armed Forces and Home Army soldier, Polish Senator, the last Ordynat of Zamość estate
- Marcin Zamoyski (born 1947), Mayor of Zamość (1990–92, 2002-2014)
- Count Adam Zamoyski (born 1949), historian
- Michael Bisping former UFC fighter. Michael is the great-grandson of Countess Marie Josepha Zamoyska (1887–1961), who in turn was the daughter of Count Andrzej Przemysław Zamoyski and his wife Princess Maria Carolina of Bourbon-Two Sicilies (1856–1941)

== Residences ==
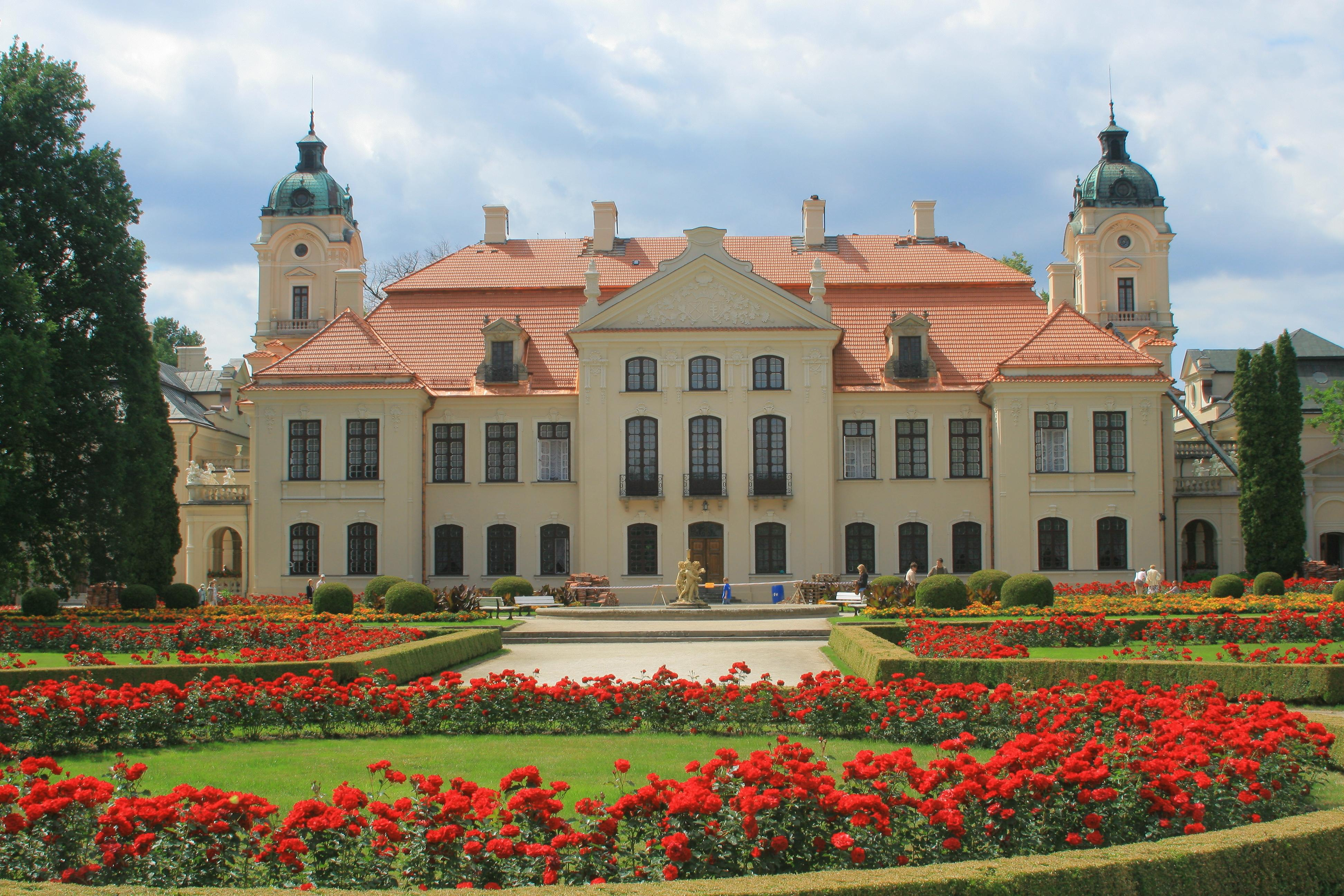
Kozłówka Palace

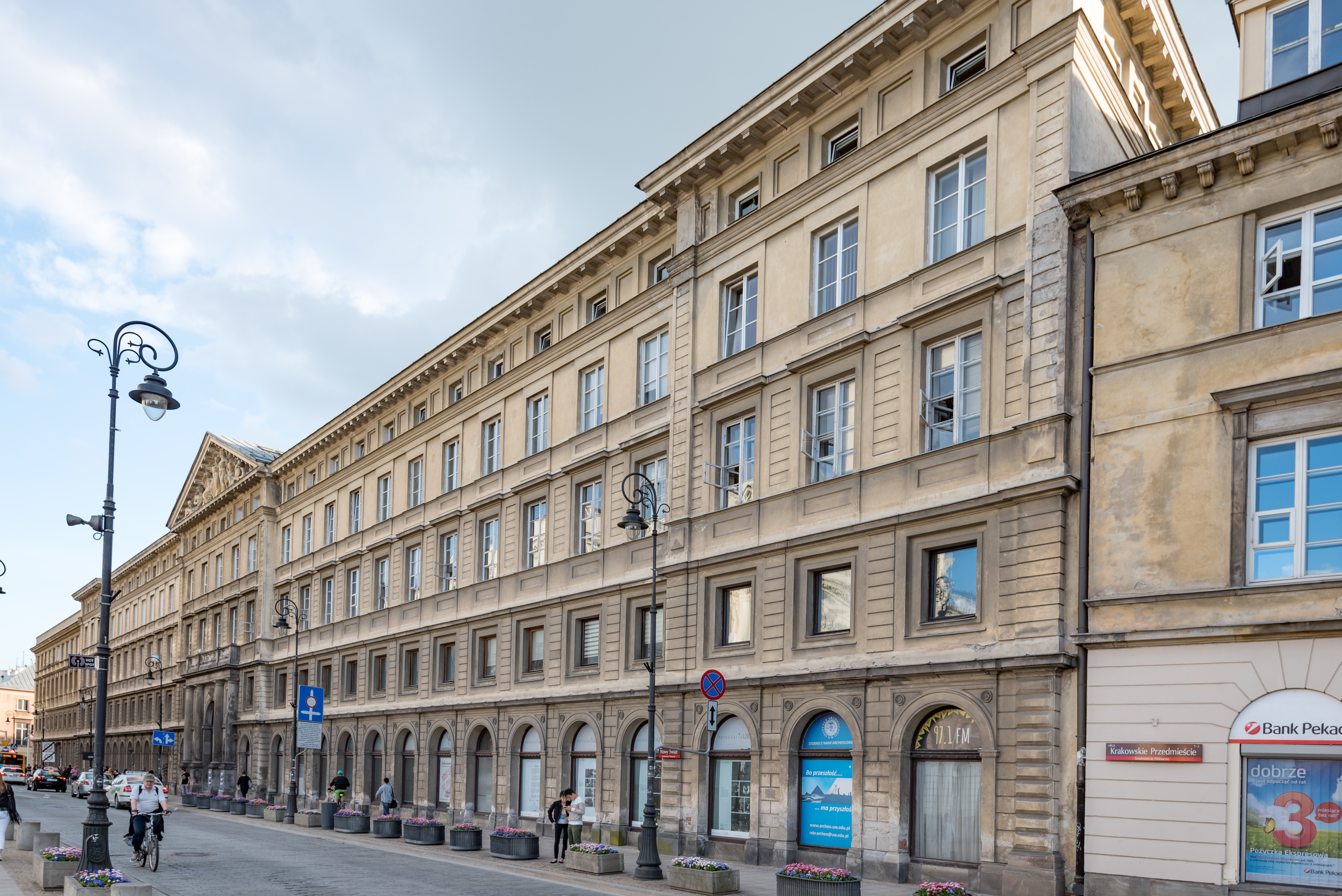
Zamoyski Palace in Warsaw

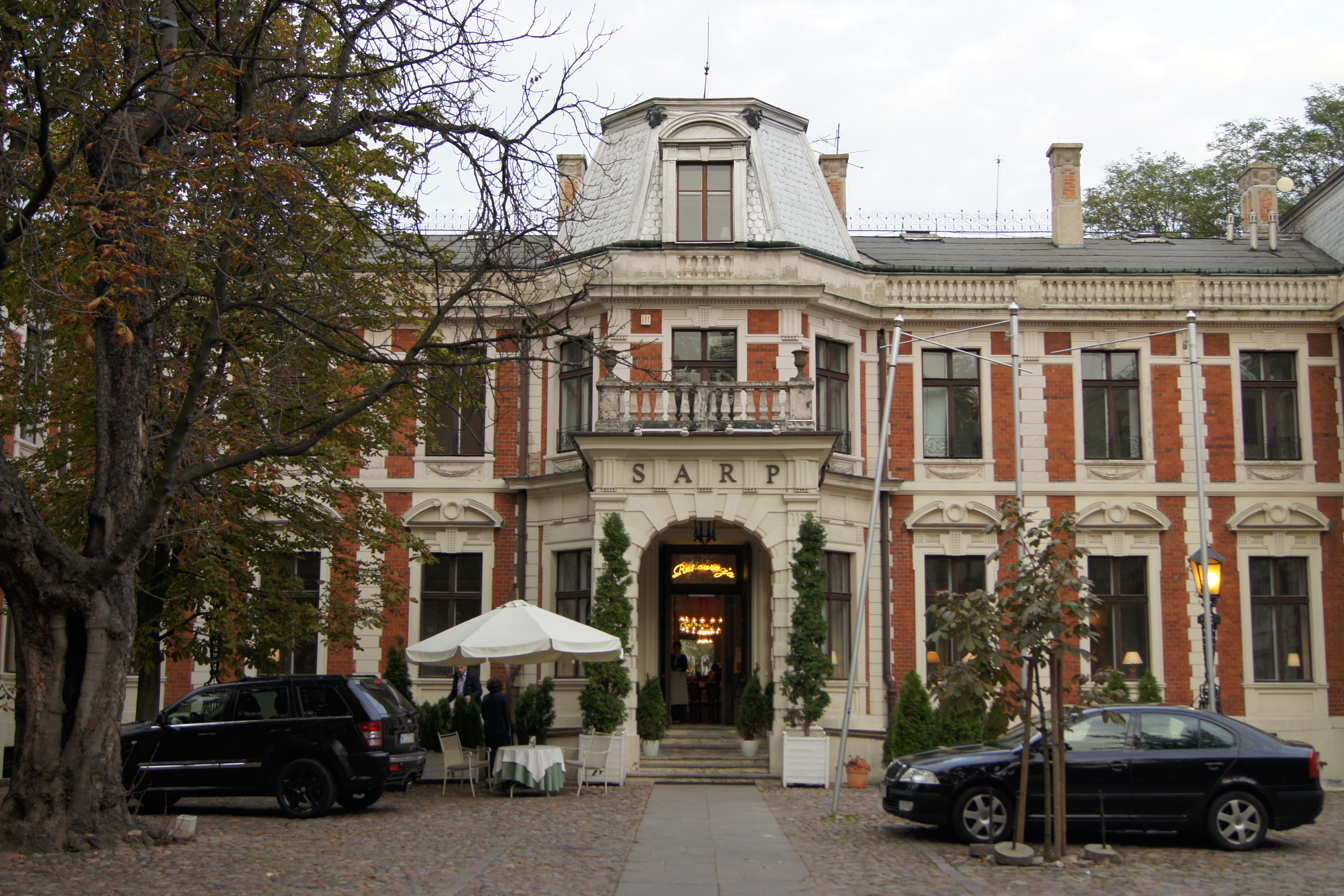
Palace of Konstanty Zamoyski in Warsaw

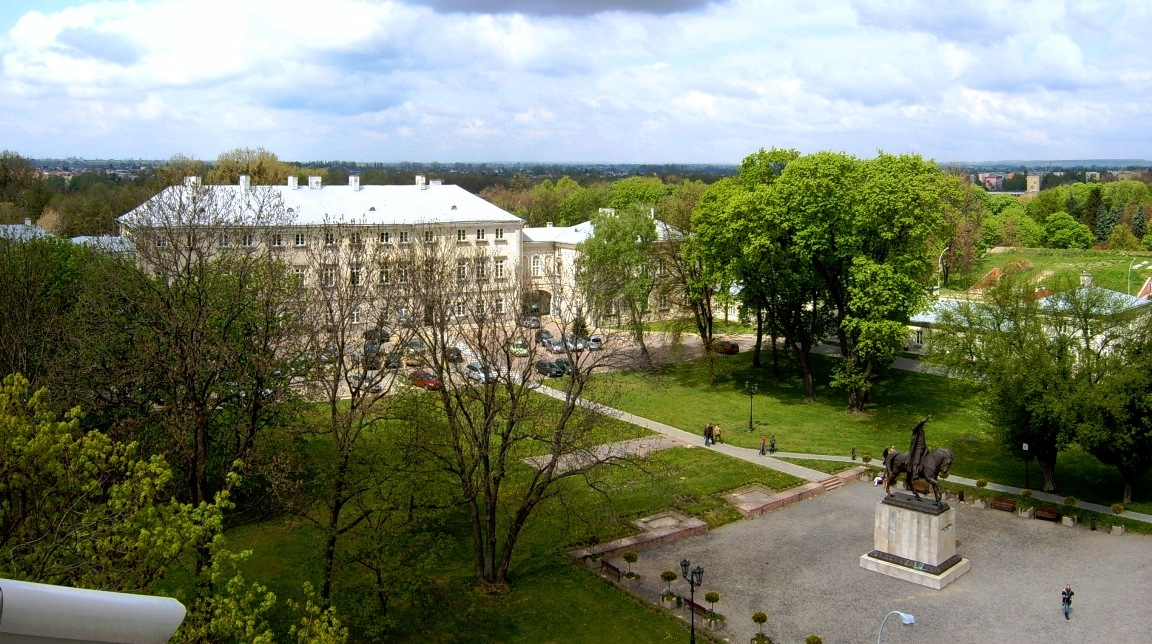
Zamoyski Palace in Zamość

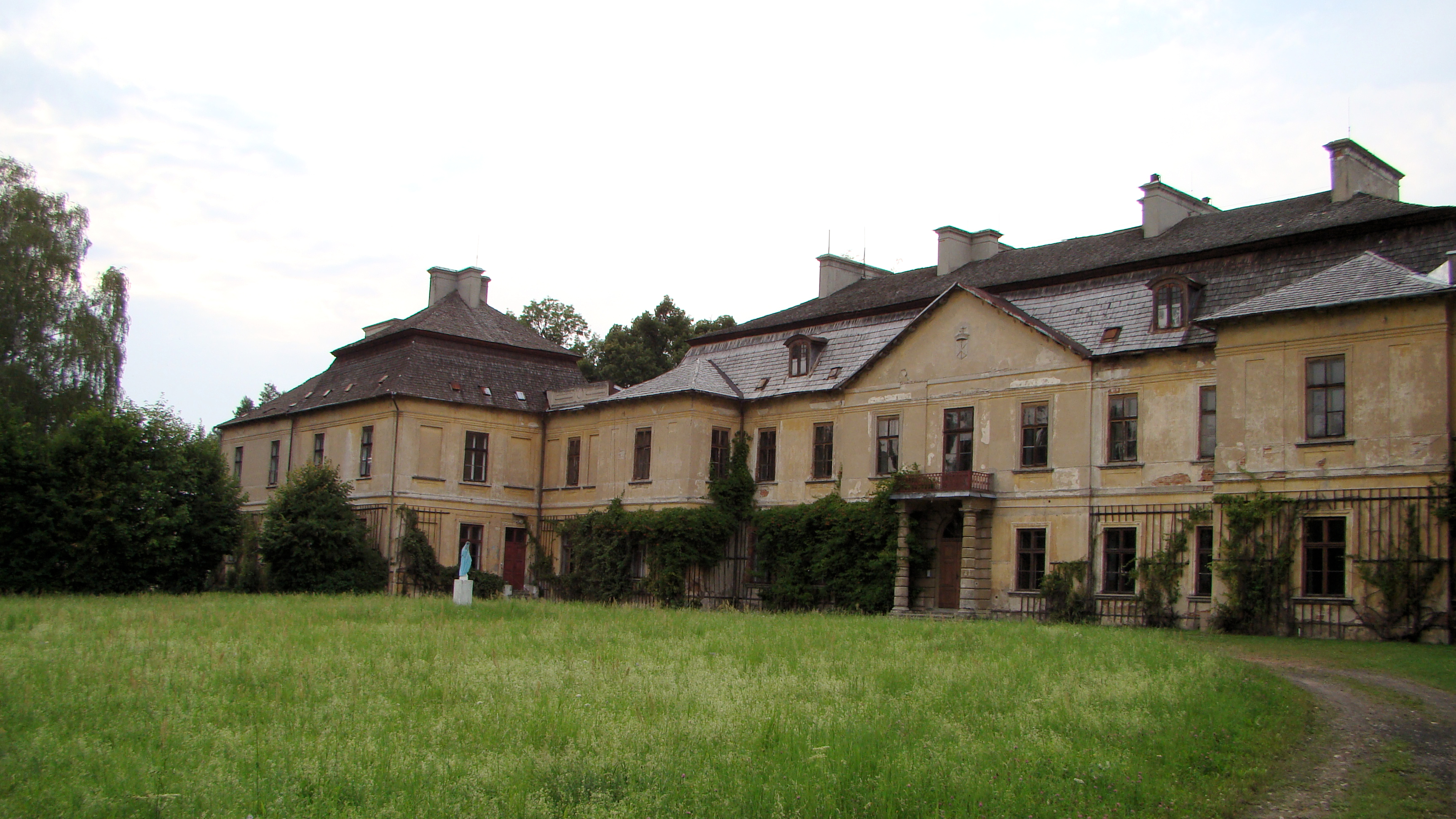
Palace in Klemensów

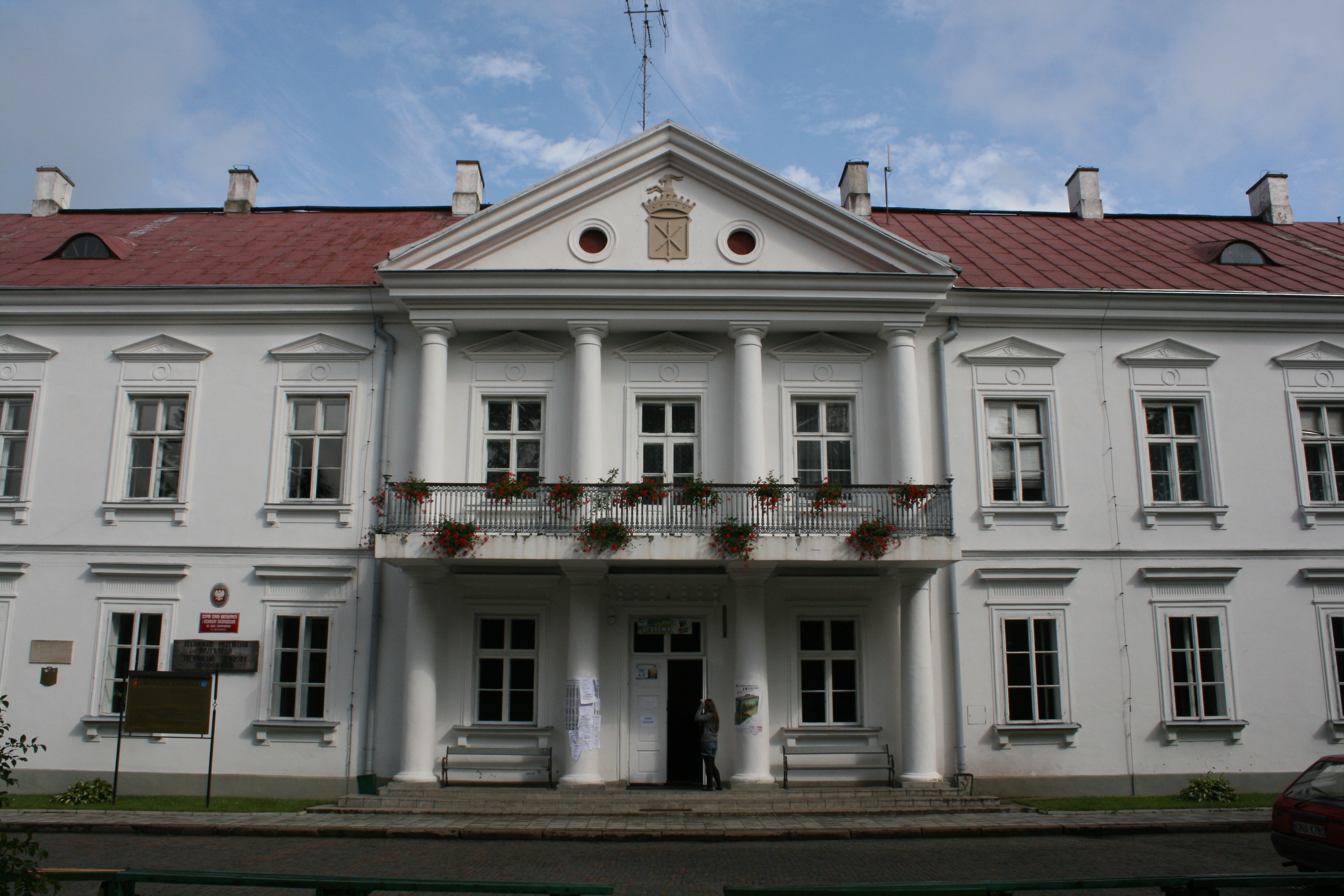
Former seat of the Zamoyski Family Fee Tail in Zwierzyniec

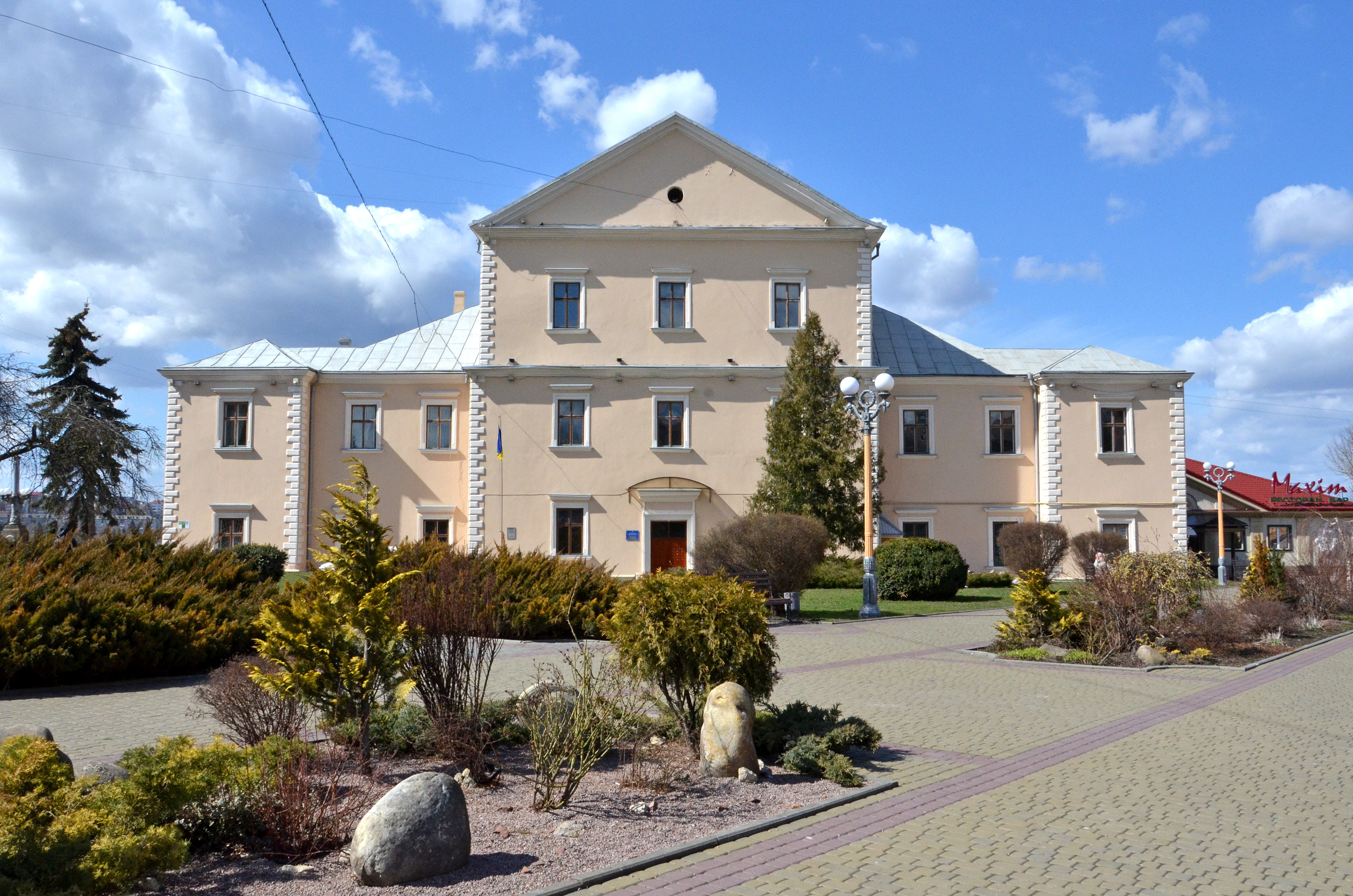
Ternopil Castle

== See also ==
- Zamoyski Academy
- Zamoyski family entail
