= Grabowski =

Grabowski is a Polish surname with forms in various languages (Grabovsky, Grabauskas, Hraboŭski, or Hrabovskyi). The Belarusian and Ukrainian variants are generally transcribed beginning with an 'h' but may also be written with a 'g'. It is also found in German surnames from the Silesia region of old Prussia.

Grabowski is the 20th most common surname in Poland (59,052 people in 2009).

== Related surnames ==
Language	Masculine	Feminine
Polish	Grabowski ([ɡraˈbɔfski])	Grabowska ([ɡraˈbɔfska])
Belarusian (Romanization)	Грабоўскі (Hraboŭski, Hrabowski, Grabouski, Grabowski)	Грабоўская (Hraboŭskaja, Hrabouskaya, Hrabouskaia, Hrabowskaya; Grabouskaja, Grabouskaya, Grabouskaia, Grabowskaya)
Czech/Slovak	Hrabovský; Grabovský	Hrabovská; Grabovská
Hungarian	Grabovszki, Grabovszky; Hrabovszki, Hrabovszky	
Latvian	Grabovskis	Grabovska
Lithuanian	Grabauskas	Grabauskienė (married); Grabauskaitė (unmarried)
Romanian/Moldovan	Grabovschi, Grabovschii; Hrabovschi	
Russian (Romanization)	Грабовский (Grabovskiy, Grabovskii, Grabovskij, Grabovsky, Grabovski)	Грабовская (Grabovskaya, Grabovskaia, Grabovskaja)
Ukrainian (Romanization)	Грабовський (Hrabovskyi, Hrabovskyy, Hrabovskyj, Hrabovsky; Grabovskyi, Grabovskyy, Grabovskyj, Grabovsky)	Грабовська (Hrabovska, Grabovska)
Other	Grabowsky, Grabofski, Grabovski, Grabofsky, Grabouskas, Hrabowsky ||	

== People ==
=== Grabowski/Grabowska ===
- Achim Grabowski, German ten-pin bowler
- Adam Stanisław Grabowski, Polish bishop
- Al Grabowski (1901–1966), baseball pitcher
- Aleksandra 'Ola' Grabowska (born 1982), Polish-British dancer
- Ałbena Grabowska (born 1971), Polish writer and neurologist
- Andrzej Grabowski (born 1952), Polish actor
- Antoni Grabowski (1857–1921), Polish Esperantist
- Barbara Grabowska (1954–1994), Polish actress
- Bartosz Grabowski (born 2000), Polish sprint canoeist
- Bernard F. Grabowski (1923–2019), American lawyer and politician
- Damian Grabowski (born 1980), Polish mixed martial artist
- Dariusz Grabowski (born 1950), Polish politician
- Dominika Grabowska (born 1998), Polish footballer
- Elżbieta Grabowska (1748–1810), Polish nobility
- Ewa Grabowska (born 1962), Polish alpine skier
- Geoffrey C. Grabowski (born 1973), American game designer
- Gene Grabowski (disambiguation), multiple individuals
- Genowefa Grabowska (born 1944), Polish politician
- Gerd Grabowski (born 1949), German singer
- Halina Grabowski (1928–2003), member of the Polish resistance movement
- Heinrich Emanuel Grabowski (1792–1842), German botanist and pharmacist of Polish heritage
- Helena Willman-Grabowska (1870–1957), Polish indologist
- Henryk Grabowski (disambiguation), multiple individuals
- Izabela Grabowska (aristocrat) (1776–1858), Polish noblewoman
- Izabela Grabowska (sociologist), Polish sociologist and economist
- Jadwiga Grabowska-Hawrylak (1920–2018), Polish architect
- Jan Grabowski (disambiguation), multiple individuals
- Janusz Grabowski (born 1955), Polish mathematician
- Jasmin Grabowski (born 1991), German judoka
- Jason Grabowski (born 1976), American baseball player
- Jedrek Grabowski (born 1982), English professional wrestler
- Jim Grabowski (born 1944), American football player
- Johnny Grabowski (1900–1946), catcher in Major League Baseball
- Juan Grabowski (born 1982), Argentine footballer
- Jürgen Grabowski (1944–2022), West German footballer
- Klementyna Grabowska (1771–1831), Polish pianist and composer
- Klaus Grabowski, German murderer killed by Marianne Bachmeier, mother of his victim
- Krzysztof Grabowski (born 1965), Polish poet, singer
- Laura Grabowski
- Lena Grabowski (born 2002), Austrian swimmer
- Maciej Grabowski (disambiguation), multiple individuals
- Marcin Grabowski (born 2000), Polish footballer
- Marek Grabowski (footballer) (born 1964), Polish footballer
- Marek Grabowski (politician) (1950–2022), Polish doctor and politician
- Martha Grabowski, American expert on risk in maritime operations
- Mateusz Grabowski (1904–1976), Polish pharmacist and art gallery owner
- Max Grabowski (1874–1946), Grabowski Motor Company/GMC (automobile) founder
- Mercedes Grabowski (1994–2017), Canadian pornographic actress
- Michał Grabowski (1773–1812), Polish general
- Michał Grabowski (author) (1804–1863), Polish author
- Morris Grabowski, Grabowski Motor Company founder
- Norm Grabowski (1933–2012), American hot rod builder and actor
- Mena Grabowski Trott (born 1977), American businesswoman
- Peter Grabowski, East German slalom canoeist
- Petra Grabowski (born 1952), East German sprint canoeist
- Piotr Grabowski (clergyman) (died 1625), Polish political writer, parish priest of Pärnu
- Piotr Grabowski (born 1947) (1947–1998), Polish actor
- Piotr Grabowski (born 1968) (born 1968), Polish actor
- Piotr Grabowski (born 1972) (born 1972), Polish actor
- Robert Grabowski (born 1956), American musician
- Reggie Grabowski (1907–1955), baseball pitcher
- Stephen Grabowski (born 1952), American politician
- Urszula Grabowska (born 1976), Polish TV actress
- Wiesław Grabowski, Polish football coach
- Władysław Grabowski (1883–1961), Polish theater & film actor, mostly comedies in the 1930s
- Zygmunt Grabowski (1891–1939), Polish painter

=== Grabowsky ===
- Adolf Grabowsky (1880–1969), German political scientist
- Jessica Grabowsky (born 1980), Finnish actress
- Luke Grabowsky (born 2008), Australian fast food worker
- Nicholas Grabowsky (born 1966), American author
- Paul Grabowsky (born 1958), Australian pianist and composer

=== Grabovsky/Grabovskyy/Grabovskii ===
- Boris Grabovsky (1901–1966), Soviet engineer
- Dmytro Grabovskyy (1985–2017), Ukrainian road bicycle racer
- Igor Grabovsky (born 1941), Soviet water polo player
- Mikhail Grabovski (born 1984), Belarusian ice hockey player

=== Hrabovsky ===
- Leonid Hrabovsky (born 1935), Ukrainian composer
- Pavlo Hrabovsky (1864–1902), Ukrainian poet
- Valentin Hrabovsky (1937–2004), Ukrainian poet

== Other ==
- Grabowsky Motor Corporation, the pre-1912 predecessor of GMC Truck
- Grabowski Prize, prize for young authors writing in Esperanto
- Laurel Rose Willson (alias Laura Grabowski), American writer
- Gary Grobowski, Vince Vaughn character in 2006 American romantic comedy-drama film The Break-Up
- Grabowsky Motor Company, division of the American automobile manufacturer General Motors
- Grabowski Gallery, London avant-garde art gallery
- Duke Grabowski: Mighty Swashbuckler!, point-and-click adventure game
