= Rubus ser. Candicantes =

- An example showing the leaves of Rubus armeniacus

Scientific classification
- Kingdom: Plantae
- Clade: Tracheophytes
- Clade: Angiosperms
- Clade: Eudicots
- Clade: Rosids
- Order: Rosales
- Family: Rosaceae
- Genus: Rubus
- Subgenus: Rubus subg. Rubus
- Series: Rubus ser. Candicantes; Focke

Series of plants

The Series Candicantes is a series of plants in the genus Rubus originating in Europe. Many species in this group have since spread to the United States where they are now considered major agricultural pests.

The most widespread species in this group, Rubus armeniacus has been found across the entirety of the United States, and the tip of Western Australia.

Rubus procerus is another introduction that is naturalized from British Columbia to Oregon.

This group can be mistaken for the Series Vestiti, notably Rubus vestitus. The group is easily distinguished by having extremely villous hairs and a much darker red stem.

They are identified by their red colored stems, large leaves, and white fuzzy leaf bottoms. Their berries are larger than in other groups of Rubus.

== Species ==
Species included in Series Candicantes:

- Rubus aciodontoides
- Rubus amiantinus
- Rubus armeniacus
- Rubus armipotens
- Rubus arrigens
- Rubus austroslovacus
- Rubus bicolor
- Rubus bifrons
- Rubus canduliger
- Rubus castellarnaui
- Rubus chloocladus
- Rubus creticus
- Rubus crispomarginatus
- Rubus eckhartii
- Rubus elatior
- Rubus fonsmatronae
- Rubus geniculatus
- Rubus godronii
- Rubus goniophorus
- Rubus grabowskii
- Rubus henrici-egonis
- Rubus incurvatiformis
- Rubus incurvatus
- Rubus lasioclados
- Rubus longipetalus
- Rubus mercieri
- Rubus montanus
- Rubus nelliae
- Rubus obtusangulus
- Rubus pericrispatus
- Rubus perperus
- Rubus phyllostachys
- Rubus poliothyrsus
- Rubus polyanthemus
- Rubus praecox
- Rubus profusus
- Rubus pydarensiformis
- Rubus rossensis
- Rubus sanctus
- Rubus spina-curva
- Rubus stenopetalus
- Rubus velutinus
- Rubus winteri
