= Izabela Grabowska =

Izabela Grabowska may refer to:

- Izabela Grabowska (aristocrat) (1776–1858), Polish noblewoman
- Izabela Grabowska (sociologist), Polish sociologist and economist
