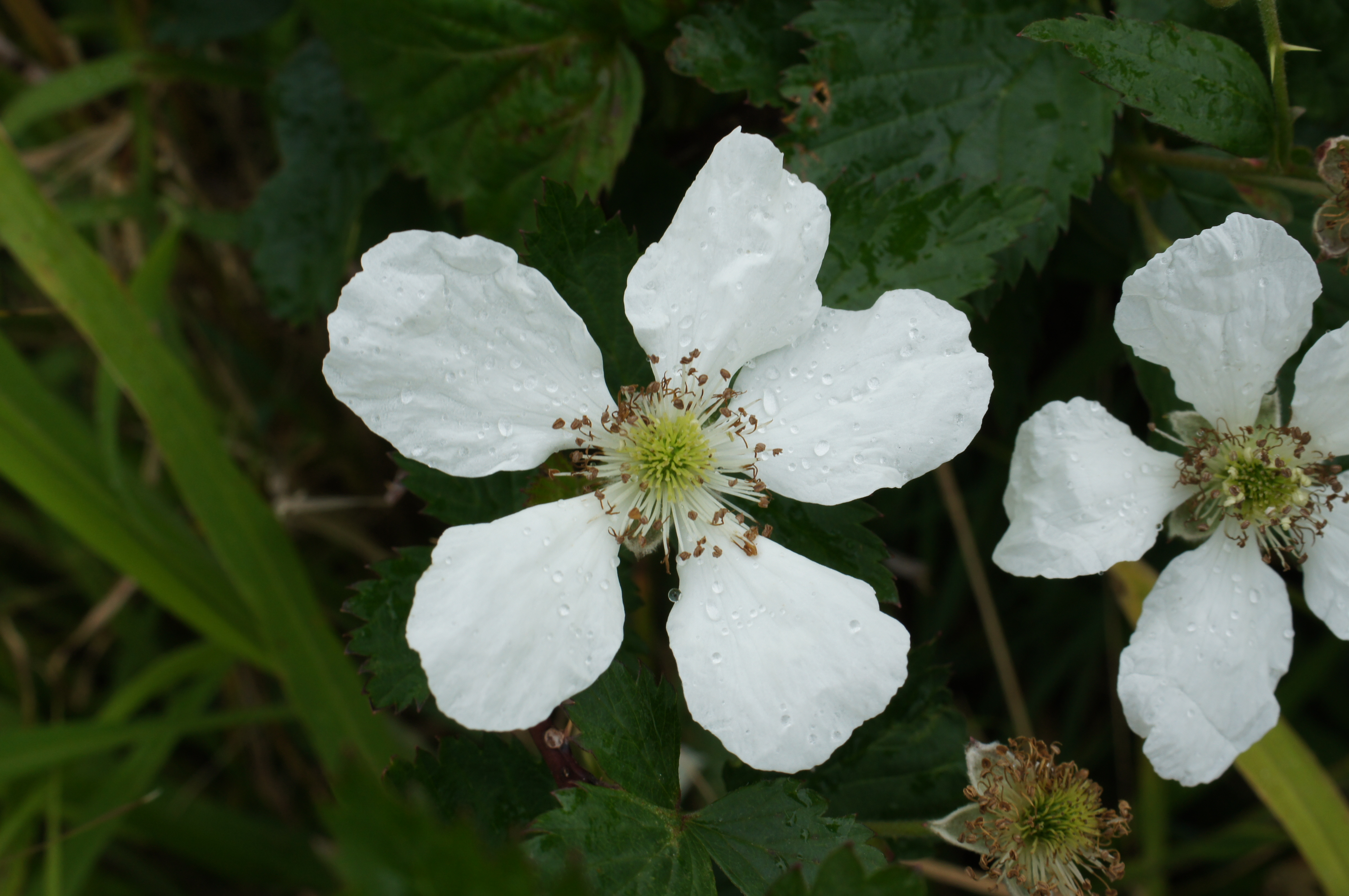
- Close-up of flower
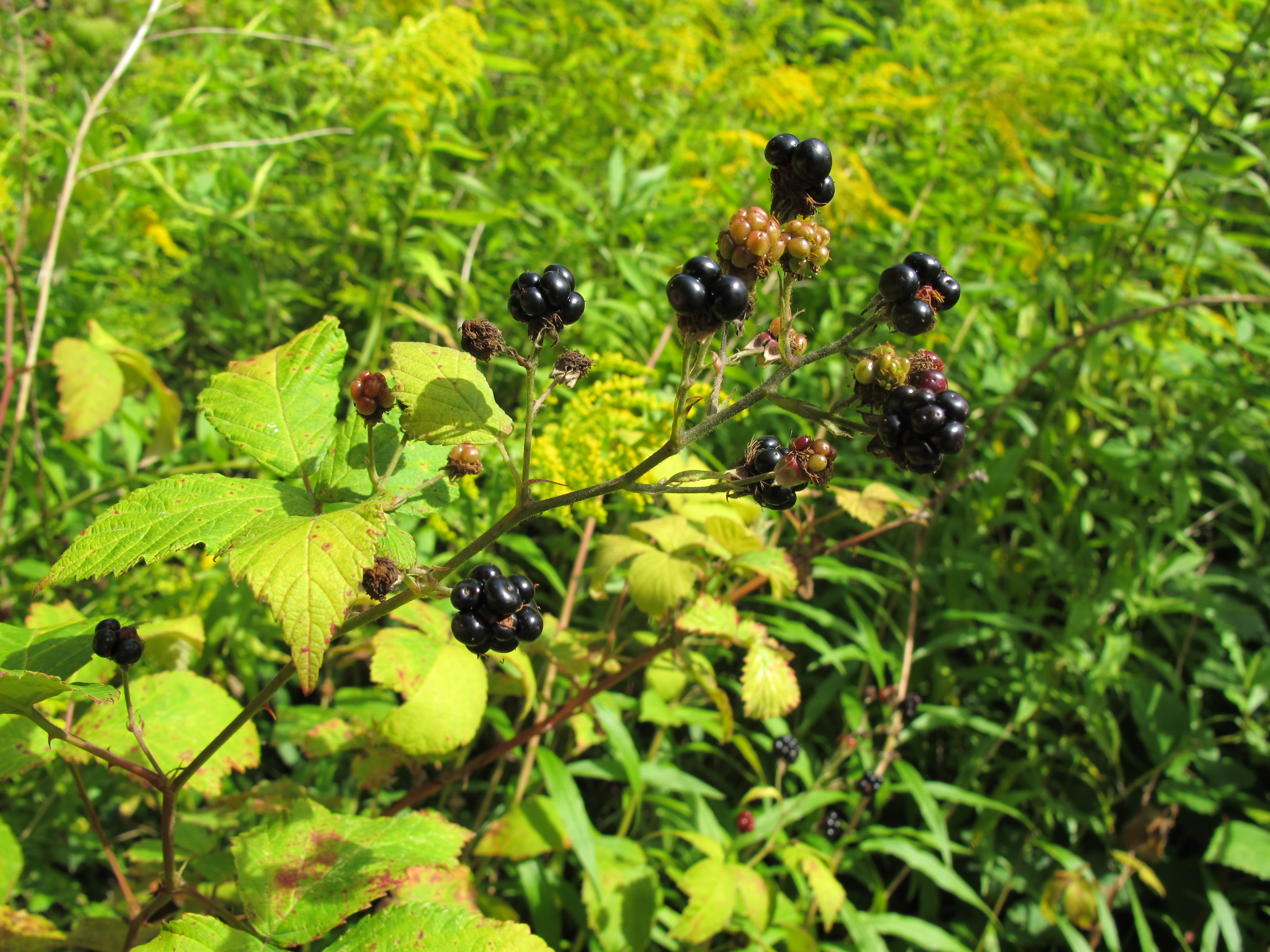
- Fruit

Scientific classification
- Kingdom: Plantae
- Clade: Embryophytes
- Clade: Tracheophytes
- Clade: Angiosperms
- Clade: Eudicots
- Clade: Rosids
- Order: Rosales
- Family: Rosaceae
- Genus: Rubus
- Species: R. grabowskii

Binomial name
- Rubus grabowskii Weihe ex Günther, Grab. & Wimm.

Synonyms
- List: Rubus anglocandicans A.Newton; Rubus arduennensis subsp. grabowskii (Weihe ex Günther, Grab. & Wimm.) Frid.; Rubus arduennensis f. thyrsanthus (Focke) Frid.; Rubus candicans var. cyclopetalus (Focke) Posp.; Rubus candicans f. diffusus G.Braun; Rubus candicans var. thyrsanthus (Focke) Sprib.; Rubus candicans subsp. thyrsanthus (Focke) Hayek; Rubus costatus var. thyrsoideus (Wimm. ex T.B.Salter) Dumort.; Rubus discolor f. euodes G.Braun; Rubus discolor f. polyanthemus G.Braun; Rubus discolor var. thyrsoideus Wimm. ex T.B.Salter; Rubus fruticosus var. albus Weston; Rubus fruticosus subsp. grabowskii (Weihe ex Günther, Grab. & Wimm.) Syme; Rubus fruticosus var. pomponius Ser.; Rubus fruticosus var. thyrsoideus Fiori; Rubus goniophylloides Sudre; Rubus hedycarpus var. parvulus G.Braun; Rubus hedycarpus f. validus G.Braun; Rubus hemidynatos J.Mayer; Rubus hispidulus Genev.; Rubus montanus var. grabowskii (Weihe ex Günther, Grab. & Wimm.) Beck; Rubus montanus var. thyrsanthus (Focke) Halácsy; Rubus muellerianus Martrin-Donos; Rubus rugicus E.H.L.Krause; Rubus schnelleri Holuby; Rubus thyrsanthus (Focke) A.Först.; Rubus thyrsanthus subsp. cyclopetalus Focke; Rubus thyrsanthus var. cyclopetalus (Focke) Focke; Rubus thyrsanthus f. grabowskii (Weihe ex Günther, Grab. & Wimm.) Neuman; Rubus thyrsanthus var. subvelutinus Lindeb.; Rubus thyrsiflorus subsp. thyrsanthus (Focke) Boulay; Rubus thyrsoideus Wimm.; Rubus thyrsoideus var. apricus Wimm.; Rubus thyrsoideus var. armoricus (Sudre) Sudre; Rubus thyrsoideus subsp. armoricus Sudre; Rubus thyrsoideus f. brachyander Tocl; Rubus thyrsoideus f. brachythyrsus Hruby; Rubus thyrsoideus subf. calcicola Bouvet; Rubus thyrsoideus f. camnutensis Nyár.; Rubus thyrsoideus var. castrensis E.Kaufmann ex Sudre; Rubus thyrsoideus var. constrictiflorus Sudre; Rubus thyrsoideus cordifolius Wimm.; Rubus thyrsoideus microgène cyclopetalus (Focke) Sudre; Rubus thyrsoideus var. degener Mercier; Rubus thyrsoideus var. eupersicinus Focke; Rubus thyrsoideus var. flaccidiformis Sudre; Rubus thyrsoideus var. floreroseo Mercier; Rubus thyrsoideus var. gallinimontanus Sprib.; Rubus thyrsoideus var. gallinimontanus Sprib. ex Sudre; Rubus thyrsoideus var. genuinus Malbr.; Rubus thyrsoideus subsp. goniophylloides (Sudre) Ade; Rubus thyrsoideus microgène goniophylloides (Sudre) Sudre; Rubus thyrsoideus var. goniophylloides (Sudre) Hruby; Rubus thyrsoideus f. grabowskii (Weihe ex Günther, Grab. & Wimm.) Lindeb.; Rubus thyrsoideus var. grabowskii (Weihe ex Günther, Grab. & Wimm.) Focke; Rubus thyrsoideus var. gracilis Godr.; Rubus thyrsoideus var. grandiflorus Mercier; Rubus thyrsoideus f. grandiflorus Hruby; Rubus thyrsoideus var. grandis Sudre; Rubus thyrsoideus microgène hispidulus (Genev.) Sudre; Rubus thyrsoideus var. hispidulus (Genev.) Boulay; Rubus thyrsoideus var. laterum Sudre; Rubus thyrsoideus f. longus Nyár.; Rubus thyrsoideus var. medullosus Boulay; Rubus thyrsoideus var. montigenus P.J.Müll. ex Sudre; Rubus thyrsoideus f. montigenus (P.J.Müll. ex Sudre) Hruby; Rubus thyrsoideus var. muellerianus (Martrin-Donos) Sudre; Rubus thyrsoideus var. oblongipetalus Touss.; Rubus thyrsoideus var. pomponius (Ser.) Godr.; Rubus thyrsoideus f. pulcherrimus Hruby; Rubus thyrsoideus var. rectiramus Mercier; Rubus thyrsoideus f. robustus Bouvet; Rubus thyrsoideus subvar. schnelleri (Holuby) Focke; Rubus thyrsoideus f. sepivagus (Sudre) Hruby; Rubus thyrsoideus subsp. sepivagus Sudre; Rubus thyrsoideus var. sepivagus (Sudre) Sudre; Rubus thyrsoideus var. simplicidentatus Sudre & Sprib.; Rubus thyrsoideus var. splendidus Gust. & Touss.; Rubus thyrsoideus f. subglandulosus Hruby; Rubus thyrsoideus var. subhispidulus Sudre; Rubus thyrsoideus f. subpubescens Sabr.; Rubus thyrsoideus f. subtriphyllus Nyár.; Rubus thyrsoideus var. subvelutinus (Lindeb.) Sudre; Rubus thyrsoideus subsp. thyrsanthus Focke; Rubus thyrsoideus var. thyrsanthus (Focke) Nyman; Rubus thyrsoideus var. verus Mercier

= Rubus grabowskii =

Species of plant

Rubus grabowskii, called Grabowski's bramble, is a species of flowering plant in the family Rosaceae. It is native to northern and central Europe, and it has been introduced to Australia. A scrambling shrub reaching 1.5 m (5 ft), it is typically found in scrublands. It is triploid.
