= Izabela Grabowska (aristocrat) =

Polish aristocrat

Izabela Elżbieta Grabowska
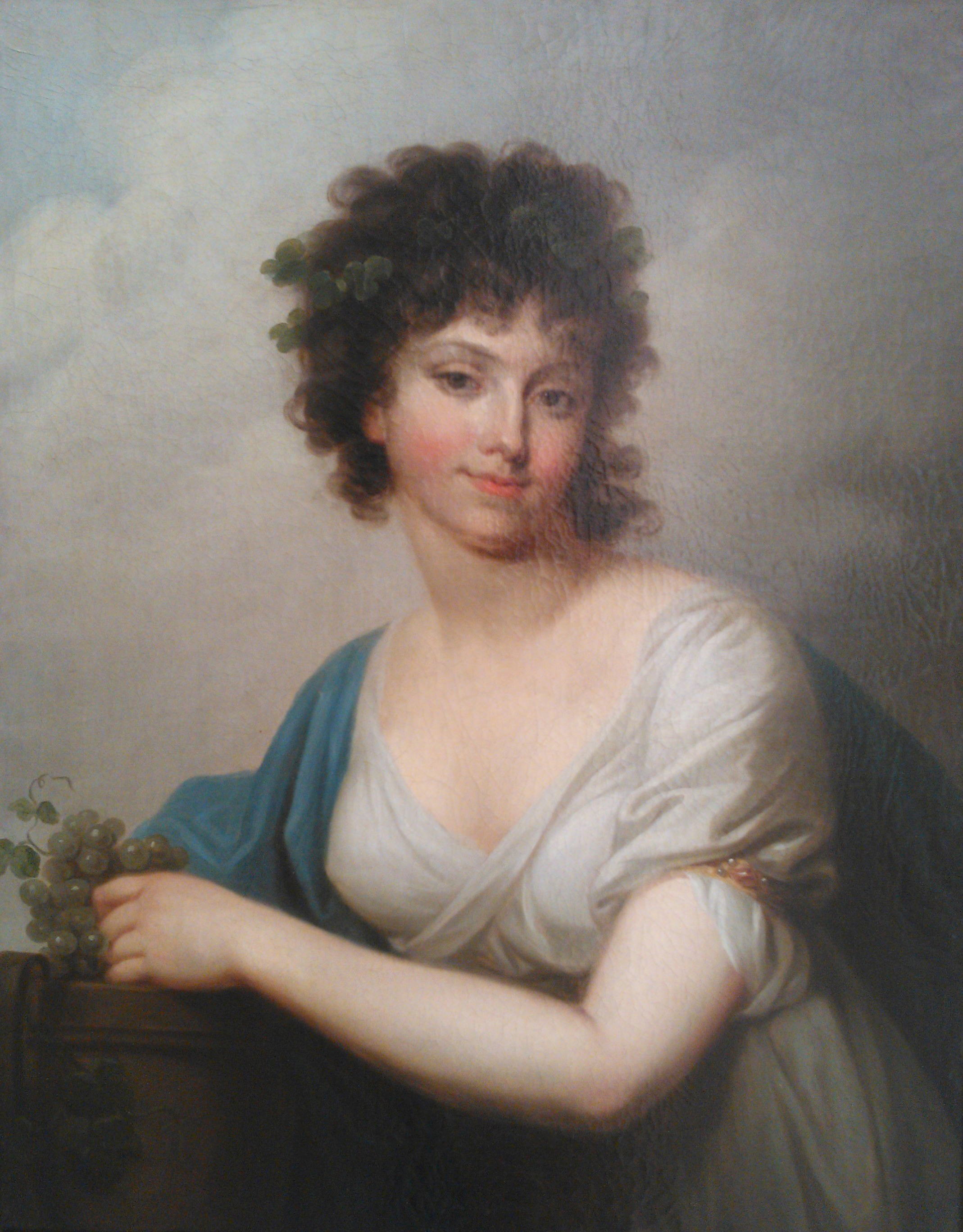
- Portrait of Izabela Grabowska by Josef Grassi

- Coat of arms
- Born: March 26, 1776
- Died: May 21, 1858 (aged 82); Warsaw
- Noble family: Grabowski of Oksza coat of arms
- Husband: Walenty Faustyn Sobolewski
- Children: Teresa Laura Józefa Sobolewska; Aleksandra Laura Sobolewska; Kwiryna Paulina Sobolewska
- Father: Stanisław August Poniatowski (officially Jan Jerzy Grabowski)
- Mother: Elżbieta Szydłowska

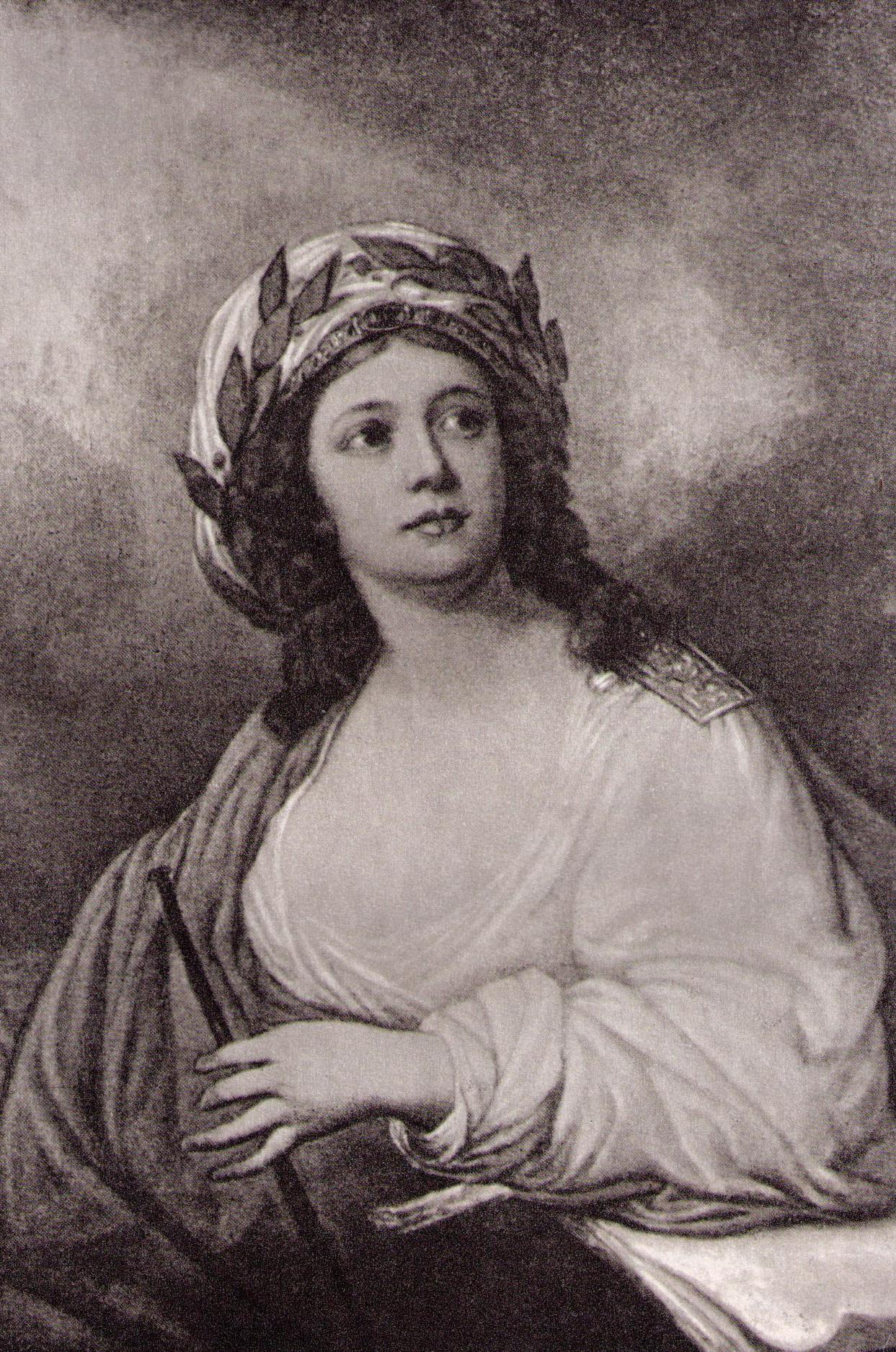
Izabela Sobolewska as Sibyl, Josef Grassi

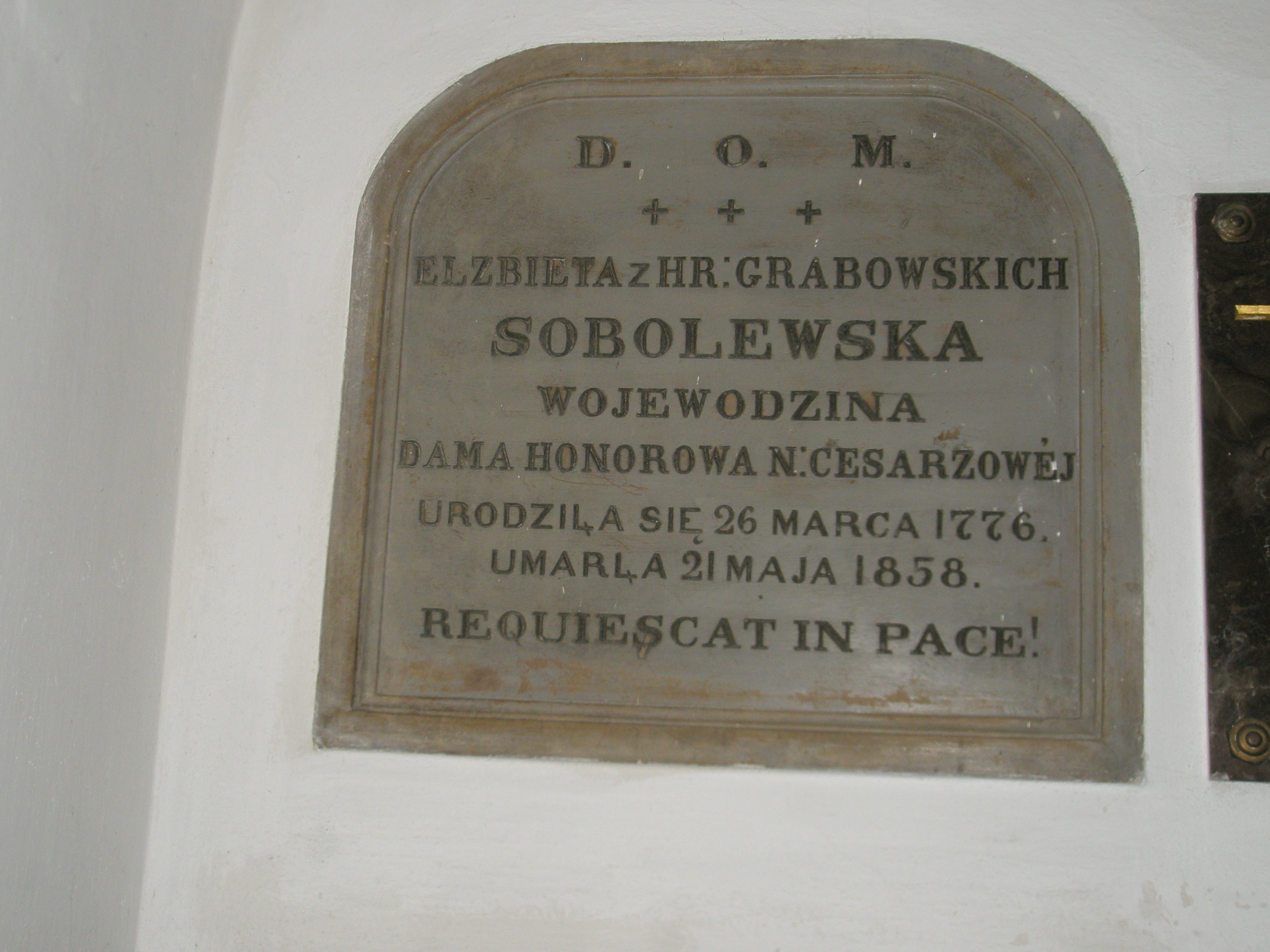
Tombstone of Izabela Sobolewska in the Minor Basilica in the Holy Cross Church in Warsaw

Izabela Elżbieta Grabowska (26 March 1776 – 21 May 1858 in Warsaw) was a Polish aristocrat, most likely the illegitimate daughter of Polish King Stanisław August Poniatowski and his mistress, and later possibly the morganatic wife, Elżbieta Grabowska.

== Biography ==
=== Origin ===
The inscription on the gravestone in the Holy Cross Church in Warsaw indicates that Elżbieta Grabowska was born on 26 March 1776. According to the fashion prevalent in 18th-century Poland, Elżbieta used the name Izabela (Izabella) – a version of her name that became popular in Poland along with cultural influences from France. She was officially considered the daughter of Lieutenant General of the Crown Army Jan Jerzy Grabowski. It is believed that she was actually the illegitimate child of his wife Elżbieta Szydłowska, stemming from a relationship with Polish King Stanisław August Poniatowski. Izabela likely received her name in honor of her biological father's sister, Izabella Poniatowska, the widow of the Kraków Voivode Jan Klemens Branicki. Izabela had four siblings: her sister Aleksandra, the wife of Franciszek Salezy Krasicki; Michał, a general in the army of the Duchy of Warsaw; Kazimierz, a marshal from Vawkavysk; and Stanisław, the Minister of Education and Confessions in the Congress Poland.

Izabela and her siblings were raised in the Catholic faith, which their mother practiced, although their father was a Calvinist. Izabela's education was overseen by a French teacher, and among her friends was Krystyna Magdalena Radziwiłłówna, the daughter of the founder of the romantic garden of Arkadia, Helena Radziwiłłowa.

=== Marriage to Walenty Sobolewski ===
In early 1795, Izabela Grabowska was engaged to royal secretary and starosta of Warsaw, Walenty Faustyn Sobolewski, at her mother Elżbieta's request. He was the son of the Castellan of Warsaw, Maciej Leon Sobolewski, and Izabela's maternal aunt, Ewa Szydłowska. Due to the close kinship of the future spouses, King Stanisław August Poniatowski commissioned the Italian cleric Gaetano Ghigiotti to obtain a papal dispensation in February 1795. The marriage took place on 1 October 1795 in Warsaw. After the wedding, the couple settled in the Branicki Palace in Warsaw, near the Holy Cross Church. On 14 October 1796, Izabela Sobolewska gave birth to their first daughter, Teresa Laura Józefa, who was baptized the following day at the Holy Cross Church. The Sobolewskis' first child died on 5 September 1798 from smallpox. In the same year, their second daughter, Aleksandra Laura, was born, who married Count Józef Ignacy Kwilecki in 1825. Their third daughter, Kwiryna Paulina, born on 30 March 1800, died on 10 May 1812 and was buried next to her older sister at the Cemetery of the Holy Cross.

According to a memoir by Natalia Kicka, a relative of Izabela, the Sobolewskis sheltered the future King of France, Louis XVIII, between 1803 and 1804 when he was forced into exile by the French Directory. After the establishment of the Duchy of Warsaw, Izabela's husband became a member of the Government Commission appointed by the decree of French Emperor Napoleon. Izabela often attended balls held in honor of the emperor and maintained a long correspondence with his Polish mistress, Marie Walewska. When Izabela's mother, Elżbieta, died on 28 May 1810, Sobolewska, along with her siblings, erected a tombstone for her at the Cemetery of the Holy Cross in Warsaw.

In May 1829, before the coronation of Emperor Nicholas I of Russia and his wife, Alexandra Feodorovna, as King and Queen of Poland, the Sobolewskis organized receptions at the Namiestnikowski Palace on Krakowskie Przedmieście Street for representatives of the aristocracy and intelligentsia of the Congress Poland, which were attended by the playwright Julian Ursyn Niemcewicz and historian Joachim Lelewel. On 18 May 1829, Izabela Sobolewska attended a reception at the Royal Castle in Warsaw in honor of the emperor, where she was appointed a lady-in-waiting to the empress. On 4 June 1831, Izabela's husband died, after which Sobolewska received a life estate on half of the estate of Młochów.

=== Later life ===
After her husband's death, Izabela moved in with her sister-in-law Marianna Gutakowska and her daughter-in-law Gabriela Zabiełłowa in the Palace at Grzybowo. She withdrew from public life, only appearing sporadically at official events as a lady-in-waiting to St. Catherine's portrait. According to Natalia Kicka's memoirs, until the end of her life, Izabela dressed in the fashions of her youth: enormous gray hats, ruffled collars, and narrow dresses. On 28 December 1843, Izabela's cohabitant, Marianna Gutakowska, died. On 26 May 1856, Izabela Sobolewska attended a reception held for the successor of Emperor Nicholas I, Alexander II of Russia, with whom she danced the polonaise as a lady-in-waiting to the previous empress.

Izabela Elżbieta Grabowska died on 21 May 1858 in the Palace at Grzybowo. She was buried on 26 May 1858 in the crypt of the Holy Cross Church, where her husband Walenty Sobolewski and her brother Stanisław Grabowski had been previously interred. After Izabela's death, Gabriela Zabiełłowa moved out of the Palace at Grzybowo, which she donated to the Congregation of the Missionaries. In place of the former estate, construction of the All Saints Church began in 1861.

== Bibliography ==
- Boniecki, Adam (1904). Herbarz polski. T. 7: Grabowscy – Hulkiewiczowie [Polish Armorial. Vol. 7: Grabowskis – Hulkiewiczóws] (in Polish). Warsaw: Gebethner i Wolff.
- Kicka, Natalia (1972). Pamiętniki [Diaries] (in Polish). Warsaw: PAX.
- Wóycicki, Kazimierz Władysław (1858). Cmentarz Powązkowski pod Warszawą [Powązki Cemetery near Warsaw] (in Polish). Vol. 3. Warsaw: Drukarnia S. Orgelbranda.
