= Aleksandra Grabowska =

Aleksandra Grabowska may refer to:

- Ola Jordan (Aleksandra Jordan, née Grabowska, born 1982), Polish-British dancer
- Aleksandra Grabowska (1771–1789), Polish noblewoman, daughter of Elżbieta Grabowska and Jan Jerzy Grabowski, married to Franciszek Salezy Krasicki
