= Carex × ligniciensis =

Scientific classification
- Kingdom: Plantae
- Clade: Tracheophytes
- Clade: Angiosperms
- Clade: Monocots
- Clade: Commelinids
- Order: Poales
- Family: Cyperaceae
- Genus: Carex
- Species: C. × ligniciensis

Binomial name
- Carex × ligniciensis Figert

Species of plant

Carex × ligniciensis is a hybrid species of sedge. Its parents are Carex buekii and Carex nigra.
