= Šidlauskas =

- Lithuanian surname
- m.: Šidlauskas
- f.: (unmarried): Šidlauskaitė
- f.: (married): Šidlauskienė
- Origin: Szydłowski, occupational surname from szydło, awl
- Related names: Shidlovsky

Šidlauskas is a Lithuanian language family name. It may refer to:

- Andrius Šidlauskas (footballer), footballer
- Andrius Šidlauskas (swimmer), swimmer
- Rimantas Šidlauskas, diplomat
- Odeta Šidlauskaitė, athlete
