= Szydłowski =

Szydłowski (feminine Szydłowska) is a Polish-language toponymic surname derived from placenames derived from the word szydło, "awl", such as Szydłów, Szydłowo, or Szydłowiec. Notable people with the surnames include:

- Elżbieta Szydłowska (1748–1810), Polish aristocrat
- Irena Szydłowska (1928–1983), Polish archer
- Joseph Szydlowski (1896–1988), Polish-Israeli aeroengineer
- Shawn Szydlowski (born 1990), American hockey player
- Sławosz Szydłowski (1894–1952), Polish athlete
- Stanisława Szydłowska (born 1944), Polish sprint canoer
- Rabbi Judah Leib ben Isaac Szydłowski (1670–1731), chief rabbi of Szydłow and Kraków

== See also ==
- Wola Szydłowska, village in Poland
