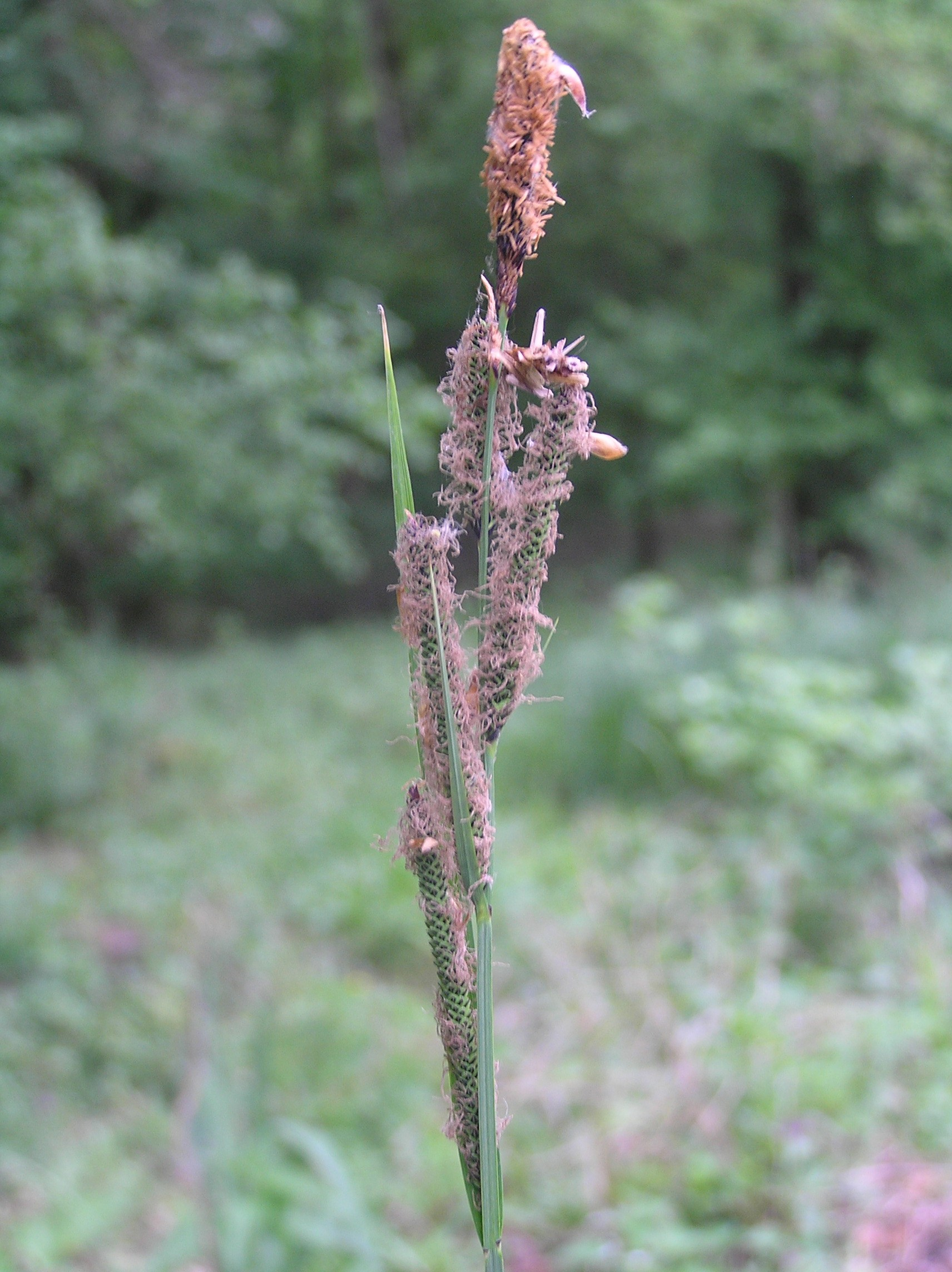
- Inflorescence

Scientific classification
- Kingdom: Plantae
- Clade: Embryophytes
- Clade: Tracheophytes
- Clade: Angiosperms
- Clade: Monocots
- Clade: Commelinids
- Order: Poales
- Family: Cyperaceae
- Genus: Carex
- Species: C. buekii

Binomial name
- Carex buekii Wimm.

Synonyms
- Carex banatica Heuff.

= Carex buekii =

Species of grass-like plant

Carex buekii, the banat sedge, is a species of flowering plant in the genus Carex, native to central, southeastern and eastern Europe, the Caucasus region, Anatolia, and the northern Levant. It forms large stands in the floodplains of central European rivers.
