= Wimmeria mexicana =

Conservation status
- Least Concern (IUCN 3.1)

Scientific classification
- Kingdom: Plantae
- Clade: Tracheophytes
- Clade: Angiosperms
- Clade: Eudicots
- Clade: Rosids
- Order: Celastrales
- Family: Celastraceae
- Genus: Wimmeria
- Species: W. mexicana

Binomial name
- Wimmeria mexicana (Moc. & Sessé ex DC.) Lundell

Synonyms
- Celastrus mexicanus Moc. & Sessé ex DC.

Species of tree

Wimmeria mexicana is a large shrub or small tree, often reaching 8 metres (26 ft) in height, that is common in the Southeastern United States and in regions of Mexico, including the states of Oaxaca, Chihuahua, and central to eastern Sonora. It is commonly called papelío and algodoncillo.

== Description ==
The branches and trunk, 30 centimetres (12 in) in diameter, are erect to ascending, making it more tall than wide. Large, flaky, papery, gray plates cover its smooth, white bark. Young twigs, petioles, and flower axils sometimes have short, tiny hairs, but are mostly glabrous. The crown is spread out and sparse. The leaves, exstipulate and 2–6 cm in length, alternate and vary in shape between lanceolate, elliptic, and obovate. Flowers tend to be 7.5–8 mm wide, white to cream colored, bisexual, with 5 petals on 5 sepals, and arranged in axillary cyme. The fruits, 1–1.4 cm across, are papery, one-seeded, three-lobed samaras, similar to species of Dodonaea.

Wimmeria mexicana mass flowers around July to October, or often after heavy Autumn rain, attracting a large number of insects, particularly bees and flies. The leaves have serrated edges due to insects.

== Uses ==
Wood from the tree is commonly used to make fence posts, house beams, and firelogs. Also, the Guarijío prepare herbal tea, malo en el cuerpo (pain in the body), from W. mexicana, chamomile, and cilantro.

== Taxonomy ==
Wimmeria confusa, a synonym of W. mexicana, was so named because it had been previously confused with Wimmeria concolor and was so figured in William Hooker's Icones Plantarum. W. confusa was named by William Hemsley in 1878, based on a plant collected by Karl Hartweg. The same year, Ludwig Radlkofer described W. pallida, based on the same Hartweg specimen as well as specimens collected by Thaddäus Haenke (perhaps in Acapulco) and Frederik Liebmann. This was confusingly also called W. confusa in Biologia Centrali-Americana.
