= Wimmeria montana =

Conservation status
- Vulnerable (IUCN 3.1)

Scientific classification
- Kingdom: Plantae
- Clade: Tracheophytes
- Clade: Angiosperms
- Clade: Eudicots
- Clade: Rosids
- Order: Celastrales
- Family: Celastraceae
- Genus: Wimmeria
- Species: W. montana

Binomial name
- Wimmeria montana Lundell

Species of tree

Wimmeria montana is a species of flowering plant in the family Celastraceae. It is a tree endemic to Chiapas in southern Mexico.
