= Słuck Confederation =

18th century Polish confederation

The Słuck Confederation was a confederation formed in Slutsk on March 20, 1767 by the Protestant (Calvinist) szlachta of the Great Duchy of Lithuania. Its marshal was Jan Jerzy Grabowski. Supported by the Russian army, it contributed to the destabilization of the Polish–Lithuanian Commonwealth, formation of the Radom Confederation and to the collapse of the reforms of the Convocation Sejm (1764).

== See also ==
- Repnin Sejm
