= Wimmeria acuminata =

Conservation status
- Endangered (IUCN 3.1)

Scientific classification
- Kingdom: Plantae
- Clade: Tracheophytes
- Clade: Angiosperms
- Clade: Eudicots
- Clade: Rosids
- Order: Celastrales
- Family: Celastraceae
- Genus: Wimmeria
- Species: W. acuminata

Binomial name
- Wimmeria acuminata L.O.Williams

Species of tree

Wimmeria acuminata is a species of plant in the family Celastraceae. It is endemic to the Mexican state of Chiapas.
