= Wimmeria chiapensis =

Conservation status
- Endangered (IUCN 3.1)

Scientific classification
- Kingdom: Plantae
- Clade: Tracheophytes
- Clade: Angiosperms
- Clade: Eudicots
- Clade: Rosids
- Order: Celastrales
- Family: Celastraceae
- Genus: Wimmeria
- Species: W. chiapensis

Binomial name
- Wimmeria chiapensis Lundell

Species of tree

Wimmeria chiapensis is a species of flowering plant in the family Celastraceae. It is endemic to Chiapas state in southern Mexico.
