= Gene Grabowski =

Gene Grabowski may refer to:

- Gene Grabowski (soccer)
- Gene Grabowski (communications strategist)
