= Jan Grabowski (disambiguation) =

Jan Grabowski (born 1962) is a Polish-Canadian historian.

Jan Grabowski may also refer to:

- Jan Grabowski (speedway rider) (1950–2017)
- Jan Jerzy Grabowski, 18th-century Polish nobleman and general
