= Henryk Grabowski =

Henryk Grabowski may refer to:

- Heinrich Emanuel Grabowski, also known as Henryk Grabowski (1792–1842), German botanist
- Henryk Grabowski (athlete) (1929–2012), Polish long jumper
