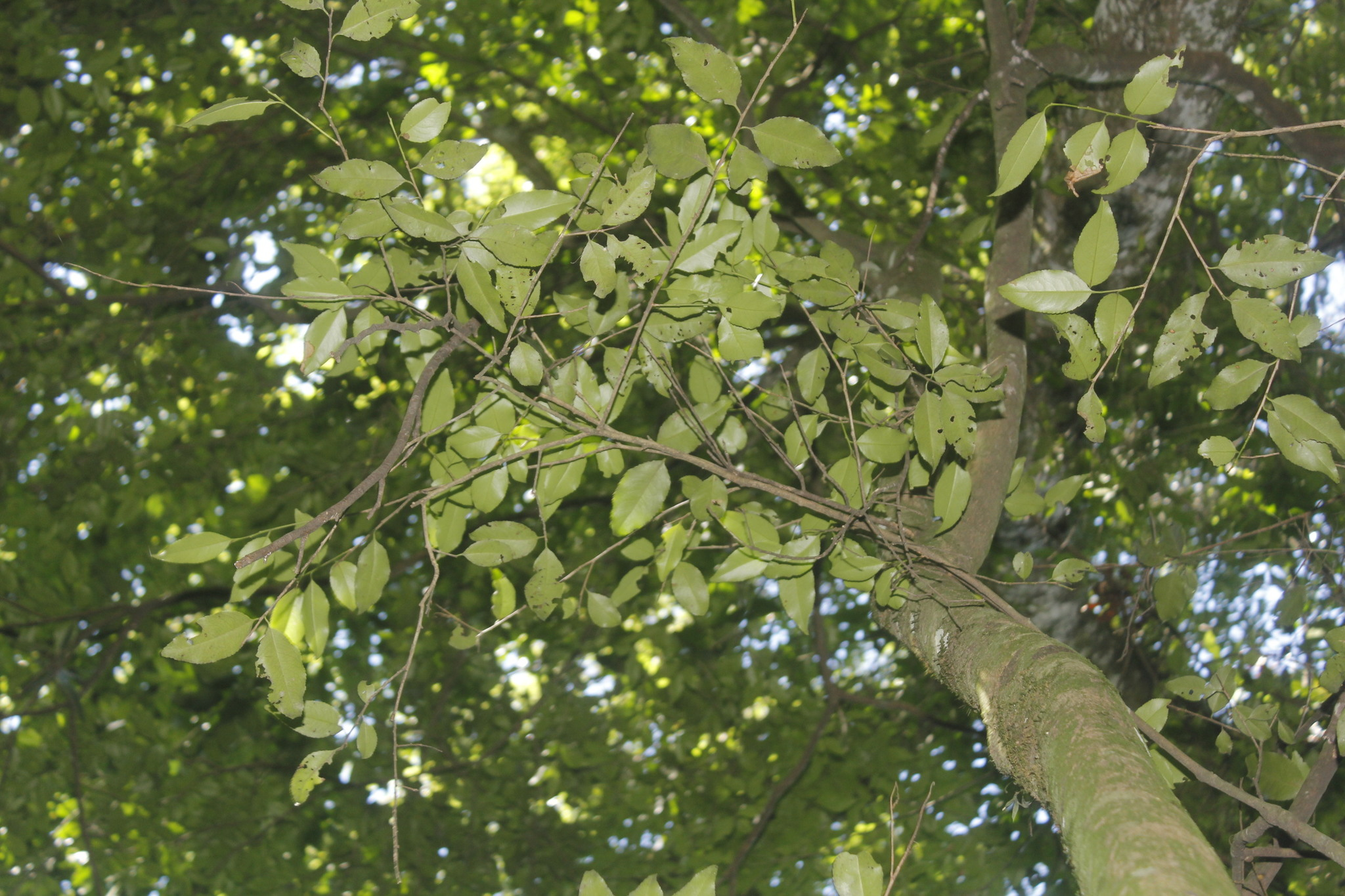
- Wimmeria concolor

Scientific classification
- Kingdom: Plantae
- Clade: Tracheophytes
- Clade: Angiosperms
- Clade: Eudicots
- Clade: Rosids
- Order: Celastrales
- Family: Celastraceae
- Genus: Wimmeria; Schltdl. & Cham. (1831)

= Wimmeria =

Genus of shrubs

Wimmeria is a genus of shrubs to small trees in the family Celastraceae. It includes 17 species native to Mexico and Central America. It is named after German botanist Christian Friedrich Heinrich Wimmer (1803–1868).

== Species ==
17 species are accepted.

- Wimmeria acuminata L. O. Williams
- Wimmeria bartlettii Lundell
- Wimmeria chiapensis Lundell
- Wimmeria concolor Cham. & Schltdl.
- Wimmeria confusa Hemsl.
- Wimmeria cyclocarpa Radlk. ex Donn. Sm.
- Wimmeria excoriata J.E.Jiménez & Barrie
- Wimmeria lanceolata Rose
- Wimmeria lundelliana Carnevali, R.Duno, J.L.Tapia & I.Ramírez
- Wimmeria mexicana (Moc. & Sessé ex DC.) Lundell (synonym Celastrus mexicanus)
- Wimmeria microphylla Radlk.
- Wimmeria montana Lundell
- Wimmeria obtusifolia Standl.
- Wimmeria persicifolia Radlk.
- Wimmeria pubescens Radlk.
- Wimmeria serrulata Radlk.
- Wimmeria sternii Lundell

== See also ==
- Celastrus
- Maytenus
- Sapindus
- Zinowiewia
