= Valentin Hrabovsky =

Ukrainian author (1937–2004)

Valentine Hrabovsky (10 July 1937, Horodne - 24 December 2004, Zhytomyr) was a famous Ukrainian poet, translator, art critic, and journalist. He was a member of the Soviet Union of Writers.

== Life ==
He was born on 10 July 1937 in Horodne in the well-off family. A few years later they moved into Virivka. There Valentine came to know and love the world of nature. During his childhood he liked to gather blackberries and raspberries, to mushroom and to fish. He was very obedient and smart child. When Valentine was a little boy, his father died in the war. He was the only child in the family, so he lived just with his mother. Later she became the most important figure in his poems.

Valentine graduated from primary school in Virivka. Then he was studying in Naraiiw and Velykoyablunivka. In 1954 he went to Zhytomyr Pedagogical University at the Faculty of Philology. Later he was studying journalism in Kyiv. His first article was published in the magazine Kolhospna pratsya. He was working as a newspaper editor for almost 10 years. Valentine was also leading the Regional Literary Borys Ten Association.

== Poems ==
He started to write in school magazines. In 1966 he published his first collection of poems called Keys. In this collection he was trying to find something personal and special. His works were about the high destiny of man, the greatness of self-sacrifice for others and the loyalty to homeland. At the same time the writer was thinking about the beauty and the complicacy of life. The second collection of poems was published in 1968 and was called Once mother had a dream about the cherry tree. It showed the proficiency and experience of the writer. In this collection he wrote about his mother. She was the greatest love in his life. In general, the poems were permeated with lyricism. Valentine Hrabovsky published about 15 books. There were his poems, translations, art articles. The works of the later period were basically historical ("Volodymyr", "Gaydamak’s mother" etc.) He was also interested in the environmental problems and the problem of the environmental soul. He saw not only the beautiful nature but also the tragic consequences of the war, Chernobyl disaster and he described that in his poems. The remarkable thing is that the important social problems did not reduce the amount of lyric feelings in his works. In 1999 Valentine published the collection called Mystery of Zhytomyr’s pictures, where he described the wonderful nature.

== Translations ==
Valentin Hrabovsky was a professional translator. He translated the works of Adam Bernard Mickiewicz, Alexandr Pushkin, Olizar Gustav, Max Tank and others. These translations were published in the book which was called "Conversation with the stone". In his translations Valentine gave the vivid description of the characters, their mode of life, manners and tastes. His knowledge of human nature is broad. He could reproduce the same emotions and feelings as in the original works. He used to say that he wished to describe men and women as they really were.

== Death ==
Valentine Hrabovsky was very popular among ordinary people as well as by well-known writers. He was very kind and sympathetic. The writer was working with young creative people and supported the talented youth. He died on December 24, 2004, at the age of 67. After his death he was called "Orpheus of Woodlands".

A memorial plaque was installed in 2006 at his residence, and also in 2011 at the newspaper building that he worked for.
