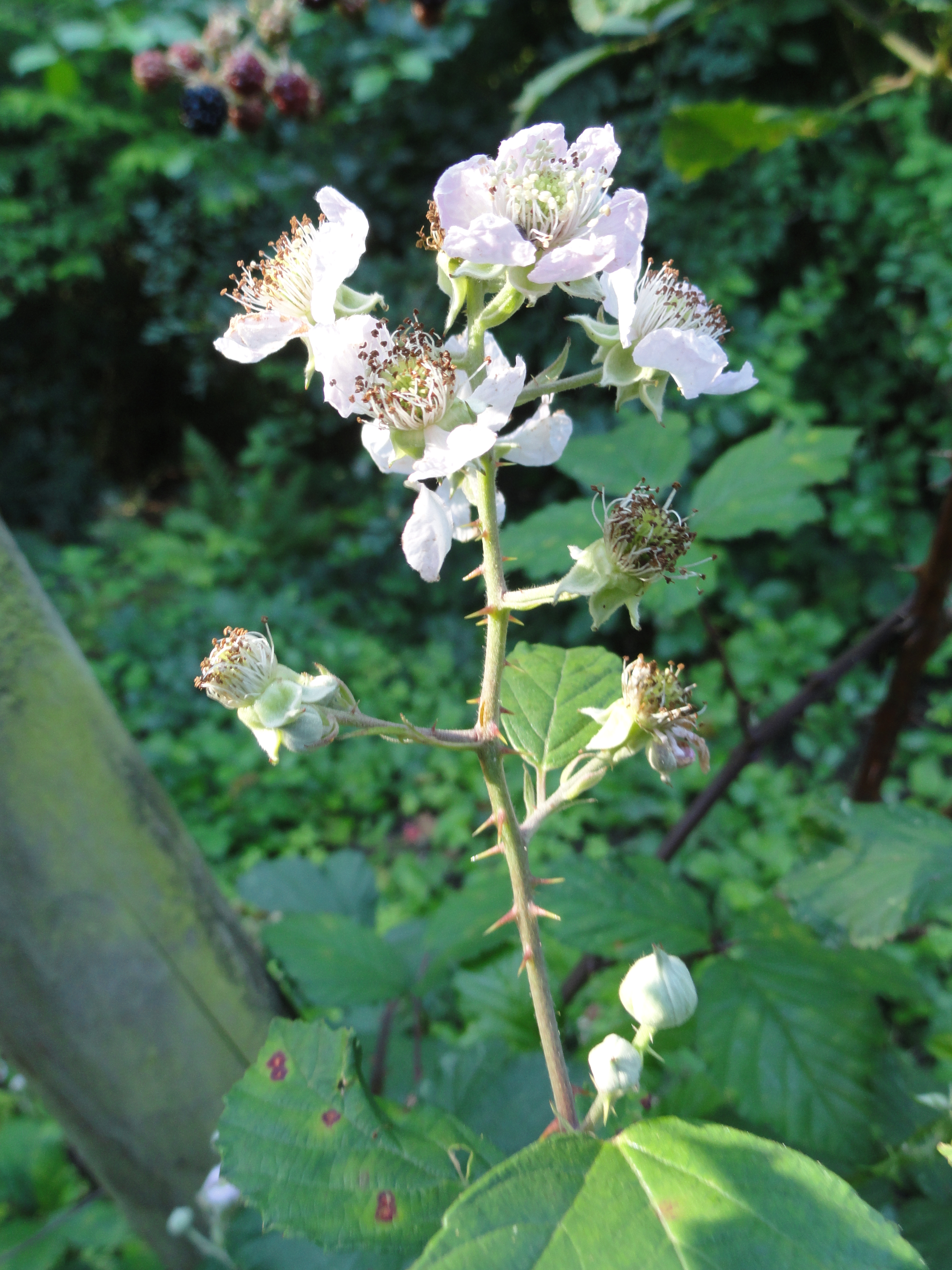
- Flowers
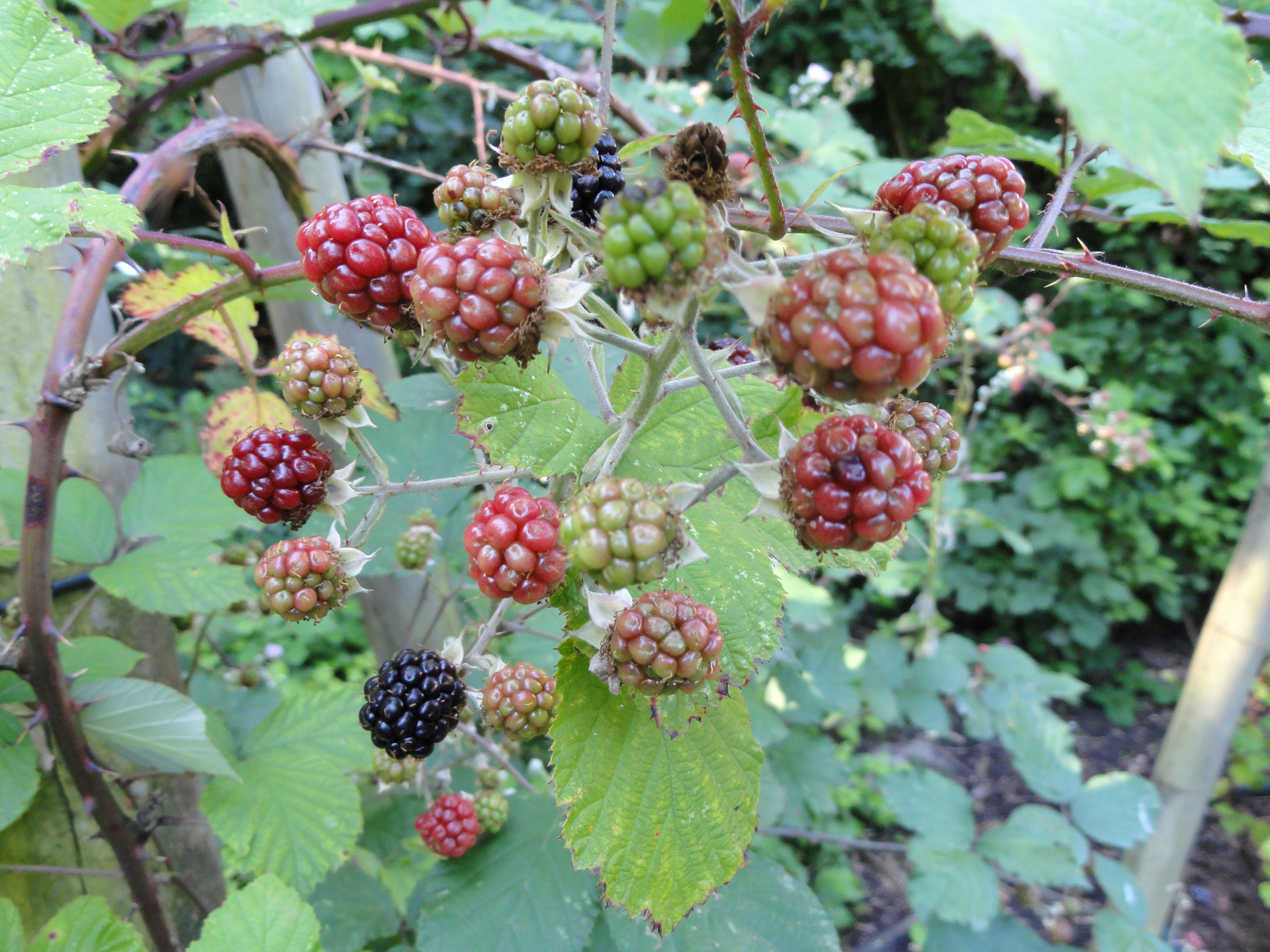
- Fruit

Scientific classification
- Kingdom: Plantae
- Clade: Embryophytes
- Clade: Tracheophytes
- Clade: Angiosperms
- Clade: Eudicots
- Clade: Rosids
- Order: Rosales
- Family: Rosaceae
- Genus: Rubus
- Species: R. bifrons

Binomial name
- Rubus bifrons Vest

= Rubus bifrons =

Species of blackberry from Europe

Rubus bifrons is a species of blackberry in the rose family, native to central Europe.

Rubus bifrons is a spiny shrub growing to 25–200 cm tall. The stems are biennial, arching, sometimes creeping, and red-brown to purple-brown. The leaves are palmately compound with three to five leaflets, green above, grey and hairy beneath, and have serrated margins. The flowers are white or pink, in clusters at the ends of branches. The mature fruit is black.

It is widespread across much of Europe, from France east to Ukraine, and Germany south to Italy. and naturalised locally further north in Europe in Norway and Sweden, in Australia, and in parts of North America.

It has sometimes been confused with or considered to include the species Rubus armeniacus, a related species from the Caucasus.
