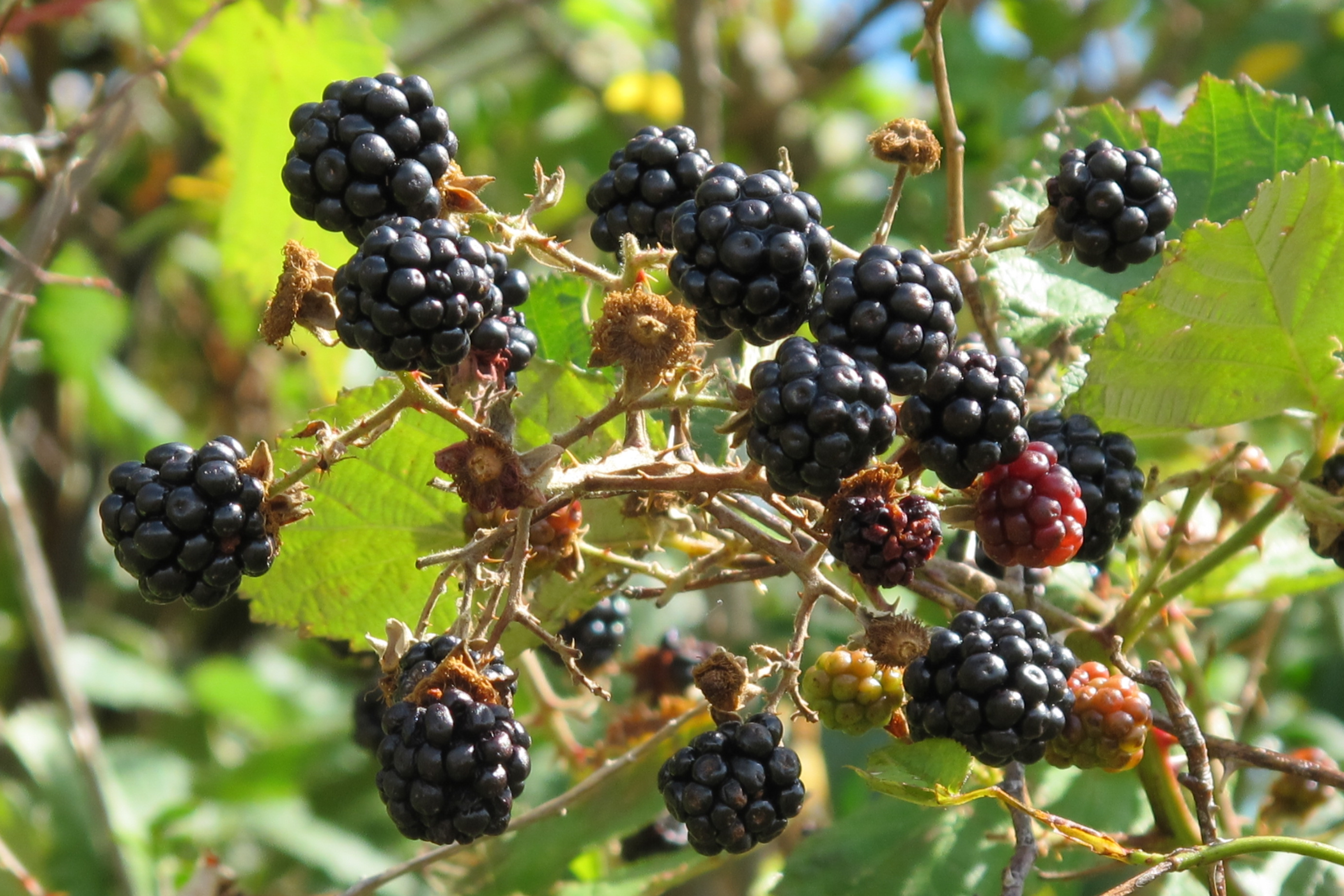
- Fruiting plant
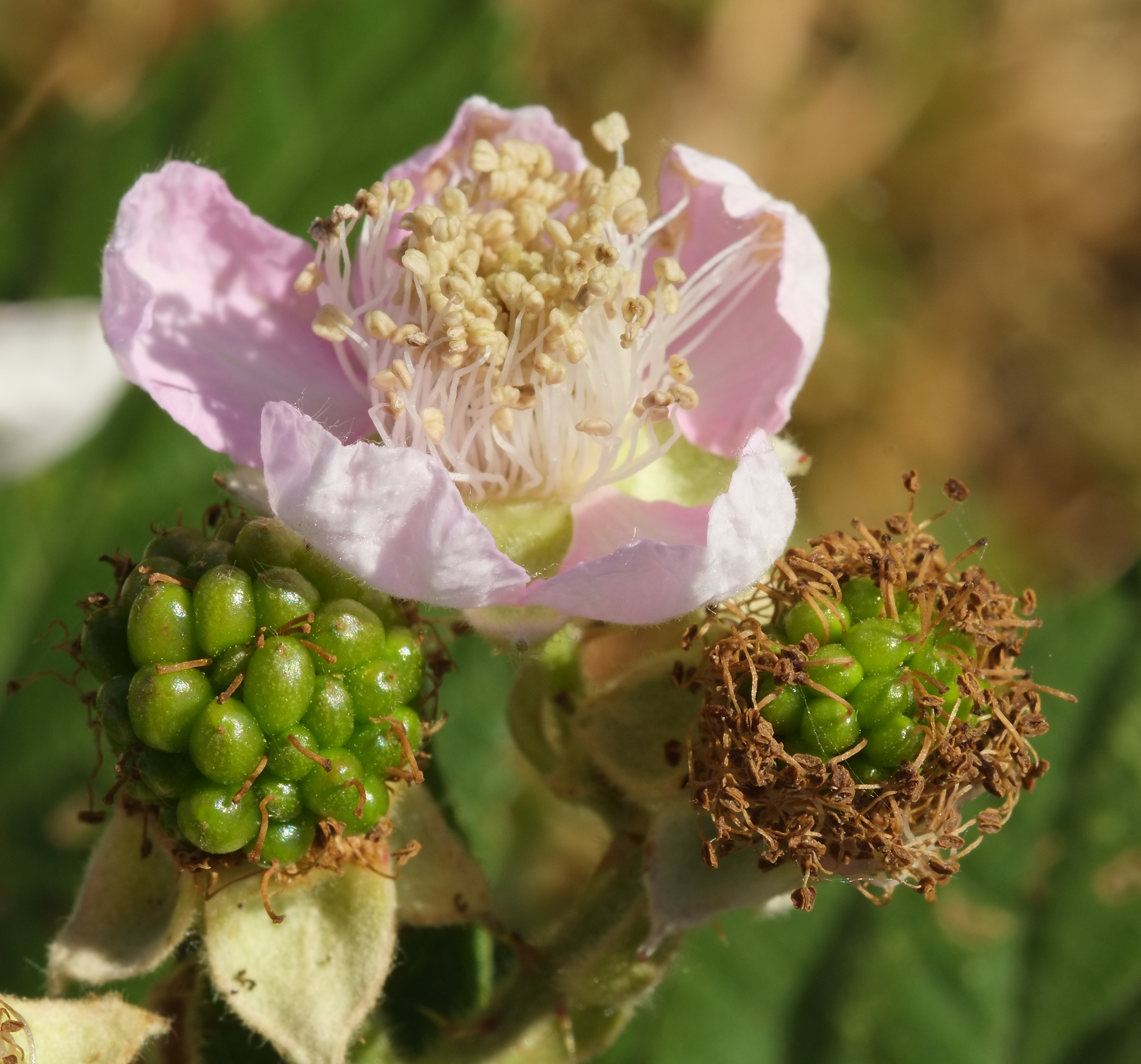
- Flower and immature fruit

Scientific classification
- Kingdom: Plantae
- Clade: Tracheophytes
- Clade: Angiosperms
- Clade: Eudicots
- Clade: Rosids
- Order: Rosales
- Family: Rosaceae
- Genus: Rubus
- Subgenus: Rubus subg. Rubus
- Species: R. armeniacus

Binomial name
- Rubus armeniacus Focke 1874

Synonyms
- Rubus hedycarpus subsp. armeniacus (Focke) Erichsen; Rubus hedycarpus subsp. armeniacus (Focke) Focke; Rubus hedycarpus var. armeniacus (Focke) Focke; Rubus macrostemon f. armeniacus (Focke) Sprib.

= Rubus armeniacus =

Species of fruit and plant

Rubus armeniacus, the giant blackberry, Armenian blackberry, or sometimes, misleadingly, "Himalayan blackberry", is a species of Rubus in the blackberry group Rubus subgenus Rubus series Discolores (P.J. Müll.) Focke. It is native to Armenia and northwestern Iran, and widely invasive elsewhere. Both its scientific name and origin have been the subject of much confusion.

It is known for its extreme vigour and tendency to spread rapidly over disturbed areas. It is considered an invasive species and a noxious weed in many regions, but is or was also widely cultivated for its edible fruit; this is large and sweet when ripe, and is one of the most popular blackberries. Its history of discovery and introduction into cultivation are poorly documented; its first definite cultivation was in Germany by 1889, but probably earlier, in 1835, under the name "Rubus fruticosus fr. maximo Booth". (Note: This is nearly 40 years before the species was described, so its application to this species is open to some uncertainty)

== Description ==
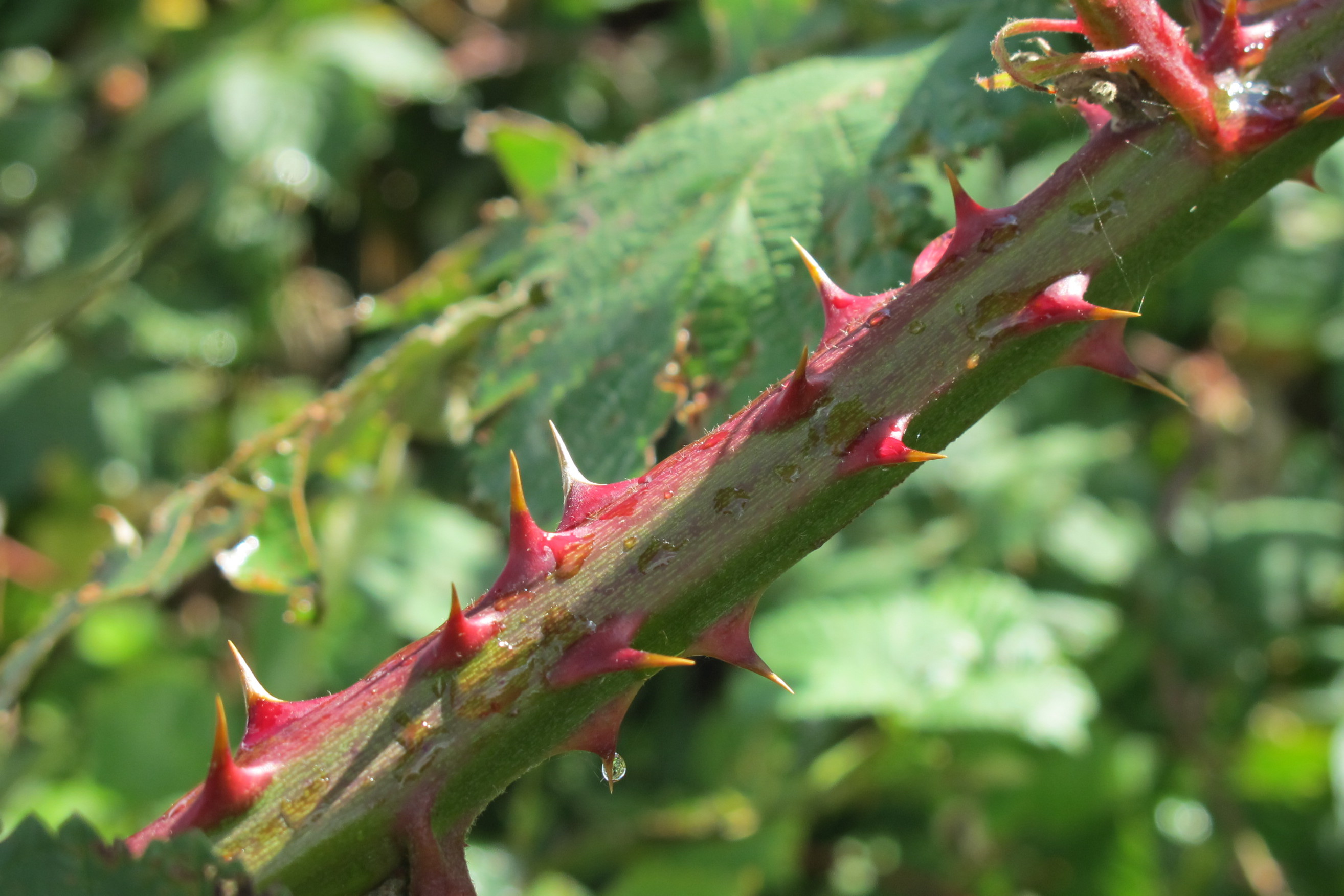
First year stem with stout prickles

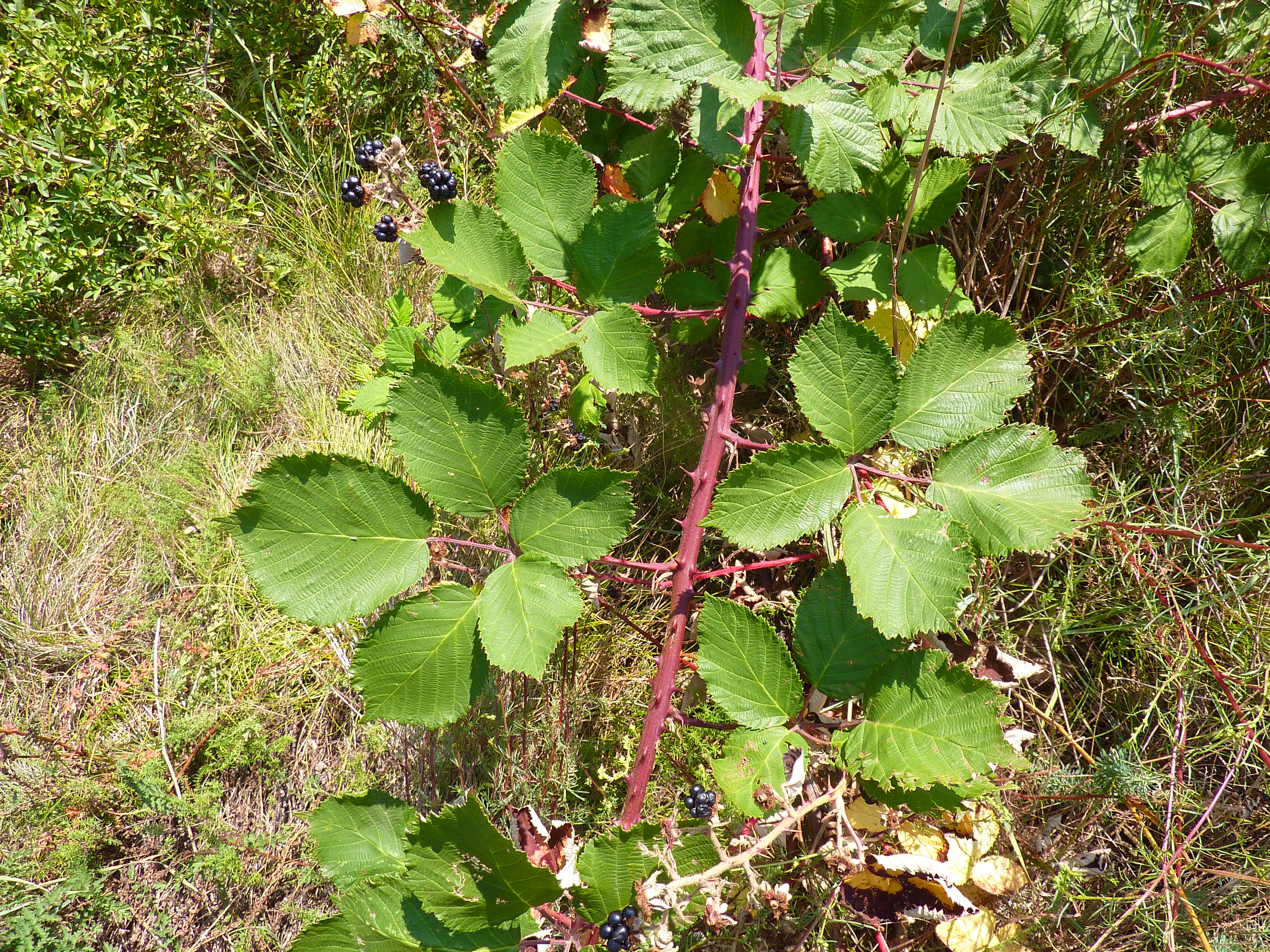
First year stem with leaves with five leaflets

Rubus armeniacus is a perennial plant that bears biennial stems ("canes") from the perennial root system. In its first year a new stem grows vigorously to its full length of 4–10 metres (13–33 ft), trailing along the ground or arching up to 4 m high. The stem is stout, up to 2–3 cm diameter at the base, and green; it is polygonal (usually hexagonal) in cross-section, with stout prickles up to 1.5 cm long forming along the ribs. The canes can turn more red/purple if they are exposed to bright sunlight. This is common in the summer.

The leaves on first-year shoots are 7–20 cm (2.8–7.9 in) long, palmately compound with either three or more commonly five leaflets. The leaflets are moderately serrated. Flowers are not produced on first-year shoots. In its second year, the stem does not grow longer, but produces several side shoots, which bear smaller leaves with three leaflets (rarely a single leaflet). These leaflets are oval-acute, dark green above and pale to whitish below, with a toothed margin, and snaring, hooked thorns along the midrib on the underside. Both first- and second-year shoots are spiny, with short, stout, curved, sharp prickles. Mature plants form a tangle of dense arching stems, the branches rooting from the node tip when they reach the ground. The flowers are produced in late spring and early summer on panicles of 3–20 together on the tips of the second-year side shoots, each flower 2–2.5 cm diameter with five white or pale pink petals. The flowers are bisexual (perfect) containing both male and female reproductive structures. The fruit in botanical terminology is not a berry, but an aggregate fruit of numerous drupelets. It is 1.2–2 cm diameter, ripening black or dark purple.

== Taxonomy ==
Both the scientific name and the species' origin have been the subject of much confusion, with much of the literature referring to it as either Rubus procerus or Rubus discolor, and often mistakenly citing its origin as western European. The Flora of North America, published in 2014, considers the taxonomy unsettled, and tentatively uses the older name Rubus bifrons, but this is now treated by the Plants of the World Online database as a separate, central European species.

== Ecology ==
The fleshy growing cane tips contain the antifeedant compounds, 2-heptanol and methyl salicylate at higher concentrations than mature leaves. At the concentration found in the growing cane tips, 2-heptanol is a banana slug (Ariolimax columbianus) antifeedant. The lack of phytophagous insects observed on the growing cane tips is likely due to the presence of methyl salicylate. This compound is a known aphid repellant and has been shown to attract predators in response to insect herbivory.

=== As an invasive species ===
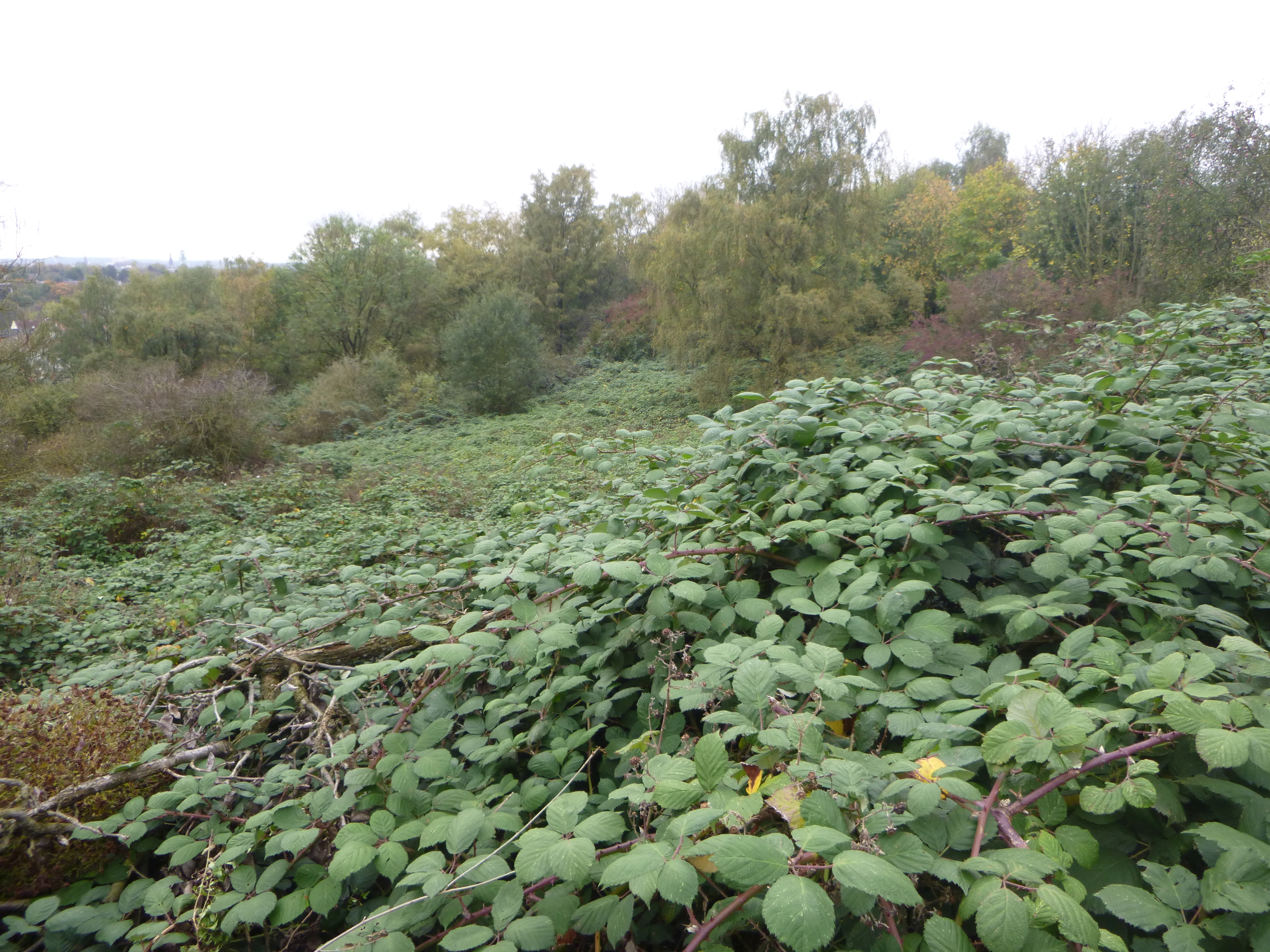
R. armeniacus covering a field in Germany

==== Spread ====
Luther Burbank, who coined the misleading name "Himalayan", introduced R. armeniacus to North America in 1885 in Santa Rosa, California, using seeds that he imported from India. The species thrived in its new environment, notably for the large amount of berries it produced. By 1915, it was widely grown and cultivated in the United States. It soon escaped from cultivation, and became an invasive species in most of the temperate world and the U.S. Pacific Coast by 1945. It is listed as an invasive species in the U.S. State of Missouri and prohibited in the U.S. state of Wisconsin. Because it is so hard to contain, it quickly gets out of control, with birds and other animals eating the fruit and then spreading the seeds. It is highly flammable and a common ladder fuel for wildfires, due to the litter and dead canes produced by the plant.

It is especially established west of the Cascades in the American Pacific Northwest and in parts of southern British Columbia along the coast, in the Lower Mainland, and throughout Vancouver Island. In these regions, it is often the dominant plant found along roadsides and unmaintained open land. It does well in riparian zones due to the abundance of other species in these areas, which allows it to go relatively unnoticed until it has had a chance to establish itself. Unlike other invasive species, this plant can easily establish itself and continue to spread in ecosystems that have not experienced a disturbance.

The plant itself develops large root systems, allowing it to find water from other sources than just the immediate area. It can also hold onto water in its canes, allowing it to thrive more than other plants during dry seasons or droughts. Himalayan blackberries grow very well in sandy, well-drained soil with a lot of natural light, even if the soil is lacking in nutrients. All of the Himalayan blackberry's adaptations to grow in these conditions continue to make it a difficult plant to remove and an invasive species. R. armeniacus is able to survive during drought periods because of their extensive root systems. Not only are their roots spread out over a wide area, they also can go very deep underground, allowing them to reach water most smaller plants and shrubs would not reach. They also store more water in their canes that act like a water reservoir. This added water also allows them to release oxygen and take in more CO_{2} without fearing major losses of water. Since they store water in their canes and roots, they have excess water ready for use or for loss when opening their stomata.

==== Management ====
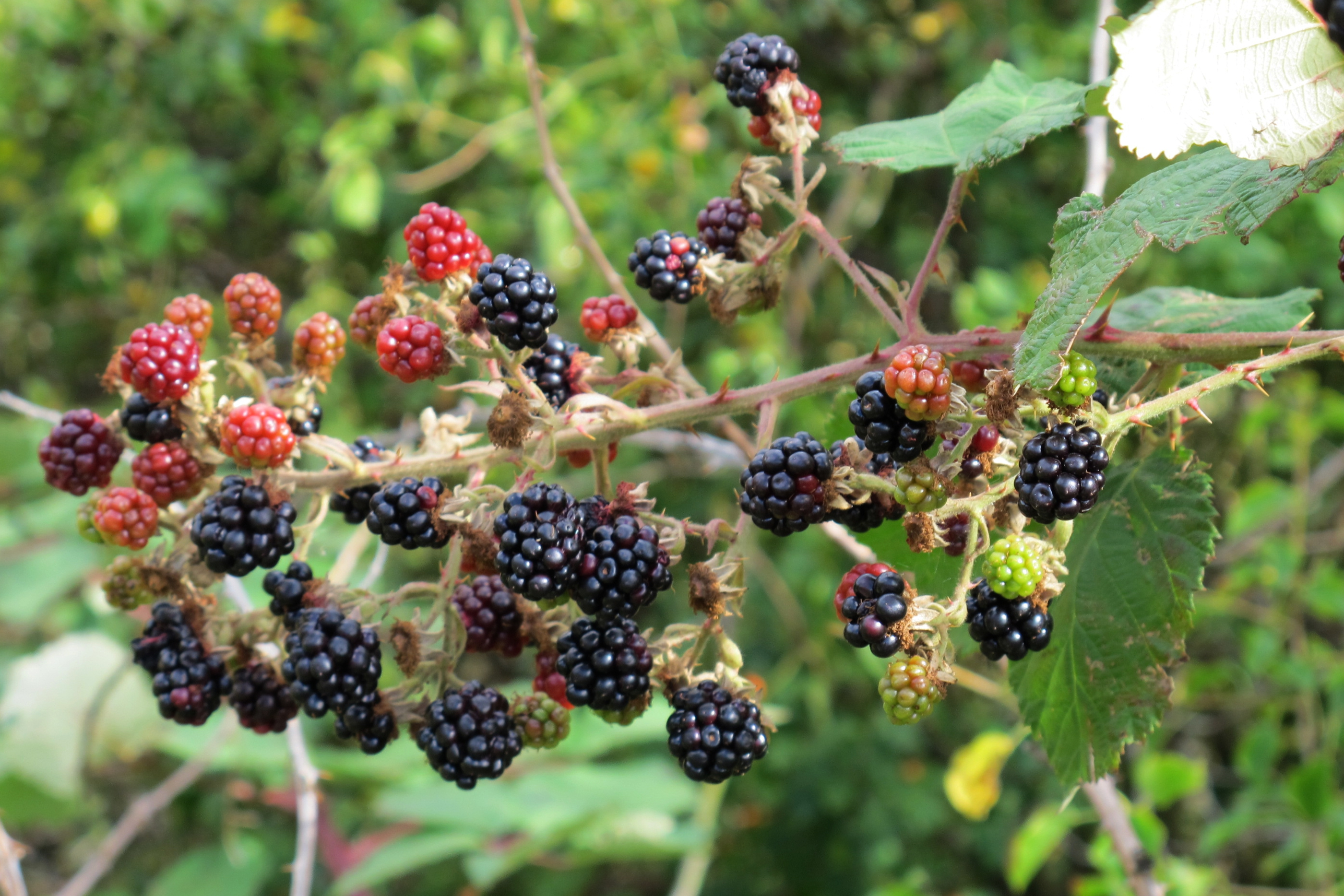
An example of the fruit, showing both ripe and unripe (green then red) fruit.

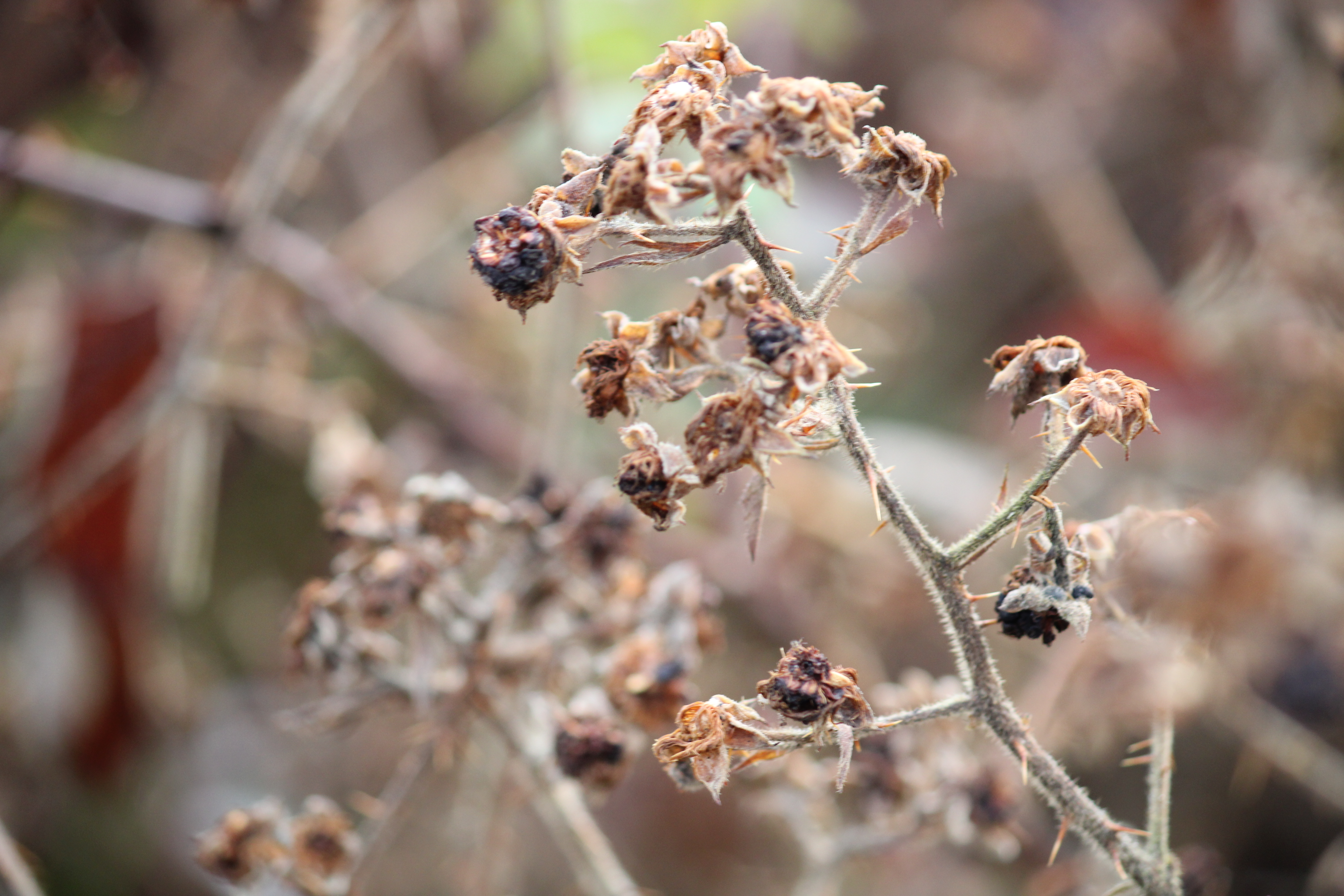
Remnants of berries during winter near Frederikshavn, Denmark

The plant's many means of asexual reproduction make it among the most difficult to control weeds in a home garden or small property management context. Cutting the canes to the ground or burning thickets of R. armeniacus are ineffective removal strategies. The best practices for removal include digging up the rhizomes and connecting underground structures, and herbicides. Broken roots can resprout, making manual removal difficult.

The plant rarely impedes large-scale construction or agricultural practices, since tillage, cutting, and other means of mechanical removal are sufficient to destroy a single generation of plants.

== Cultivation ==
=== Fruit crop ===
The species was probably introduced to Europe in 1835 and to Australia and North America in 1885. It is valued for its edible fruit, similar to that of common blackberries (e.g. Rubus fruticosus) but larger and sweeter, making it a more attractive species for both domestic and commercial fruit production. The immature fruit is smaller, red, and hard with a much more sour taste. The cultivars Himalayan Giant and Theodore Reimers are commonly planted. Rubus armeniacus was used in the development of the marionberry cultivar of blackberry.

=== Cover ===
When established for several years and if left alone, Rubus armeniacus can grow into a large cluster of canes. These thickets can provide good nesting grounds for birds, and help to provide places to rest/hide for other larger mammals, such as rabbits, squirrels, and beavers. While areas with R. armeniacus provide good sources for bird nests, birds in regions where it is a non-native invasive species may prefer areas with more natural/native plants when given the option.
