= Juan Grabowski =

Argentine footballer

Personal information
- Full name: Juan Fernando Grabowski
- Date of birth: 7 May 1985 (age 41)
- Place of birth: Rosario, Argentina
- Height: 1.80 m (5 ft 11 in)
- Position: Centre-back

Youth career
- Rosario Central

Senior career*
Years	Team	Apps	(Gls)
2004–2007	Rosario Central	12	(1)
2006	→ Sarmiento (R) (loan)	4	(1)
2008	Oriente Petrolero	24	(1)
2009	Sportivo Las Parejas	13	(0)
2010	Total Chalaco	32	(2)
2011–2014	Coquimbo Unido	116	(13)
2014–2015	Everton	32	(1)
2015–2016	Unión San Felipe	25	(1)
2016–2018	Sportivo Las Parejas	54	(0)

Managerial career
- 2020: Coquimbo Unido (assistant)
- 2021–2023: Cuniburo (assistant)
- 2024–2025: Vinotinto Ecuador (Note: Club was named Cuniburo until 2024)
- * Club domestic league appearances and goals

Juan Fernando Grabowski (born 9 April 1982) is an Argentine football manager and former player who played as a centre-back.

He played five years in Chile. There, he represented Coquimbo Unido, Everton and Unión San Felipe.
