= Johann Christian Carl Günther =

German botanist and pharmacist (1769–1833)

- Born: 10 October 1769; Jauer, Prussian Silesia (Jawor, Poland)
- Died: 18 January 1833 (aged 63); Breslau, Prussia
- Citizenship: Kingdom of Prussia
- Education: University of Breslau
- Scientific career
- Fields: Botany
- Author abbrev. (botany): Günther

Johann Christian Carl Günther (1769 – 1833) was a German botanist, pharmacist, batologist, and author.

With Theodor Emil Schummel he issued the exsiccata Herbarium vivum plantas in Silesia indigenas exhibens a Christiano Günther et Aemilio Schummel collectum et omnibus botanicis inprimis Silesiae cultoribus ac amicis dicatum (1811-1830). With Heinrich Emanuel Grabowski and Christian Friedrich Heinrich Wimmer he distributed an exsiccata-like series of duplicate specimens called Schlesische Gewächse.
