= Klementyna Grabowska =

Polish pianist and composer

Klementyna Grabowska née Wyganowska (1771–1831) was a Polish pianist and composer. She was born in the Duchy of Poznań and composed for solo piano, two sonatas, variations and polonaises. She was considered a good piano player in her time. She composed several pieces for piano which were published in Warsaw by Brezezina and Poznan by Szymon.

She married Józef Grabowski of Łukowa, and in 1831 moved to Paris where she was giving great concerts. She died there in 1831. Grabowska was also known as Countess Clementine.

== Works ==
Selected works include:

- Sonata, op. 2 in B♭ major for the piano
- Polonaises, collection
