= Janusz Grabowski =

Polish mathematician

Janusz Roman Grabowski
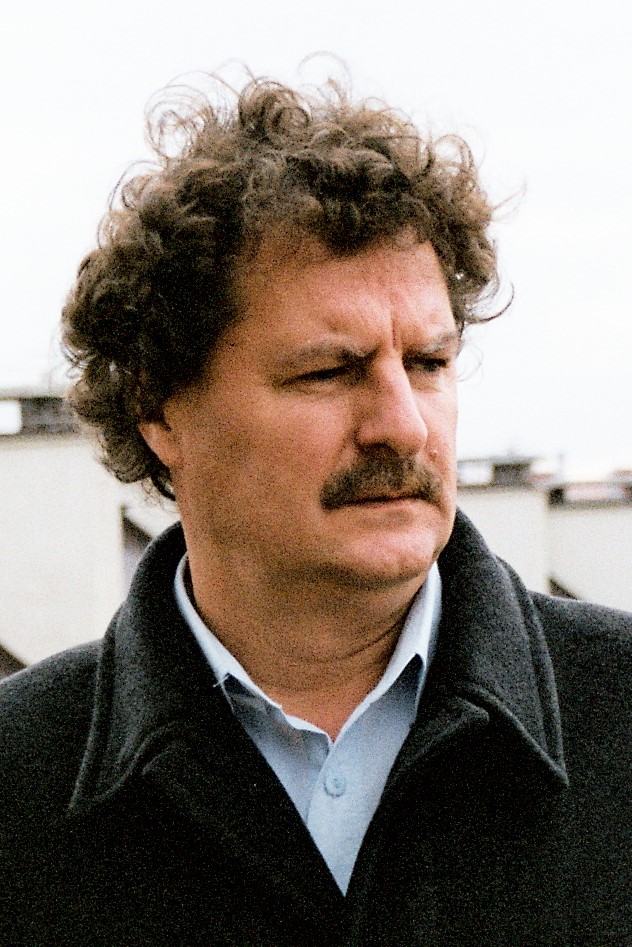
- Born: 30 April 1955 (age 71); Stalowa Wola
- Occupation: Mathematician
- Website: https://www.impan.pl/~jagrab/

Janusz Roman Grabowski (born April 30, 1955 in Stalowa Wola, Poland) is a Polish mathematician working in differential geometry and mathematical methods in classical and quantum physics.

== Scientific career ==
Grabowski earned his MSc degree in mathematics in 1978 at the Faculty of Mathematics, Informatics and Mechanics of the University of Warsaw. His master thesis was awarded the first degree Marcinkowski Prize of the Polish Mathematical Society. In the period of 1978-2001 he worked at the University of Warsaw earning his PhD in 1982 and habilitation in 1993. He was giving courses in Calculus I, II, III, Functional Analysis, Lie algebras and Lie groups, Differential Geometry, etc.

Since 2001 he works in the Institute of Mathematics Polish Academy of Sciences as a full professor and the Head of the Department of Mathematical Physics and Differential Geometry. He is also a member of the Scientific Council of the Institute.

In 1988 and 1989 he was a fellow of the Alexander von Humboldt Foundation. After political changes in Eastern Europe in 1989 he started an intensive international collaboration. He was visiting professor in many European scientific institutions, e.g., the Erwin Schroedinger Institute in Vienna, the University of Naples, the University of Luxembourg, and several Spanish universities and . He acted also as an expert, panel member, and for several years as the chair of the mathematical panel evaluating grants of the European Research Council. He supervised four PhD students.

=== Scientific activity ===
Professor Janusz Grabowski is an author of over 140 publications in top and very good international scientific journals with about 2000 citations indexed in the bases of the Web of Knowledge. Main results of his work include:

1. Important results concerning Lie algebras of vector fields on smooth manifolds;
2. A novel approach to double (and higher) vector bundles which drastically simplifies the theory;
3. Introducing the concepts of graded bundle and homogeneity structure with applications;
4. Defining the concept of general algebroid and the corresponding Lagrangian and Hamiltonian formalisms, including nonholonomic constraints;
5. Results in the theory of Lie systems of differential equations;
6. Vital achievements in the theory of Poisson and Jacobi structures;
7. Geometry of quantum systems;
8. Introducing the concept of $\mathbb{Z}_2^n$-supermanifold and proving fundamental results about their structure;
9. Results in information geometry and applying geometric methods to studying the theory of quantum information and entanglement;
10. A novel approach to contact geometry with applications to analytical mechanics.
