= Halina Grabowski =

Member of the Polish resistance movement in World War II

dressed for a return visit to Warsaw

Halina Matysiak Grabowski (29 January 1928–23 April 2003) was a member of the Polish resistance movement in World War II. At the age of 16 she fought in the Warsaw Uprising against the German occupation of Warsaw.

== Life ==
Halina Grabowski was born on 29 January 1928, in Warsaw. Aged 16, she served as a nurse, messenger and combatant in the Warsaw Uprising. She was wounded, and became a prisoner of war.

She met her husband, George Grabowski, in Germany and married him in England on 2 October 1948. In 1952 they moved to Cleveland, Ohio. She died on 23 April 2003, in Independence, Ohio.

Grabowski was awarded four medals by the Polish Government at a ceremony in Cleveland. She was also awarded the Armia Krajowa Cross.
