= Robert Grabowski =

Robert Casimer "Bebob" Grabowski, M.M.Ed., FIU 1991, B.M., UM 1979, (born June 21, 1956 in Pittsburgh, Pennsylvania), is an American educator, author, bassist, jazz historian, diver and underwater photographer in the Florida Keys. He was named number three in the Miami New Times list of Miami's Top Ten Jazz Musicians.

== Career ==
Grabowski has been adjunct professor in jazz studies at Florida International University for over two decades, writing the text for the course, The Evolution of Jazz In America. He produced the FIU Jazz Festival for ten years, featuring such artists as David Sanborn and Maynard Ferguson. He is a writer, composer, and producer in his own right, recording seven CDs, the latest in 2012, Ballads and Other Moments of Joy. He has recorded Live at the Kennedy Center with Alan Harris, and in the studio with Melton Mustafa, and Ira Sullivan. Grabowski is a radio personality, having hosted Monday Night Jazz on WLRN-FM, the NPR affiliate for South Florida for two years, receiving notoriety for his involvement in the controversy over replacing live jazz announcers with an automated feed.
