= Michał Grabowski (author) =

Polish author (1804–1863)

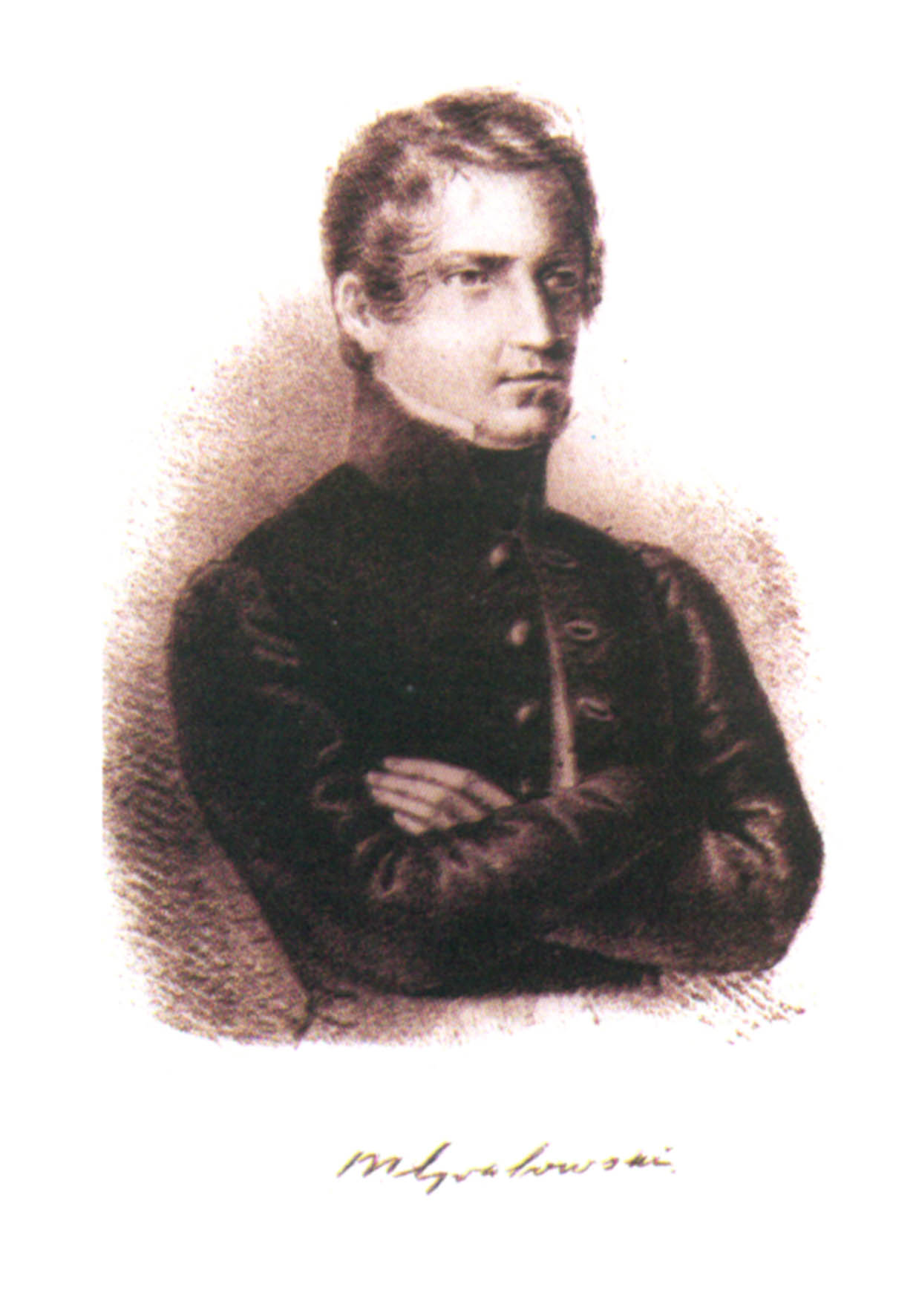
- Born: 25 September 1804; Volhynia
- Died: 19 November 1863 (aged 59); Warsaw, Poland
- Occupation: Author

Michał Grabowski, born 25 September 1804 in Złotyjów, Volhynia, died 19 November 1863 in Warsaw, was a Polish author.

Grabowski was a director of the "enlightment commission" (education system) in Warsaw.
