= Natalia Kicka =

Polish archaeologist and numismatist

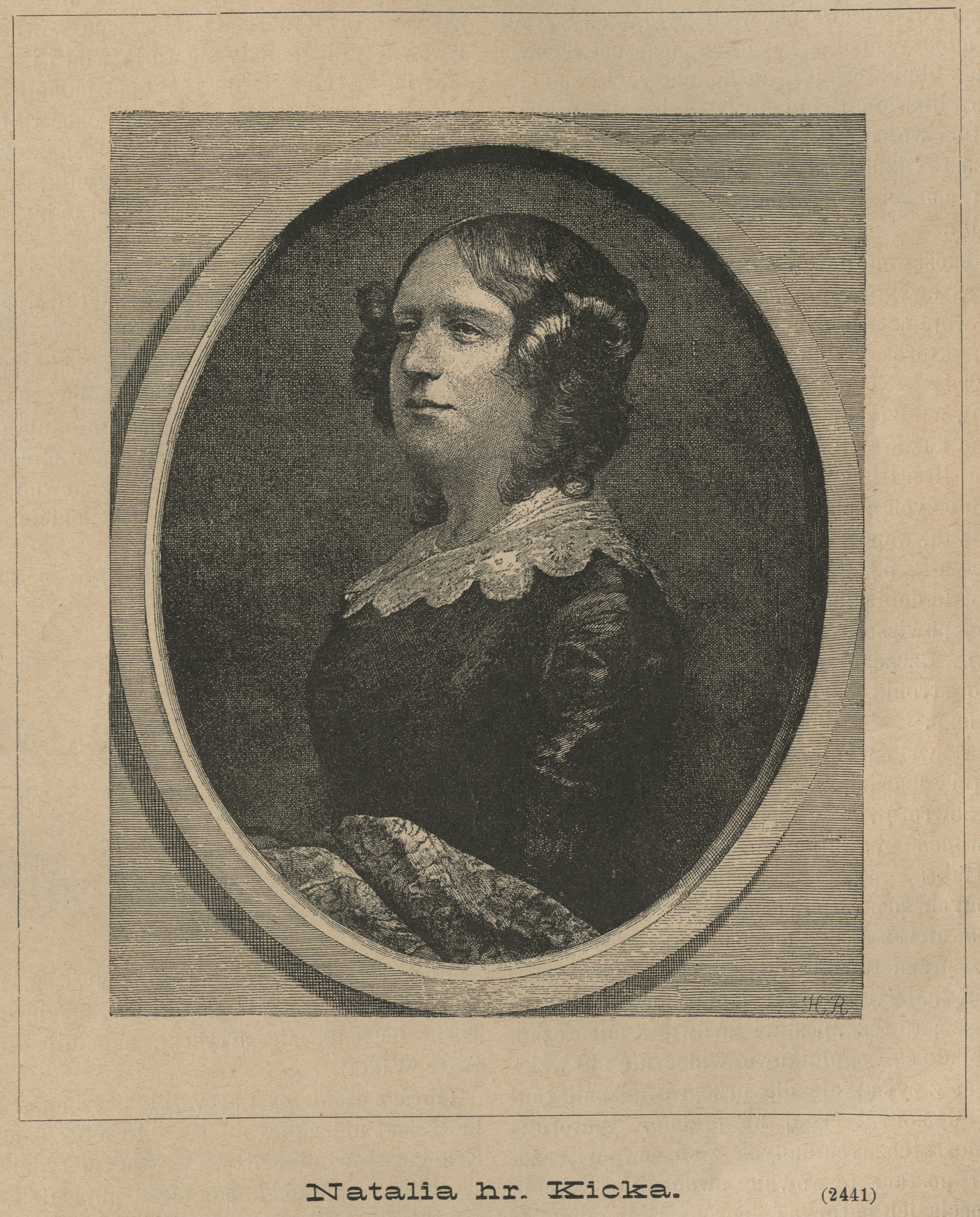
- Born: August 6, 1806; Vilnius, Russian Empire
- Died: April 4, 1888 (aged 86–87); Warsaw, Russian Empire

Natalia Anna Kicka (6 August 1806–4 April 1888) was a Polish archaeologist, numismatist and social activist.

== Biography ==
Natalia Anna Kicka was born as the eldest of four daughters to Piotr Bisping, marshal of Wołkowysk and Józefa Kicka and grew up on a family estate in Hołowczyce.

Kicka collected coins and medals and worked with several pioneers of the numismatic movement in Poland, especially Karol Beyer, Emeryk Huten-Czapski and Kazimierz Strończyński. In the 1870s she conducted archaeological excavations in Kujawy on the so-called Kuyavian Pyramids.

She married Ludwik Kicki, in January 1831. He died in the same year at the Battle of Ostrołęka (1831). Her memoirs are a valuable historical source for the November Uprising. Kicka is buried at the Powązki Cemetery in Warsaw.

== Memoirs ==
- Pamiętniki; wstęp i przypisy Józef Dutkiewicz; tekst opracowal, przypisy uzupełnił oraz indeksy sporządził Tadeusz Szafrański. Warsaw: Instytut Wydawniczy “Pax”, 1972
