= Gene Grabowski (communications strategist) =

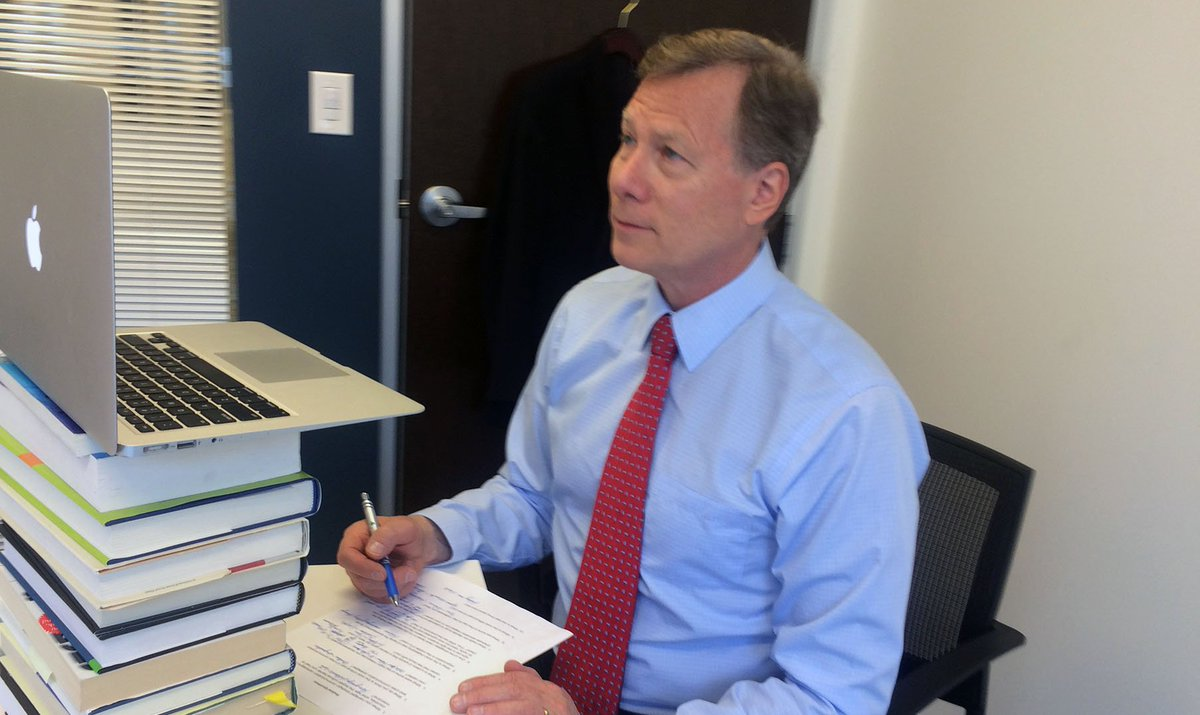
- Gene Grabowski
- Born: Pittsburgh, Pennsylvania
- Education: University of Pittsburgh, University of Michigan
- Occupation: Crisis communications strategist

Gene Grabowski (born 1954) is an American former journalist and crisis communications specialist.

== Early life and education ==
Originally from Pittsburgh, Pennsylvania, Grabowski earned a BA in Writing and History at the University of Pittsburgh. He later did graduate work in management at the University of Michigan.

== Career ==
Grabowski began his career in communications as a reporter, working primarily in Washington, D.C. He covered congressional issues for the Associated Press and served as a White House reporter for The Washington Times and as Manager of Press Information at C-SPAN. Grabowski left The Washington Times in protest after a disagreement over an article in the publication regarding then Democratic presidential nominee Michael S. Dukakis and medical information.

Grabowski's career in public relations has involved many food industry crises, including the 2015 Chipotle Mexican Grill E. coli outbreak, 2015 Blue Bell Listeria scare, and 2007 Pet Food Crisis. He has also appeared as himself, the Vice President of the Grocery Manufacturers of America, in the documentary Super Size Me. Grabowski has been a guest on ESPN's Mike & Mike morning show as a public relations expert for his client Roger Clemens after a media crisis.

== Awards ==
In 2007, Grabowski was named PR News Crisis Manager of the Year for his work on various campaigns, including the litigation struggle of the Kuwaiti detainees in Guantanamo Bay, Cuba, the 2007 Hasbro response to the global lead paint toy scare, and the North American recalls of pet food.
