= Martha Grabowski =

American expert on organizational risk

Martha R. Grabowski is an American expert on organizational risk, particularly in maritime operations. She is currently a Distinguished Research Scientist at Rensselaer Polytechnic Institute, Department of Industrial and Systems Engineering. She is a Professor Emerita of Information Systems in the Madden College of Business and Economics at Le Moyne College in DeWitt, New York, where she held the McDevitt distinguished chair in information systems and directed the information systems program.

== Education and career ==
Grabowski graduated from the United States Merchant Marine Academy in 1979. She attended Rensselaer Polytechnic Institute for graduate study in management information systems, earning an M.B.A. in 1982, an M.S. in 1983, and a Ph.D. in 1987.

She became an assistant professor at Le Moyne college in 1987. She was promoted to associate professor in 1992 and full professor in 1998. She held the Joseph C. Georg Endowed Professorship from 1994 to 1997, served as acting chair of accounting in 2003 and 2003, chaired the Business Administration Department from 2009 to 2012, and chaired the Accounting Department again beginning in 2020. She held the McDevitt Chair from 2012 to 2024.

Grabowski has served two terms as chair of the National Academies of Sciences, Engineering and Medicine Marine Board, 2006-2008, and 2020-2022, and has chaired or served on ten National Academies of Sciences, Engineering and Medicine studies.

== Recognition ==
Grabowski was elected to the National Academy of Engineering in 2024, "for her work on engineering information systems that promote transportation safety and for national leadership in marine transportation policy".
