= Maciej Grabowski =

Maciej Grabowski may refer to:

- Maciej Grabowski (economist) (born 1959), Polish economist and politician
- Maciej Grabowski (nobleman) (died 1750), Polish-Lithuanian nobleman and politician
- Maciej Grabowski (sailor) (born 1978), Polish Olympic sailor
