= Zygmunt Grabowski =

Polish painter

- Born: 13 August 1891; Lublin, Poland
- Died: 19 September 1939 (aged 48); Brest, Belarus
- Occupation: Painter

Zygmunt Grabowski (13 August 1891 – 19 September 1939) was a Polish painter. His work was part of the painting event in the art competition at the 1936 Summer Olympics.
