= Szydłowo =

Szydłowo may refer to the following places:

- Szydłowo, Gniezno County in Greater Poland Voivodeship (west-central Poland)
- Szydłowo, Piła County in Greater Poland Voivodeship (west-central Poland)
- Szydłowo, Masovian Voivodeship (east-central Poland)
