= Jedrek Grabowski =

English professional wrestler

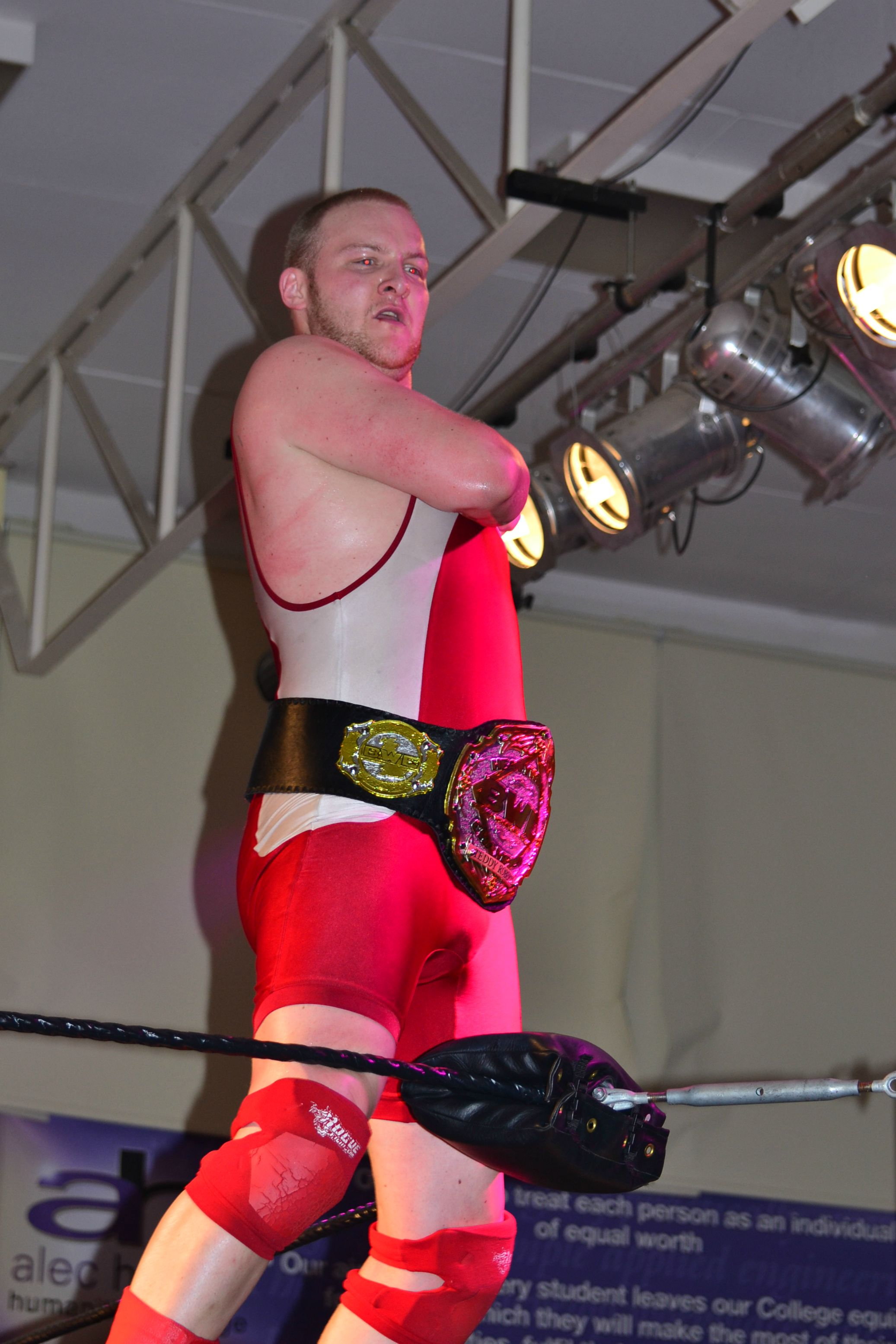
- Jedrek Grabowski 24 September 2011, having won the BWE World Heavyweight Championship

Personal information
- Born: Jonathan Ellis; 4 April 1982 (age 44) Essex, England

Professional wrestling career
- Ring name(s): Jedrek Grabowski; Hooilgan Number One; FUG
- Billed height: 6 ft 9 in (2.06 m)
- Billed weight: 300 lb (140 kg)
- Billed from: East London, England; Essex, England
- Trained by: Greg Burridge; Garry Vanderhorne
- Debut: April 2010

Jonathan Ellis (born 4 April 1982) is an English professional wrestler, better known by his ring name Jedrek Grabowski. He competes for promotions including Lucha Britannia, PROGRESS Wrestling, Future Pro Wrestling (FPW) and previously competed for the now defunct British Wrestling Evolution (BWE)

== Professional wrestling career ==
In 2010 Ellis began training at the London School of Lucha Libre. Ellis made his debut with BWE under the name Jedrek Grabowski in April 2010.

In January 2011 Ellis took part in the TNA Gut Check in London.

On 24 September 2011 as Jedrek Grabowski, Ellis won the BWE World Heavyweight Championship in a fatal fourway match defeating Teddy Roberts(c) Ho Ho Lun & Turbo. Jonathan currently performs at Lucha Britannia as part of the tag team Los Hooligans with Loco Mike Mason

In 2013 Ellis debuted as Fug for PROGRESS Wrestling as the bodyguard of Nathan Cruz and also debuted for Future Pro Wrestling (FPW) as the bodyguard of Douglas Douglas Rocafella.

== Championships and accomplishments ==
- British Wrestling Evolution
  - BWE World Heavyweight Champion (1 time, current).
  - Lucha Britannia Champion (2 time).
