= Jan Jerzy Grabowski =

Polish general, noble, and marshal

Jan Jerzy Grabowski (before 1767 – 1789) of the Topór coat of arms was a Polish noble, general (from 1782), marshal of the Słuck Confederation (1767).

He was twice married: first to Joanna Gruszczyńska and secondly to Elżbieta Szydłowska. Some of the children of his second marriage are thought to have actually been children of the last Polish–Lithuanian Commonwealth king, Stanisław August Poniatowski, whose mistress Elżbieta was.

Grabowski was one of the few Calvinist politicians of modern Poland.
