= Izabela Grabowska (sociologist) =

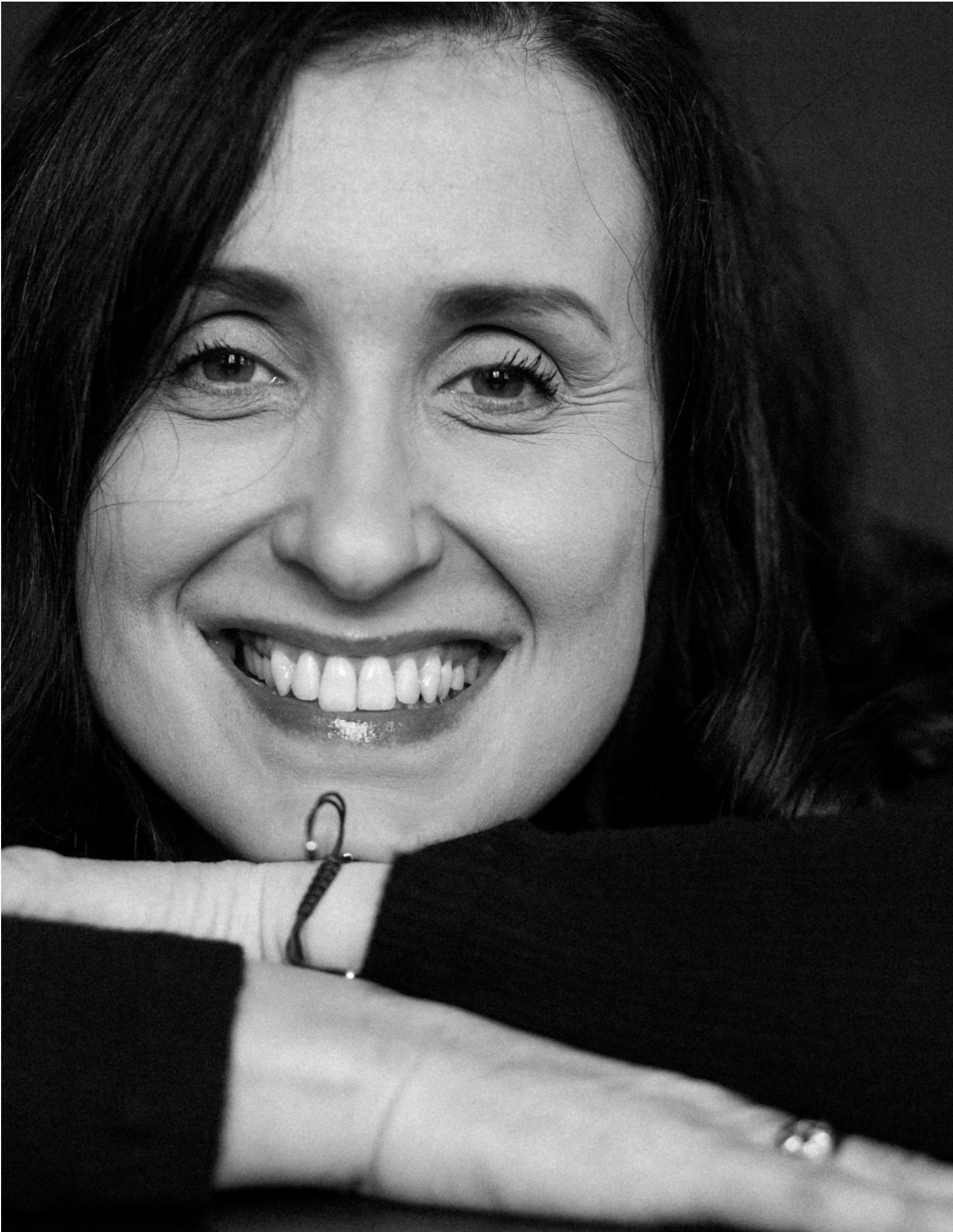
- Education: University of Wrocław; University College Dublin; University of Warsaw
- Occupations: Sociologist; Economist
- Employers: Kozminski University; SWPS University; University of Warsaw
- Known for: Migration studies; Social remittances; Human capital transfer; Labour migration; Skills of migrants; Return migration; Liquid integration
- Website: www.izabelagrabowska.org

Izabela Grabowska is a Polish sociologist and economist recognized for her research on human mobility, labour migration, social remittances, and the impact of migration on social change. She is a Full Professor of Social Sciences at Kozminski University, where she founded and directs the CRASH Center for Research on Social Change and Human Mobility.

Her work analyses the intersection of migration, labour markets, and human capital. She has contributed to the concept of "social remittances," which explains how migrants transfer informal human capital, skills, and social practices. She has authored and co-authored numerous academic works, including the monographs Migrants as Agents of Change (2017) and The Impact of Migration on Poland (2018).

Grabowska has served as a national expert for the European Commission, the European Labour Authority, and other public bodies. In 2023, she was appointed Scientific Coordinator for the Horizon Europe research project Link4Skills. She is also a co-author of European University Alliance EUonAIR: AI in Curricula, Smart UniverCity and Return Mobility. In 2025 she has been awarded Fernard Braudel Senior Fellowship at European University Institute in Florence.

== Education ==
Grabowska earned a master's degree in sociology from the University of Wrocław, a master's degree in economic sciences from University College Dublin. She subsequently received her PhD from the Department of Economics at the University of Warsaw.

== Career ==
Grabowska was a senior member of the Centre of Migration Research (CMR) at the University of Warsaw from 2002 to 2018 and remains on its Scientific Board. Concurrently, she served on the executive board and Board of Directors of the IMISCOE (International Migration, Integration and Social Cohesion in Europe) research network from 2008 to 2018.

From 2016 to 2021, Grabowska was a professor at SWPS University in Warsaw. There, she served as Director of the Interdisciplinary Doctoral School and was the founder and leader of the Youth Research Center (2015–2019).

In September 2021, she was appointed Full Professor of Social Sciences at Kozminski University. At Kozminski, she founded the CRASH Center for Research on Social Change and Human Mobility and serves as its director.

=== Research ===
Grabowska's research focuses on international labour migration. Her work develops the concept of social remittances—the transfer of non-financial assets like skills, practices, values and norms by migrants—and analyzes its role in fostering social change in Central and Eastern Europe. She also investigates migrant careers, skills of migrants, human resources of migrants and labour market integration.

The author of over 60 scholarly publications, Grabowska's research has been supported by competitive grants from the European Union's Horizon Europe (Link4Skills) and Horizon 2020 (MIMY) programmes. She has also secured multiple grants from the National Science Centre of Poland, including OPUS, DAINA, Sonata Bis, Harmonia, and KBM.

As Scientific Coordinator of the Horizon Europe Link4Skills project, she heads a global consortium focused on mobility and skills. She is also a co-creator and the first Principal Investigator of the European University Alliance EUonAIR, an initiative centered on AI in curricula and (return) mobility.

Since January 2023, she is an elected member of the Scientific Board of the Institute of Philosophy and Sociology of the Polish Academy of Sciences.

== Selected publications ==
=== Monographs and edited volumes ===
- Grabowska, I., Kyliushyk, I., Chról, E. (2025). Ukrainian Female War Migrants: Mobilising Resources for Prospective Social Remittances. Routledge
- Grabowska, I., & Jastrzebowska, A. (2022). Migration and the Transfer of Informal Human Capital: Insights from Central Europe and Mexico. Routledge.
- White, A., Grabowska, I., Kaczmarczyk, P., & Slany, K. (2018). The Impact of Migration on Poland: EU Mobility and Social Change. UCL Press.
- Grabowska, I., Garapich, M. P., Jazwinska, E., & Radziwinowiczowna, A. (2017). Migrants as Agents of Change: Social Remittances in an Enlarged European Union. Palgrave Macmillan.
- Glorius, B., Grabowska-Lusińska, I., & Kuvik, A. (Eds.). (2013). Mobility in Transition: Migration Patterns After EU Enlargement. Amsterdam University Press.
- Grabowska-Lusińska, I. (2012). Migrantów ścieżki zawodowe bez granic [Migrants' Professional Paths Without Borders]. Wydawnictwo Naukowe Scholar.
- Grabowska-Lusińska, I., & Okólski, M. (2009). Emigracja ostatnia? [The Last Emigration?]. Wydawnictwo Naukowe Scholar.

=== Selected journal articles ===
- Grabowska, I. (2018). Social skills, workplaces and social remittances: a case of post-accession migrants. Work, Employment and Society, 32(5), 868–886.
- Grabowska, I., & Garapich, M. P. (2016). Social remittances and intra-EU mobility: non-financial transfers between U.K. and Poland. Journal of Ethnic and Migration Studies, 42(13), 2146–2162.
- Engbersen, G., Leerkes, A., Grabowska-Lusińska, I., Snel, E., & Burgers, J. (2013). On the differential attachments of migrants from Central and Eastern Europe: A typology of labour migration. Journal of Ethnic and Migration Studies, 39(6), 959–981.
- White, A., & Grabowska, I. (2019). Social remittances and social change in Central and Eastern Europe: embedding migration in the study of society. Central and Eastern European Migration Review, 8(1), 33–50.
- Grabowska, I. (2023). Societal dangers of migrant crisis narratives with a special focus on Belarussian and Ukrainian borders with Poland. Frontiers in Sociology, 7, 1084732.
- Grabowska, I., & Ryan, L. (2024). Return migration and embedding: through the lens of Brexit as an unsettling event. Comparative Migration Studies, 12(1), 6.
- Grabowska, I., Hansen, C., Jastrzebowska, A. et al. Young migrants, "integration" and the local: critical reflections from European stakeholders. Comparative Migration Studies 13, 43 (2025). https://doi.org/10.1186/s40878-025-00454-y
