= Christian Friedrich Heinrich Wimmer =

German botanist and educator (1803–1868)

Christian Friedrich Heinrich Wimmer (October 30, 1803 – March 12, 1868) was a German botanist and educator who was a native of Breslau.

From 1821 he studied philology and natural sciences at the University of Breslau, and after completion of studies, taught classes at Friedrichs gymnasium in Breslau. In 1835 he received the title of professor, and from 1863 served as a Schulrat (education official). He was author of several publications on Silesian flora, and specialized in the study of the willow genus Salix. With Ernst Krause (? –1858) he distributed the exsiccata Herbarium Salicum, Sammlung getrockneter Weidenarten, Abarten und Bastarde zunächst in Schlesien (1849–1857) followd up by Collectio Salicum Europaearum (1858). The series was continued after Wimmer´s death under the title Salices Wimmeri relictae. With Johann Christian Carl Günther and Heinrich Emanuel Grabowski he distributed the exsiccata-like series of duplicate specimens called Schlesische Gewächse. The plant genus Wimmeria within the family Celastraceae is named after him.

In 1854–62 Wimmer published an edition on the ancient Greek naturalist Theophrastus, titled "Theophrasti Eresii Opera quae supersunt omnia".

== Selected writings ==
- Flora Silesiae (Silesian flora), with Heinrich Emanuel Grabowski (2 volumes, 1827–29).
- Flora von Schlesien (Flora of Silesia), 1832.
- Phytologiae Aristotelicae fragmenta, 1838.
- Flora von Schlesien preußischen und österreichischen Antheils (Flora of Silesian, Prussian and Austrian Antheils), 1840; second edition, 1844; third edition, 1857.
- Theophrasti Eresii Opera quae supersunt omnia (3 volumes, 1854–62).
- Salices europaeae, 1866.
