= Heinrich Emanuel Grabowski =

German botanist and pharmacist (1792–1842)

Heinrich Emanuel Grabowski (11 July 1792 – 1 October 1842) was a German botanist and pharmacist of Polish heritage. He was a native of Leobschütz (today known as Glubczyce, Poland).

He studied pharmacy as an apprentice in Breslau (Wrocław), and from 1824 until 1840 was manager of his own pharmacy in Oppeln (Opole). He is remembered for his investigations of Silesian flora, and also for his studies of fossil flora found in the Oppeln region of Silesia (Opole Silesia). The botanical genus Grabowskia (Schltdl., 1832) is named after him, as is the species Rubus grabowskii.

With German botanist Christian Friedrich Heinrich Wimmer (1803-1868), he was the author of Flora Silesiae, a three-part work on Silesian flora that was published in two volumes (1827–29). With Johann Christian Carl Günther and C. F. H. Wimmer he distributed an exsiccata-like series of duplicate specimens called Schlesische Gewächse.
