= Elżbieta Szydłowska =

Polish noblewoman (1748–1810)

- Noblewoman
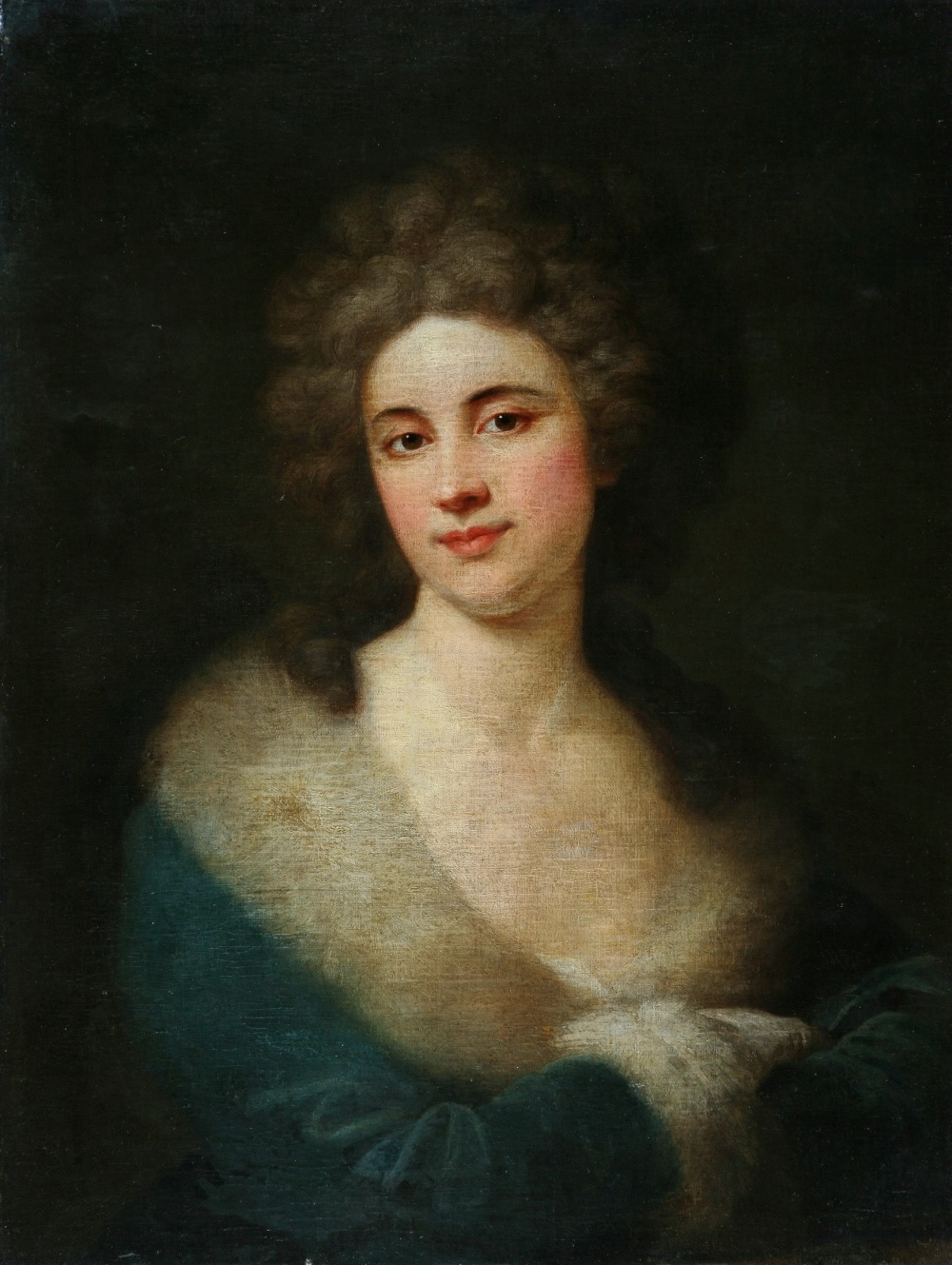
- Portrait by Giovanni Battista Lampi

Polish and Lithuanian royal consort (disputed)
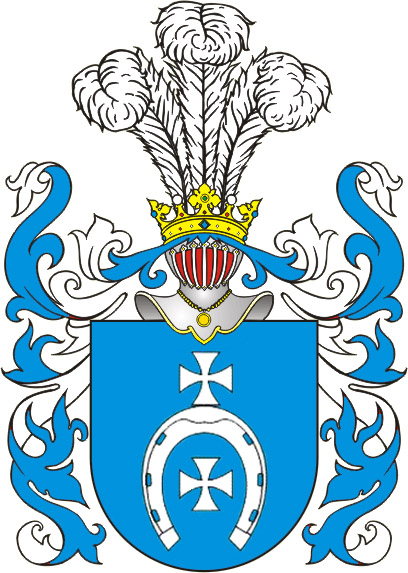
- Coat of arms: Lubicz
- Tenure: 1785 – 1795 (allegedly)
- Born: 1748
- Died: 1 June 1810 (aged 61–62); Warsaw, Poland
- Noble family: Szydłowski family
- Spouses: Jan Jerzy Grabowski (m. 1769; died 1789); Stanisław August Poniatowski (disputed) (m. 1785?; died 1798)
- Father: Teodor Szydłowski
- Mother: Teresa Witkowska h. Nowina

Elżbieta Szydłowska, married surname Grabowska (1748 – 1 June 1810), was a member of the Polish nobility, a mistress and possibly the morganatic wife of the last King of Poland and Grand Duke of Lithuania, Stanisław August Poniatowski.

== Biography ==
Elżbieta Szydłowska was a daughter of Polish nobleman Teodor Kajetan Szydłowski, voivode of Płock, Lubicz coat of arms (1714–1792), and his wife, Teresa Witkowska, Nowina coat of arms (1722–1778). In 1768 she married a Polish noble, General Jan Jerzy Grabowski (died 1789). While all children from this marriage were legalny recognized by her husband as his own, some (if not all) of them are presumed to have actually been children of the last Polish–Lithuanian Commonwealth king, Stanisław August Poniatowski.

=== Possible marriage with the King ===
Stanisław Wasylewski based on reports by diarists and genealogists, claimed there existed the wedding document that says Elżbieta and King Stanisław married in 1785; however the document is now missing and, if authentic, would mean Elżbieta committed bigamy. In 1789 Grabowski died, leaving Elżbieta free to remarry, but if any marriage ever took place between her and the monarch (whether before or after the death of her first husband), it was never publicly announced. Jerzy Besala speculates that if Stanisław indeed married his mistress, he might have wanted to keep it secret to avoid potential unrest among nobles, as happened before in Polish history when ruler was committing mésalliance, like in cases of Casimir the Great and Krystyna of Praga, Władysław Jagiełło and Elisabeth of Pilica, or Sigismund August and Barbara Radziwiłł.

Wirydianna Fiszerowa, a contemporary who knew her, reported that tales of this marriage only circulated after Poniatowski's death, and were spread about by Elżbieta herself, but were not generally believed.

Szydłowska was thought to have exercised some influence on the king during his reign perceived as negative, which made her unpopular.

=== Fall of the kingdom ===
In 1795, King Stanisław abdicated following the Third Partition of Poland, and lived in Grodno under Russian watch until, in 1796, Paul I of Russia invited him to Saint Petersburg. Elżbieta, with her two sons, Stanisław and Michał, took the king to Saint Petersburg to care for him there, and she lived with him until his sudden death in 1798. Afterwards, she returned to Warsaw, then under Prussian rule following the Partitions, where she became a patroness of the Tableau vivant there. She died in Warsaw on 1 June 1810, survived by four of her children.

== Issue ==
She had several children (presumably by the King, though officially acknowledged by Grabowski), and her second son, Michał Grabowski, distinguished himself in combat, eventually becoming a general in the army of the Duchy of Warsaw. Her children were:

- Stanisław
- Michał
- Casimir
- Aleksandra (13 April 1771 – 12 May 1789), who married Franciszek Salezy Krasicki in 1787
- Izabela Grabowska (1776–1858), who married Walenty Faustyn Sobolewski in 1795
- Constance
