= Poniatowski (surname) =

Poniatowski (masculine; feminine: Poniatowska; plural: Poniatowscy) is a Polish surname. It may also be transliterated via Russian language (due to parts of Poland being annexed to the Russian Empire) as Ponyatovsky, Ponyatovskiy or Ponyatovski (feminine: Ponyatovskaya).

Notable people with this surname include members of the Polish noble Poniatowski family and other people:

- Andrzej Poniatowski (1735–1773), Polish nobleman and military commander
- Axel Poniatowski (born 1951), French politician
- Bernard Poniatowski (born 1939), Canadian politician
- Bogdan Poniatowski (1931–2014), Polish rower
- Dionizy Poniatowski (1750–1811), Polish military commander
- Elena Poniatowska (born 1932), Mexican journalist, author and professor
- Izabella Poniatowska (1730–1801), Polish noblewoman, sister of Stanisław August
- Józef Poniatowski (1763–1813), Polish military commander, Marshal of the Empire
- Józef Michał Poniatowski (1814–1873), Polish composer and an operatic tenor
- Józef Stanisław Poniatowski (1835–1908), Polish nobleman, son of Jozef Michal
- Kazimierz Poniatowski (1721–1800), Polish nobility and military commander
- Konstancja Poniatowska (1759–1830), Polish noblewoman, niece of Stanisław August
- Ladislas Poniatowski (born 1946), French politician
- Ludwika Maria Poniatowska (1728–1781), Polish noblewoman, sister of Stanisław August
- Maria Teresa Poniatowska (1760–1834), Polish noblewoman, niece of Stanisław August
- Michał Jerzy Poniatowski (1736–1794), Polish nobleman
- Michel Poniatowski (1922–2002), French politician
- Stanisław Poniatowski (1676–1762), Polish military commander, diplomat, and noble
- Stanisław Poniatowski (1754–1833), Polish nobleman, politician and diplomat
- Stanisław August Poniatowski (1732–1798), King of Poland, brother of Izabella and Ludwika
