= August Aleksander Czartoryski =

Polish noble (1697–1782)

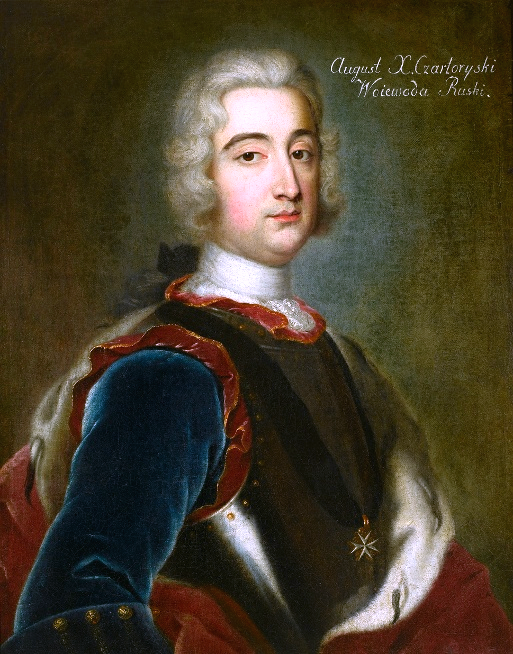
- Portrait, 1720s
- Born: 9 November 1697; Warsaw, Poland
- Died: 4 April 1782 (aged 84); Warsaw, Poland
- Noble family: Czartoryski
- Spouse: Maria Zofia Sieniawska
- Issue: Elżbieta Czartoryska; Adam Kazimierz Czartoryski; Stanisław Czartoryski
- Father: Kazimierz Czartoryski
- Mother: Izabela Elżbieta Morsztyn

Prince August Aleksander Czartoryski (9 November 1697, Warsaw – 4 April 1782, Warsaw) was a Polish szlachcic (nobleman) and magnate.

== Life ==
August became major-general of the Polish Army in 1729, voivode of the Ruthenian Voivodeship in 1731, general starost of Podolia in 1750–1758, and a Knight of Malta. He was starost of Warsaw, Kościerzyna, Lubochnia, Kałusz, Latowicz, Lucyn, Wąwolnica, Kupiski and Pieniań.

He supported Stanisław Leszczyński during the War of the Polish Succession. During the reign of August III, with his brother Michał, Czartoryski was a leader of the "Familia." During the interregnum of 1763–64, he strove for the Polish crown for himself, later for his son Adam Kazimierz. From 1764 to 1766, he was marshal of the General Confederation (Polish: konfederacja generalna); from 1764, a commander for the Crown. He was a supporter of political reforms during the Republic, and an opponent of the Radom Confederation.

== Awards ==
- Knight of the White Eagle Order, awarded 23 July 1731
- Knight of the Order of Saint Stanislaus
- Order of Saint Andrzej

== Ancestry ==
Ancestors of August Aleksander Czartoryski

8. Prince Mikołaj Jerzy Czartoryski
4. Michał Jerzy, Prince Czartoryski
9. Princess Izabela Korecka
2. Kazimierz, Prince Czartoryski
10. Tomasz Olędzki
5. Joanna Weronika Olędzka
11. Anny Grzybowska
1. August Aleksander, Prince Czartoryski
12. Count Mikołaj Daniłowicz
6. Count Jan Andrzej Morsztyn
13. Helena Uchańska
3. Countess Izabela Elżbieta Morsztyn
14. George Gordon, 2nd Marquess of Huntly
7. Lady Catherine Gordon of Huntly
15. Lady Anne Campbell
