= Morsztyn =

Czapski coat of arms variant of Leliwa coat of arms used by some of Morsztyn family

Morsztyn is a Polish surname. Archaic feminine forms are Morsztynowa (by husband), Morsztynówna (by father); they still can be used colloquially. Some of them use Leliwa coat of arms, see also pl:Morsztyn Hrabia. Notable people with this surname include the following:

- Hieronim Morsztyn (ca.1581-1623), Polish poet
- Izabela Elżbieta Morsztyn (1671–1756), Polish noblewoman
- Jan Andrzej Morsztyn (1621–1693), Polish poet, starosta of Zawichost, Tymbark and Kowal
- Krzysztof Morsztyn Jr. (c.1580 – 1642), Polish nobleman, educator, starosta of Filipów and Przewałka
- Krzysztof Morsztyn Sr. (1522–1600), founder of the Polish Brethren community in Filipów
- Zbigniew Morsztyn (1627–1689), Polish poet

== See also ==
- Ludwik Hieronim Morstin (1886–1966), Polish soldier, diplomat, editor and poet.
- Morstein
