= Konstancja Czartoryska =

Konstancja Czartoryska may refer to:

- Konstancja Czartoryska (1700–1759), Polish noblewoman
- Konstancja Czartoryska (1729–1749), Polish noblewoman, daughter of Michał Fryderyk Czartoryski
- Konstancja Czartoryska (1742–1797), Polish noblewoman, mother of Stanisław Kostka Zamoyski
