= Jan Klemens Branicki =

Polish nobleman (1689–1771)

Count Jan Klemens Branicki
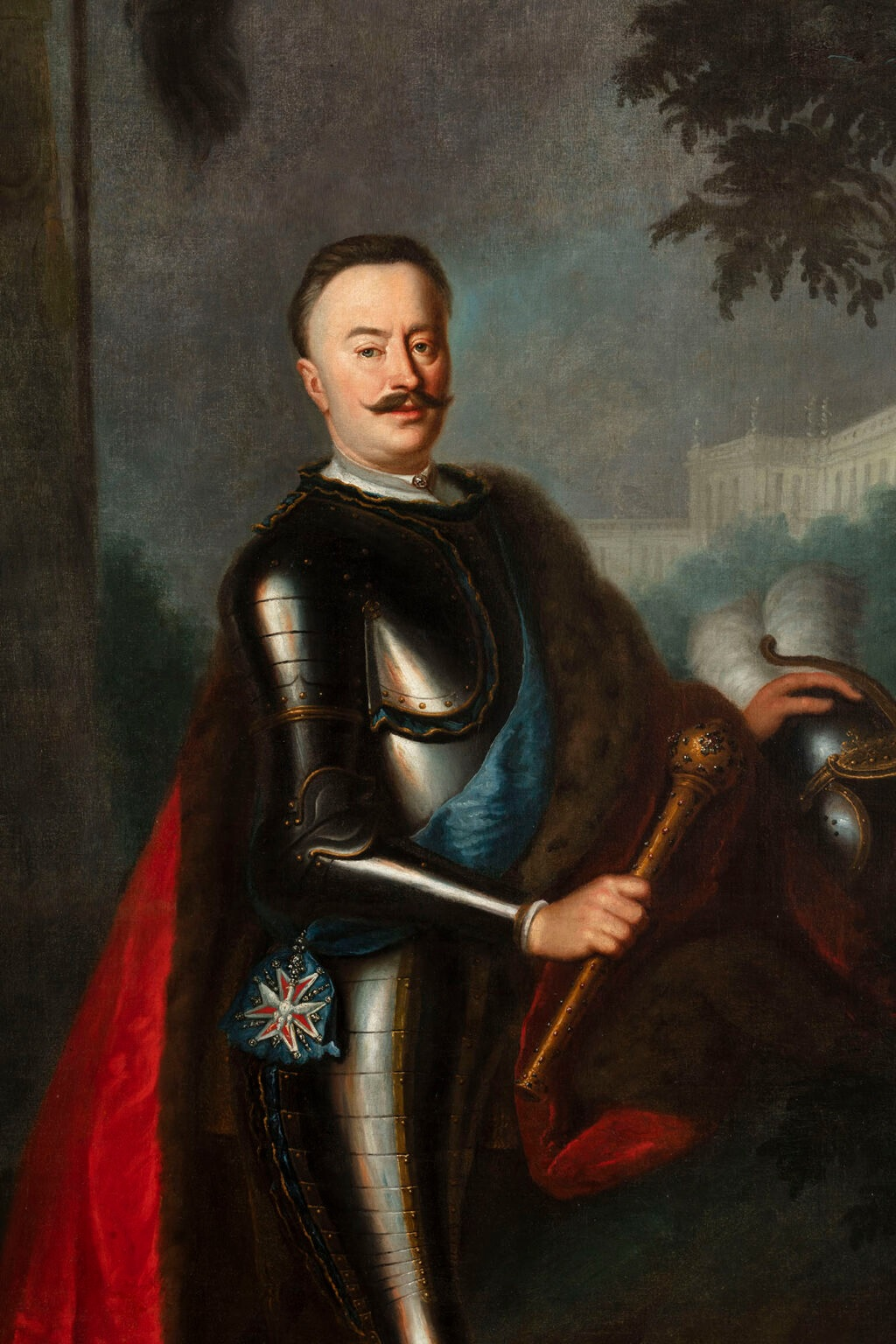
- Born: 21 September 1689; Tykocin or Białystok, Poland
- Died: 9 October 1771 (aged 82); Białystok, Poland
- Noble family: House of Branicki
- Spouses: Katarzyna Barbara Radziwiłł; Barbara Szembek; Izabella Poniatowska
- Father: Stefan Mikołaj Branicki
- Mother: Katarzyna Scholastyka Sapieha
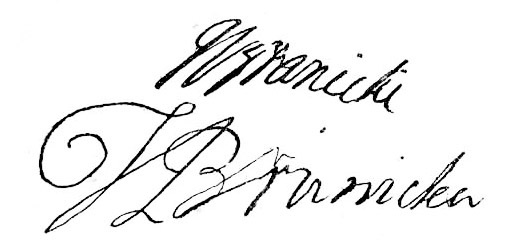
- Signature

Count Jan Klemens Branicki (also known as Jan Kazimierz Branicki; 21 September 1689 – 9 October 1771) was a Polish nobleman, magnate and Hetman, Field Crown Hetman of the Polish–Lithuanian Commonwealth between 1735 and 1752, and Great Crown Hetman between 1752 and 1771. One of the wealthiest Polish magnates in the 18th century, owner of 12 towns, 257 villages and 17 palaces. He was the last male representative of the Branicki family.

He was a recipient of the Spanish Order of the Golden Fleece.

== Biography ==
He was the son of the Palatine of Podlaskie Voivodeship Stefan Mikołaj Branicki and Katarzyna Scholastyka Sapieha, the daughter of Hetman Kazimierz Jan Sapieha. Jan had three wives:

The first wife was Princess Katarzyna Barbara Radziwiłł, the daughter of Prince and Grand Marshal Karol Stanisław Radziwiłł, whom he married on 1 October 1720 in Biała Podlaska.

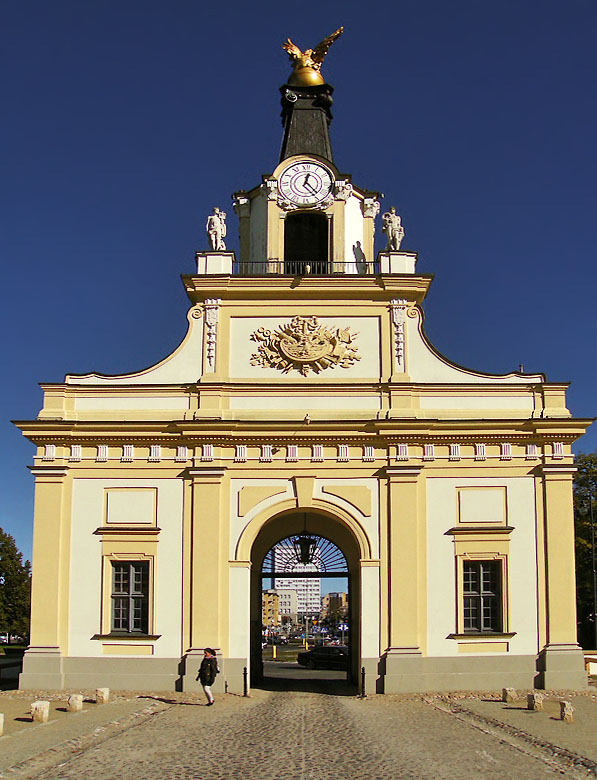
Griffin Gate in Białystok

His second wife was Barbara Szembek in 1732; this marriage ended in a divorce.

His third and last wife was Izabella Poniatowska, the daughter of the magnate Stanisław Poniatowski, whom he married in 1748.

He was Podczaszy of Lithuania (podczaszy litewski) in 1723, Grand Standard-Bearer of the Crown (chorąży wielki koronny) in 1724, commander of an infantry regiment (szef regimentu pieszego) in 1726, Artillery General of the Crown (generał artylerii koronnej) in 1728, hetman polny koronny in 1735, Palatine of Kraków Voivodship (wojewoda krakowski) in 1746, hetman wielki koronny in 1752 and Castellan of Kraków (kasztelan krakowski) in 1762. He was the Starost of Brańsk, Bielsk Podlaski, Mościsk, Janów Lubelski, Bohusław, Złotoryja, Krośno and Jezierzysk (starosta brański, bielski, mościcki, janowski, bohuslawski, złotoryjski, krośnienski, jezierzyski).

Branicki was one of the most powerful and influential magnates in Poland of the 18th century. He was the leader of the magnates party. Connected with the Radziwiłł and Potocki families and an opponent of the "Familia".

He sympathized with confederates of the Radom Confederation and the Confederation of Bar. Branicki was the owner of Białystok. At that time Białystok began to develop. In 1745 he established a military and engineer school and a theatre.

In 1763–1764 he ran in the election for the King of Poland, but was beaten by his brother-in-law Stanisław Poniatowski.

== Marriage and issue ==
He married three times:

1. Princess Katarzyna Barbara Maria Radziwillówna (Biała Podlaska, 6 December 1693 - Białystok, 16 October 1730) in Biała Podlaska, on 1 October 1720
2. Barbara Szembekówna in 1732 and divorced
3. Izabella Poniatowska on 19 November 1748 with no issue.

== Awards ==
- Knight of the Order of the White Eagle, since 1726.
- Order of the Golden Fleece (Spanish Order)

== Bibliography ==
- Władysław Konopczyński: Branicki Jan Klemens. In: Polski Słownik Biograficzny. T. 2: Beyzym Jan – Brownsford Marja. Kraków: Polska Akademia Umiejętności – Skład Główny w Księgarniach Gebethnera i Wolffa, 1936, pp. 404–407. Reprint: Zakład Narodowy im. Ossolińskich, Kraków 1989, ISBN 83-04-03291-0
- Alina Sztachelska-Kokoczka Magnackie dobra Jana Klemensa Branickiego, 2006

== See also ==
- Branicki Palace
- Białystok
