= Stanisław Poniatowski (1676–1762) =

Polish noble, general and diplomat (1676–1762)

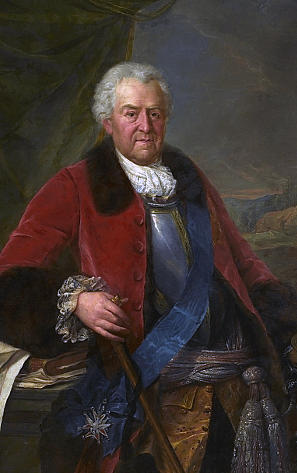
- Portrait by Marcello Bacciarelli, 1758
- Born: 15 September 1676; Chojnik, Poland, Polish–Lithuanian Commonwealth
- Died: 29 August 1762 (aged 85); Ryki, Poland, Polish–Lithuanian Commonwealth
- Noble family: Poniatowski
- Spouses: Teresa Woynianka-Jasieniecka; Konstancja Czartoryska
- Issue: Kazimierz Poniatowski; Jakub Poniatowski; Franciszek Poniatowski; Aleksander Poniatowski; Ludwika Maria Poniatowska; Izabella Poniatowska Stanisław II August, King of Poland Andrzej Poniatowski; Michał Jerzy Poniatowski
- Father: Franciszek Poniatowski
- Mother: Helena Niewiarowska

Stanisław Poniatowski (15 September 1676 – 29 August 1762) was a Polish military commander, diplomat, and noble. Throughout his career, Poniatowski served in various military offices, and was a general in both the Swedish and Polish–Lithuanian militaries. He also held numerous civil positions, including those of podstoli of Lithuania and Grand Treasurer of the Lithuanian army in 1722, voivode of the Masovian Voivodeship in 1731, regimentarz of the Crown Army in 1728, and castellan of Kraków in 1752. Throughout his lifetime, he served in many starost positions.

Poniatowski was involved in Commonwealth politics, and was a prominent member of the Familia, a faction led by the Czartoryski family. On a number of occasions he was in service of Stanisław I Leszczyński, the principal rival of Augustus II for the throne of Poland. Having served under Leszczyński as a military officer and envoy during the Great Northern War, Poniatowski later embraced the Russian-supported Augustus. Subsequently, during the War of the Polish Succession, he returned, with the majority of the Familia, to his earlier allegiance. He later effected a reconciliation with Augustus III, and eventually became one of the new king's chief advisors.

Poniatowski's fifth son, Stanisław August Poniatowski, reigned as the last king of Poland from 1764 until 1795, when he abdicated as a result of the Third Partition of Poland by Russia, Prussia, and Austria. His grandson, Prince Józef Antoni Poniatowski, was a Polish general and later a Marshal of the First French Empire, serving under Napoleon I.

== Biography ==
=== Early life ===
Poniatowski was born on 15 September 1676 in the village of Chojnik, now part of the Lesser Poland Voivodeship. He was the son of Franciszek Poniatowski (1651–1691), "Master of the Hunt" in 1680 and cup-bearer at Wyszogród in 1690, and his wife Helena Niewiarowska, (married 1673/74). He was also the paternal grandson of one Jan Poniatowski, who died before 1676, although rumors regarding his parentage claimed that he was the son of Hetman Jan Kazimierz Sapieha by an unknown Polish Jewish woman, later adopted by Franciszek.

He received elementary education in Kraków, at either the Kraków Academy or at the Nowodworski School. At 13, he was sent to Vienna, capital of the Holy Roman Empire where he spent two years, and afterward traveled to Serbia, then a province of that empire. There, he volunteered to join Imperial forces campaigning against the Ottomans in the Great Turkish War. He served as an adjutant to Michał Franciszek Sapieha, and later commanded a company of cuirassiers. He participated in the Battle of Zenta in 1697.

After the Treaty of Karlowitz of 1699, which ended the war, he returned to Lithuania. Upon his return, he wed Teresa Woynianka-Jasieniecka, but their marriage ended abruptly with her death not long afterward. The union, however, raised his social status. In 1700, he participated in the Lithuanian Civil War as a supporter of the Sapieha family, fighting in the Battle of Valkininkai. Here, he was captured, but managed to escape, and he later served as Sapieha's emissary to Charles XII, king of Sweden.

=== The Great Northern War and subsequent Swedish service ===
In 1702, Swedish forces invaded the Commonwealth as part of the Great Northern War, which had begun in 1700 between the Swedish Empire and the Tsardom of Russia. Augustus II, king of Poland and Elector of Saxony, was an ally of the Russian tsar Peter I. Augustus's forces were defeated, and the king himself was forced back to Saxony. He was replaced by Charles with Stanisław Leszczyński, a Polish nobleman and count of the Holy Roman Empire. Poniatowski, serving as a negotiator between the Wielkopolska Confederation and Charles XII, took the side of Leszczyński and distanced himself from the Sapiehas, formerly his patrons. In 1705, he became the colonel over Leszczyński's newly raised Trabant guard, modeled after the reputable Swedish Drabant Corps.

In 1708, Leszczyński appointed Poniatowski his personal representative to Charles XII. He participated in the Battle of Holowczyn that year, and served as an aide to Charles XII during his exile in the Ottoman Empire after the Battle of Poltava in 1709. Here, he worked to establish an alliance between the Ottomans and the Swedes, aiming to bring the Ottomans into the war against Russia. Due to diplomatic efforts on the part of the French, aligned with Sweden, the Ottomans began to campaign against the Russians in 1710. With this change in Ottoman foreign policy came the dismissal of Çorlulu Ali Pasha, Grand Vizier of Ahmed III. His successor, Köprülü Numan Pasha, was an acquaintance of Poniatowski and had been a supporter of an anti-Russian shift in Ottoman politics.

Poniatowski accompanied the Ottomans during the Pruth River Campaign, but was dissatisfied with the Treaty of the Pruth, which saw the withdrawal of the Ottomans from the war. His attempts to prolong and inflame the conflict failed, resulting in a loss of his status in the Empire and his eventual departure from it in 1713.

Poniatowski did not return to Poland, as Lesczyński had been forced to retreat to Swedish Pomerania upon the return of Augustus in 1709. With the support of Russian forces, Augustus had forced Lesczyński from the throne and had retaken the crown in that year. Instead, Poniatowski entered the service of Sweden, serving as a diplomat for both Charles XII and Lesczyński. He was later involved in mediation attempts between Lesczyński and Augustus, and also joined the Swedish army in various campaigns, being wounded during one in Norway in 1716. During the course of his diplomatic activities, he traveled throughout Europe, including to such countries as Prussia, France, and Spain. For his service to Charles XII, he received the position of the governor of Palatine Zweibrücken, then in personal union with Sweden.

=== Later years: Polish politician and magnate ===
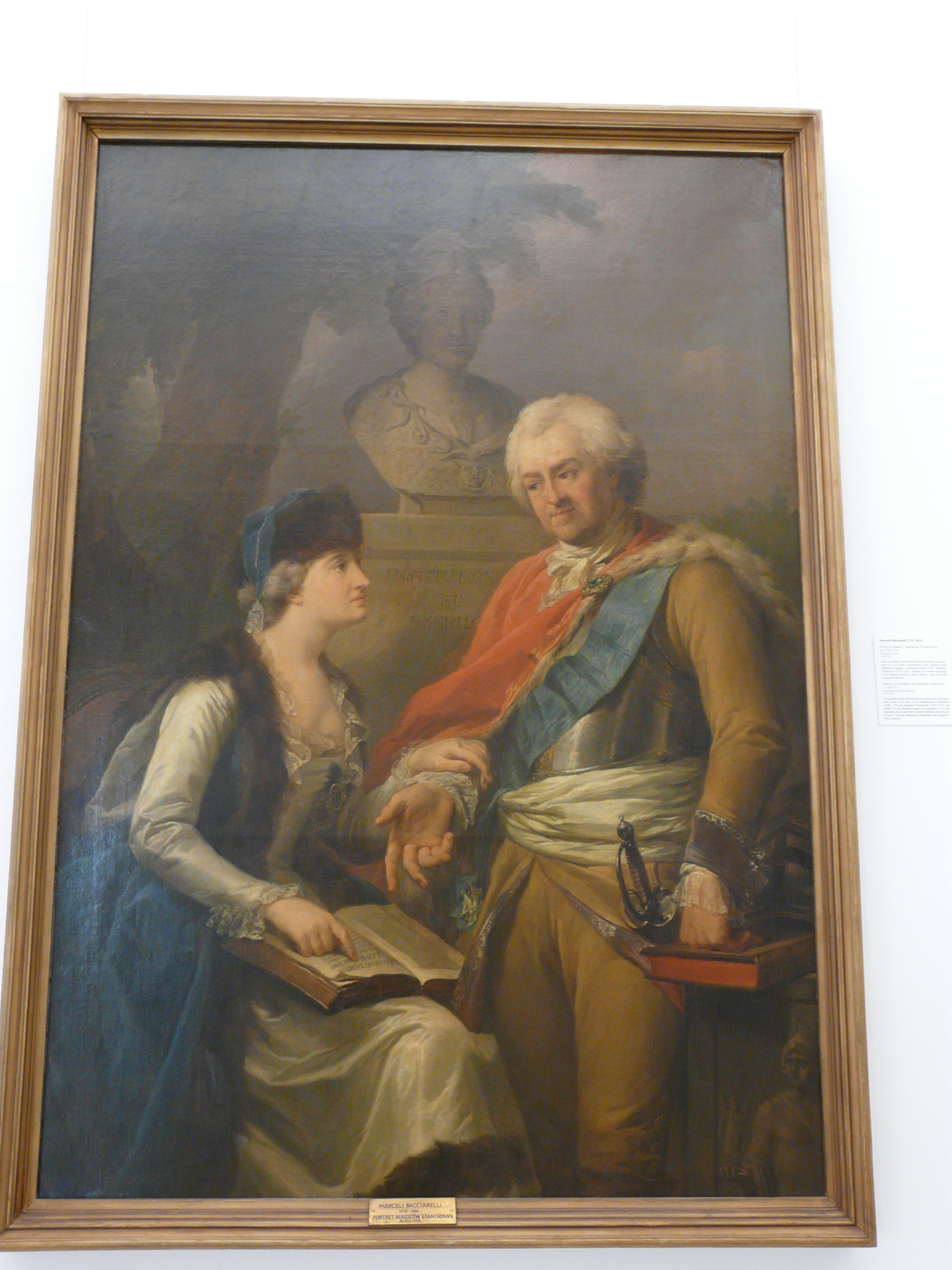
Portrait of Stanisław Poniatowski and Konstancja Czartoryska

Upon Charles's death in 1718, he continued to serve Leszczyński as a diplomat. In 1719 he was briefly imprisoned in Copenhagen, and requested official leave from the Swedish government, which he received that year, thus ending his service as a Swedish diplomat. He returned to the Commonwealth, where he used the title of a general of cavalry. On 14 September 1720 he married Princess Konstancja Czartoryska; this marriage brought him significant wealth. Over the next few years, he became increasingly involved in the creation of the Familia political faction, and most of his ensuing actions had the goal of increasing the Familia's political power.

On 5 December 1722 he received the office of Podstoli of Lithuania (podstoli litewski) in 1722, and 16 December, Grand Treasurer of Lithuanian Army (podskarbi wielki litewski), and became increasingly allied with August II On 20 December 1724 he received the military rank of General of the Lithuanian Army (generał lejtnant wojsk litewskich). In 1726 he became the Knight of the Order of the White Eagle. He was also promised the position of Grand Crown Hetman by August II, receiving in 1728 the rank of a Crown regimentarz. During a period in which no Crown hetmans were appointed, he acted as de facto commander of the Polish–Lithuanian army. He enjoyed support from the military, but his forays into politics gained him significant opposition among the szlachta, led by the Potocki family. He became the voivode of the Masovian Voivodeship in 1731.

After August II's death in 1733, he rekindled his old ties with Leszczyński, but made some attempts to secure his own election to the throne. Eventually, however, he decided to grant Leszczyński his full support, doing so during the convocation sejm of 1733. He again served as Leszczyński's diplomat during the following War of the Polish Succession.

In 1734, he switched sides and joined the supported Augustus III. After several years of distrust, August III started treating Poniatowski as one of his major advisers. Over the next few years, throughout the 1740s, he and familiar supported plans for reform and strengthening the Commonwealth, however most of them have failed due to liberum veto disrupting the Sejm proceedings. Those failures likely resulted in his apathy, and he became much less active on the political scene in the 1750s. On 6 June 1752 he received the office of castellan of Kraków.

Near the end of his life, Poniatowski was among the richest magnates in the Commonwealth, with the value of his estates estimated at about 4 million zlotys. He died in Ryki on 29 August 1762, shortly after suffering a serious fall while walking.

== Family ==
Posthumous portrait by Marcello Bacciarelli, currently held at the Royal Castle in Warsaw, c. 1775–1777

He was the son of Franciszek Poniatowski (1640/1650 – 1691–1695), łowczy podlaski in 1680 and cześnik wyszogrodzki in 1690, and his wife Helena Niewiarowska, who he had married in 1673 or 1674. His older brother Józef Poniatowski (1674 – after 1731) was a generał wojsk koronnych and married Helena Otfinowska, without issue. His younger siblings were Michał Jacenty Poniatowski, a Dominican, and Zofia Agnieszka Poniatowska, a Carmelitan Abbess in Kraków. He married firstly shortly after 1701 and divorced Teresa Woynianka-Jasieniecka, who died after 1710, without issue, and secondly Princess Konstancja Czartoryska on 14 September 1720. They had eight children.

He was the father of:

- Kazimierz Poniatowski (15 September 1721 – 13 April 1800), podkomorzy wielki koronny between 1742 and 1773 and generał wojsk koronnych, who was created a Prince on 4 December 1764 and married on 21 January 1751 Apolonia Ustrzycka (17 January 1736–1814) and had issue
- Franciszek Poniatowski (1723 – 1749/1759), canon and provost in the Cathedral of Kraków (kanonik i proboszcz katedralny krakowski), chancellor of Gniezno in 1748
- Aleksander Poniatowski (1725 – killed in action on 29 June 1744), adiutant of Karl von Lothringen
- Ludwika Maria Poniatowska (30 November 1728 – 10 February 1781), who married in 1745 Jan Jakub Zamoyski (? - 10 February 1790), wojewoda podolski in 1770, IX ordynat till in 1780 and starosta lubelski, and had female issue (Urszula Zamoyska (c. 1750–1808), who married firstly and divorced before 1781 Wincenty Potocki (? - 1825), podkomorzy wielki koronny, and married secondly Michal Jerzy Mniszech, marszalek wielki koronny)
- Izabella Poniatowska, (1 July 1730 – 14 February 1808) was a Polish noblewoman, countess and princess. She was a sister of Stanisław Antoni Poniatowski, who in 1764 became King of Poland and Grand Duke of Lithuania, and reigned as Stanisław II Augustus. She married, firstly on 19 November 1748 as his third wife Hetman Jan Klemens Branicki in 1756, and secondly the Masovian voivode Andrzej Mokronowski, without issue.
- Stanisław II August (Poniatowski), the last King of Poland and Grand-Duke of Lithuania, who was crowned in 1764.
- Andrzej Poniatowski (16 July 1734/5 – Vienna, 3/5 March 1773), Austrian General-Lieutenant in 1760, Austrian Fieldmarshall in 1771 and starost prenski, who was created a Prince on 10 December 1765, and married on 3 May 1761 Maria Teresa, Countess Kinsky von Wchinitz und Tettau (14 February 1740 – 25 September 1806), and had issue
- Michał Jerzy Poniatowski (12 October 1736 – 12 August 1794), opat tyniecki i czerwinski, Bishop of Plock and koadiutor krakowski in 1773 and Archbishop of Gniezno in 1784, who was created a Prince on 4 December 1764
