= Izabela Czartoryska (disambiguation) =

Izabela Czartoryska can refer to three Polish noble ladies of that surname:

- Princess Izabela Elżbieta Czartoryska (née Countess Morsztyn) (1671–1756)
- Princess Izabela Czartoryska (née Countess Fleming) (1746–1835)
- Princess Izabella Elżbieta Czartoryska (1832–1899)
