= Poniatowski (disambiguation) =

Poniatowski (masculine; feminine: Poniatowska; plural: Poniatowscy) is a prominent Polish family. It may also refer to

- Poniatowski (surname)
- Poniatowski Bridge in Warsaw, Poland
- Poniatowski, Wisconsin, an unincorporated community in the United States
