= Konstancja Czartoryska (1700–1759) =

Polish-Lithuanian noblewoman

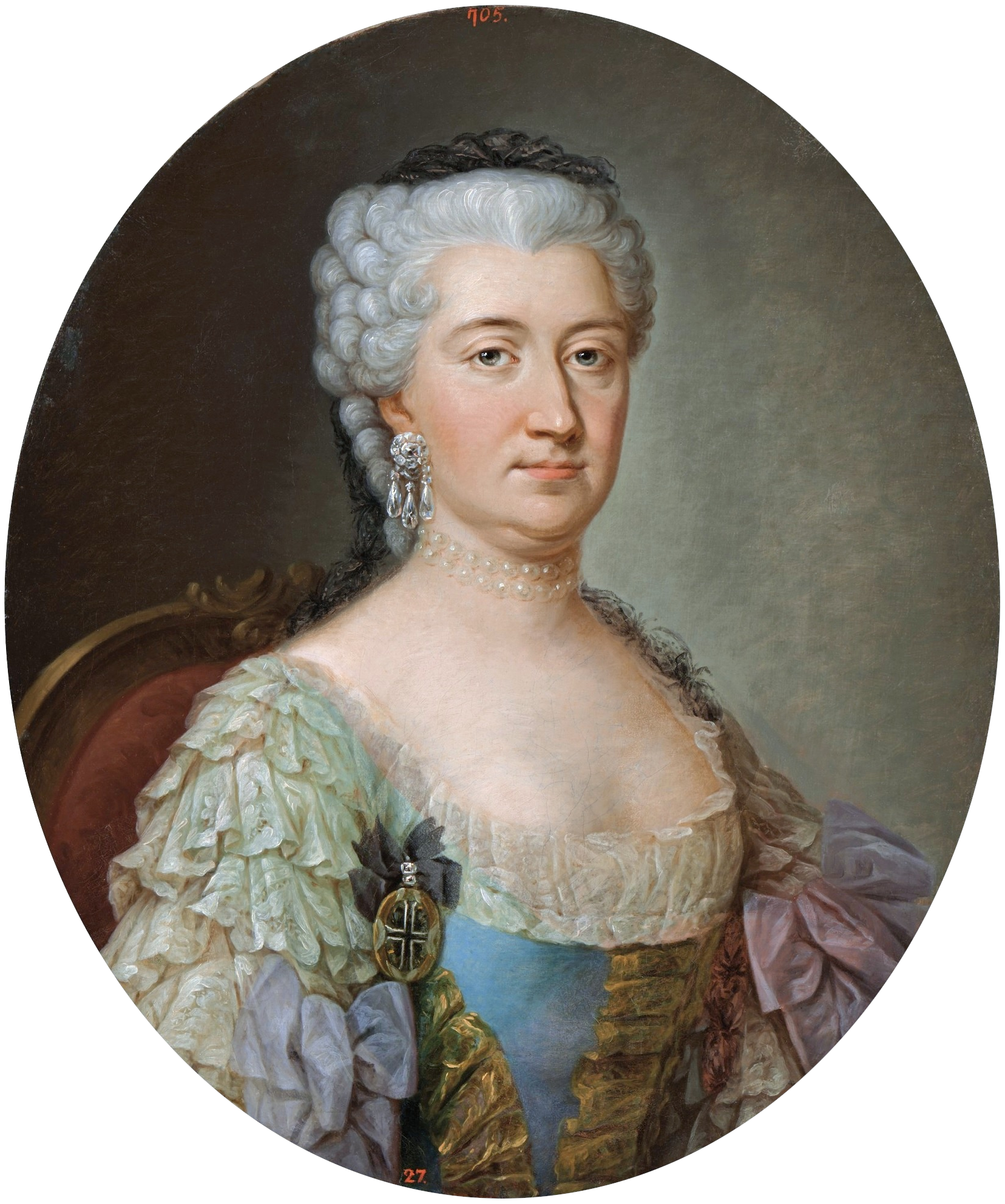
- Portrait by Marcello Bacciarelli
- Full name: Konstancja Zofia Poniatowska née Czartoryska
- Born: 29 January 1696; Warsaw, Poland
- Died: 27 October 1759 (aged 63); Lvivska, Ukraine
- Noble family: Czartoryski
- Spouse: Stanisław Poniatowski
- Issue: Kazimierz Poniatowski; Franciszek Poniatowski; Aleksander Poniatowski; Ludwika Maria Poniatowska; Izabella Poniatowska; Stanisław II August, King of Poland; Andrzej Poniatowski; Michał Jerzy Poniatowski
- Father: Kazimierz Czartoryski
- Mother: Izabela Elżbieta Morsztyn

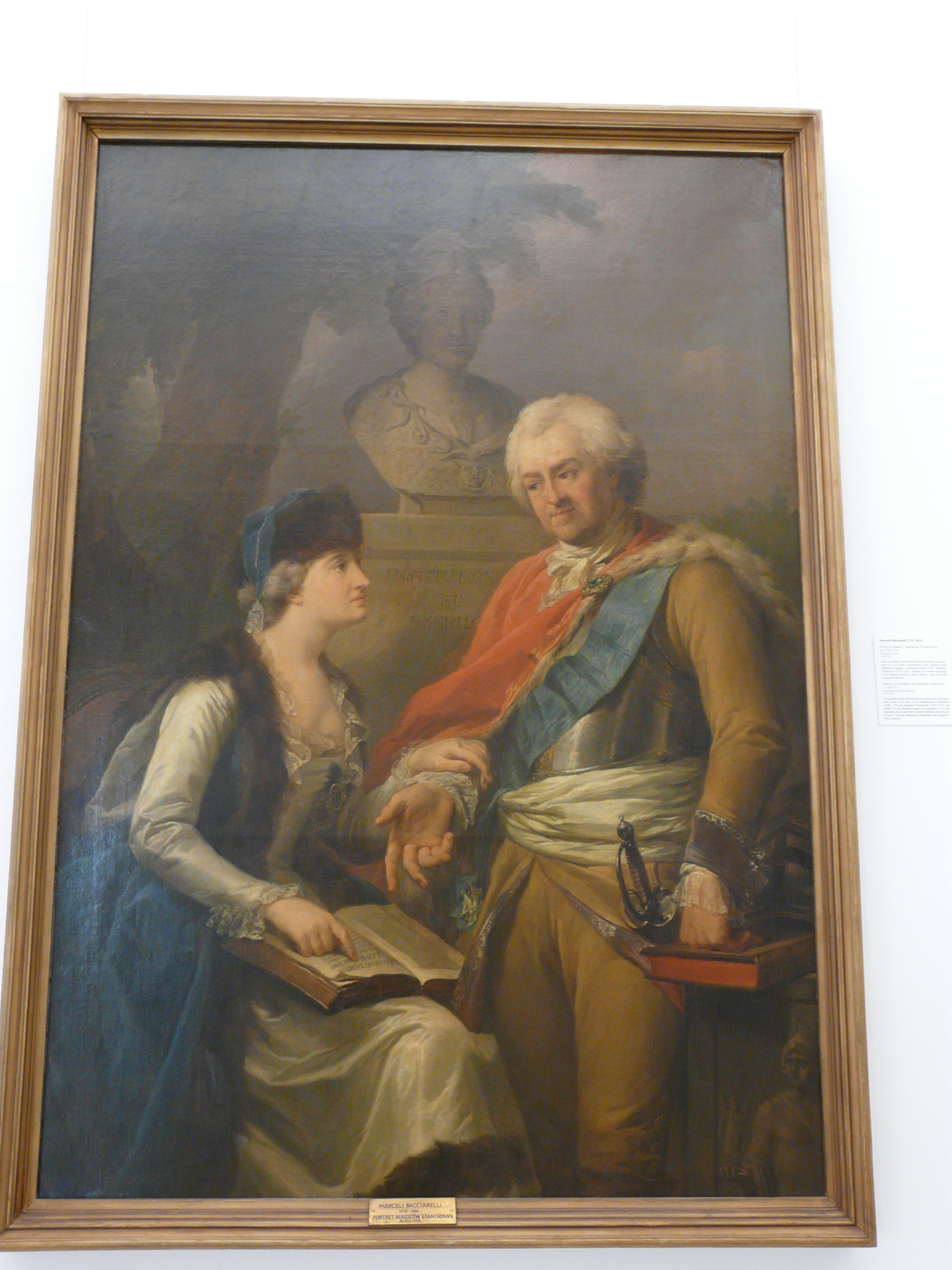
Stanisław and Konstancja Poniatowski

Princess Konstancja Czartoryska (c. 1696 or 29 January 1700 – 27 October 1759) was a Polish-Lithuanian noblewoman and the mother of King Stanisław II August of Poland. She played a political role as a driving force within the Familia (political party).

== Life ==
She was the daughter of magnate Prince Kazimierz Czartoryski and his wife, Izabela Elżbieta Morsztyn. She was given a fashionable French-influenced education. She married Stanisław Poniatowski on 14 September 1720. The marriage was arranged by the assistance of Jakub Henryk Flemming as an alliance between the Poniatowski and Czartoryski family. After marriage, she frequently attended the royal court.

Konstancja Czartoryska became highly influential within the family and was described as a driving force behind the political careers of her spouse and her brothers through her court connections. She reportedly persuaded August Czartoryski to leave Imperial employ. At the interregnum and royal election after the death of King August II in 1733, Konstancja Czartoryska, alongside her mother and Maria Zofia Czartoryska, are described as the most influential people in the Familia Party. The French ambassador initiated negotiations with her regarding the election of Stanisław Leszczyński in connection to Stanisław Poniatowski and Józef Potocki.

In September 1733, she left Warsaw with her family and spent the War of the Polish Succession in Gdańsk. She is described as a serious person with an interest in education and politics and strongly devoted to her mother, and reportedly made sure that her children be given a good education, in contrast to what was often the case in contemporary Poland. In January 1736, she visited Koszalin and successfully persuaded Michał Czartoryski to support August III as king. She returned permanently to Warsaw in 1739.

Konstancja Czartoryska devoted a lot of her time to politics, mainly to secure the alliance between her and her husband's family as a united political party, and she is depicted in the diary of Stanisław August as always attending the family meetings, in which she was a driving force in the party's political policy; often supporting Michał Czartoryski, but rephrasing his emotional outbursts and discussing the issues in a more constructive tone with August Czartoryski. In 1743, she was involved in a scandal when her son Kazimierz was challenged to a duel by Adam Tarła after having danced with Tarla's wife. After her son escaped the first duel unharmed, she allegedly told her son that she would rather see him dead than covered in shame. This led to the second duel, in which Tarla was killed in a duel at Marymont. In 1745, she resolved the conflict between Jerzy Ignacy Lubomirski and Czerniak Stanisławs and Antoni Lubomirski. In 1752, the wife of the French ambassador, Countess de Broglie, accused her of being behind the poisoning of L.A Duperron de Castér and described her as a person capable of anything. In 1753, she called her son back from France and supported him being sent to Russia in cooperation with Ch. H. Williams.

In 1755, she lost her political influence within the family political party because of her opposition to a Polish participation in the Seven Years' War and discord with her brothers, who no longer respected her opinions. The death of her mother caused her to fall in to depression and a greater interest in religion.

== In culture ==
She was portrayed in a novel by Maria Dernałowicz, "Portret Familia" (W. 1974).

== Children ==
- Kazimierz Poniatowski - podkomorzy of the Crown
- Stanisław August Poniatowski - last king of Poland
- Andrzej Poniatowski - Austrian field marshal
- Michał Jerzy Poniatowski - last primate of Poland (in the First Republic of Poland)
- Izabella Poniatowska - wife of Jan Klemens Branicki, and later of Andrzej Mokronowski
