= Izabela Elżbieta Czartoryska =

Izabela Elżbieta Czartoryska can refer to two Polish noble ladies of that surname:

- Princess Izabela Elżbieta Czartoryska (née Countess Morsztyn) (1671–1756)
- Princess Izabella Elżbieta Czartoryska (1832–1899)
