= Jan Andrzej Morsztyn =

Polish poet (1621–1693)

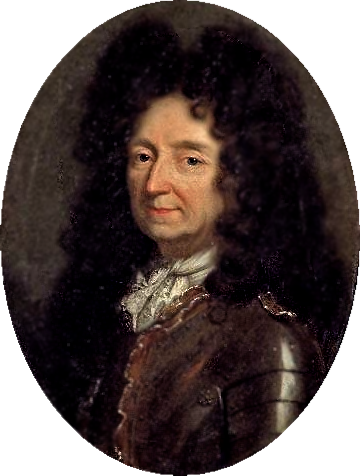
Portrait, after 1690

Jan Andrzej Morsztyn (1621–1693) was a Polish poet, member of the landed nobility, and official in the Polish–Lithuanian Commonwealth. He was starosta of Zawichost, Tymbark and Kowal. He was also pantler of Sandomierz (1647–58), Royal Secretary (from 1656), a secular referendary (1658–68), and Deputy Crown Treasurer from 1668. Apart from his career at the Polish court, Morsztyn is famous as a leading poet of the Polish Baroque and a prominent representative of Marinist style in Polish literature. Over his lifetime he accumulated considerable wealth. In 1683 he was accused of treason and was forced to emigrate to France.

== Life ==
Morsztyn was born 24 July 1621 at Wiśnicz, near Kraków, into a wealthy Calvinist family of coat-of-arms Leliwa. He studied at Leiden University and, with his brother, traveled extensively in Italy and France. After returning to Poland, he became a retainer of the magnate Lubomirski family, and through them became attached to the royal court. He was a deputy to the Sejms of 1648, 1650, 1653, 1658 and 1659. He served on numerous Sejm commissions for diplomatic, legal and fiscal matters. He took part in diplomatic missions to Hungary (1653), Sweden (1655) and Austria (1656).

He was named Royal Secretary in 1656, Crown Referendary in 1658, and Deputy Crown Treasurer in 1668. During those years he took part in many diplomatic missions and negotiations; he was part of the mission that negotiated the Treaty of Oliwa (1660). He fought in The Deluge and in the Chmielnicki Uprising.

In politics he represented the pro-French faction, promoting the French candidate in the royal election of 1668, and become a vocal supporter of French policies in the Commonwealth. He accepted French pension and citizenship. When king John III Sobieski distanced himself from France, and allied with Austria, he was accused of treason and emigrated to France in 1683, where he assumed the title of comte de Châteauvillain and spent the last years of his life as a royal secretary. The Sejm of 1686 stripped him of all offices and titles and banned him from the country.

Jan Morsztyn died 8 January 1693 in Paris.

== Family ==
In 1659 he married Scottish noblewoman Lady Catherine Gordon of Huntly (1635–1691), the youngest daughter of George Gordon, 2nd Marquess of Huntly (1589–1649) and Lady Anne Campbell, eldest daughter of the seventh Earl of Argyll. She went to Poland with her older brother Scots-born colonel Lord Henry Gordon of Huntly, who served the king of Poland for several years. Lord Gordon returned to Scotland, and died at Strathbogie. Catherine was a lady-in-waiting at the Court of Queen Marie Louise de Gonzaga. They had a son and three daughters, who all married members of high European aristocracy, except one daughter who became a nun.

They became Prince Kazimierz Czartoryski's parents-in-law, by their younger daughter Isabella Morsztynowna. Through the Czartoryski family, they are :

- great-grandparents of Stanisław II Augustus, the King of Poland (1732–1796). The king's mother, Princess Konstancja Czartoryska, is Prince Kazimierz Czartoryski's daughter.
- ancestors of Mathilde d'Udekem d'Acoz, Queen (Consort) of the Belgians.
  - explanation : Prince Kazimierz Czartoryski's great-granddaughter Zofia Czartoryska and her husband Stanisław Kostka Zamoyski are Prince Leon Sapieha-Kodenski's parents-in-law. Prince Leon's great-great-granddaughter, Princess Zofia Sapieha-Kodenska, is Queen Mathilde's maternal grandmother, who died in a car accident with the princess's sister, Marie-Alix d'Udekem d'Acoz. Jan Andrzej Morsztyn and Catherine Gordon of Huntly are 11th-generation ancestors to Queen Mathilde.

== Works ==
Jan Andrzej Morsztyn was one of the leading poets of the Polish Baroque. His language was marked by the extravagant style of 16th-century Italian Marinism. He had written most of his works before becoming Deputy Crown Treasurer in 1668. Morsztyn, a courtier and political intriguer, considered his writing a hobby and let most of his works circulate in manuscript, afraid that wider publication could prove damaging to his career. Thus most of his works first appeared in print only in the 19th century.

A master of poetic form, he wrote the collections of verses Kanikuła (Dog Days, 1647) and Lutnia (Lute, 1661). He was concerned less with the "worldly happiness" but rather, with its inherent self-contradictions, such as paradoxes of love, full both of frivolity and metaphysical fear. Nonetheless some of his other works had political subtones, like Pospolite ruszenie or Pieśń w obozie pod Żwańcem (Song in the camp near Żwaniec), which criticized szlachta unwillingness to react to potential dangers (from Tatars or Cossacks). Unlike his cousin, Zbigniew Morsztyn, few of his works can be counted as religious poetry, the notable exception being the Pokuta w kwartanie.

He was also a known translator (of Torquato Tasso, Giambattista Marino and Pierre Corneille). His translation of Corneiile's Le Cid was the first translation of this work into Polish and has remained the standard Polish version even today.

In 1660 he coauthored a proposal for the reform of the Sejm.

== See also ==
- List of Poles
