= Kazimierz Czartoryski =

Polish nobleman (1674–1741)

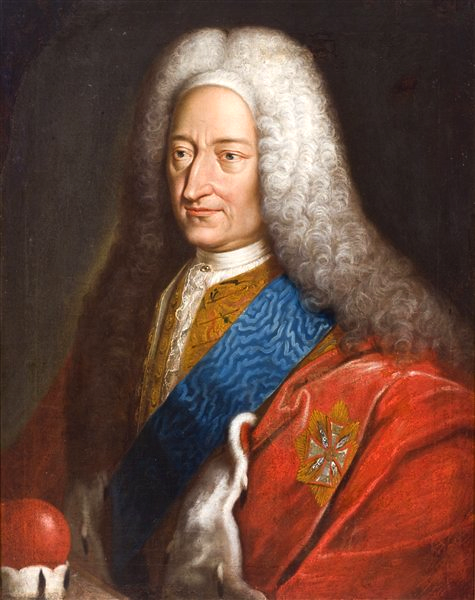
- Born: 4 March 1674; Warsaw, Poland
- Died: 31 August 1741 (aged 67); Warsaw, Poland
- Noble family: Czartoryski
- Spouse: Izabela Elżbieta Morsztyn
- Issue: with Izabela Elżbieta Morsztyn; Michał Fryderyk Czartoryski; August Aleksander Czartoryski; Konstancja Czartoryska; Teodor Kazimierz Czartoryski; Ludwika Elżbieta Czartoryska
- Father: Michal Jerzy Czartoryski
- Mother: Joanna Weronika Olędzka

Prince Kazimierz Czartoryski (4 March 1674 – 31 August 1741) was a Polish–Lithuanian nobleman, Duke of Klewań and Żuków.

Kazimierz became Deputy cup-bearer of Lithuania in 1699, Grand Treasurer of Lithuania in 1707–1709, nominated by King Stanisław Leszczyński. He was also Deputy Chancellor of Lithuania in 1712–1724. Castellan of Vilnius since 1724 and starost of Krzemieniec, Wieliż and Uświaty.

He founded the "Familia" during the interregnum in 1696–1699. He supported the candidature of François Louis, Prince of Conti for the Polish throne in 1697.

== Family ==
In 1693 he married Izabela Morsztyn, daughter of Jan Andrzej Morsztyn and Katarzyna Gordon. They had three sons and two daughters.

- Michał Fryderyk (1696-1775), Duke of Klewań and Żuków
- August Aleksander (1697-1782), father of Adam Kazimierz Czartoryski
- Konstancja (1700-1759), mother of King Stanisława Augusta Poniatowskiego
- Ludwika Elżbieta (1703-1745)
- Teodor Kazimierz (1704-1768), bishop of Poznań
