= Eleonora Czartoryska =

Polish princess (1710–1795)

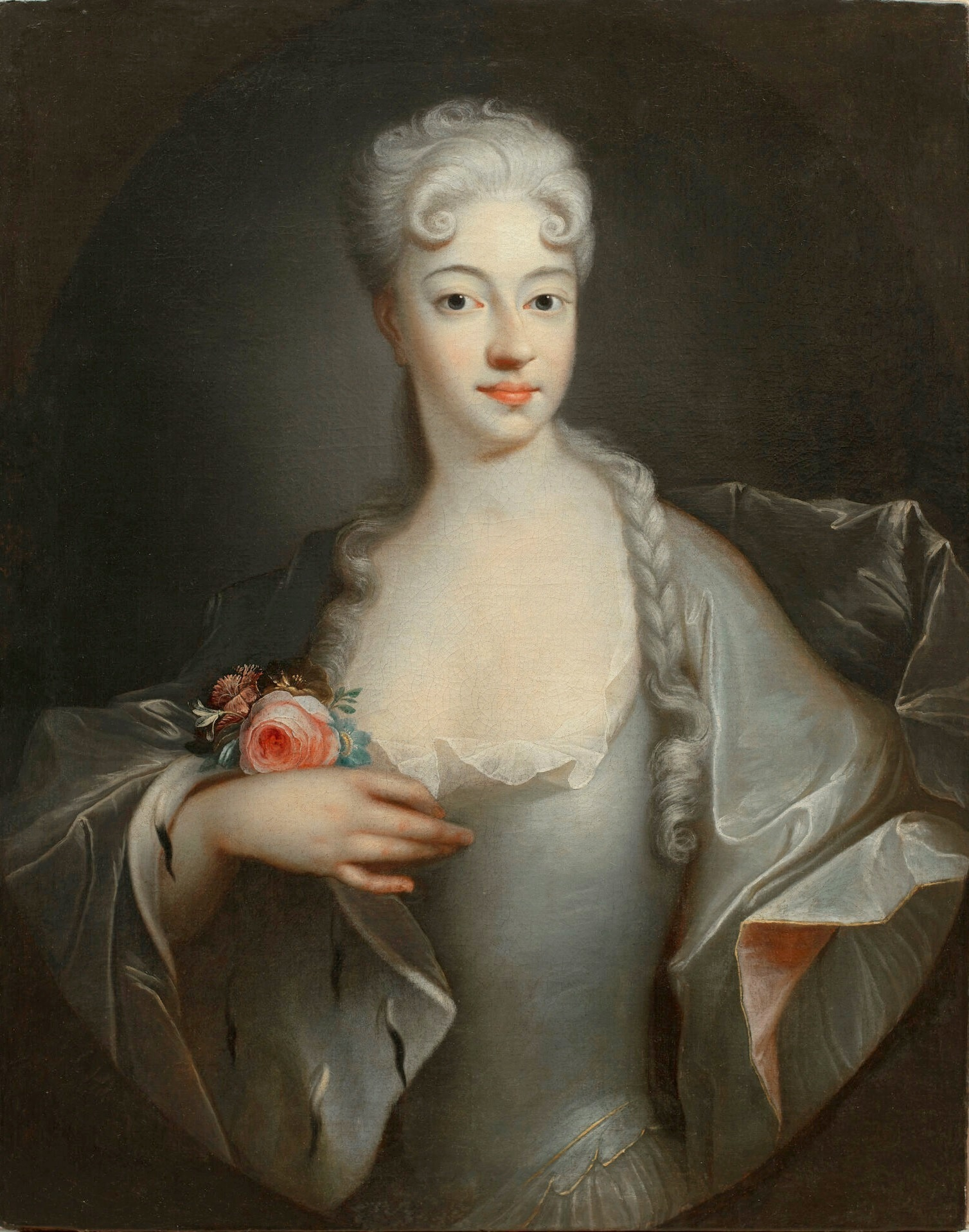
Portrait by Ádám Mányoki, c. 1730

Eleonora Czartoryska (1710–1795) was a Polish princess, born Countess von Waldstein-Wartenberg. She was the ruler of the city of Radzymin from 1770 to 1790, where she built a palace and a park, commissioned a church designed by Jan Chrystian Kamsetzer and wrote a unique collection of laws on the city's governmental principles. She was married to Michał Fryderyk Czartoryski who became the Grand Chancellor of Lithuania.

== Sources ==
- Jan Wnuk "Księżna Eleonora Czartoryska - dziedziczka Radzymina" wyd. 2008
