= Michał Jerzy Poniatowski =

Polish nobleman and bishop (1736–1794)

His Excellency Michał Jerzy Poniatowski
- Archbishop of Gniezno; Primate of Poland
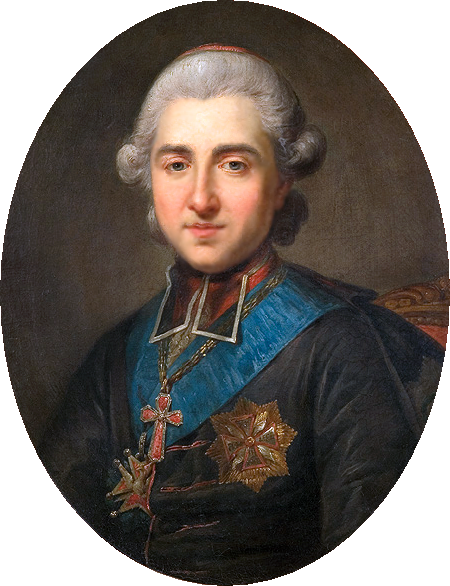
- portrait by Marcello Bacciarelli (National Museum in Poznań) - a studio copy of the same work is in the Royal Castle, Warsaw
- Born: 12 October 1736; Gdańsk, Poland
- Died: 12 August 1794 (aged 57); Warsaw, Poland
- Noble family: Poniatowski
- Father: Stanisław Poniatowski
- Mother: Konstancja Czartoryska

Prince Michał Jerzy Poniatowski (12 October 1736 – 12 August 1794) was a Polish nobleman.

Abbot of Tyniec and Czerwińsk (opat tyniecki i czerwinski), Bishop of Płock and Coadjutor Bishop of Kraków (koadiutor krakowski) from 1773, and Archbishop of Gniezno and Primate of Poland from 1784.

He was made a knight of the Order of the White Eagle on 25 November 1764. Nine days later, on 4 December, he was made a prince by his brother, the last king of Poland, Stanisław August Poniatowski.

He was made a royal member of the Royal Society in 1791.

== Sources ==
- Angela Sołtys, Opat z San Michele. Grand Tour prymasa Poniatowskiego i jego kolekcje, Warszawa 2008
- Zofia Zielińska, Poniatowski Michał Jerzy, "Polski Słownik Biograficzny", XXVII, Wrocław 1983.

Catholic Church titles
Preceded by Hieronim Antoni Szeptycki	Bishop of Płock; 1773–1784	Succeeded by Krzysztof Hilary Szembek
Preceded by Antoni Kazimierz Ostrowski	Archbishop of Gniezno; Primate of Poland; 1785–1794	Succeeded by Ignacy Krasicki
