= Morstein =

Morstein is a given name and surname. Notable people with the name include:

- Fritz Morstein Marx (1900–1969), German-American political and administrative scientist
- Judy Morstein (1943–2017), American politician, governor of Montana and Olympian speed skater

== See also ==
- de:Schloss Morstein
