= Andrzej Poniatowski =

Polish noble (1730s–1773)

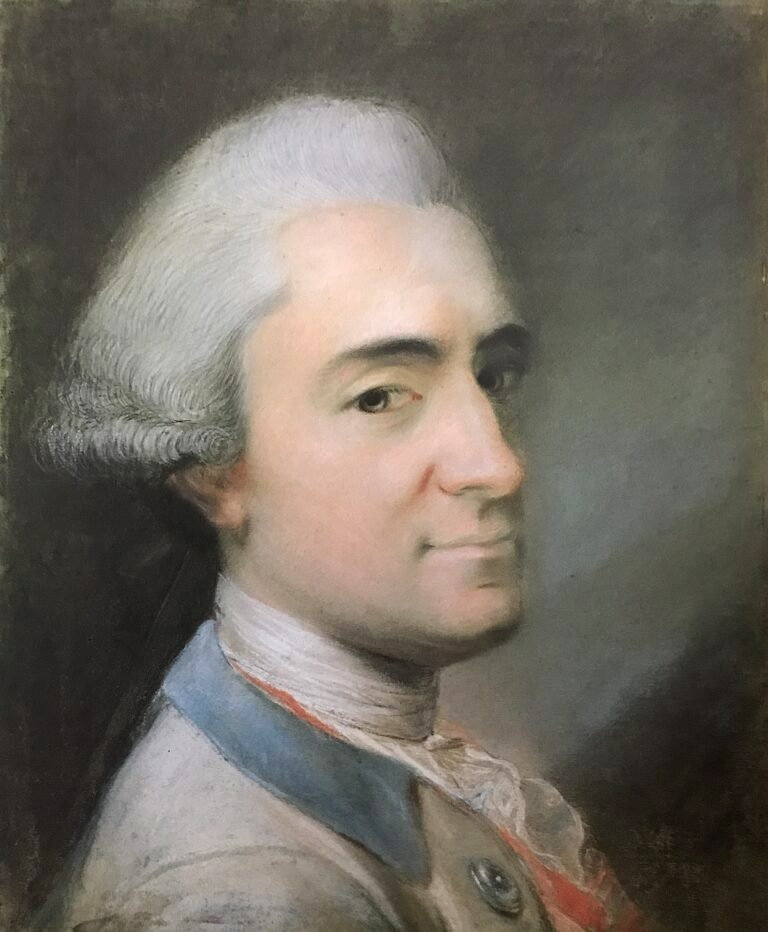
- Born: 16 July 1735 unknown
- Died: 3 March 1773 (aged 37); Vienna, Austria
- Noble family: Poniatowski
- Spouse: Maria Teresa Kinsky von Weichnitz und Tettau
- Issue: Maria Teresa Poniatowska; Józef Antoni Poniatowski
- Father: Stanisław Poniatowski
- Mother: Konstancja Czartoryska

Prince Andrzej Poniatowski (16 July 1734/5 – Vienna, 3 March 1773) was a Polish nobleman (Szlachcic), General and Field Marshal, member of the House of Poniatowski.

== Biography ==
Andrzej was a son of Count Stanisław Poniatowski, Castellan of Kraków, and Princess Konstancja Czartoryska, the brother of King Stanisław August Poniatowski of Poland and the father of Józef Antoni Poniatowski.

He became Starost of Pieńsk (starost prenski), Lieutenant-General in 1760 and Field Marshal in 1771 (both in Austrian service) and disguised himself during the Seven Years' War. In 1764 he came back to Poland and supported his brother in the royal elections in Poland. The Coronation Sejm awarded him the Polish title of Prince on 4 December 1764, Empress Maria Theresa on 10 December 1765 the Bohemian title of Prince, and Emperor Joseph II the Austrian title of Prince. He was also starost prenski.

He married on 3 May 1761 Countess Maria Theresia Kinsky von Wchinitz und Tettau (14 February 1736/1740 - 25 September 1806), daughter of Count Leopold-Ferdinand Kinsky von Wchinitz und Tettau (Chlumec nad Cidlinou (Chlumetz), 17 January 1713 – 24 October 1760) and his wife (married in Vienna, 6 September 1734), Maria Teresa Capece dei Marchesi di Rofrano (3 June 1715 – 12 November 1778) by whom he had a daughter, Maria Teresa (baptized on 28 November 1760 – Tours, 2 November 1834), married in 1778 Count Wincenty Tyszkiewicz (? - 1816), referendarz wielki litewski, and a son, Józef Antoni Poniatowski. He died on 3 March 1773 of tuberculosis at the age of 38.

== Awards ==
- Holy Roman Empire: Knight of the Military Order of Maria Theresa, 7 March 1758
- Polish-Lithuanian Commonwealth:
  - Knight of the Order of St. Stanislaus, 1765
  - Knight of the Order of the White Eagle, 1766
- Kingdom of France: Knight of the Order of St. Michael

== Bibliography ==
- Emanuel Rostworowski, „Poniatowski Andrzej”, w: Polski Słownik Biograficzny, XXVII, Wrocław 1983, s. 412–420.
- Henryk P. Kosk, Polscy generałowie w służbie obcej, Polska Zbrojna.
- Historia Dyplomacji Polskiej – tom II 1572–1795, PWN Warszawa 1981, s. 548.
