= Izabella Poniatowska =

Polish noblewoman (1730–1808)

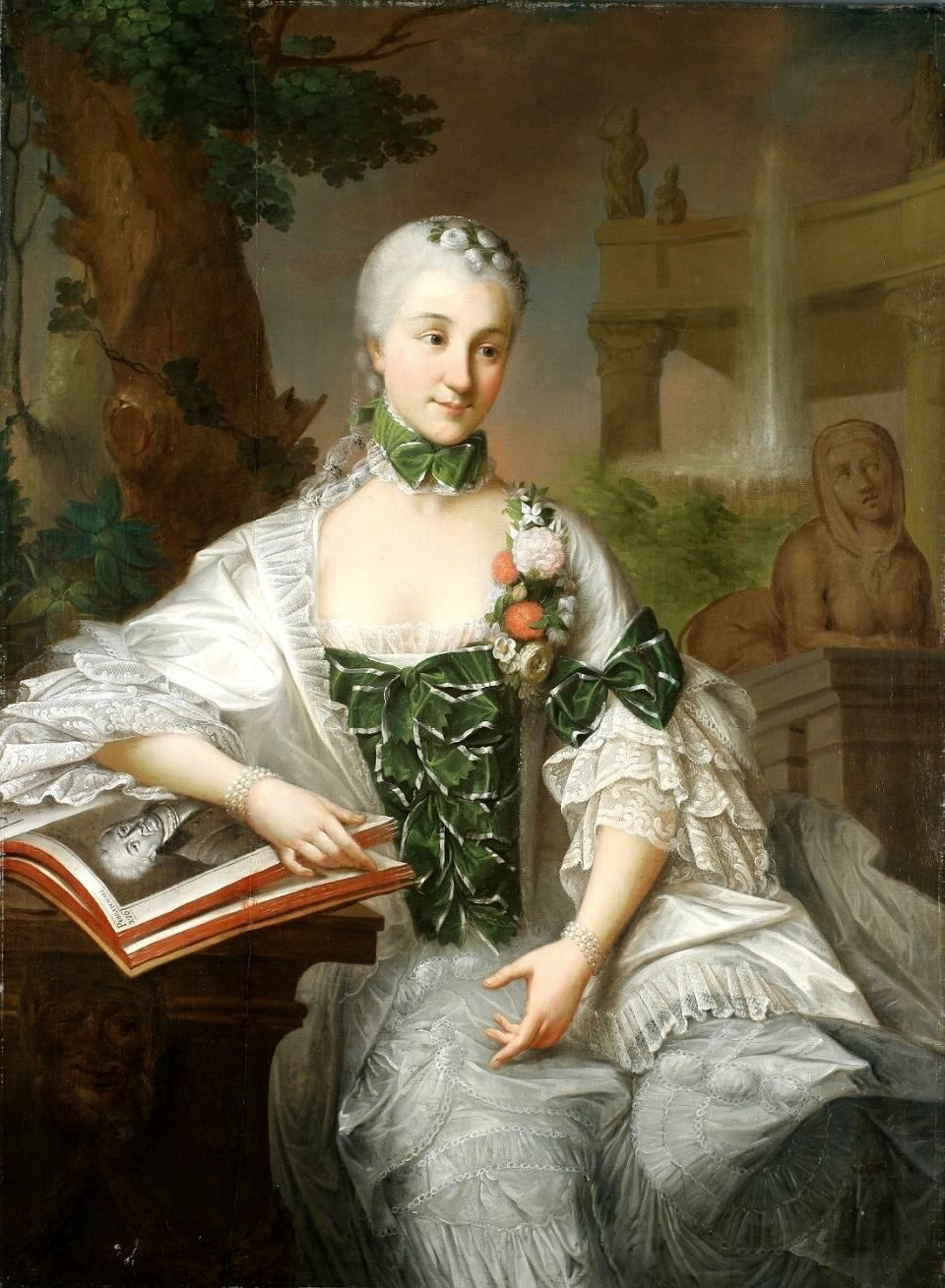
- Portrait by Marcello Bacciarelli
- Born: 1 July 1730; Wołczyn, Polish–Lithuanian Commonwealth
- Died: 14 February 1808 (aged 77); Białystok, Russian Empire
- Noble family: Poniatowski
- Spouses: Jan Klemens Branicki; Andrzej Mokronowski
- Issue: none
- Father: Stanisław Poniatowski
- Mother: Konstancja Czartoryska

Countess Izabella Poniatowska (1 July 1730 – 14 February 1808) was a Polish noblewoman, sister of king Stanisław August Poniatowski.

== Life ==
She was the daughter of Stanisław Poniatowski and Konstancja Czartoryska. She was reportedly close to her brother Stanisław during their childhood.

On 19 November 1748 she married Hetman Jan Klemens Branicki. The marriage was arranged to give the Czartoryska-Poniatowski family political party an ally in her spouse, and she was expected by her family to influence him. However, her spouse was indifferent to her, and she left him to live with the Masovian voivode Andrzej Mokronowski, whom she eventually married. This was a time of difficulty for her, as she was exposed to conflict with her family and her elopement was treated a scandal.

=== Sister of the King ===
In 1763, her brother was elected king of Poland.

She was described as her brother's close confidante and friend, and her relationship with him is described as sentimental and tender, but she was said to lack any understanding of - or interest - in political issues. In 1769, she advised the king to ally with France in order to be given a secure future with an allowance if he should be deposed by the Bar Confederation. Her brother the king granted her Moscow, Bielsko and Krosno as starosti for her personal income. She lived a life in comfort and had a private Italian orchestra, theater and ballet, and spent the winters in Warsaw and the summers in Bialystok. She was called pretty but not intelligent, and her receptions was visited by foreign travelers and diplomats. In Bialystok, she introduced several social inventions such as schools and hospitals.

She was included in the circle of advisers of her brother, and supported the career of Joachim Chreptowicz. She and her sister Ludwika Maria Poniatowska both opposed her brother's suggested marriage to princess Sophia Albertina of Sweden. In 1783, she visited France with her husband. In 1784, she was widowed a second time.

She stayed with her brother the King in Warsaw all through the Kościuszko Uprising to support him, despite being afraid, and the first shots during the revolution is said to have been fired near her palace. She supported Stanisław Mokronowski during the uprising, but advised her brother not to endanger his safety. She followed her brother on his exile to Grodno.
