= Mikołaj Jerzy Czartoryski =

Polish–Lithuanian Commonwealth noble and politician

Mikołaj Jerzy Czartoryski (1585–1662) of Czartoryski coat of arms was a Polish–Lithuanian Commonwealth noble and politician, born in Klevan. Member of the Czartoryski family. Castellan of Wołyń (Volhyia) from 1633. Voivode of Podolia (1655), voivode of Wołyń (1657).

His marriage to Izabella Korecka was a significant boost to the wealth of his family.

== Ancestry ==
Ancestors of Mikołaj Jerzy Czartoryski

8. Prince Feodor Mikhailovich Czartoryski
4. Prince Ivan Feodorovich Czartoryski
9. Princess Zofia Sanguszko
2. Prince Jerzy Czartoryski
10. Prince Kuzma Zaslawsky
5. Princess Anna Eudoxia Zaslawska
11. Princess Nastazia Holshanska
1. Prince Mikołaj Jerzy Czartoryski
12. Prince Ivan Mikhailovich Wiśniowiecki
6. Prince Andrei Ivanovich Wisniowiecki
13. Maria Magdalena Brankovićh
3. Princess Aleksandra Anna Wisniowiecka
14. Jerzy Jan Wierzbicki
7. Euphemia Wierzbicka
