= Jan Jakub Zamoyski =

Polish nobleman

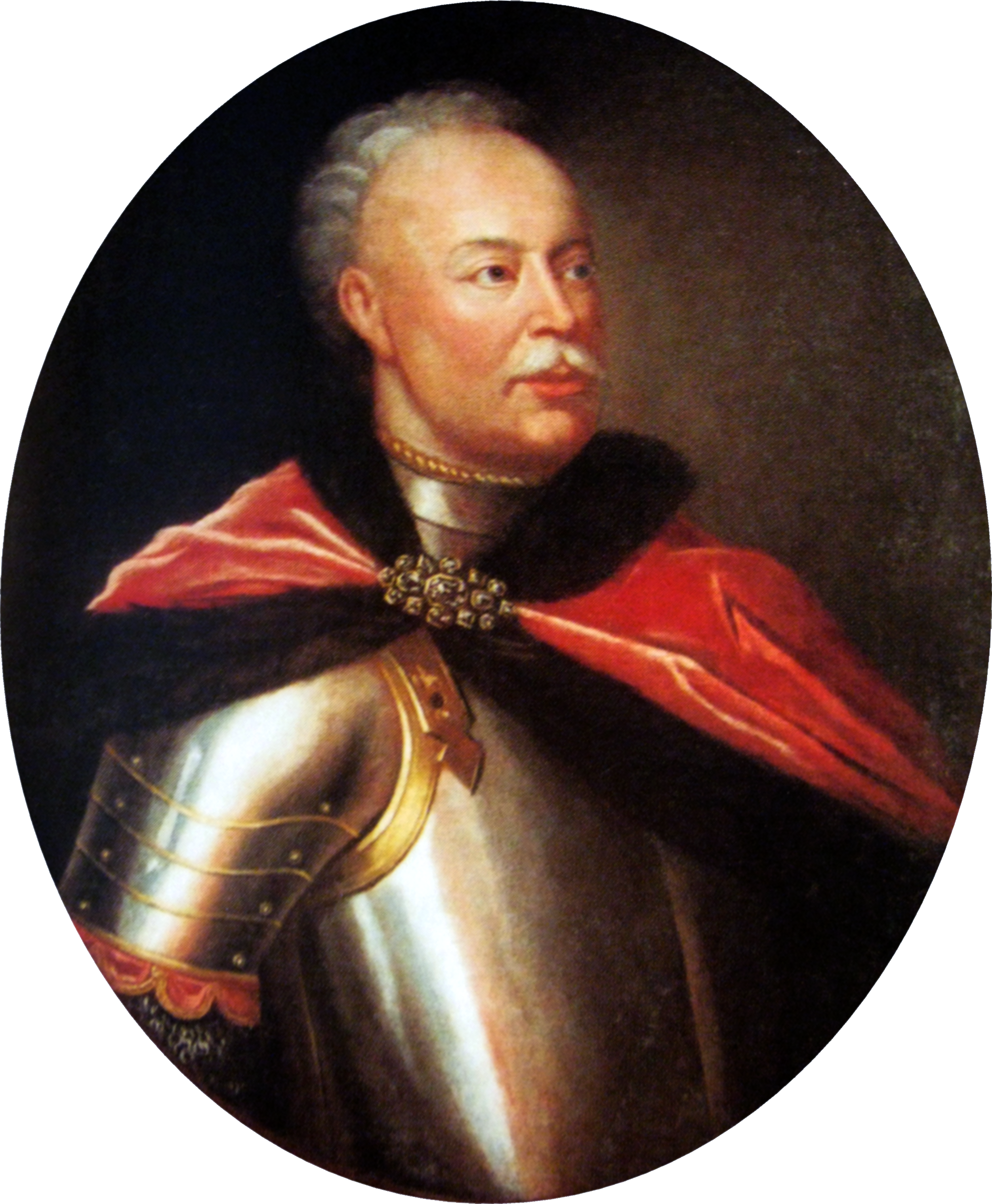
- Born: 2 July 1716; Bieżuń, Poland
- Died: 10 February 1790 (aged 73); Łabunie, Poland
- Noble family: Zamoyski
- Spouse: Ludwika Maria Poniatowska
- Issue: Urszula Zamoyska
- Father: Michał Zdzisław Zamoyski
- Mother: Anna Działyńska

Jan Jakub Graf Zamoyski (22 July 1716 – 10 February 1790) was a Polish nobleman (szlachcic). He was the brother-in-law of king Stanisław August Poniatowski.

Jan became the 9th Ordynat (IX ordynat) of Zamość estate in or until 1780. He was voivode of Podole Voivodeship (wojewoda podolski) in 1770 and starost of Lublin (starosta lubelski). He was awarded the Knight of the Order of the White Eagle on 8 May 1768.

Jan married in 1745 Ludwika Maria Poniatowska, by whom she had one child, the daughter Urszula Zamoyska (c. or bef. 1750–1808).
