= Ludwika Maria Poniatowska =

Polish noblewoman (1728–1804)

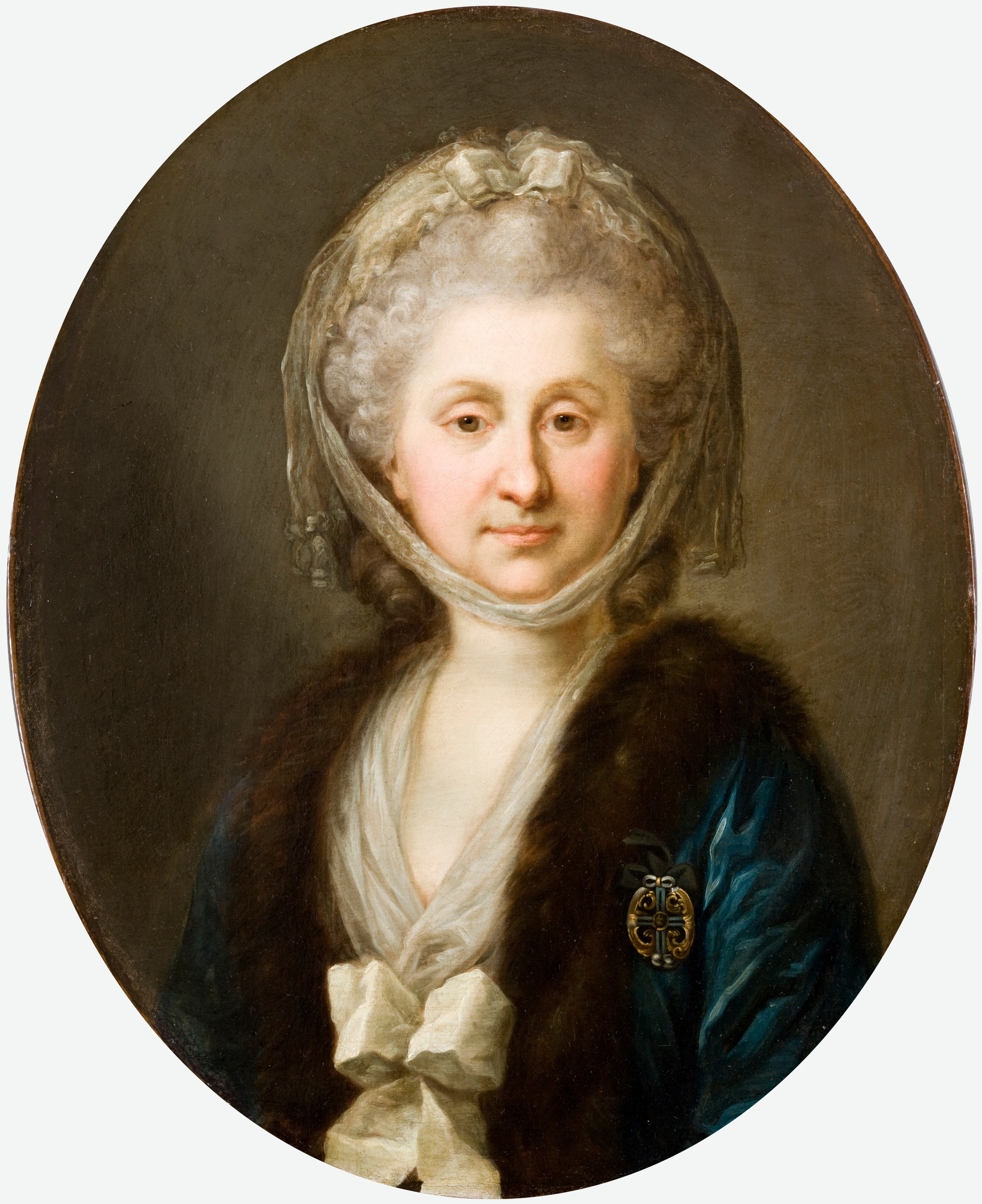
- Born: 30 November 1728; Warsaw, Poland
- Died: 2 October 1804 (aged 75); Vienna, Austria
- Noble family: Poniatowski
- Spouse: Jan Jakub Zamoyski
- Issue: Urszula Zamoyska
- Father: Stanisław Poniatowski
- Mother: Konstancja Czartoryska

Countess Ludwika "Luds" Maria Poniatowska (30 November 1728 – 2 October 1804) was a Polish noblewoman. She was the sister of the King of Poland, Stanisław August Poniatowski.

== Life ==
She was the daughter of Stanisław Poniatowski and Konstancja Czartoryska.

In 1745, she married Jan Jakub Graf Zamoyski, by whom she only had a daughter. The couple separated after the birth of their daughter in 1750.

In 1763, her brother was elected king of Poland. She and her sister Izabella Poniatowska both opposed her brother's suggested marriage to princess Sophia Albertina of Sweden.

In the spring of 1791, she and her daughter visited Paris during a difficult period in Poland, which attracted bad publicity.

On 7 January 1795, she, her daughter and family joined king Stanisław in Grodno, and remained by his side during the Third Partition of Poland. Reportedly, she and her daughter, along with their coterie and urged by the Russian N. Repnin, contributed to persuade the king to sign his abdication on 25 November, as they feared that his refusal would lead to a Russian confiscation of their property and their ruin.

On 9 September 1801, she and her daughter donated the Kazanowski Palace as a residence for the French royal claimant Louis XVIII. She spent her last years in Vienna.
