= Izabela Elżbieta Morsztyn =

Polish noblewoman (1671–1756)

Izabela Elżbieta Czartoryska
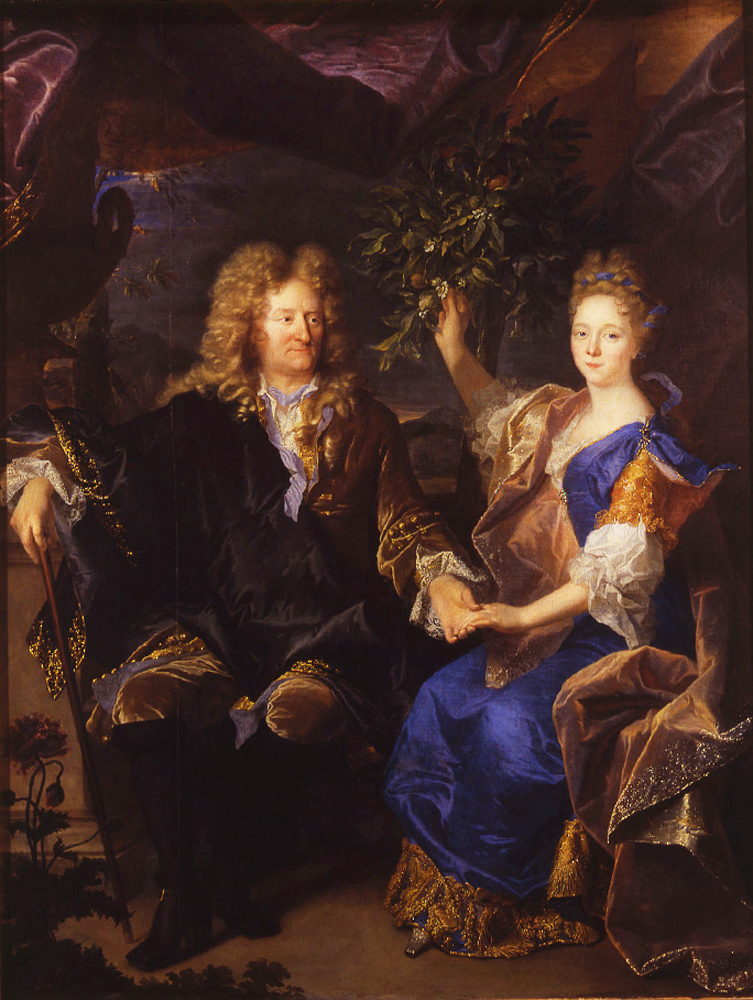
- Izabela Elżbieta Morsztyn with her father
- Coat of arms: Leliwa
- Born: 26 August 1671
- Died: 24 February 1756 (aged 84)
- Noble family: Morsztyn
- Husband: Kazimierz Czartoryski
- Issue: with Kazimierz Czartoryski; Michał Fryderyk Czartoryski; August Aleksander Czartoryski; Konstancja Czartoryska; Ludwika Elżbieta Czartoryska; Teodor Kazimierz Czartoryski
- Father: Jan Andrzej Morsztyn
- Mother: Maria Katarzyna Gordon

Princess Izabela Elżbieta Czartoryska (née Countess Morsztyn; 1671 – 1756) was a Polish noblewoman, known for her political salon and role in the Familia party.

== Life ==
She was the daughter of Jan Andrzej Morsztyn and Maria Katarzyna Gordon, and married Kazimierz Czartoryski in 1693. Through her daughter Konstancja she became the grandmother of king Stanisław August Poniatowski.

Along with her husband she supported Prince of Conti as a candidate to the Polish throne. In 1736 in Warsaw, she established the first political salon, where politicians met and the Familia party conferred. Women played a significant role in those meetings.
