= Andrzej Mokronowski =

Polish general (1713–1784)

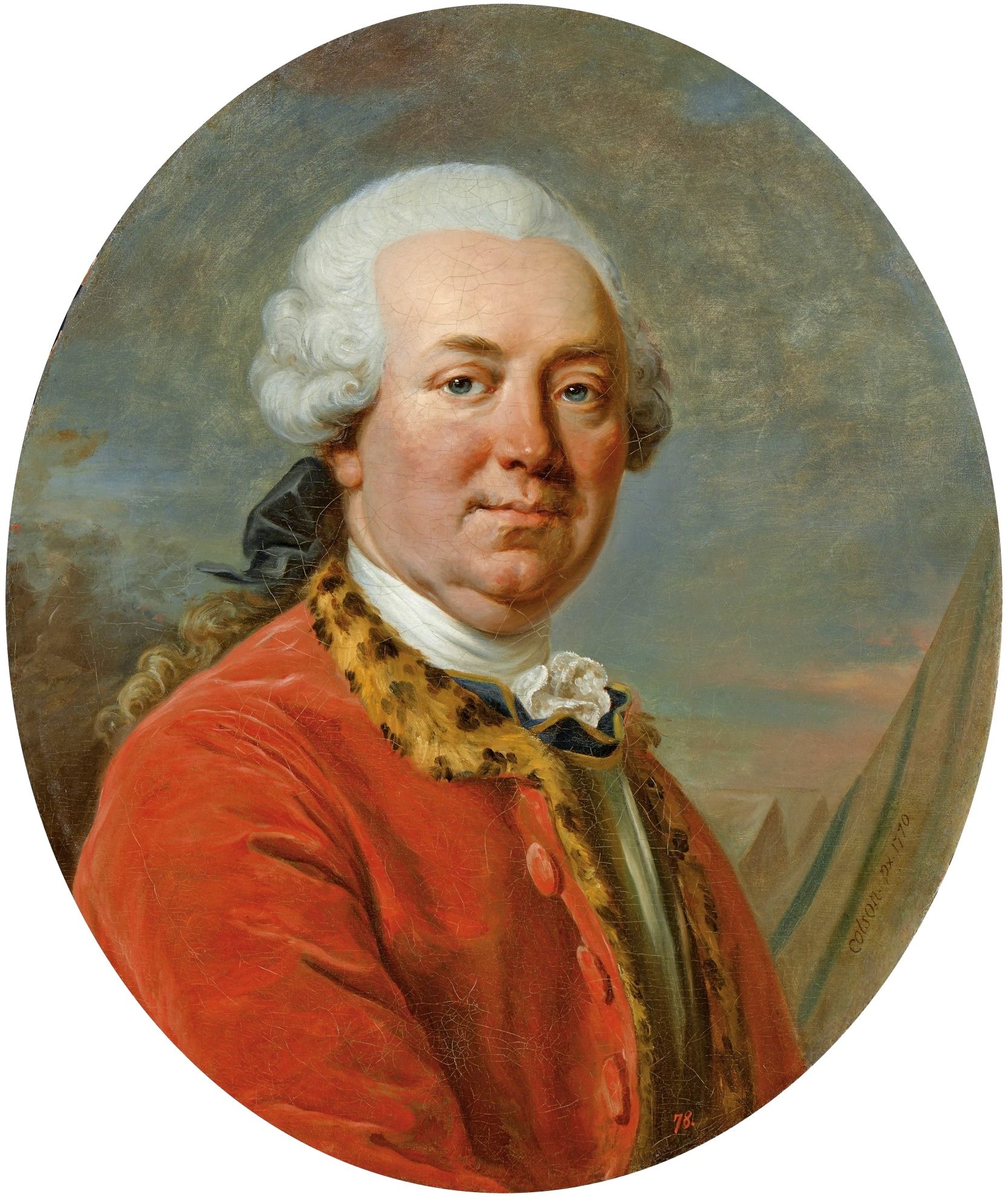
- Portrait by Jean-François Gilles Colson
- Coat of arms: Bogorya coat of arms
- Born: 25 May 1713; Warsaw
- Died: 14 June 1784 (aged 71); Warsaw
- Family: Mokronowski
- Spouses: Spouses; NN Castelli; Zofia von Bunau; Izabella Poniatowska

Andrzej Mokronowski (1713–1784) was a member of the Polish szlachta, a politician and general of the Polish Army.

He was the first Polish Mason and founder of the first Masonic Lodge in Poland, which opened in 1742 in Wisniowiec. He subsequently founded another lodge in 1744 in Warsaw.

He was made a Knight of the Order of the White Eagle, in 1776, and served as Marshal of the Sejm from August 26 to October 31, 1776, in Warsaw.

He was voivode of the Masovian Voivodeship from 1781.

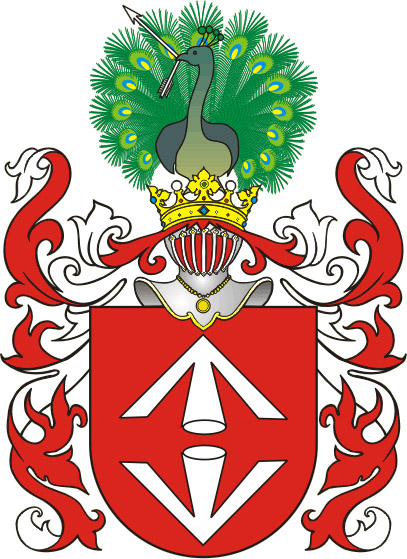
Bogorya coat of arms

== Bibliography ==
- Zbigniew Dunin-Wilczyński, Order Świętego Stanisława, Warszawa 2006, s. 183.
- Stanisław Małachowski-Łempicki, Wykaz polskich lóż wolnomularskich oraz ich członków w latach 1738 - 1821 poprzedzony zarysem historji wolnomularstwa polskiego i ustroju Wielkiego Wschodu Narodowego * Polskiego, Kraków 1929, s. 36
- Volumina Legum, t. IX, Kraków 1889, s. 2.
- Józef Zaleski, Panowanie Stanisława Augusta Poniatowskiego do czasu Sejmu Czteroletniego, 1887, s. 21, Dyaryusz seymu convocationis siedmio-niedzielnego warszawskiego : zdania, mowy, projekta y manifesta w sobie zawierający przez sessye zebrany r.p. 1764, s. 4–6.
- S. Orgelbranda Encyklopedja Powszechna. Warszawa: Wydawnictwo Towarzystwa Akcyjnego Odlewni Czcionek i Drukarni S. Orgelbranda Synów, XIX i pocz. XX wieku
- Kazimierz Marian Morawski, Wolnomularstwo a Polska w dobie dziejowej przed rewolucją francuską, w: Pamiętnik V Zjazdu Historyków Polskich w Warszawie, t. I, Lwów 1930, s. 244.
- Mariusz Machynia, Czesław Srzednicki, Wojsko koronne. Sztaby i kawaleria, Kraków 2002, s. 32–33, kawalerowie i statuty Orderu Orła Białego 1705–2008, 2008, s. 217.
