= Maria Teresa Poniatowska =

Polish noblewoman

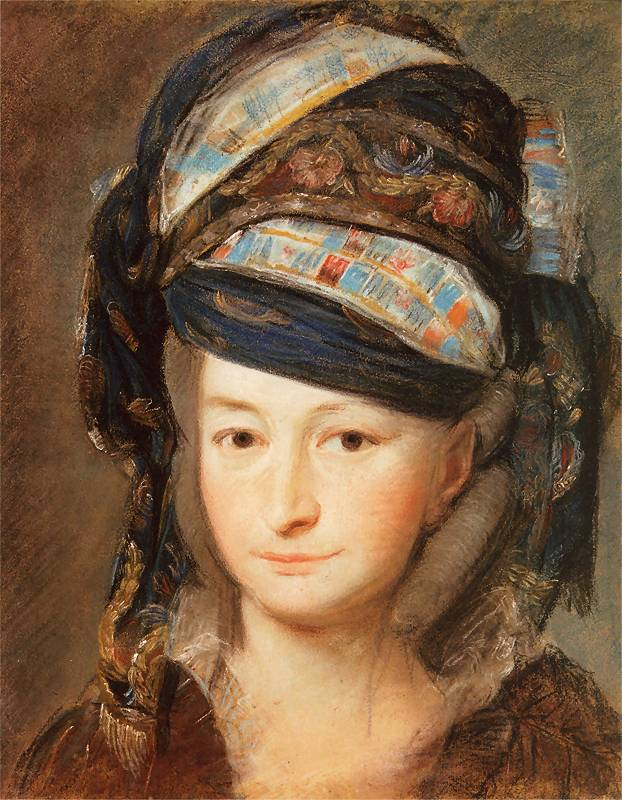
Maria Teresa by an unknown artist, c.1797.

Maria Teresa Antoinette Josephine Poniatowska (28 November 1760, Vienna, then under the Habsburg monarchy, now Austria – 2 November 1834, Tours, France) was a Polish noblewoman. She was the niece of king Stanisław August Poniatowski and sister of Prince Józef Poniatowski.

== Life ==
She was the eldest child of Maria Theresa, countess of Wchinitz and Tettau, and Andrzej Poniatowski, a Polish nobleman serving in the Austrian and Czech armies and brother of king Stanisław August Poniatowski. One of her godparents was empress Maria Theresa. Her father died of tuberculosis when she was thirteen and so Stanisław became her guardian.

Living in Vienna, she fell ill aged sixteen and had to have part of an eyeball removed. When she reached eighteen in 1778, king Stanisław arranged for her to marry Count Wincenty Tyszkiewicz, Leliwa coat of arms, count of Łohojsk and Świsłocz and clerk of the Grand Duchy of Lithuania. However, the marriage proved unsuccessful and she soon left her husband. From 1807 to 1837, she was closely associated with the French foreign minister Charles-Maurice de Talleyrand-Périgord.

== Sources ==
- http://www.zamek-krolewski.pl/blogi-zamku-krolewskiego/poniatoviana/posty/maria-teresa-tyszkiewicz-1
