= Regimentarz =

Military commander in Poland

A Regimentarz (from Latin: regimentum) was a military commander in Poland, since the 16th century, of an army group or a substitute of a Hetman. They were nominated by the King of Poland or the Sejm.

In the 17th century a Regimentarz was also the commander of Pospolite ruszenie in cases where a castellan or a voivode could not command personally.

Regimentarz generalny (General) were the commanders of Confederations.

== See also ==
- Offices in Polish-Lithuanian Commonwealth
