= Michał Fryderyk Czartoryski =

Polish nobleman (1696–1775)

- Grand Chancellor of Lithuania
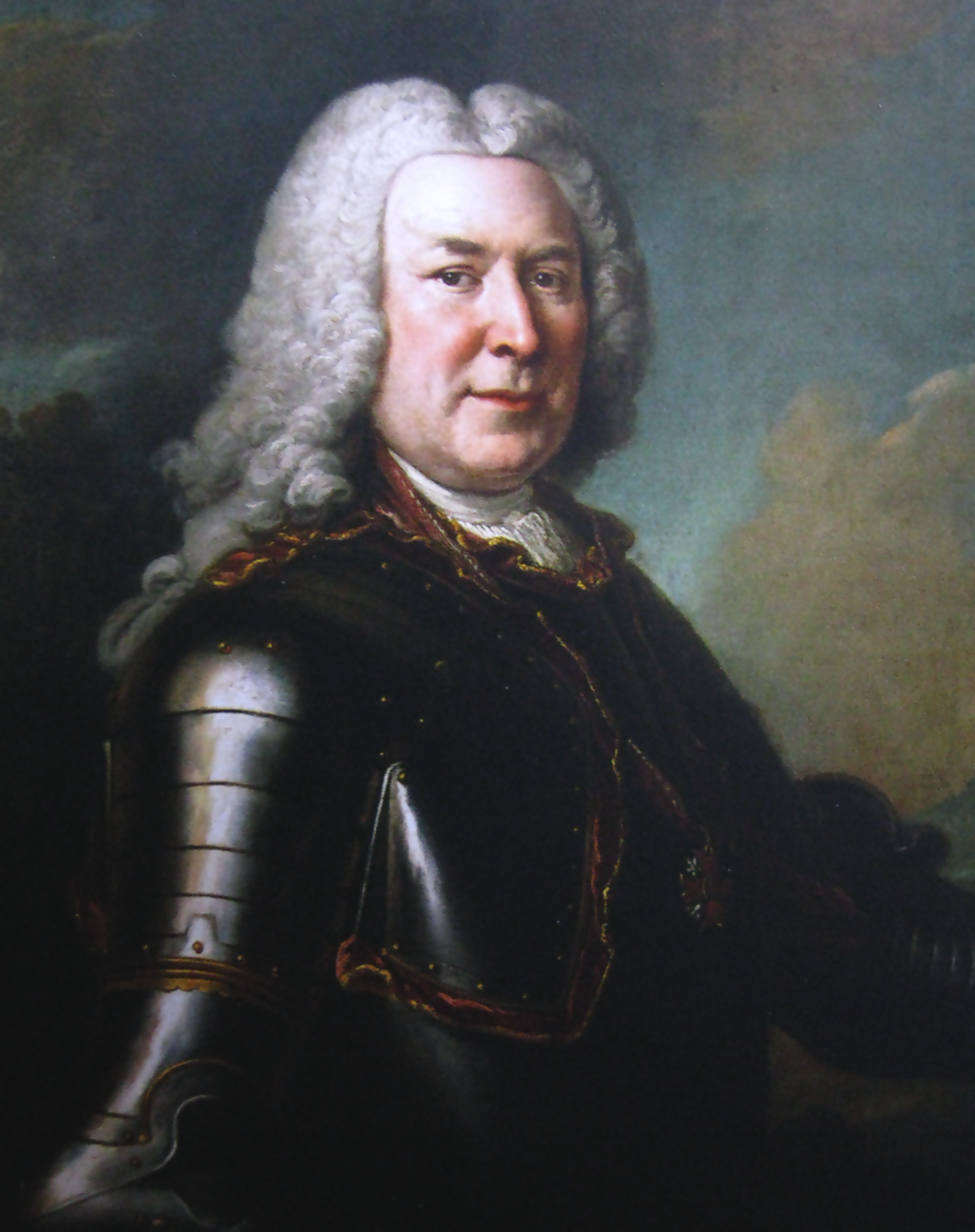
- Portrait by Louis de Silvestre
- Coat of arms: Czartoryski
- Born: 26 April 1696; Klewań, Poland
- Died: 13 August 1775 (aged 79); Warsaw, Poland
- Noble family: Czartoryski
- Spouse: Elenora Monika Waldstein
- Issue: Antonina Czartoryska; Konstancja Czartoryska; Aleksandra Czartoryska
- Father: Kazimierz Czartoryski
- Mother: Izabela Elżbieta Morsztyn

Prince Michał Fryderyk Czartoryski (1696–1775) was a Polish–Lithuanian nobleman, the Duke of Klewań and Żuków, magnate, and Knight of the Order of the White Eagle (from 1726). He headed Poland's Czartoryski "Familia".

He served as Steward of Lithuania from 1720, Castellan of Vilnius from 1722, Grand Chancellor of Lithuania from 1752, and Starost of Grod, Luck, Uświat, Jurbol, Homel, Kupsk and Pienian.

== Biography ==
Czartoryski was born in 1696 in Klewań, Poland. After an education on the French model, which he completed at Paris, Florence and Rome, he attached himself to the court of Dresden, and through the influence of Count Fleming, the leading minister there, obtained the vice-chancellorship of Lithuania and many other dignities. Czartoryski was one of the many Polish nobles who, when Augustus II was seriously ill at Białystok in 1727, signed the secret declaration guaranteeing the Polish succession to his son; but this did not prevent him from repudiating his obligations when Stanisław Leszczyński was placed upon the throne by the influence of France in 1733. When Stanislaus abdicated in 1735, Czartoryski voted for Augustus III of Saxony, who gladly employed him and his family to counteract the influence of competing factions.

For the next forty years Czartoryski was the leading Polish statesman. In foreign affairs he was the first to favour an alliance with Russia, Austria and England, as opposed to France and Prussia—a system difficult to sustain and not always beneficial to Poland or Saxony. In Poland Czartoryski was at the head of the party of reform. His palace was the place where the most promising young gentlemen of the day were educated and sent abroad that they might return as his coadjutors in his work. His plan aimed at the restoration of the royal prerogative and the abolition of the liberum veto, which made any durable improvement impossible. These patriotic endeavours made the Czartoryskis very unpopular with the szlachta (nobility), but for many years they had the firm and constant support of the Saxon court, especially after Brühl succeeded Fleming.

Czartoryski reached the height of his power in 1752 when he was entrusted with the Great Seal of Lithuania, but after that date the influence of his rival Mniszek began to prevail at Dresden, whereupon Czartoryski sought a reconciliation with his political opponents at home and foreign support both in England and Russia. In 1755 he sent his nephew Stanisław Poniatowski to Saint Petersburg as Saxon minister, a mission which failed completely. Czartoryski's pro-Russian policy had by this time estranged Brühl, but he frustrated all the plans of the Saxon court by dissolving the diets of 1760, 1761 and 1762. In 1763 he went a step further and proposed the dethronement of Augustus III, who however died the same year.

During the ensuing interregnum, the prince chancellor worked at the convocation diet of 1764 to reform the constitution, and it was with displeasure that he saw his nephew Stanisław finally elected king Stanisław II August in 1765. But though disgusted with the weakness of the king and obliged to abandon at last all hope of the amelioration of his country, Czartoryski continued to hold office till the last, and as chancellor of Lithuania he sealed all the partition treaties.

Czartoryski died in the full possession of his faculties and was considered by the Russian minister Repnin "the soundest head in the kingdom." He was not the sole reforming statesman of his day, and despite his services there were occasions when the partisan in him got the better of the statesman. His foreign policy, moreover, was vacillating, and he changed his "system" frequently.

== Family ==
Prince Michał Czartoryski married Countess Elenora Monika Waldstein on 30 October 1726 in Prague. They had four children (three daughters, one son):

- Antonina (1728 - 26 February 1746, Warsaw), who married Jerzy Detloff Flemming on 13 February 1744 in Warsaw.
- Konstancja (1729-1749), second wife of Jerzy Flemming.
- Aleksandra (1730-1798)
- Antoni (1732-1753)

== Bibliography ==
- Władysław Konopczyński, Michał Fryderyk Czartoryski, w: Polski Słownik Biograficzny, t. IV, Kraków 1938 s. 288-294.
- Krystyna Zienkowska, Stanisław August Poniatowski, Wrocław 1998.
- Wojciech Kriegseisen, Sejmiki Rzeczypospolitej Szlacheckiej w XVII i XVIII wieku, Warszawa 1991.
- Marcin Matuszewicz, Diariusz życia mego, tom 1 1714-1757, oprac. B. Królikowski, Warszawa 1986.
- Polska stanisławowska w oczach cudzoziemców, tom I, oprac. W. Zawadzki, Warszawa 1963.
- Polska stanisławowska w oczach cudzoziemców, tom II, oprac. W. Zawadzki, Warszawa 1963.
- Kazimierz Waliszewski, Potoccy i Czartoryscy. Walka stronnictw i programów politycznych. Przed upadkiem Rzeczypospolitej 1734 – 1763, Kraków 1887.
- Emanuel Rostworowski, O polską koronę. Polityka Francji w latach 1725 – 1733, Wrocław 1958.
