= Familia (political party) =

The Family Polish: Familia
- Leaders: Michał Czartoryski; August Czartoryski; Konstancja Czartoryska; Stanisław Poniatowski
- Founded: 1731
- Dissolved: 1795
- Headquarters: Vilnius
- Ideology: Reformism; Liberalism; Nationalism

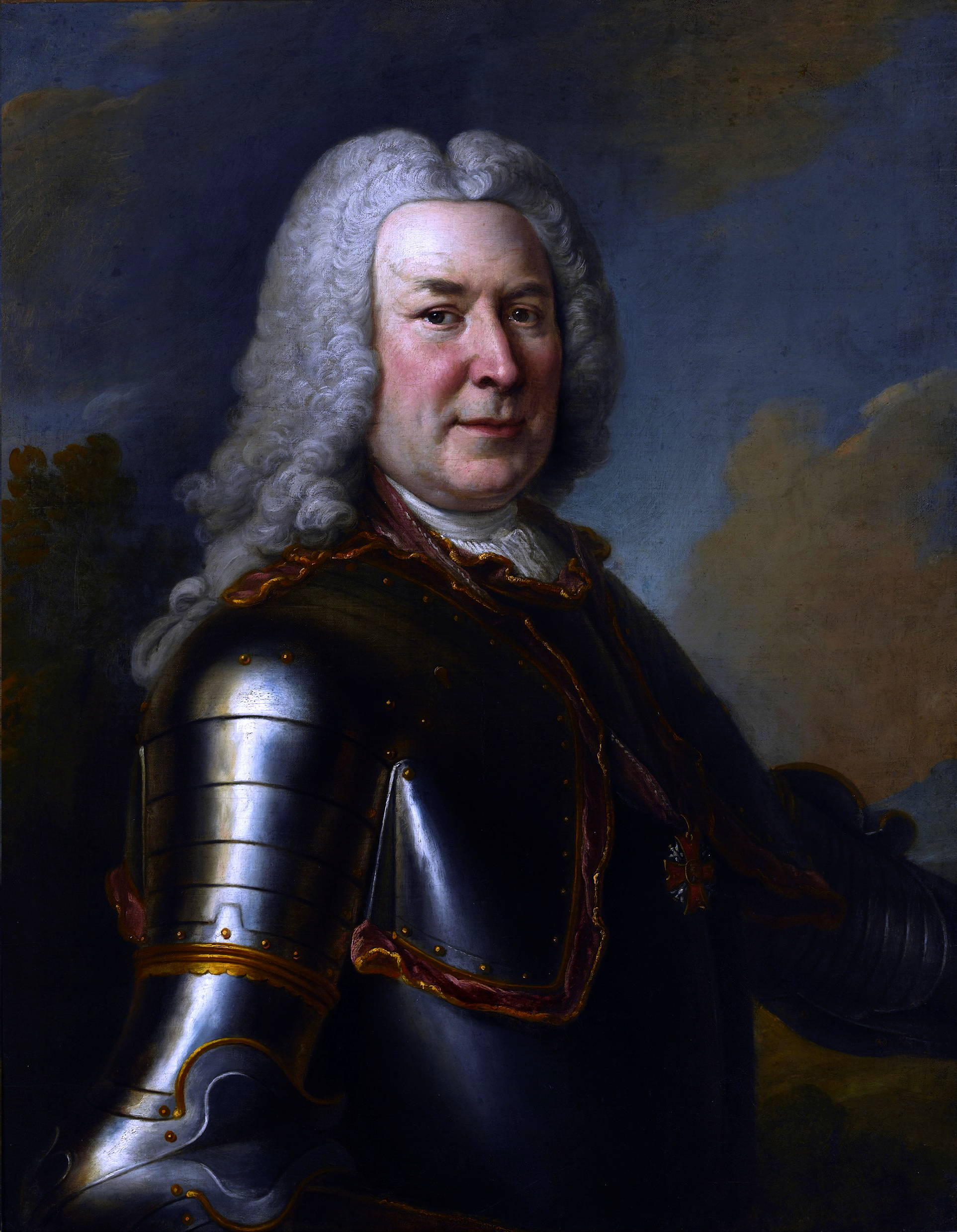
Michał Fryderyk Czartoryski (portrait by Louis de Silvestre), one of the leaders of Familia

The Familia ("The Family", from Latin familia) was the name of an 18th-century Polish Political faction led by the House of Czartoryski and allied families. It was formed towards the end of the reign of King of Poland Augustus II the Strong (reign. 1697–1706, 1709–1733). The Familia's principal leaders were Michał Fryderyk Czartoryski, Grand Chancellor of Lithuania, his brother August Aleksander Czartoryski, Voivode of Ruthenia (Rus), their sister Konstancja Czartoryska, and their brother-in-law (from 1720), Stanisław Poniatowski, Castellan of Kraków.

== Formation ==
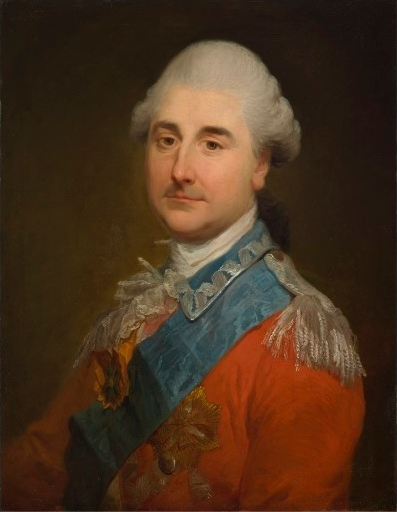
Stanisław August Poniatowski was Familia's candidate to the Polish throne in 1764

The origins of the Familia as a political party are in the last decade of the reign of August II. The Czartoryski family belonged to the royal bloodline, but was relatively poor. It was the political opportunism of Kazimierz Czartoryski that allowed the family to retain their wealth during the Great Northern War, and Kazimierz would soon reach leading political positions under August II. The family's political position was further strengthened by the political debut of Michał Fryderyk Czartoryski in 1718 when he entered the Sejm for the first time, showing remarkable talent in uniting his supporters amongst the nobility. After amassing immense fortune in 1731, he would start financing his family's political endeavours, with the main goal becoming reforming the Commonwealth.

In 1724, the family already held the Lithuanian subchancellorship, the Lithuanian treasury, the Crown artillery generalcy and the Castellany of Vilnius. This elevation of the leaders of the Familia sparked conflicts with the old guard amongst the nobility represented by the Potocki family, the Radziwiłłs, Wiśniowieckis, Sapiehs and Oginskis; already around 1725 this conflict was evident. From 1728 onwards, a fierce battle would rage between the Potockis and the Familia was fought to prevent Poniatowski from taking the mullet; according to the law in force, the King could only confer the office of Hetman at the Sejm, after the Marshal had been elected. The Potockis' private ambitions fell victim to successive Sejm sessions during which the Speaker's election was not allowed (1729, 1730, 1732). From the end of 1730, the Familia understood that August II would only be able to realise his absolutist plans to the detriment of Poland (and at the same time at the expense of the Familia), and distanced itself from him, although officially remaining a court party.

The year 1731 was a breakthrough for the party; in the summer of that year, through the marriage of August Aleksander to Maria Zofia Denhof, heiress to the great Sieniawski fortune, the Familia gained a material basis for the realisation of its political aspirations; because of this, 1731 is considered to be beginning of the party. In the autumn of 1731, the King, who did not intend to bow to the opposition and abandon his support for the Czartoryskis, endowed Prince August with the Ruthenian Voivodeship, and Stanisław Poniatowski with the Mazovian Voivodeship. Well aware of the balance of power in Poland, the French resident Perteville appreciated the growing importance of the Familia and, from at least the beginning of 1731, worked to drag it into the camp France was building to elect Stanisław Leszczyński to the Polish throne after the death of August II. The Potocki opposition and the Lithuanian opposition co-operating with it against the King and the Familia were oriented towards imperial courts hostile to the strengthening of Poland (Prussia was subordinating its policy in Poland to Russia at this time); from 1729 onwards, France joined these neighbouring guardians of the failure of the Sejm to come to an end.

== Familia after August II ==
During the interregnum in 1733, the Familia supported Stanisław I Leszczyński for King. Polish Kings in the period were elected by ballot, by the nobility (Elective Monarchy). The Familia decided to support the Saxon Frederick Augustus II as candidate (elected King Augustus III - reign. 1734–1763 in Poland), instead, and thus became a party of the Royal Court. Following the failure of the Polish Sejm to pass reforms (between 1744 and 1750) the Familia distanced itself from the struggling Royal Court. In foreign affairs, they now represented a pro-Russian orientation (see "War of Polish Succession").

During the next Polish interregnum (1763–1764) near the end of the "Seven Years' War" in Europe, an armed Russian intervention in Poland gave the Familia the opportunity to vanquish their opponents at home. When in 1764 Adam Kazimierz Czartoryski declined to seek election to the throne, the Czartoryskis agreed to the election, instead, of their kinsman Stanisław August Poniatowski, a one-time lover of the Russian Empress Catherine II "the Great".

The Czartoryski family now stood at the forefront of the reform current, and decided to strengthen the central power in order to curb the supremacy of the magnates, introduced a standing army and enacted egalitarian reforms with aim to protect the poorer gentry who enlisted in the government offices and in the army. Around the same time, the Familia succeeded in partially enacting their previous program of reforms. Among others, this included the creation of a Royal Treasury and military commissions who limited the power of Treasurers and Hetmans. The disruptive liberum veto was suspended.

Summarizing Familia's reforms, Polish historian Bolesław Limanowski concluded: "It was thus a state-democratic programme, so to speak, because it strove to make the social system more democratic, with the state's interests at the forefront. The Czartoryski family did a lot. In a short space of time, it carried out such important reforms that, according to the French historian Rulhiere, French kings needed as many as four centuries to achieve."

Further reforms were, however, blocked by Russian and Prussian interference. The conservative opponents of the Familia and the King, backed by Russia's Catherine II, formed, in 1767, the Radom Confederation. At the infamous Repnin Sejm, they were obliged to repeal part of the recently introduced reforms for fear of further unwanted intervention. Nevertheless, their reforms sparked a reaction by pro-Russian magnates who formed the Bar Confederation.

== Familia in the period of Partitions ==
After the First Partition of Poland (February 17, 1772), the Familia became the core of magnate opposition to the King and the Permanent Council, while seeking support in Austria (only to shift in 1788 to a pro-Prussian stance). At the Four-Year Sejm (1788–1792), it was only in 1790 that Familia's representatives, which included Ignacy Potocki, effected a rapprochement with the King and his party. Together with him and the Patriotic Party the Familia now worked towards the enactment of Poland's revolutionary May 3rd Constitution in 1791.

== See also ==
- Szlachta
- List of szlachta
- Magnates of Poland and Lithuania
- Princely houses of Poland and Lithuania
