= Marcello Bacciarelli =

Italian-born Polish painter (1731–1818)

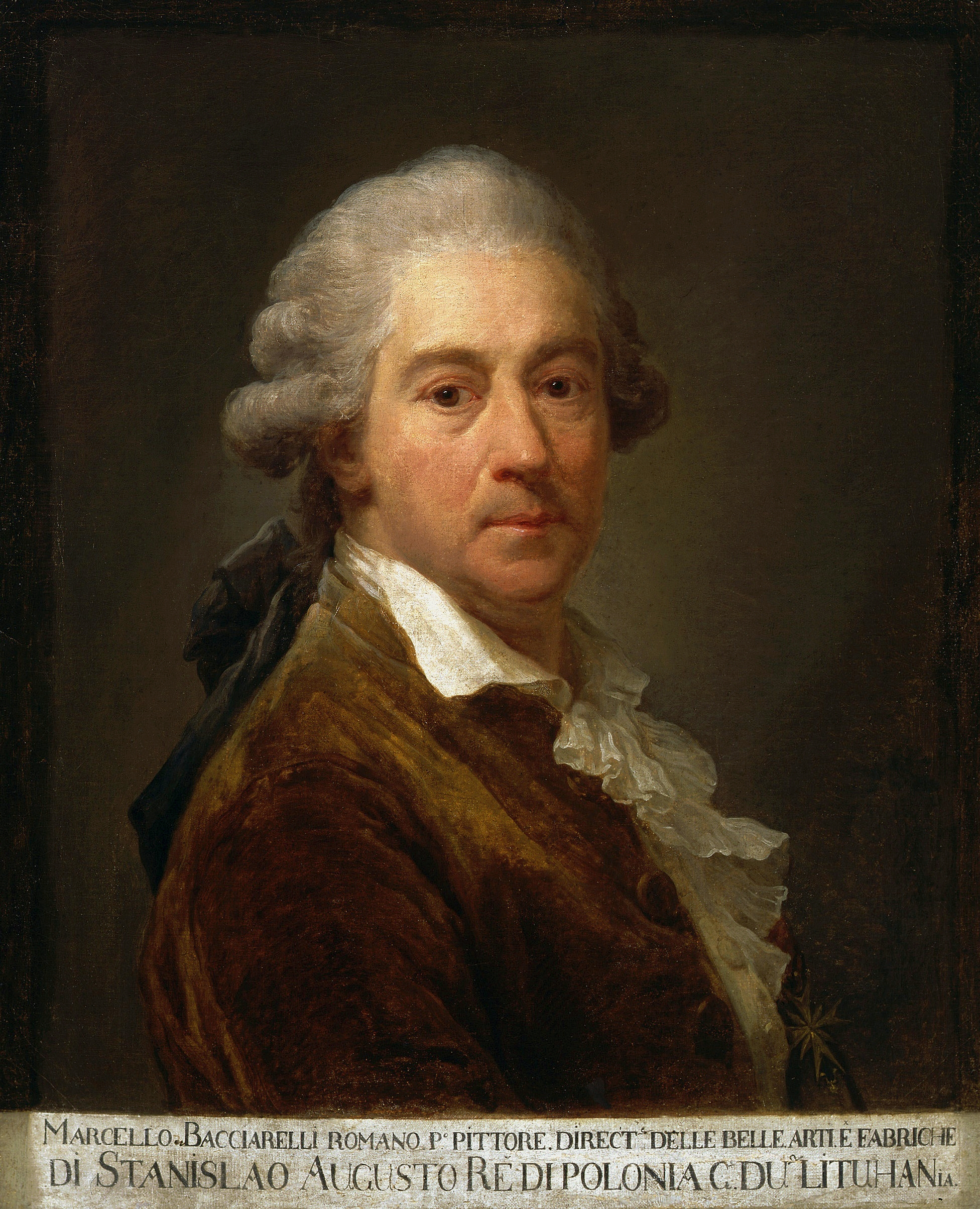
- Self-portrait, 1793
- Born: 16 February 1731; Rome, Papal States
- Died: 5 January 1818 (aged 86); Warsaw, Congress Poland
- Known for: Painting, drawing
- Movement: Baroque, Neoclassicism
- Patrons: Stanisław August Poniatowski

Marcello Bacciarelli (Italian pronunciation: [marˈtʃɛllo battʃaˈrɛlli]; 16 February 1731 – 5 January 1818) was an Italian-born painter of the late-baroque and Neoclassic periods active in Poland and the Polish–Lithuanian Commonwealth.

== Biography ==
He was born in Rome, and studied there under Marco Benefial. In 1750, with the recommendation of the architect Gaetano Chiaveri, Marcello was recruited to Dresden in Saxony, where he was employed by Elected King Augustus III of Poland. After the death of King Augustus, Marcello went to Vienna, and thence to Warsaw. In Dresden, he met Bernardo Bellotto and worked with this Italian painter throughout his life. He was recruited by King Stanisław II Augustus in 1766 to become the Director of the newly founded Royal Buildings and Estates.

In Dresden, he married Friederike Richter, a woman painter known for miniature portraits. In Vienna, Marcello painted portraits of the imperial family, including the four daughters of Maria Teresa, Maria Christina, Duchess of Teschen and her husband, prince Albert. In Warsaw, he painted a set of portraits depicting nearly all Polish kings, from Bolesław I the Brave to the last king of the Polish–Lithuanian Commonwealth, Stanisław II Augustus who was also Bacciarelli's patron and admirer. He also made a portrait of Izabela Lubomirska in her wedding gown, that she commissioned years later after her marriage. Bacciarelli was also keen in painting culturally significant scenes from the history of Poland. Following the partitions of Poland and after Napoleon's rise to power he moved to the Duchy of Warsaw, a client state of the First French Empire and died in 1818.

A number of his paintings were painted for King Stanisław II Augustus of Poland and are in the Royal Castle in Warsaw. These include:

- Strength, Reason, Belief, and Justice, in the Old Audience Chamber
- The Flourishing of the Arts, Sciences, Agriculture, and Trade on the ceiling of the Old Audience Chamber
- Rebecca and Eleazar in the King's Bedroom
- Esther and Ahasuerus in the King's Bedroom

During Bacciarelli's early years in Warsaw, the young Alexander Kucharsky began to train as a painter in his studio. Another notable pupil of Bacciarelli's was Kazimierz Wojniakowski.

== Gallery ==
Works of Marcello Bacciarelli located in the Royal Palace in Warsaw.

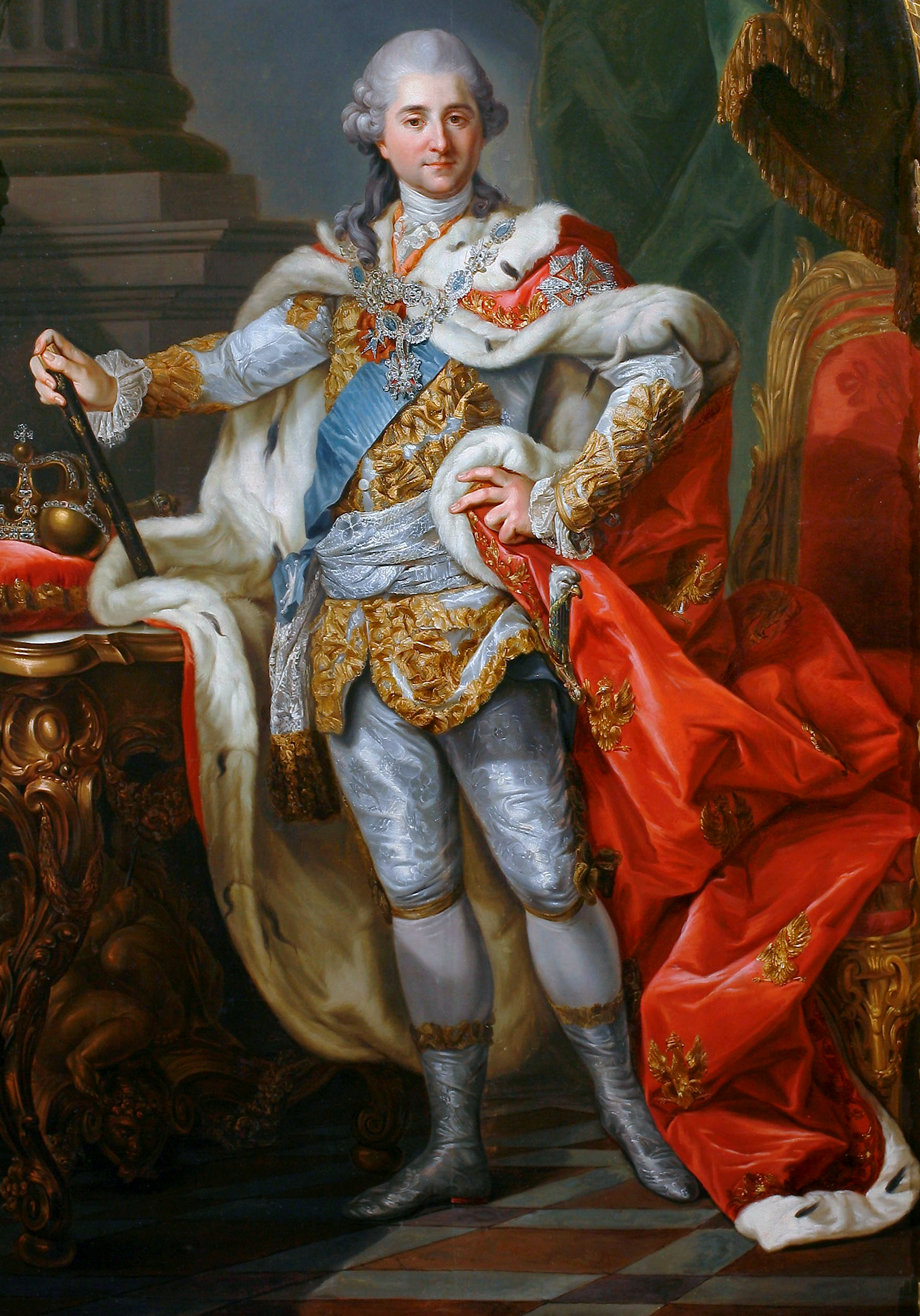
Stanisław II Augustus, King of Poland

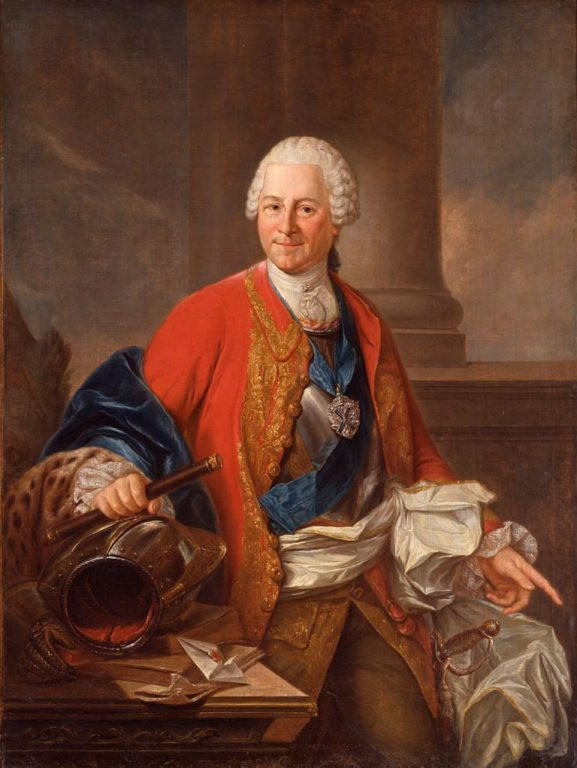
Count Brühl

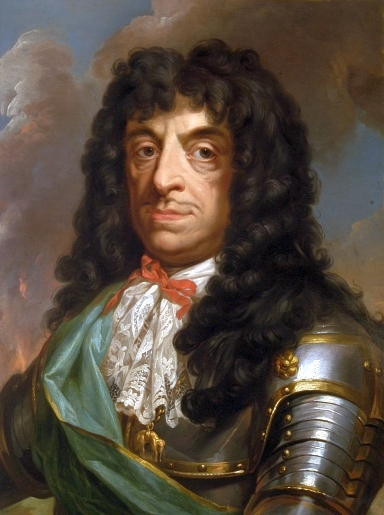
King John II Casimir

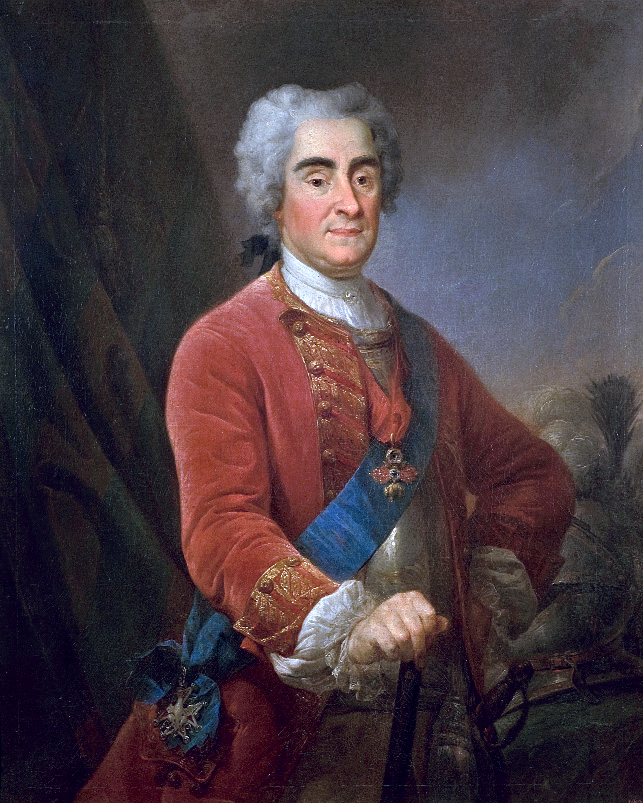
Augustus the Strong

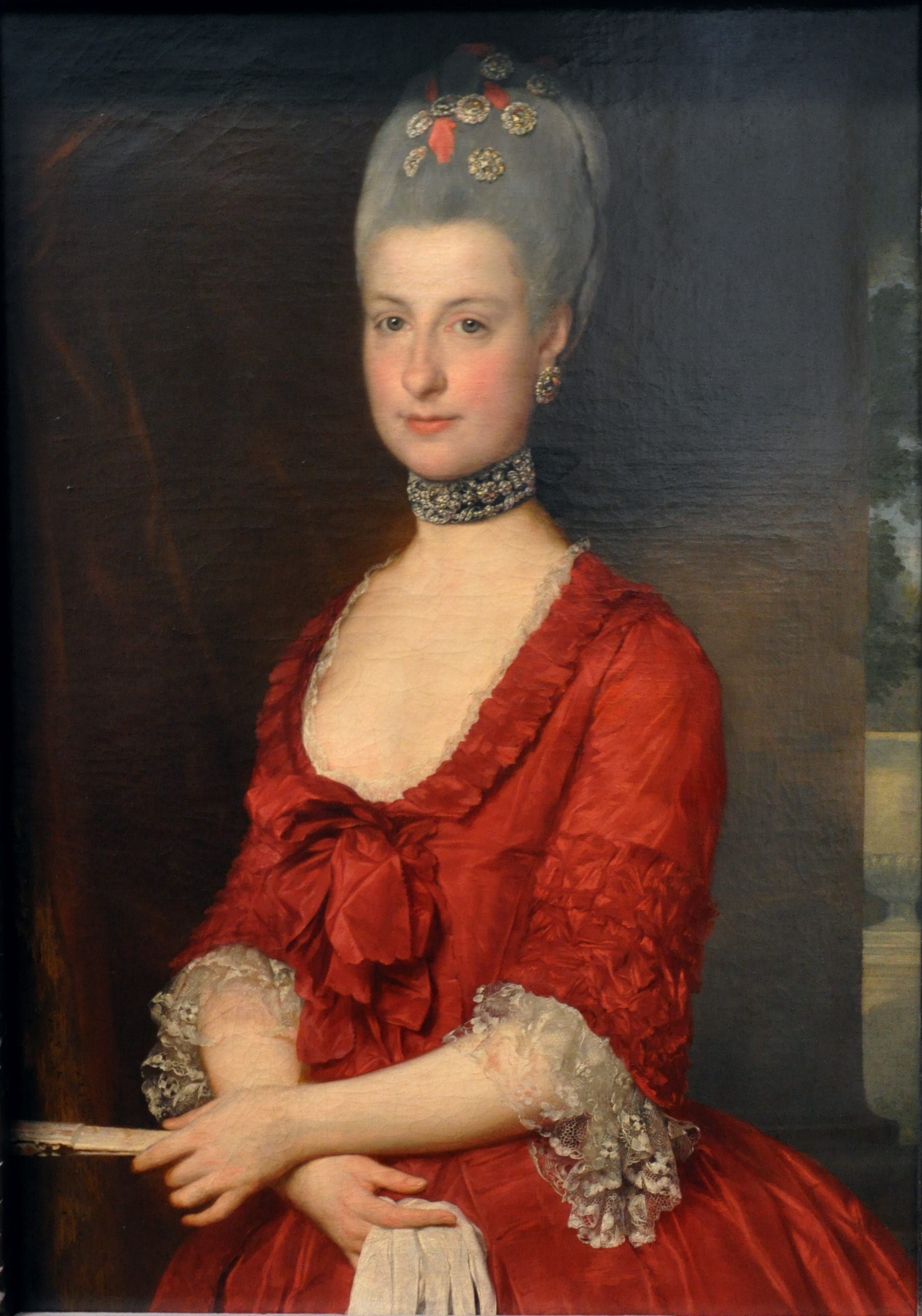
Archduchess Maria Christina

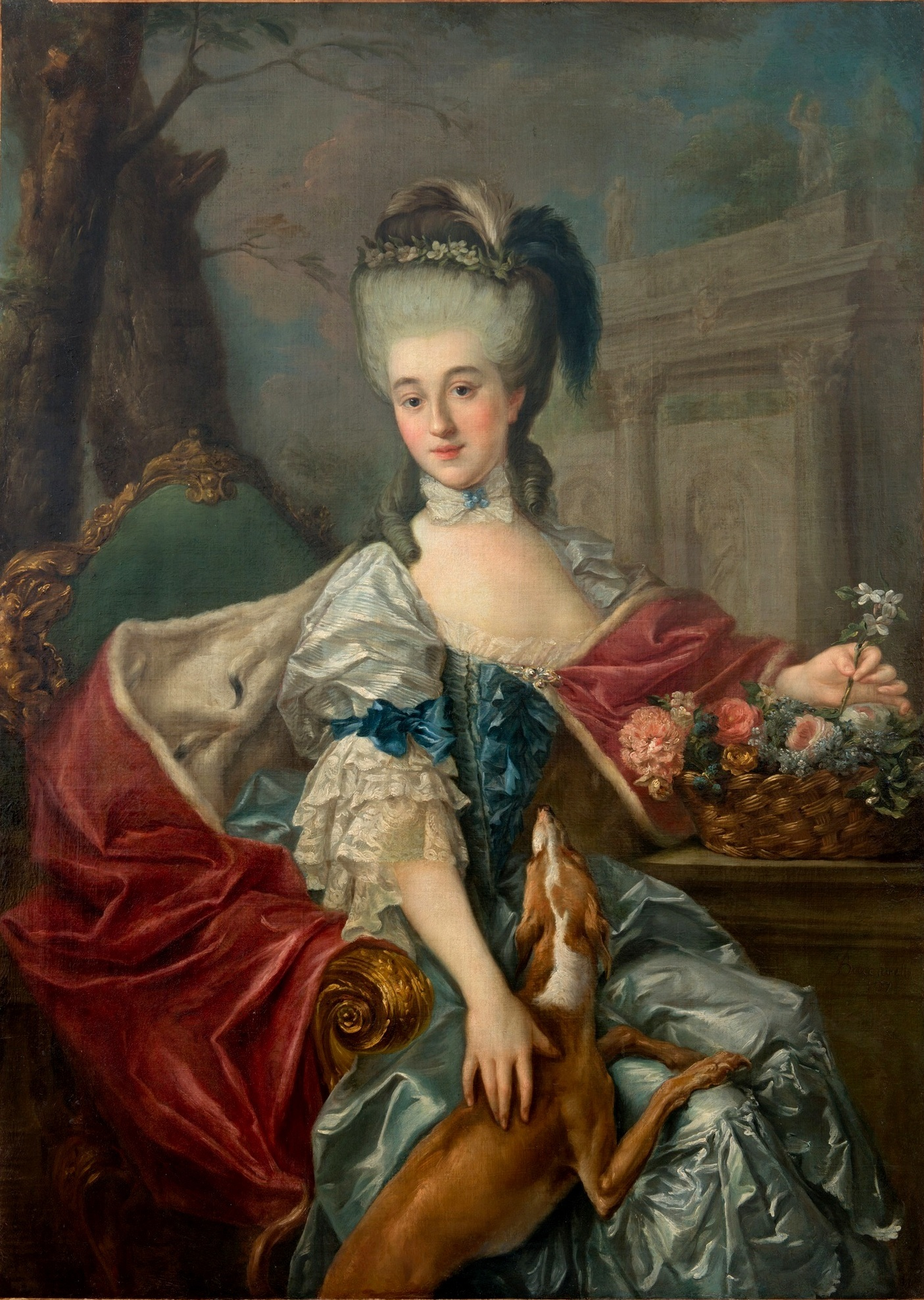
Princess Izabela Lubomirska"Blue Marquise"

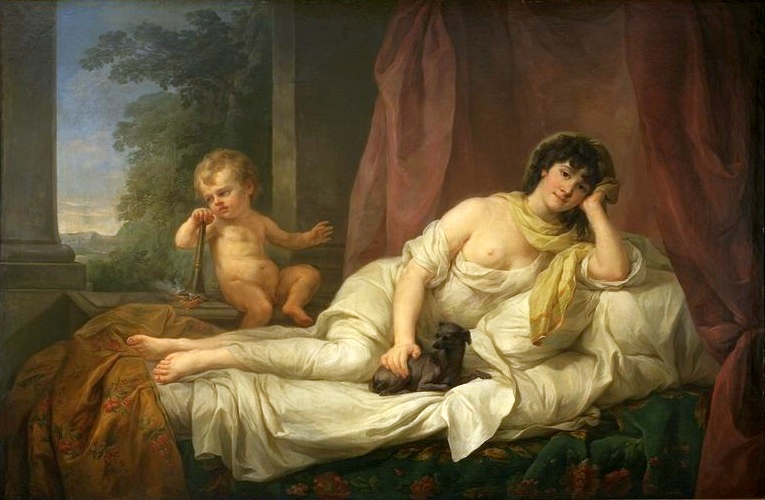
Anna Lampel

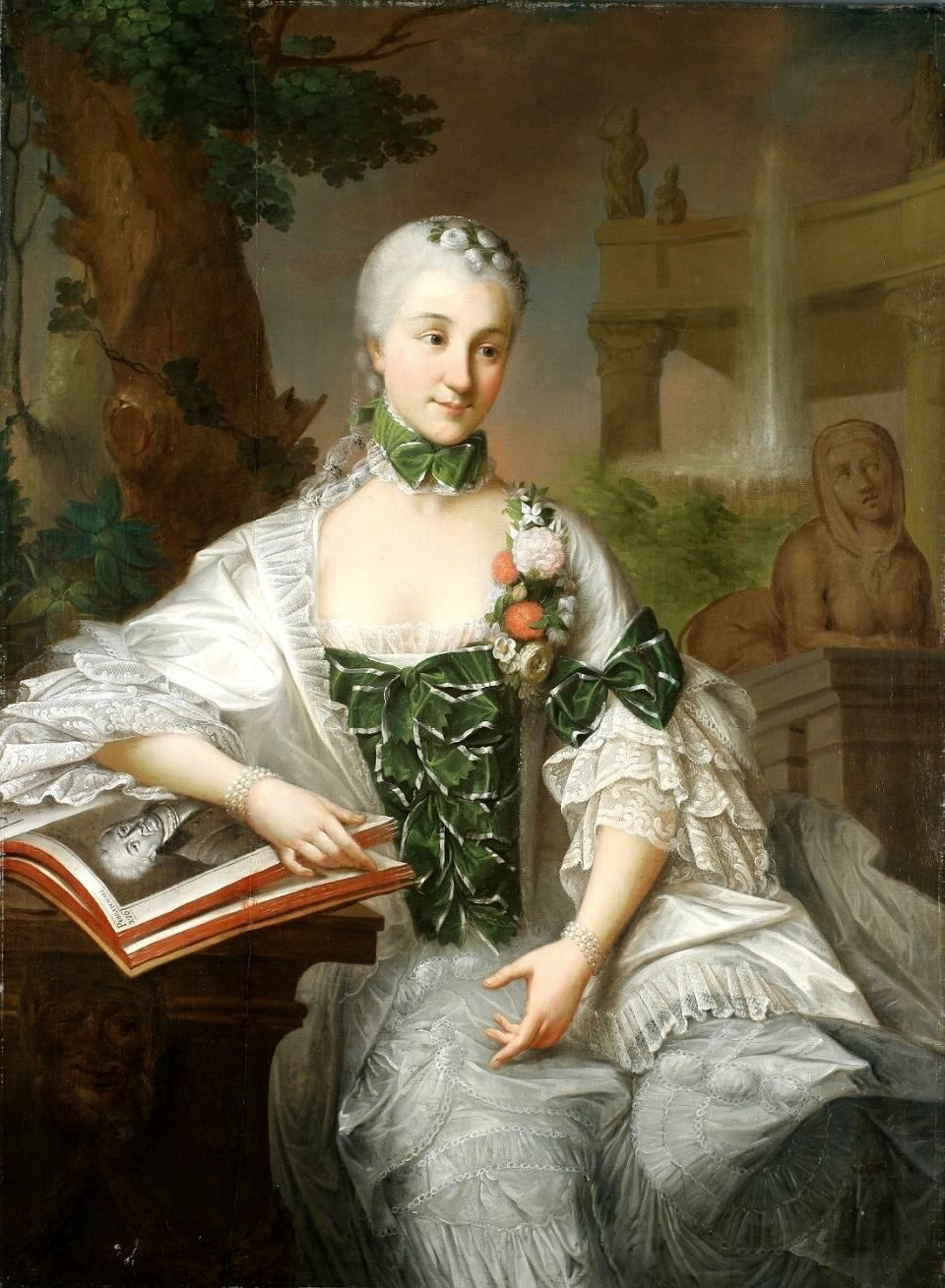
Countess Izabella Poniatowska

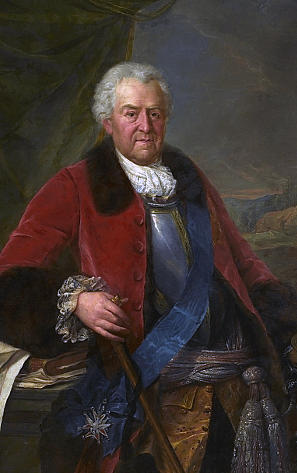
Stanisław Ponia- towski

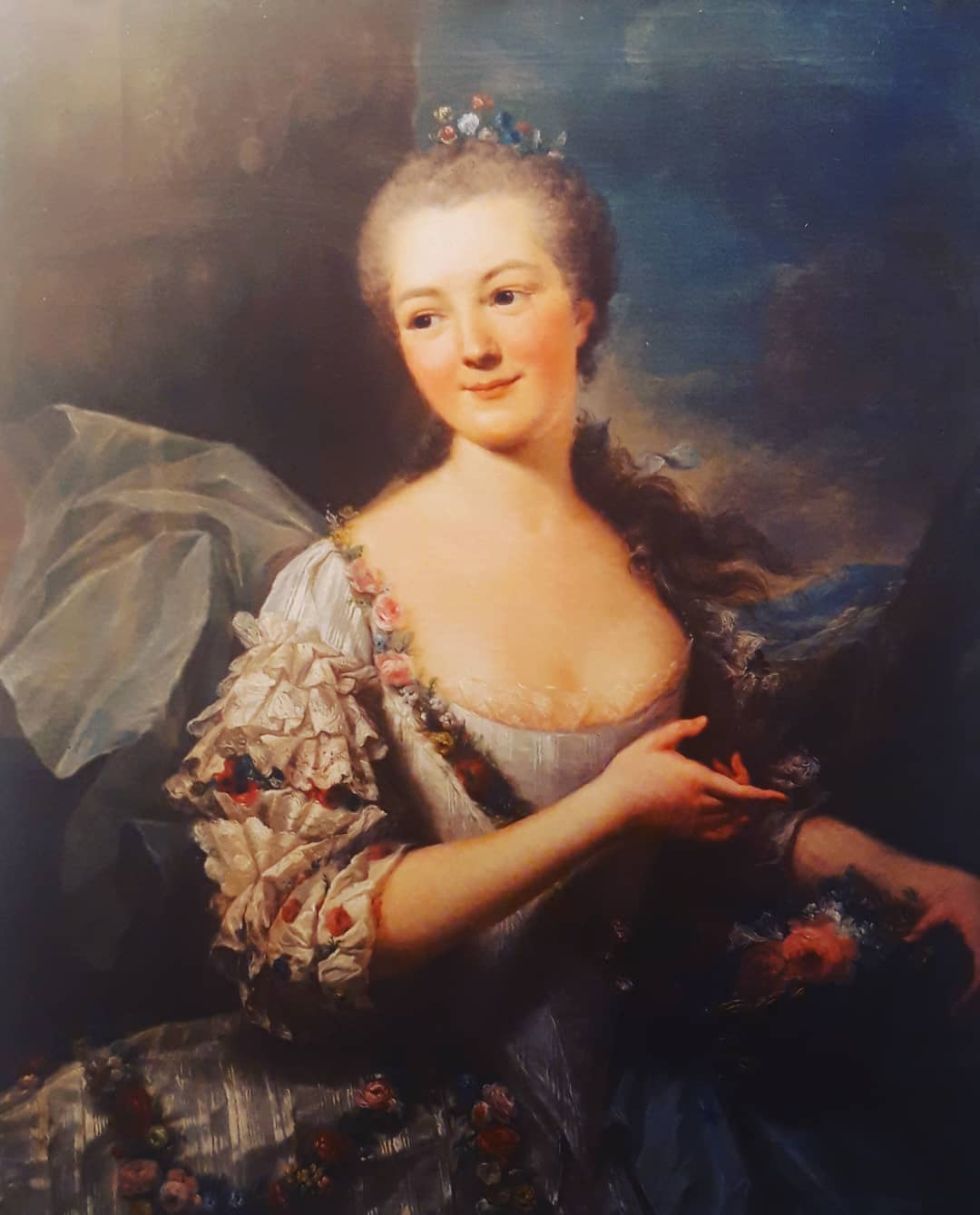
Countess Henrietta Friederika von Bünau

== Sources ==
- Bryan, Michael (1886). Robert Edmund Graves (ed.). Dictionary of Painters and Engravers, Biographical and Critical. Vol. I: A-K. London: George Bell and Sons. p. 66.
