= Pact Ribbentrop - Beck =

2012 novel by Piotr Zychowicz

- First edition
- Author: Piotr Zychowicz
- Language: Polish
- Published: 2012
- Publisher: Dom Wydawniczy Rebis
- Publication place: Poland

Pact Ribbentrop - Beck (Polish: Pakt Ribbentrop - Beck) is an alternative history novel by the Polish journalist and writer Piotr Zychowicz. The book, whose full title is Pact Ribbentrop - Beck, or How Poles Could Have Defeated the Soviet Union alongside the Third Reich (Polish: Pakt Ribbentrop - Beck czyli jak Polacy mogli u boku III Rzeszy pokonać Związek Radziecki), was published in 2012 by Dom Wydawniczy Rebis from Poznań.

Zychowicz argues that the government of the Second Polish Republic should have accepted Adolf Hitler's offer of a joint Polish-German attack on the Soviet Union, which would have together captured Moscow. "Beck" refers to Józef Beck, the 1930s Polish foreign minister. "Ribbentrop" refers to Joachim von Ribbentrop, the German foreign minister.

== Background ==
Piotr Zychowicz stated in a November 2012 interview: "This book is my answer to the question that all Poles ask. And the question is: did we have to bungle up World War II so badly? Did we have to lose half of our territory, together with Wilno and Lwów? Did we have to lose our elites, which were slaughtered? Did we have to lose millions of our citizens, murdered by totalitarian occupiers, the Germans and the Soviets? Did we have to lose our independence for 50 years? The answer to these questions is politically incorrect, because Poland was not doomed to fail. And the answer is included in my book, in which I write that history could have been different".

The webpage of the book states, "In the history of nations there are moments when one has to bite the bullet and allow for painful concessions. To give up in order to save the nation from destruction, and its citizens from slaughter. This was the situation of Poland in 1939. Piotr Zychowicz claims in his book that the decision to enter the war against Nazi Germany in an illusive alliance with France and Great Britain, was a grave mistake, for which we paid a horrible price. History could have turned in a different way. Instead of biting off more than we could chew, we should have used realpolitik. We should have made concessions to Hitler, and agreed for annexation of the Free City of Danzig into the Third Reich, as well as for the construction of an extraterritorial highway across the Polish Corridor. And then, together with the Germans, we should have attacked the Soviet Union. Forty valiant divisions of the Polish Army, fighting on the Eastern Front would have sealed the fate of Stalin's empire".

In the book, Zychowicz quotes a number of historians and publicists, such as Paweł Wieczorkiewicz, Andrzej Wielowieyski, Adolf Bocheński, Stanisław Mackiewicz, Władysław Studnicki, Jerzy Łojek, Grzegorz Górski, Rafał Ziemkiewicz, Stanisław Żerko, Mieczysław Pruszyński and Stanisław Swianiewicz. He also provides citations from the memoirs of such persons as Władysław Anders, Józef Beck, Jan Szembek, Juliusz Łukasiewicz, Clara Petacci, Kazimierz Sosnkowski, Edward Raczyński and August Zaleski.

== Summary ==
The author writes that by Poland not opposing Adolf Hitler in September 1939, the Second World War starts on April 9, 1940 with a German attack on Western Europe. After capturing Paris and defeating Belgium, the Netherlands, Norway, Denmark and France, on June 21, 1941, the Wehrmacht, together with the Polish Army, invades the Soviet Union. By the winter of 1941-1942, the Soviet Union ceases to exist. Poland and Germany divide its territory, but soon, relationships deteriorate. Meanwhile, Germany continues to battle the United Kingdom and the United States. The war is costly; by 1944, all of the main units of the Wehrmacht are in Western Front fighting the Allies, who land in France in the summer of 1944. In those circumstances, The Poles begin secret negotiations with the British and American governments, eventually switching sides and attacking the Third Reich. As Zychowicz writes, "At this point, Poland should have acted like Romania and Hungary in the late stages of World War II. Noticing German problems in the West, both countries initiated secret negotiations with the Allies. The British and the Americans gladly accepted the offer, understanding that it would weaken the potential of the Axis powers".

Finally, when the Third Reich prepares for a decisive battle in the West, the Polish Army invades Germany. Surprised, the Wehrmacht does not put up much resistance against the Poles, who capture Silesia, Eastern Prussia and Western Pomerania and cuts off all lines of communication with the German units that had remained in the occupied Soviet Union. In August 1945, the Western Allies capture Berlin, and Hitler kills himself.

Polish armoured divisions clear the Baltic states (Lithuania, Latvia and Estonia), which join the federation of Poland, Belarus and Ukraine: "The dream of Marshall Józef Piłsudski has become reality. Poland emerges as Great power. During a peace conference, which takes place at Polish Baltic Sea spa of Jurata, Winston Churchill, Harry Truman and Edward Śmigły-Rydz discuss the future of Europe".

== Reception ==
The book was met with mixed opinions among Polish historians. Professor Andrzej Nowak called it "harmful and unwise" and added that it "fulfills the wish of Russian and other propagandists, who claim that Poland dreamed of joining Hitler to murder Jews, but did not do it because of her own stupidity". Professor Stanisław Salmonowicz, a renowned expert on German-Polish relations, described the book's ideas as "insane" and pointed out several flaws in Zychowicz's reasoning. Adam Stohnij of the military portal www.1939.pl called the book a "military Blitzkrieg" and wrote that Zychowicz "comes up with a daring argument. In the situation that Poland found itself right before the war, the only chance to survive was an alliance with the Third Reich". Piotr A. Maciążek, a publicist of portal politykawschodnia.pl, called the book "a Polish Icebreaker" and wrote that Pakt Ribbentrop - Beck is "undoubtedly one of the most interesting and controversial books published in Poland in 2012. A heated discussion that ensued after its publication shows that this book was much needed".

== See also ==
- German–Polish Non-Aggression Pact
- Fatherland (novel)
- Axis victory in World War II
- Pax Germanica
- Molotov–Ribbentrop Pact
- Operation Barbarossa
- The War That Came Early, an alternate history novel series which also depicts Poland allying with Nazi Germany during World War II.
