= Stanisław August Poniatowski =

Ruler of Poland–Lithuania from 1764 to 1795

Stanisław II August
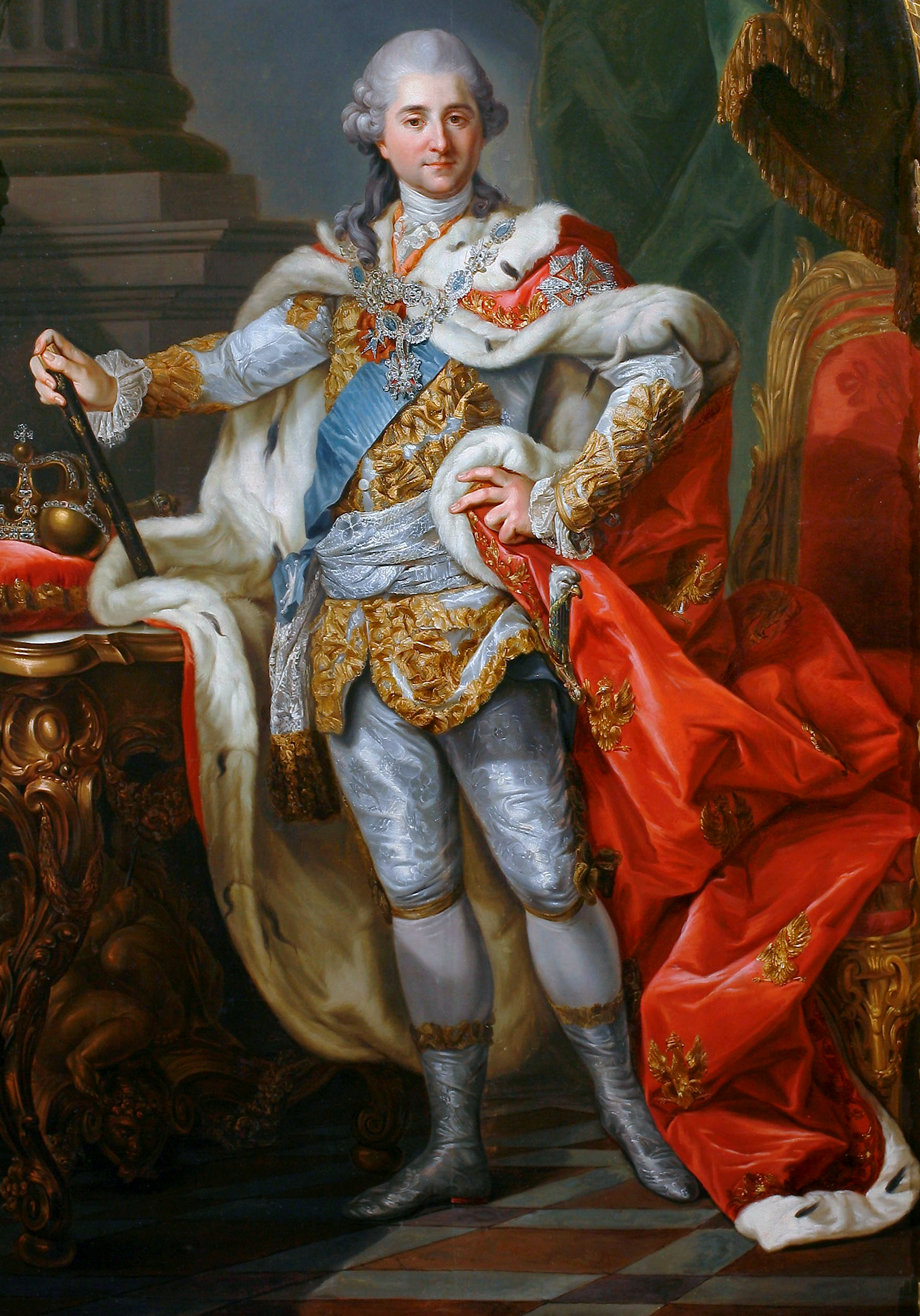
- Stanisław August in coronation robes, 1764

King of Poland Grand Duke of Lithuania
- Reign: 7 September 1764 – 25 November 1795
- Coronation: 25 November 1764; St. John's Archcathedral, Warsaw
- Predecessor: Augustus III
- Successor: Monarchy abolished
- Born: 17 January 1732; Wołczyn, Polish–Lithuanian Commonwealth
- Died: 12 February 1798 (aged 66); Saint Petersburg, Russian Empire
- Burial: St. John's Archcathedral, Warsaw
- Spouse: Elżbieta Szydłowska (morganatic; allegedly)
- Issue Details [...]: illegitimate
Names
- Stanisław Antoni Poniatowski
- House: Poniatowski
- Father: Stanisław Poniatowski
- Mother: Konstancja Czartoryska
- Religion: Roman Catholicism

Stanisław II August (Note: Polish pronunciation: [staˈɲi.swaf dru.ɡi ˈau.ɡust]) (born Stanisław Antoni Poniatowski; (Note: Polish: [staˈɲiswaf anˈtɔɲi pɔɲaˈtɔfskʲi]) 17 January 1732 – 12 February 1798), known also by his regnal Latin name Stanislaus II Augustus, and as Stanisław August Poniatowski (Lithuanian: Stanislovas Augustas Poniatovskis), was King of Poland and Grand Duke of Lithuania from 1764 to 1795, and the last monarch of the Polish–Lithuanian Commonwealth.

Born into wealthy Polish aristocracy, Poniatowski arrived as a diplomat at the Russian imperial court in Saint Petersburg in 1755 at the age of 22 and became intimately involved with the future empress Catherine the Great. With her aid, he was elected King of Poland and Grand Duke of Lithuania by the Sejm in September 1764 following the death of Augustus III. Contrary to expectations, Poniatowski attempted to reform and strengthen the large but ailing Commonwealth. His efforts were met with external opposition from neighbouring Prussia, Russia and Austria, all committed to keeping the Commonwealth weak. From within, he was opposed by conservative interests, which saw the reforms as a threat to their traditional liberties and privileges granted centuries earlier.

The defining crisis of his early reign was the War of the Bar Confederation (1768–1772) that led to the First Partition of Poland (1772). The latter part of his reign saw reforms wrought by the Diet (1788–1792) and the Constitution of 3 May 1791. These reforms were overthrown by the 1792 Targowica Confederation and by the Polish–Russian War of 1792, leading directly to the Second Partition of Poland (1793), the Kościuszko Uprising (1794) and the final and Third Partition of Poland (1795), marking the end of the Commonwealth. Stripped of all meaningful power, Poniatowski abdicated in November 1795 and spent the last years of his life as a captive in Saint Petersburg's Marble Palace.

A controversial figure in Poland's history, he is viewed with ambivalence as a brave and skillful statesman by some and as an overly hesitant coward by others, and even as a traitor. He is criticized primarily for his failure to resolutely stand against opposing forces and prevent the partitions, which led to the destruction of the Polish state. On the other hand, he is remembered as a great patron of arts and sciences who laid the foundation for the Commission of National Education, the first institution of its kind in the world, the Great Sejm of 1788–1792, which led to the Constitution of 3 May 1791 and as a sponsor of many architectural landmarks. Historians tend to agree that, taking the circumstances into account, he was a skillful statesman, pointing out that passing the Constitution was a sign of bravery, although his unwillingness to organize a proper nationwide uprising afterward is seen as cowardice and the key reason for the Second Partition and the subsequent downfall of Poland.

== Youth ==
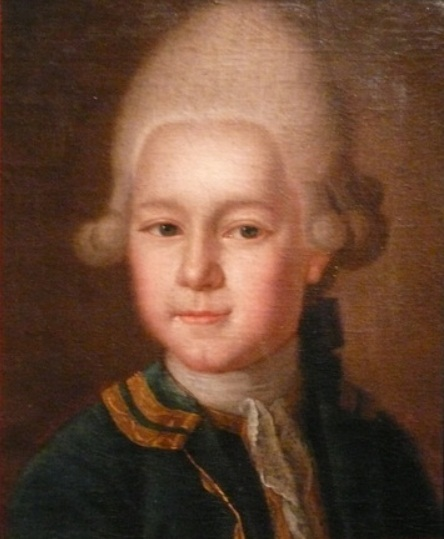
Aged 14

Stanisław Antoni Poniatowski was born on 17 January 1732 in Wołczyn (then in the Polish–Lithuanian Commonwealth and now Vowchyn, Belarus). He was one of eight surviving children, and the fourth son, of Princess Konstancja Czartoryska and of Count Stanisław Poniatowski, Ciołek coat of arms, Castellan of Kraków. His older brothers were Kazimierz Poniatowski (1721–1800), a Podkomorzy at Court, Franciszek Poniatowski (1723–1749), Canon of Wawel Cathedral who suffered from epilepsy and Aleksander Poniatowski (1725–1744), an officer killed in the Rhineland-Palatinate during the War of the Austrian Succession. His younger brothers were, Andrzej Poniatowski (1734–1773), an Austrian Feldmarschall, Michał Jerzy Poniatowski (1736–1794) who became Primate of Poland. His two older and married sisters were Ludwika Zamoyska (1728–1804) and Izabella Branicka (1730–1808). Among his nephews was Prince Józef Poniatowski (1763–1813), son of Andrzej. He was a great-grandson of poet and courtier Jan Andrzej Morsztyn and of Lady Catherine Gordon, lady-in-waiting to Queen Marie Louise Gonzaga; thus descended from the Marquesses of Huntly and the Scottish nobility. The Poniatowski family had achieved high status among the Polish nobility (szlachta) of the time.

He spent the first few years of his childhood in Gdańsk. He was temporarily kidnapped as a toddler, on the orders of Józef Potocki, Governor of Kiev, as a reprisal for his father's support for King Augustus III and held for some months in Kamieniec-Podolski. He was returned to his parents in Gdańsk. Later, he moved with his family to Warsaw. He was initially educated by his mother, then by private tutors, including Russian ambassador Herman Karl von Keyserling. He had few friends in his teenage years and instead developed a fondness for books, which continued throughout his life. He went on his first foreign trip in 1748, with elements of the Imperial Russian army as it advanced into the Rhineland to aid Maria Theresia's troops during the War of the Austrian Succession which ended with the Treaty of Aix-la-Chapelle (1748). This enabled Poniatowski both to visit the city, also known as Aachen, and to venture into the Netherlands. On his return journey he stopped in Dresden.

== Political career ==
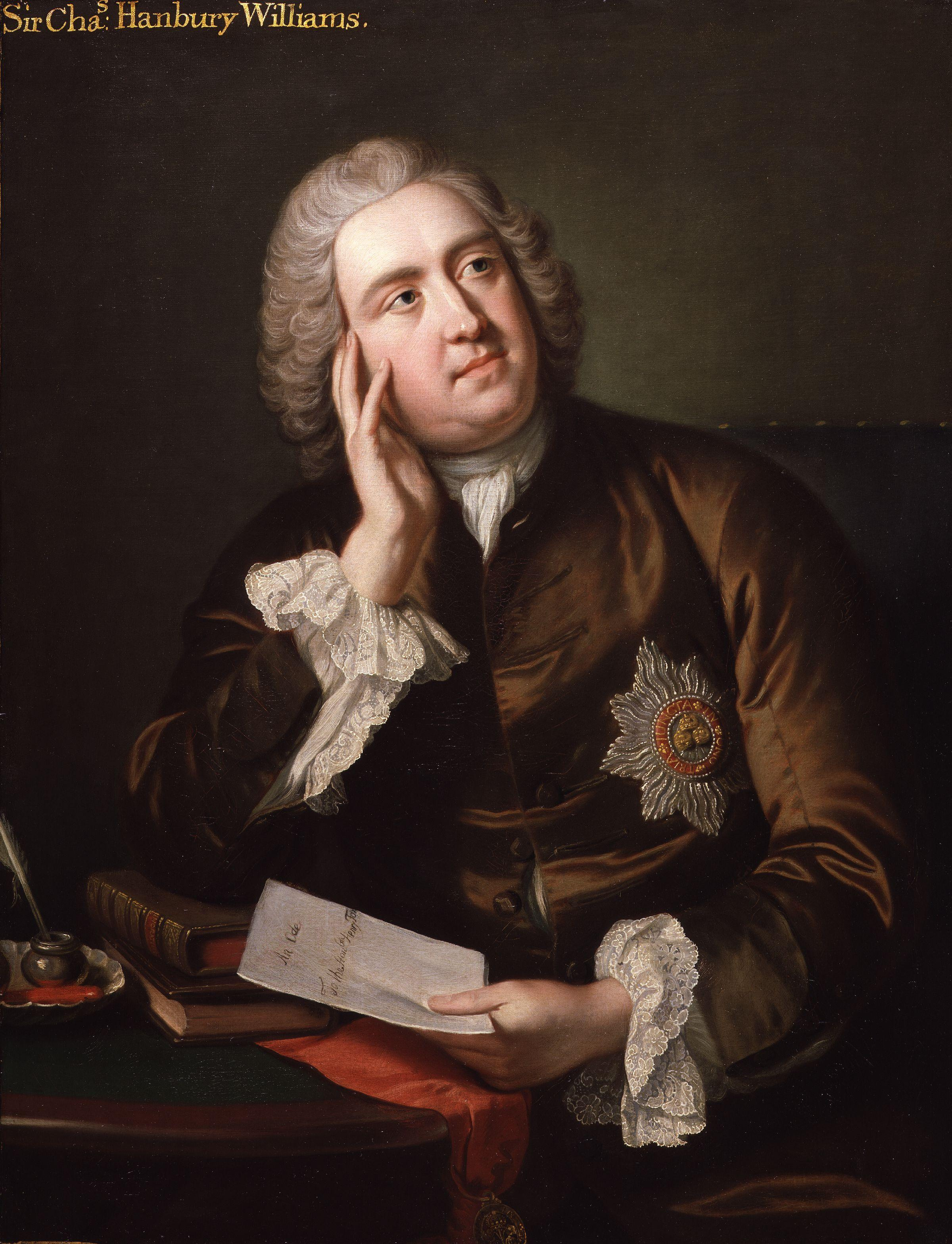
Sir Charles Hanbury Williams, Poniatowski's mentor, by John Giles Eccardt

The following year Poniatowski was apprenticed to the office of Michał Fryderyk Czartoryski, the then Deputy Chancellor of Lithuania. In 1750, he travelled to Berlin where he met a British diplomat, Charles Hanbury Williams, who became his mentor and friend. In 1751, Poniatowski was elected to the Treasury Tribunal in Radom, where he served as a commissioner. He spent most of January 1752 at the Austrian court in Vienna. Later that year, after serving at the Radom Tribunal and meeting King Augustus III of Poland, he was elected deputy of the Sejm (Polish parliament). While there, his father secured for him the title of Starosta of Przemyśl. In March 1753, he travelled to Hungary and Vienna, where he again met with Williams. He returned to the Netherlands, where he met many key members of that country's political and economic sphere. By late August, he had arrived in Paris, where he moved among the elites. In February 1754, he travelled on to Britain, where he spent some months. There, he was befriended by Charles Yorke, the future Lord Chancellor of Great Britain. He returned to the Commonwealth later that year, however he eschewed the Sejm, as his parents wanted to keep him out of the political furore surrounding the Ostrogski family's land inheritance (see: fee tail – Ordynacja Ostrogska). The following year he received the title of Stolnik of Lithuania.

Poniatowski owed his rise and influence to his family connections with the powerful Czartoryski family and their political faction, known as the Familia, with whom he had grown close. It was the Familia who sent him in 1755 to Saint Petersburg in the service of Williams, who had been nominated British ambassador to Russia.

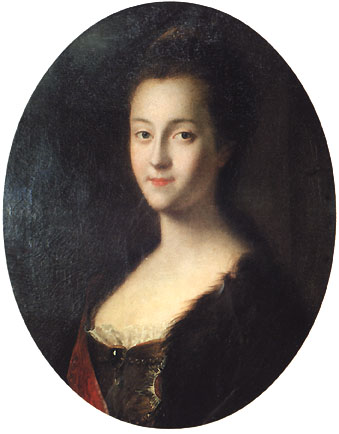
Grand Duchess Catherine Alexeyevna, 1745, by Louis Caravaque

In Saint Petersburg, Williams introduced Poniatowski to the 26-year-old Catherine Alexeievna, the future empress Catherine the Great. The two became lovers. Whatever his feelings for Catherine, it is likely Poniatowski also saw an opportunity to use the relationship for his own benefit, using her influence to bolster his career.

Poniatowski had to leave St. Petersburg in July 1756 due to court intrigue. Through the combined influence of Catherine, of Russian empress Elizabeth and of chancellor Bestuzhev-Ryumin, Poniatowski was able to rejoin the Russian court now as ambassador of Saxony the following January. Still in St Petersburg, he appears to have been a source of intrigue between various European governments, some supporting his appointment, others demanding his withdrawal. He eventually left the Russian capital on 14 August 1758.

Poniatowski attended the Sejms of 1758, 1760, and 1762. He continued his involvement with the Familia, and supported a pro-Russian and anti-Prussian stance in Polish politics. His father died in 1762, leaving him a modest inheritance. In 1762, when Catherine ascended the Russian throne, she sent him several letters professing her support for his own ascension to the Polish throne, but asking him to stay away from St. Petersburg. Nevertheless, Poniatowski hoped that Catherine would consider his offer of marriage, an idea seen as plausible by some international observers. He participated in the failed plot by the Familia to stage a coup d'état against King Augustus III. In August 1763, however, Catherine advised him and the Familia that she would not support a coup as long as King Augustus was alive.

== Kingship ==
=== Years of hope ===
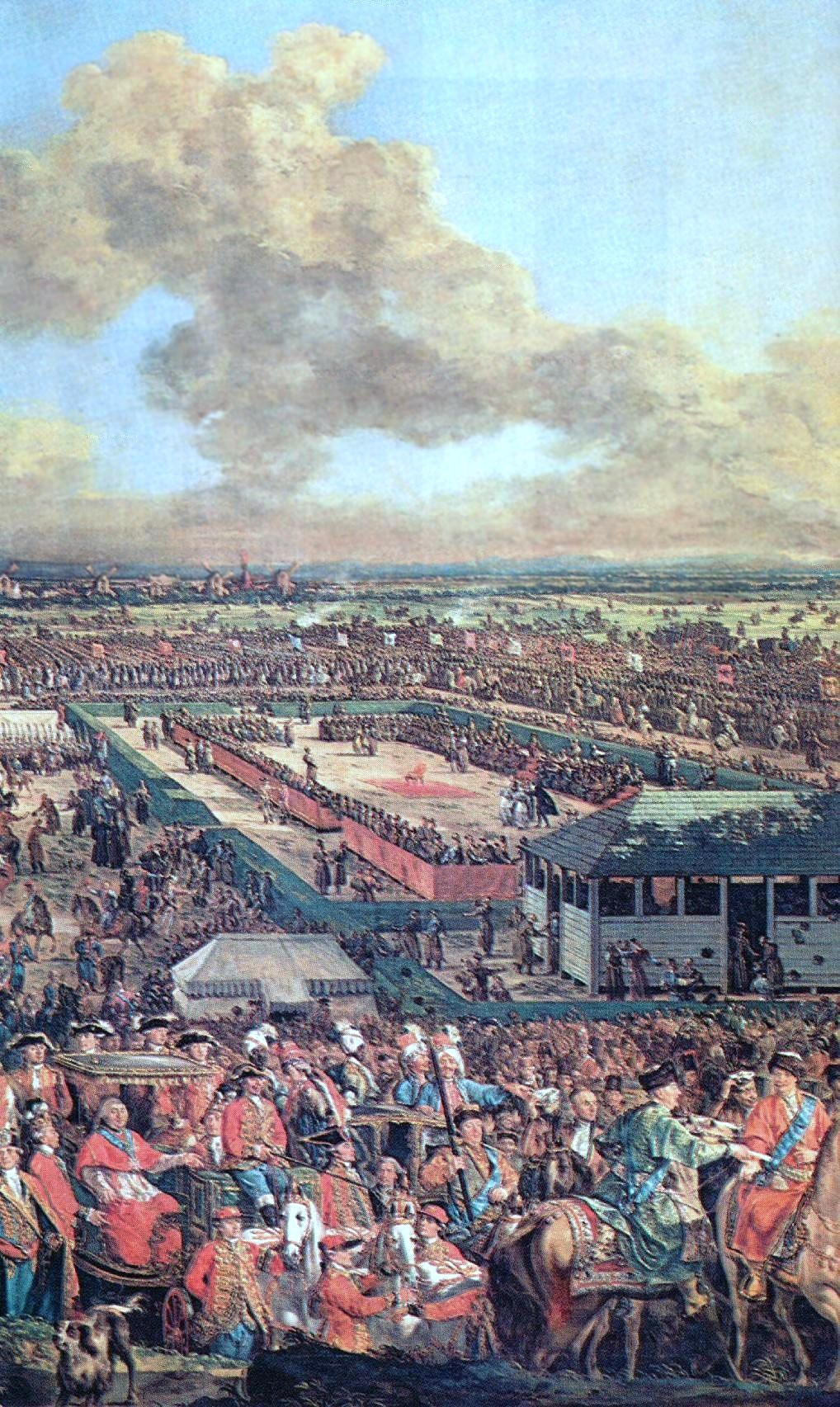
Stanisław August's 1764 election as king, depicted by Bernardo Bellotto

Upon the death of Poland's King Augustus III in October 1763, lobbying began for the election of the new king. Catherine threw her support behind Poniatowski. The Russians spent about 2.5 million rubles in aid of his election. Poniatowski's supporters and opponents engaged in some military posturing and even minor clashes. In the end, the Russian army was deployed only a few kilometres from the election sejm, which met at Wola near Warsaw. In the event, there were no other serious contenders, and during the convocation sejm on 7 September 1764, 32-year-old Poniatowski was elected king, with 5,584 votes. He swore the pacta conventa on 13 November, and a formal coronation took place in Warsaw on 25 November. The new king's "uncles" in the Familia would have preferred another nephew on the throne, Prince Adam Kazimierz Czartoryski, characterized by one of his contemporaries as "débauché, si non dévoyé" (French: "debauched if not depraved"), but Czartoryski had declined to seek office.

"Stanisław August", as he now styled himself, combining the names of his two immediate royal predecessors, began his rule with only mixed support within the nation. It was mainly the small nobility who favoured his election. In his first years on the throne, he attempted to introduce a number of reforms. He founded the Knights School, and began to form a diplomatic service, with semi-permanent diplomatic representatives throughout Europe, Russia and the Ottoman Empire. On 7 May 1765, Poniatowski established the Order of the Knights of Saint Stanislaus, in honour of Saint Stanislaus of Krakow, Bishop and Martyr, Poland's and his own patron saint, as the country's second order of chivalry, to reward Poles and others for noteworthy service to the King. Together with the Familia he tried to reform the ineffective system of government, by reducing the powers of the hetmans (Commonwealth's top military commanders) and treasurers, moving them to commissions elected by the Sejm and accountable to the King. In his memoirs, Poniatowski called this period the "years of hope". The Familia, which was interested in strengthening its own power base, was dissatisfied with his conciliatory attitude as he reached out to many former opponents of their policies. This uneasy alliance between Poniatowski and the Familia continued for most of the first decade of his rule. One of the points of contention between Poniatowski and the Familia concerned the rights of religious minorities in Poland. Whereas Poniatowski reluctantly supported a policy of religious tolerance, the Familia was opposed to it. The growing rift between Poniatowski and the Familia was exploited by the Russians, who used the issue as a pretext to intervene in the Commonwealth's internal politics and to destabilize the country. Catherine had no wish to see Poniatowski's reform succeed. She had supported his ascent to the throne to ensure the Commonwealth remained a virtual puppet state under Russian control, so his attempts to reform the Commonwealth's ailing government structures were a threat to the status quo.

=== The Bar Confederation and First Partition of Poland ===
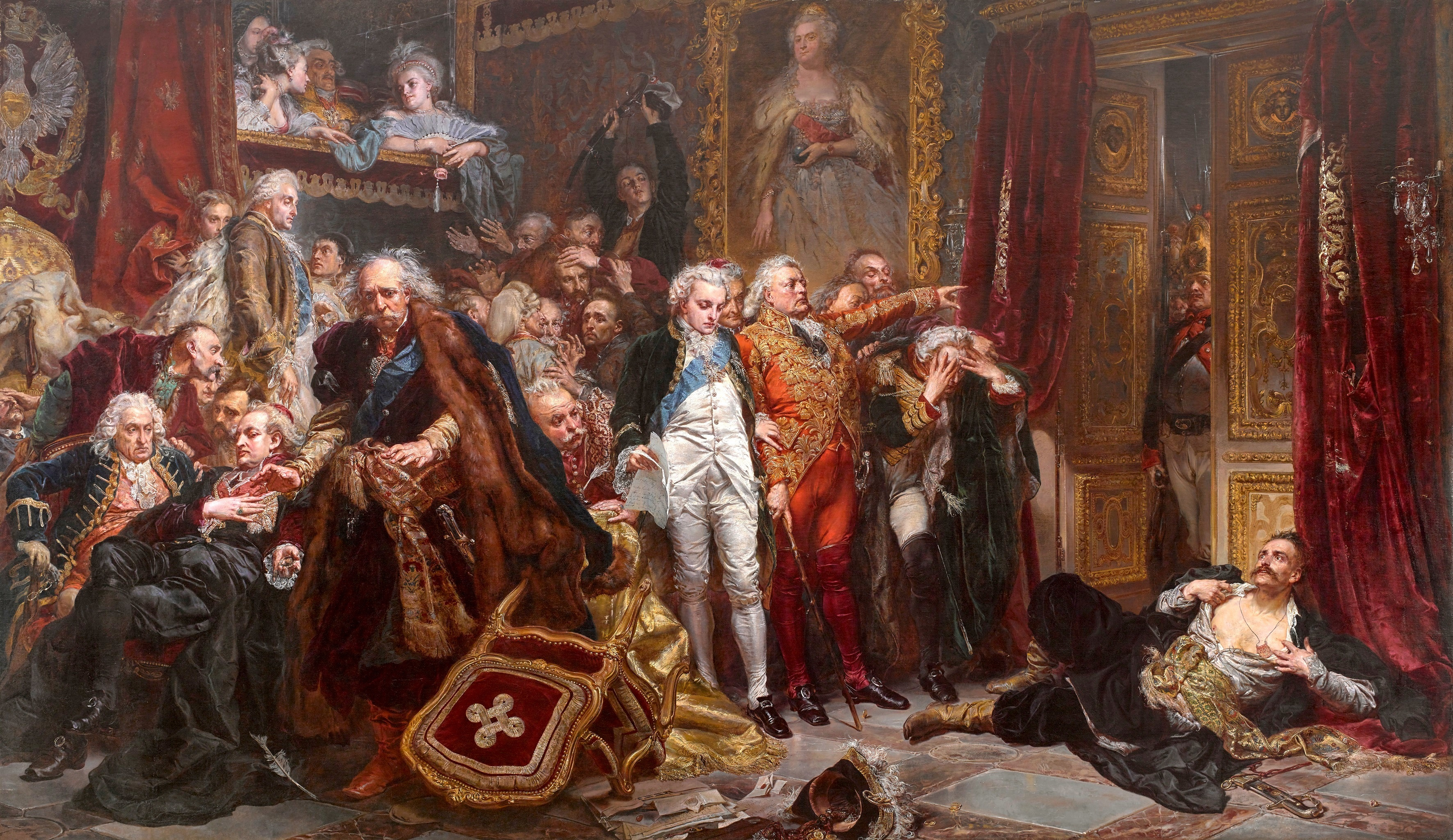
Tadeusz Rejtan's famous gesture of protest at the Partition Sejm, as depicted by Matejko

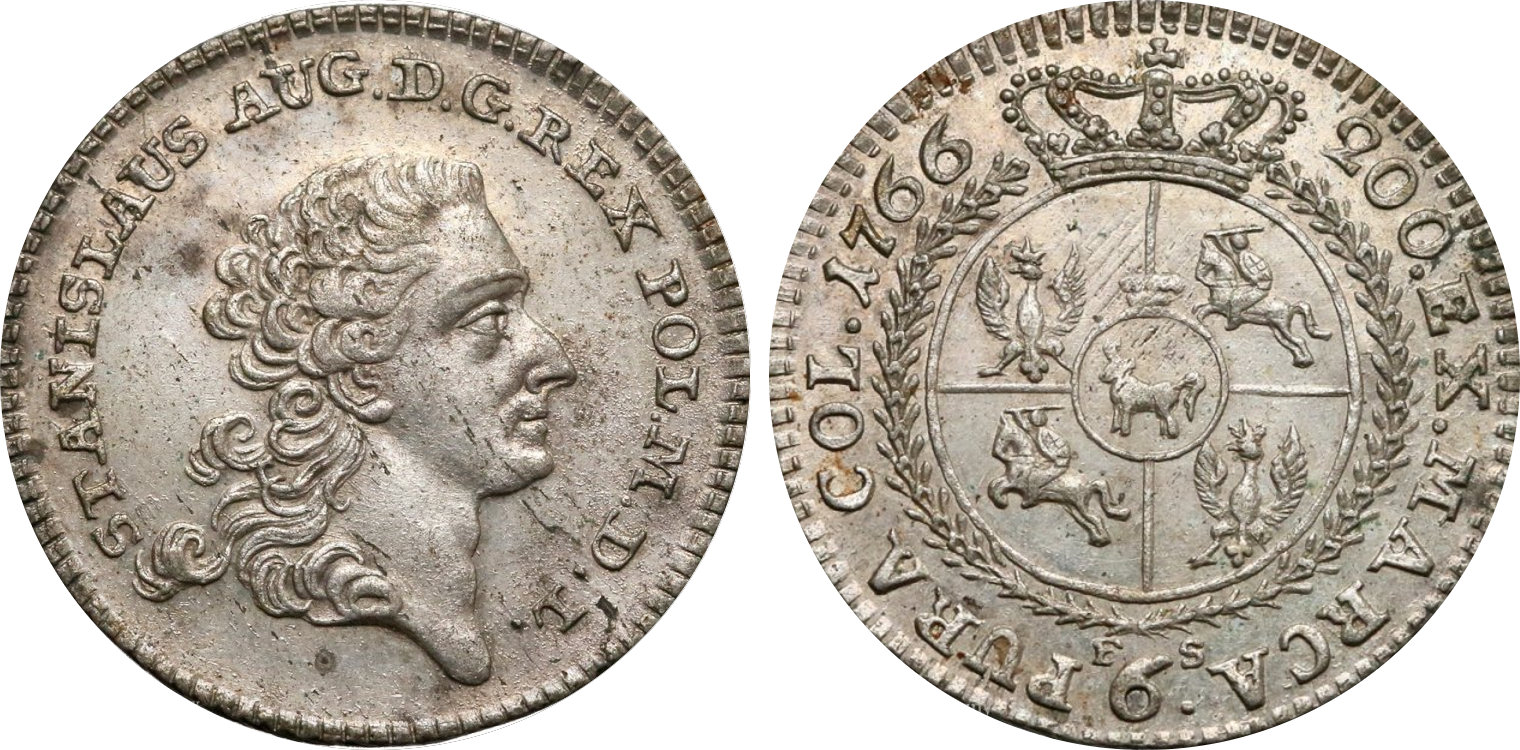
Polish coin bearing the coat of arms of King Stanisław II August, c. 1766

Matters came to a head in 1766. During the Sejm in October of that year, Poniatowski attempted to push through a radical reform, restricting the disastrous liberum veto provision. He was opposed by conservatives such as Michał Wielhorski, who were supported by the Prussian and Russian ambassadors and who threatened war if the reform was passed. The dissidents, supported by the Russians, formed the Radom Confederation. Abandoned by the Familia, Poniatowski's reforms failed to pass at the Repnin Sejm, named after Russian ambassador Nicholas Repnin, who promised to guarantee with all the might of the Russian Empire the Golden Liberties of the Polish nobility, enshrined in the Cardinal Laws.

Although it had abandoned the cause of Poniatowski's reforms, the Familia did not receive the support it expected from the Russians, who continued to press for the conservatives' rights. Meanwhile, other factions now rallied under the banner of the Bar Confederation, aimed against the conservatives, Poniatowski and the Russians. After an unsuccessful attempt to raise allies in Western Europe, France, Britain and Austria, Poniatowski and the Familia had no choice but to rely more heavily on the Russian Empire, which treated Poland as a protectorate. In the War of the Bar Confederation (1768–1772), Poniatowski supported the Russian army's repression of the Bar Confederation. In 1770, the Council of the Bar Confederation proclaimed him dethroned. The following year, he was kidnapped by Bar Confederates and was briefly held prisoner outside of Warsaw, but he managed to escape. In view of the continuing weakness of the Polish-Lithuanian state, Austria, Russia, and Prussia collaborated to threaten military intervention in exchange for substantial territorial concessions from the Commonwealth – a decision they made without consulting Poniatowski or any other Polish parties.

Although Poniatowski protested against the First Partition of the Commonwealth (1772), he was powerless to do anything about it. He considered abdication, but decided against it.

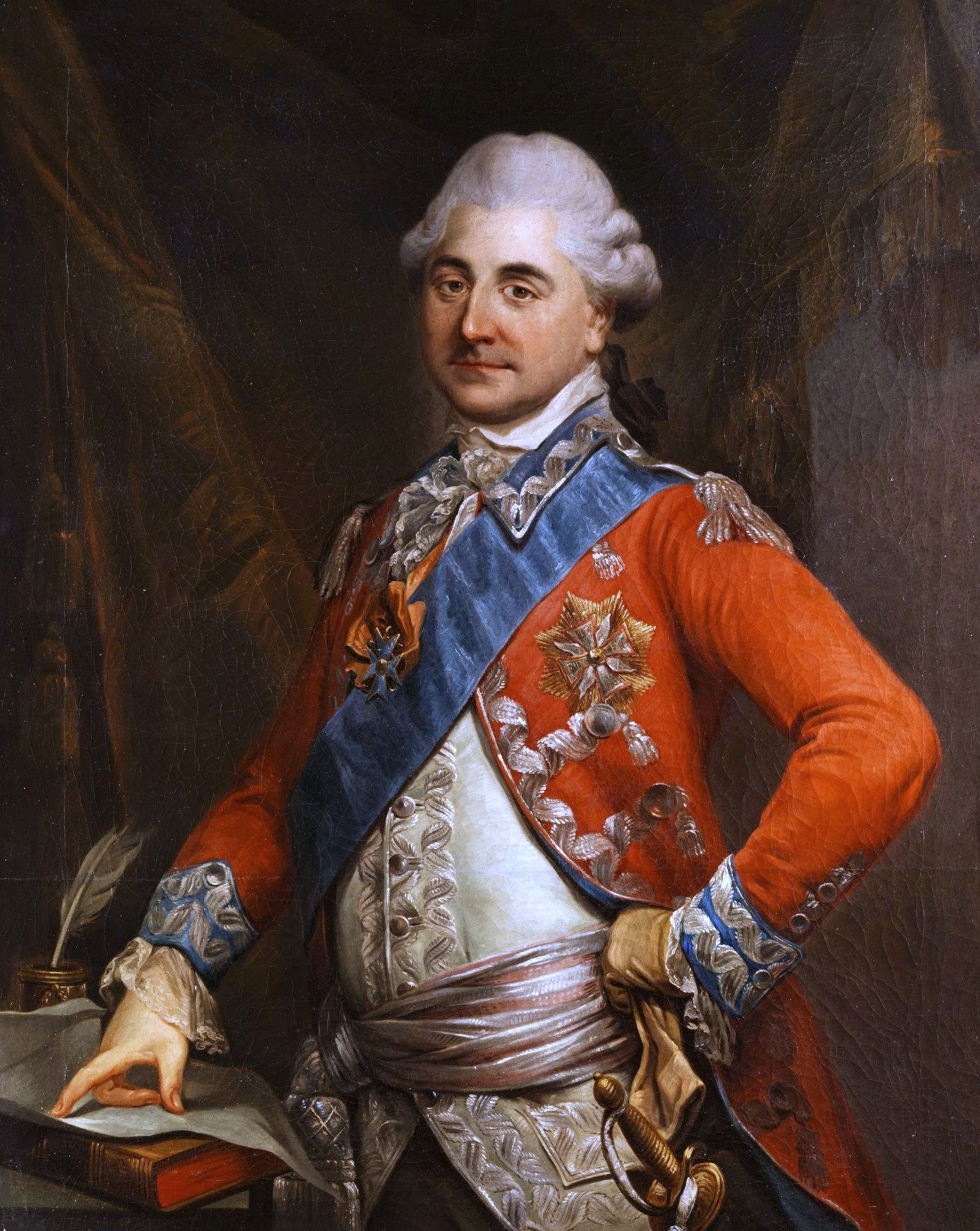
Portrait by Marcello Bacciarelli, 1786

During the Partition Sejm of 1773–1775, in which Russia was represented by ambassador Otto von Stackelberg, with no allied assistance forthcoming from abroad and with the armies of the partitioning powers occupying Warsaw to compel the Sejm by force of arms, no alternative was available save submission to their will. Eventually, Poniatowski and the Sejm acceded to the "partition treaty". At the same time, several other reforms were passed. The Cardinal Laws were confirmed and guaranteed by the partitioning powers. Royal prerogative was restricted, so that the King lost the power to confer titular roles and military promotions, to appoint ministers and senators. Starostwo territories, and Crown lands would be awarded by auction. The Sejm also created two notable institutions: the Permanent Council, a government body in continuous operation, and the Commission of National Education. The partitioning powers intended the council to be easier to control than the unruly Sejms, and indeed it remained under the influence of the Russian Empire. Nevertheless, it was a significant improvement on the earlier Commonwealth governance. The new legislation was guaranteed by the Russian Empire, giving it licence to interfere in Commonwealth politics when legislation it favoured was threatened.

The aftermath of the Partition Sejm saw the rise of a conservative faction opposed to the Permanent Council, seeing it as a threat to their Golden Freedoms. This faction was supported by the Czartoryski family, but not by Poniatowski, who proved to be quite adept at making the Council follow his wishes. This marked the formation of new anti-royal and pro-royal factions in Polish politics. The royal faction was made up primarily of people indebted to the King, who planned to build their careers on service to him. Few were privy to his plans for reforms, which were kept hidden from the conservative opposition and Russia. Poniatowski scored a political victory during the Sejm of 1776, which further strengthened the council. Chancellor Andrzej Zamoyski was tasked with the codification of the Polish law, a project that became known as the Zamoyski Code. Russia supported some, but not all, of the 1776 reforms, and to prevent Poniatowski from growing too powerful, it supported the opposition during the Sejm of 1778. This marked the end of Poniatowski's reforms, as he found himself without sufficient support to carry them through.

=== The Great Sejm and the Constitution of 3 May 1791 ===
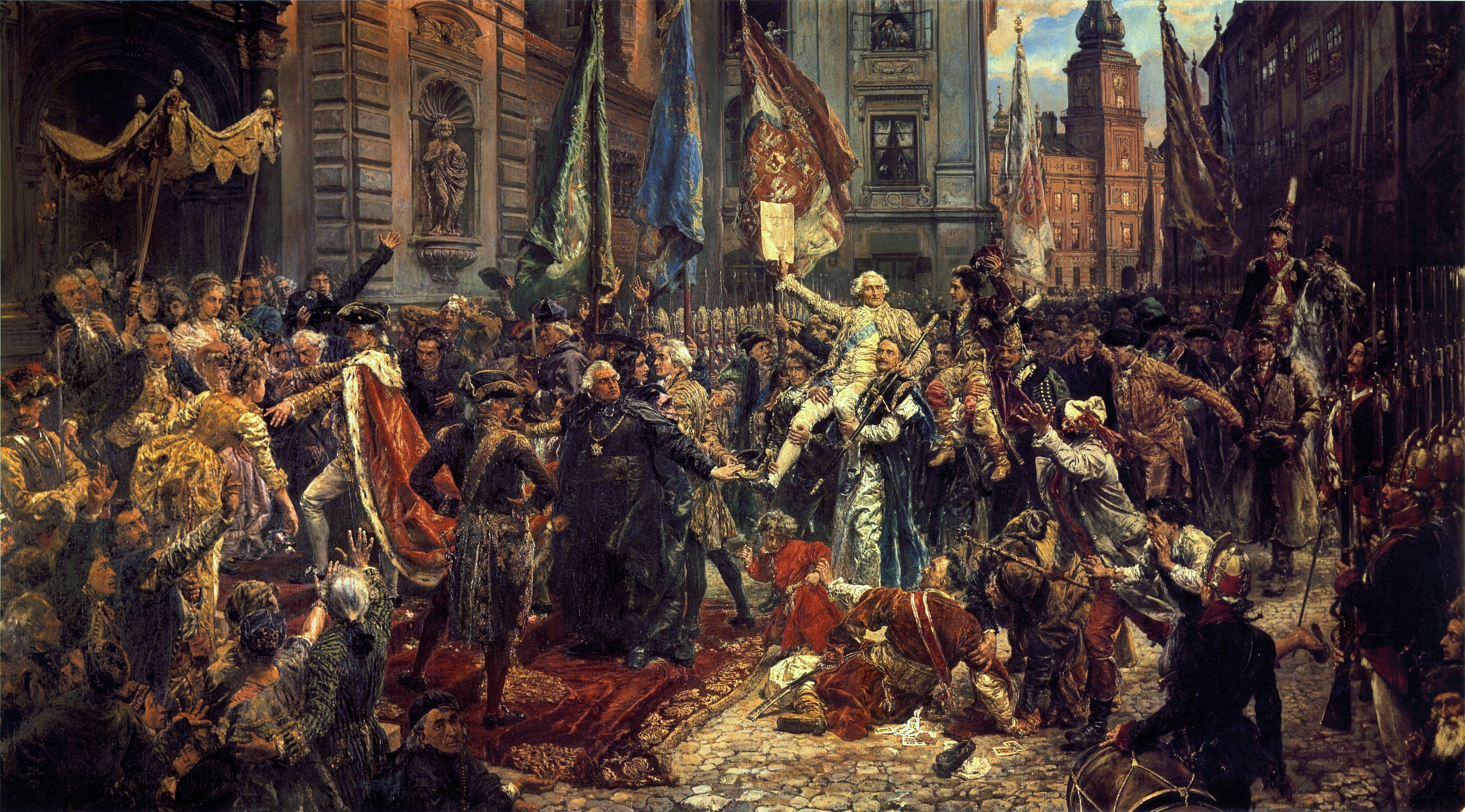
Constitution of 3 May 1791, by Jan Matejko, 1891

In the 1780s, Catherine appeared to favour Poniatowski marginally over the opposition, but she did not support any of his plans for significant reform. Despite repeated attempts, Poniatowski failed to confederate the sejms, which would have made them immune to the liberum veto. Thus, although he had a majority in the Sejms, Poniatowski was unable to pass even the smallest reform. The Zamoyski Code was rejected by the Sejm of 1780, and opposition attacks on the King dominated the Sejms of 1782 and 1786.

Reforms became possible again in the late 1780s. In the context of the wars being waged against the Ottoman Empire by both the Austrian Empire and the Russian Empire, Poniatowski tried to draw Poland into the Austro-Russian alliance, seeing a war with the Ottomans as an opportunity to strengthen the Commonwealth. Catherine gave permission for the next Sejm to be called, as she considered some form of limited military alliance with Poland against the Ottomans might be useful.

The Polish-Russian alliance was not implemented, as in the end, the only acceptable compromise proved unattractive to both sides. However, in the ensuing Four-Year Sejm of 1788–1792 (known as the Great Sejm), Poniatowski threw his lot in with the reformers associated with the Patriotic Party of Stanisław Małachowski, Ignacy Potocki and Hugo Kołłątaj, and co-authored the Constitution of 3 May 1791. The Constitution introduced sweeping reforms. According to Jacek Jędruch, the Constitution, despite its liberal provisions, "fell somewhere below the French, above the Canadian, and left the General State Laws for the Prussian States (in German: Allgemeines Landrecht für die Preußischen Staaten) far behind", but was "no match for the American Constitution".

George Sanford notes that the Constitution gave Poland "a constitutional monarchy close to the British model of the time." According to a contemporary account, Poniatowski himself described it as "founded principally on those of England and the United States of America, but avoiding the faults and errors of both, and adapted as much as possible to the local and particular circumstances of the country." The Constitution of 3 May remained, to the end, a work in progress. A new civil and criminal code (provisionally called the "Stanisław Augustus Code") was among the proposals. Poniatowski also planned a reform to improve the situation of Polish Jews.

In foreign policy, spurned by Russia, Poland turned to another potential ally, the Triple Alliance, represented on the Polish diplomatic scene primarily by the Kingdom of Prussia, which led to the formation of the ultimately futile Polish–Prussian alliance. The pro-Prussian shift was not supported by Poniatowski, who nevertheless acceded to the decision of the majority of Sejm deputies. The passing of the Constitution of 3 May, although officially applauded by Frederick William II of Prussia, who sent a congratulatory note to Warsaw, caused further worry in Prussia. The contacts of Polish reformers with the revolutionary French National Assembly were seen by Poland's neighbours as evidence of a conspiracy and a threat to their absolute monarchies. Prussian statesman Ewald von Hertzberg expressed the fears of European conservatives: "The Poles have given the coup de grâce to the Prussian monarchy by voting in a constitution", elaborating that a strong Commonwealth would likely demand the return of the lands Prussia acquired in the First Partition; a similar sentiment was later expressed by Prussian Foreign Minister, Count Friedrich Wilhelm von der Schulenburg-Kehnert. Russia's wars with the Ottomans and Sweden having ended, Catherine was furious over the adoption of the Constitution, which threatened Russian influence in Poland. One of Russia's chief foreign policy authors, Alexander Bezborodko, upon learning of the Constitution, commented that "the worst possible news have arrived from Warsaw: the Polish king has become almost sovereign."

=== War in Defence of the Constitution and Fall of the Commonwealth ===
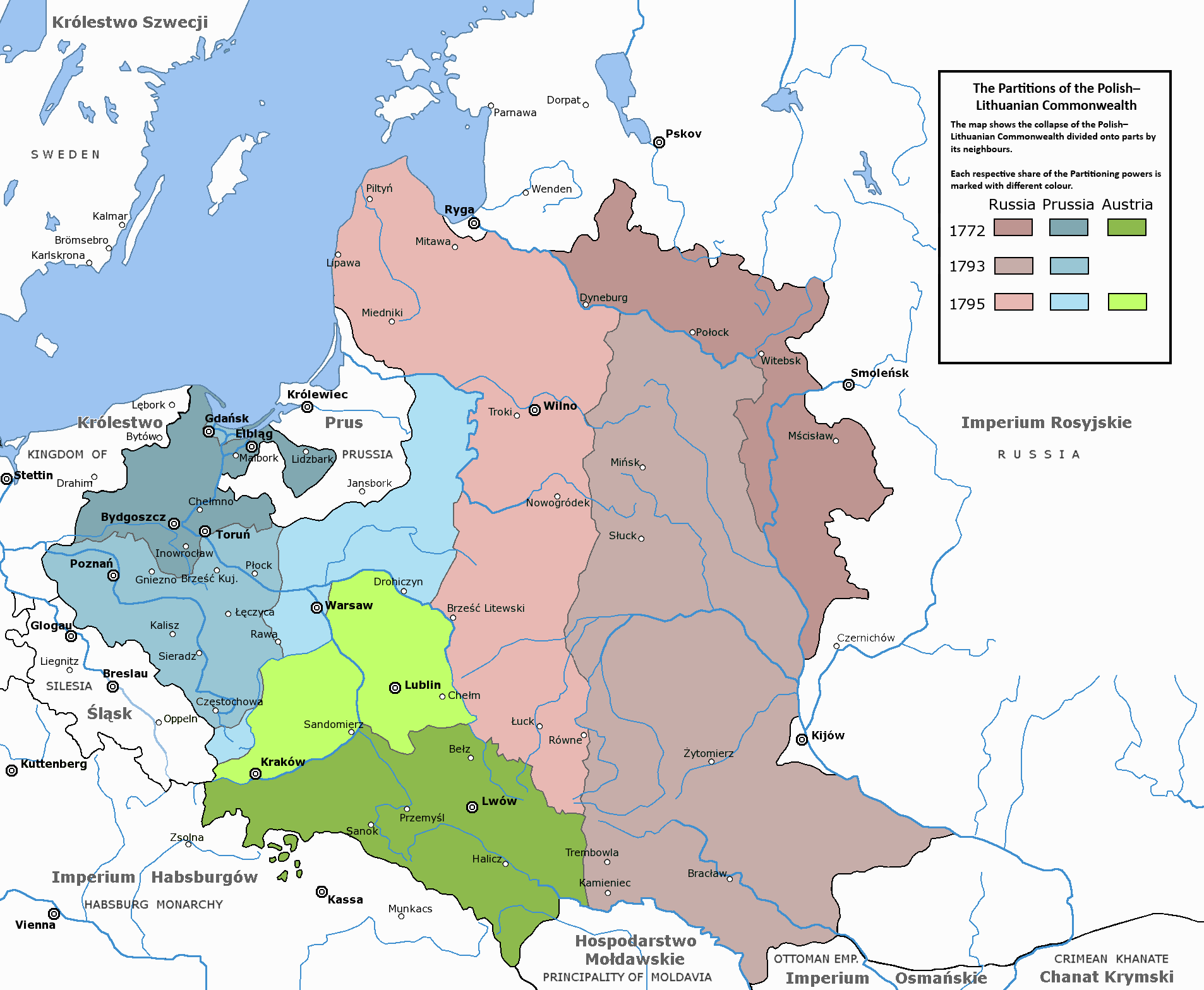
The three Partitions of Poland-Lithuania: Russian (purple and red), Austrian (green), Prussian (blue)

Shortly thereafter, conservative Polish nobility formed the Targowica Confederation to overthrow the Constitution, which they saw as a threat to the traditional freedoms and privileges they enjoyed. The confederates aligned themselves with Russia's Catherine the Great, and the Russian army entered Poland, marking the start of the Polish–Russian War of 1792, also known as the War in Defence of the Constitution. The Sejm voted to increase the Polish Army to 100,000 men, but due to insufficient time and funds, this number was never achieved. Poniatowski and the reformers could field only a 37,000 man army, many of them untested recruits. This army, under the command of the King's nephew Józef Poniatowski and Tadeusz Kościuszko, managed to defeat the Russians or fight them to a draw on several occasions. Following the victorious Battle of Zieleńce, in which Polish forces were commanded by his nephew, the King founded a new order, the Order of Virtuti Militari, to reward Poles for exceptional military leadership and courage in combat.

Despite Polish requests, Prussia refused to honour its alliance obligations. In the end, the numerical superiority of the Russians was too great, and defeat looked inevitable. Poniatowski's attempts at negotiations with Russia proved futile. In July 1792, when Warsaw was threatened with siege by the Russians, the king came to believe that surrender was the only alternative to total defeat. Having received assurances from Russian ambassador Yakov Bulgakov that no territorial changes would occur, the cabinet of ministers called the Guard of Laws (or Guardians of Law, Polish: Straż Praw) voted eight to four in favor of surrender. On 24 July 1792, Poniatowski joined the Targowica Confederation. The Polish Army disintegrated. Many reform leaders, believing their cause lost, went into self-exile, although they hoped that Poniatowski would be able to negotiate an acceptable compromise with the Russians, as he had done in the past. Poniatowski had not saved the Commonwealth, however. He and the reformers had lost much of their influence, both within the country and with Catherine. Neither were the Targowica Confederates victorious. To their surprise, there ensued the Second Partition of Poland. With the new deputies bribed or intimidated by the Russian troops, the Grodno Sejm took place. On 23 November 1793, it annulled all acts of the Great Sejm, including the Constitution. Faced with his powerlessness, Poniatowski once again considered abdication; in the meantime, he tried to salvage whatever reforms he could.

== Final years ==
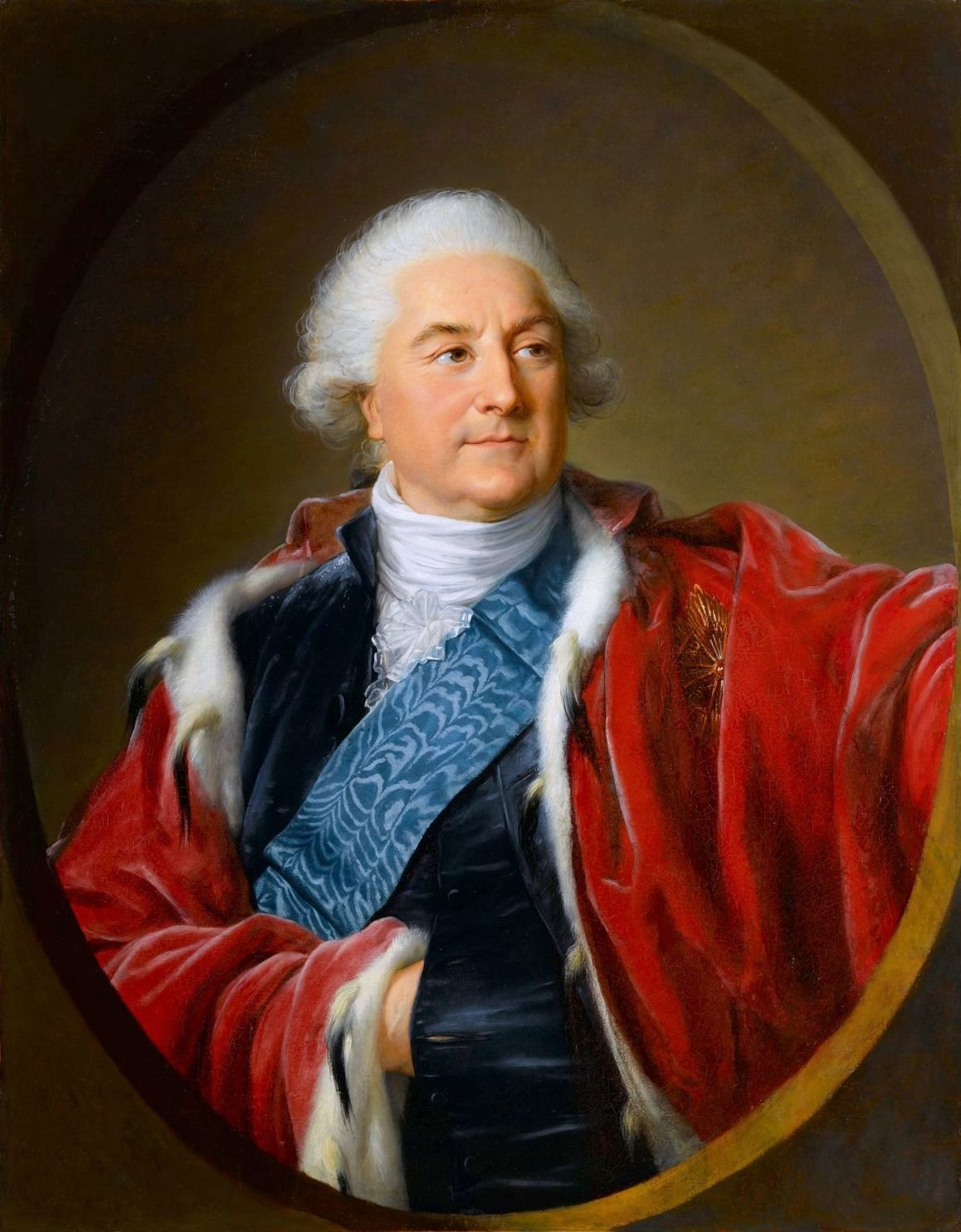
Portrait by Élisabeth-Louise Vigée-Le Brun, 1797

Poniatowski's plans had been ruined by the Kościuszko Uprising. The King had not encouraged it, but once it began, he supported it, seeing no other honourable option. Its defeat marked the end of the Commonwealth. Poniatowski tried to govern the country in the brief period after the fall of the Uprising, but on 2 December 1794, Catherine demanded he leave Warsaw, a request to which he acceded on 7 January 1795, leaving the capital under Russian military escort and settling briefly in Grodno. On 24 October 1795, the Act of the final, Third Partition of Poland was signed. One month and one day later, on 25 November, Poniatowski signed his abdication.

Reportedly, his sister, Ludwika Maria Zamoyska, and her daughter, also his favourite niece, Urszula Zamoyska, who had been threatened with confiscation of their property, had contributed to persuading him to sign the abdication: they feared that his refusal would lead to a Russian confiscation of their properties and their ruin.

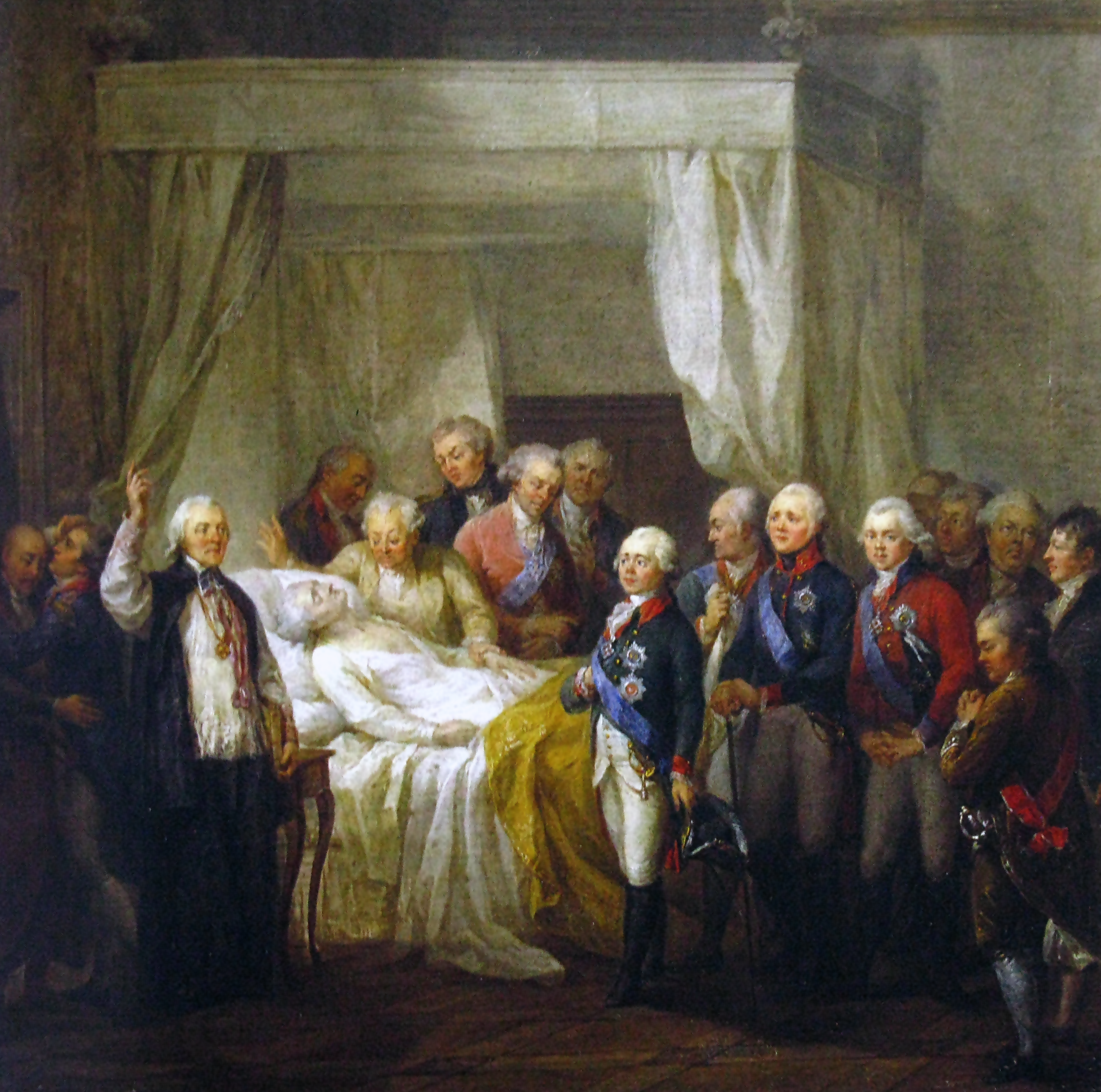
Poniatowski on his deathbed, 1798, by Marcello Bacciarelli

Catherine died on 17 November 1796, succeeded by her son, Paul I of Russia. On 15 February 1797, Poniatowski left for Saint Petersburg. He had hoped to be allowed to travel abroad, but was unable to secure permission to do so. A virtual prisoner in St. Petersburg's Marble Palace, he subsisted on a pension granted to him by Catherine. Despite financial troubles, he still supported some of his former allies, and continued to try to represent the Polish cause at the Russian court. He also worked on his memoirs.

Poniatowski died of a stroke on 12 February 1798. Paul I sponsored a royal state funeral, and on 3 March he was buried at the Catholic Church of St. Catherine in St. Petersburg. In 1938, when the Soviet Union planned to demolish the Church, his remains were transferred to the Second Polish Republic and interred in a church at Wołczyn, his birthplace. This was done in secret and caused controversy in Poland when the matter became known. In 1990, due to the poor state of the Wołczyn church (then in the Byelorussian SSR), his body was once more exhumed and was brought to Poland, to St. John's Cathedral in Warsaw, where on 3 May 1791 he had celebrated the adoption of the Constitution that he had coauthored. A third funeral ceremony was held on 14 February 1995.

== Legacy ==
=== Patron of culture ===
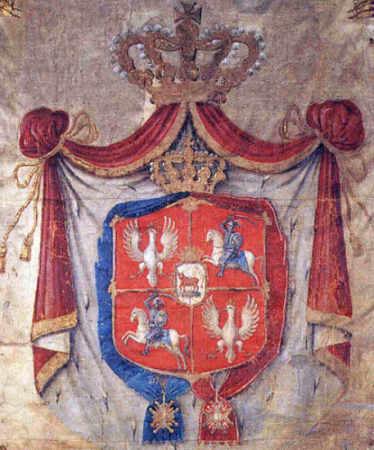
Artwork with the Coat of arms of the Polish–Lithuanian Commonwealth, 1780

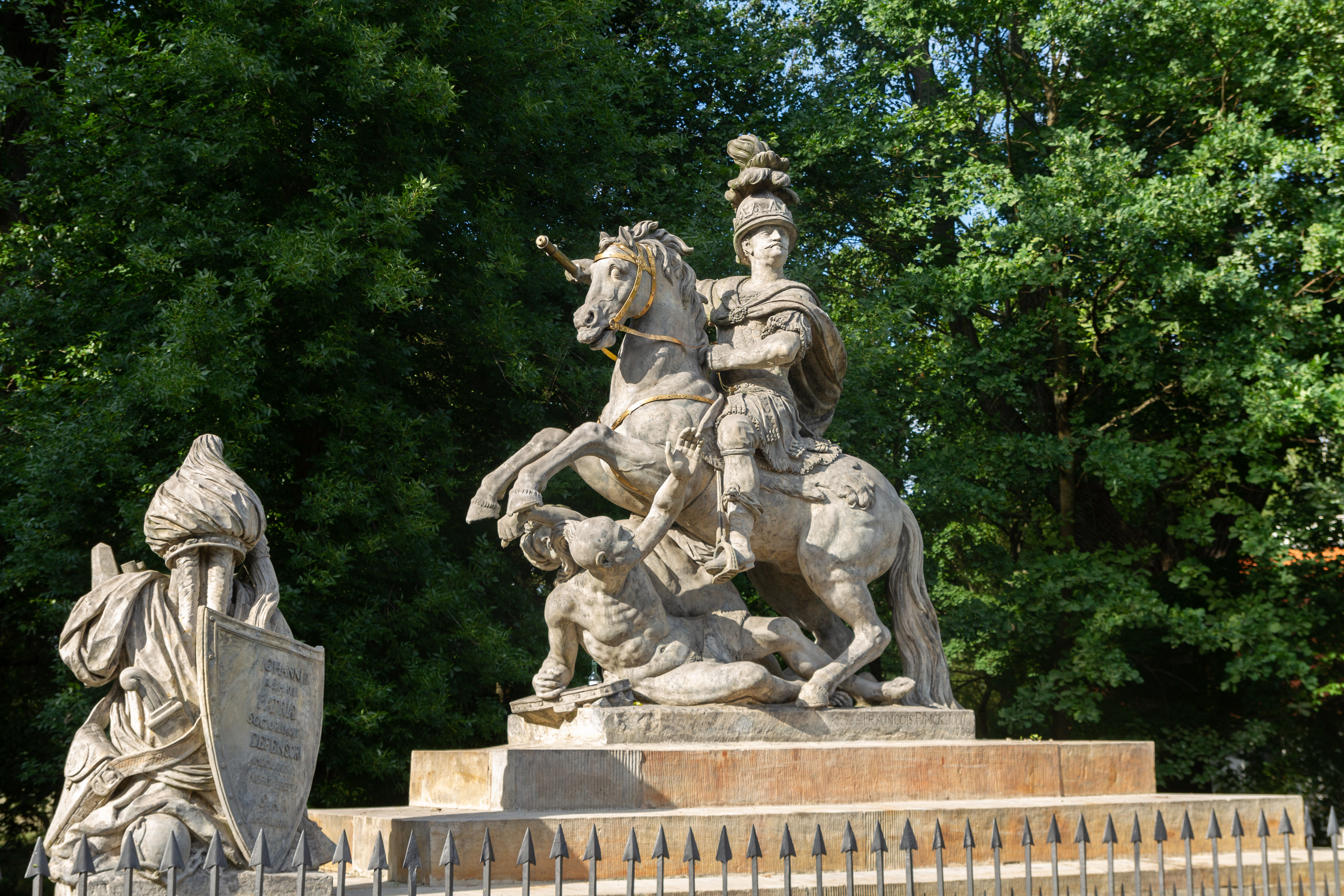
Łazienki Park: monument to John III Sobieski, meant to recall anti-Ottoman sentiment during the Russo-Turkish War (1877–1878)

Stanisław August Poniatowski has been called the Polish Enlightenment's most important patron of the arts. His cultural projects were attuned to his socio-political aims of overthrowing the myth of the Golden Freedoms and the traditional ideology of Sarmatism. His weekly "Thursday Dinners" were considered the most scintillating social functions in the Polish capital. He founded Warsaw's National Theatre, Poland's first public theatre, and sponsored an associated ballet school. He remodeled Ujazdów Palace and the Royal Castle in Warsaw, and erected the elegant Łazienki (Royal Baths) Palace in Warsaw's Łazienki, Park. He involved himself deeply in the detail of his architectural projects, and his eclectic style has been dubbed the "Stanisław August style" by Polish art historian Władysław Tatarkiewicz. His chief architects included Domenico Merlini and Jan Kammsetzer.

He was also a patron to numerous painters. They included Poles such as his protégée, Anna Rajecka and Franciszek Smuglewicz, Jan Bogumił Plersch, son of Jan Jerzy Plersch, Józef Wall, and Zygmunt Vogel, as well as foreign painters including, Marcello Bacciarelli, Bernardo Bellotto, Jean Pillement, Ludwik Marteau, and Per Krafft the Elder. His retinue of sculptors, headed by André-Jean Lebrun, included Giacomo Monaldi, Franz Pinck, and Tommaso Righi. Jan Filip Holzhaeusser was his court engraver and the designer of many commemorative medals. According to a 1795 inventory, Stanisław August's art collection, spread among numerous buildings, contained 2,889 pieces, including works by Rembrandt, Rubens, and van Dyck. His plan to create a large gallery of paintings in Warsaw was disrupted by the dismemberment of the Polish–Lithuanian Commonwealth. Most of the paintings that he had ordered for it can now be seen in London's Dulwich Picture Gallery. Poniatowski also planned to found an Academy of Fine Arts, but this finally came about only after his abdication and departure from Warsaw.

Poniatowski accomplished much in the realm of education and literature. He established the School of Chivalry, also called the "Cadet Corps", which functioned from 1765 to 1794 and whose alumni included Tadeusz Kościuszko. He supported the creation of the Commission of National Education, considered to be the world's first Ministry of Education. In 1765 he helped found the Monitor, one of the first Polish newspapers and the leading periodical of the Polish Enlightenment. He sponsored many articles that appeared in the Monitor. Writers and poets who received his patronage included, Stanisław Trembecki, Franciszek Salezy Jezierski, Franciszek Bohomolec and Franciszek Zabłocki. He also supported publishers including, Piotr Świtkowski, and library owners such as Józef Lex.

He supported the development of the sciences, particularly cartography; he hired a personal cartographer, Karol de Perthees, even before he was elected king. A plan he initiated to map the entire territory of the Commonwealth, however, was never finished. At the Royal Castle in Warsaw, he organized an astronomical observatory and supported astronomers Jan Śniadecki and Marcin Odlanicki Poczobutt. He also sponsored historical studies, including the collection, cataloging and copying of historical manuscripts. He encouraged publications of biographies of famous Polish historical figures, and sponsored paintings and sculptures of them.

For his contributions to the arts and sciences, Poniatowski was awarded in 1766 a royal Fellowship of the Royal Society, where he became the first royal Fellow outside British royalty. In 1778 he was awarded fellowship of the Saint Petersburg Academy of Sciences, and in 1791 of the Berlin Academy of Sciences.

He also supported the development of industry and manufacturing, areas in which the Commonwealth lagged behind most of Western Europe. Among the endeavours in which he invested were the manufacture of cannons and firearms and the mining industry.

Poniatowski himself left several literary works: his memoirs, some political brochures and recorded speeches from the Sejm. He was considered a great orator and a skilled conversationalist.

=== Conflicting assessments ===
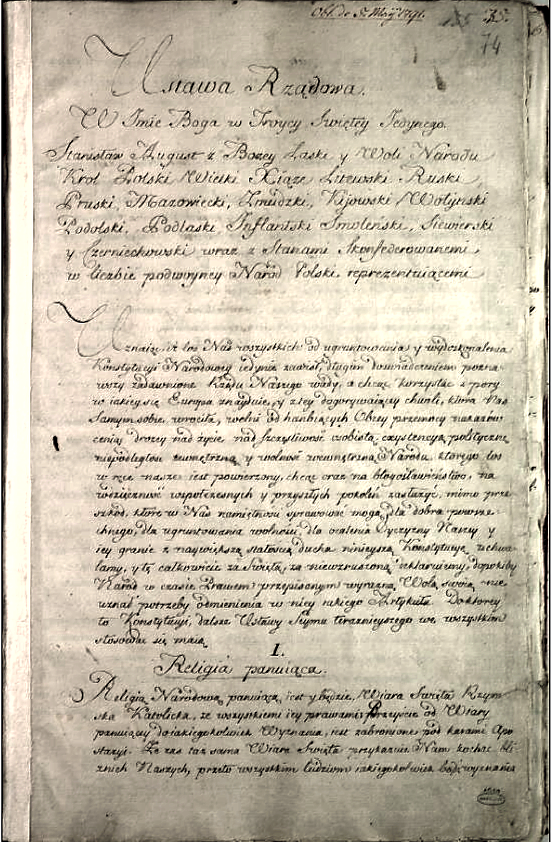
Manuscript of the Constitution of 3 May 1791

King Stanisław Augustus remains a controversial figure. In Polish historiography and in popular works, he has been criticized or marginalized by authors such as, Szymon Askenazy, Joachim Lelewel, Jerzy Łojek (whom Andrzej Zahorski describes as Poniatowski's most vocal critic among modern historians), Tadeusz Korzon, Karol Zyszewski and Krystyna Zienkowska; whereas more neutral or positive views have been expressed by Paweł Jasienica, Walerian Kalinka, Władysław Konopczyński, Stanisław Mackiewicz, Emanuel Rostworowski and Stanisław Wasylewski.

In a work by De Daugnon, an anecdote is quoted that happened to his mother, Constance, in 1732. An Italian named Antonio Formica appears before her, who was assumed to be an astrologer. Seeing the child born on 17 January of that year, he predicted that he would be king of the Poles. The prediction came true many years later, and fortunately, there are records of the existence of a Sicilian physician, Dr. Antonio Formica, who lived in Poland during those years, closely linked to the Polish aristocracy. It is said that it could be the same person.

When elected to the throne, he was seen by many as simply an "instrument for displacing the somnolent Saxons from the throne of Poland", yet as the British historian Norman Davies notes, "he turned out to be an ardent patriot, and a convinced reformer." Still, according to many, his reforms did not go far enough, leading to accusations that he was being overly cautious, even indecisive, a fault to which he himself admitted. His decision to rely on Russia has often been criticized. Poniatowski saw Russia as a "lesser evil" – willing to support the notional "independence" of a weak Poland within the Russian sphere of influence. However, in the event Russia imposed the Partitions of Poland rather than choose to support internal reform. He was accused by others of weakness and subservience, even of treason, especially in the years following the Second Partition. During the Kościuszko Uprising, there were rumours that Polish Jacobins had been planning a coup d'état and Poniatowski's assassination. Another line of criticism alleged poor financial management on his part. Poniatowski actually had little personal wealth. Most of his income came from Crown Estates and monopolies. His lavish patronage of the arts and sciences was a major drain on the royal treasury. He also supported numerous public initiatives and attempted to use the royal treasury to cover the state's expenses when tax revenues were insufficient. The Sejm promised several times to compensate its treasury to little practical effect. Nonetheless, contemporary critics frequently accused him of being a spendthrift.

Andrzej Zahorski dedicated a book to a discussion of Poniatowski, The Dispute over Stanisław August (Spór o Stanisława Augusta, Warsaw, 1988). He notes that the discourse concerning Poniatowski is significantly coloured by the fact that he was the last King of Poland – the King who failed to save the country. This failure, and his prominent position, rendered him a convenient scapegoat for many. Zahorski argues that Poniatowski made the error of joining the Targowica Confederation. Although he wanted to preserve the integrity of the Polish state, it was far too late for that – he succeeded instead in cementing the damage to his own reputation for succeeding centuries.

=== Remembrance ===
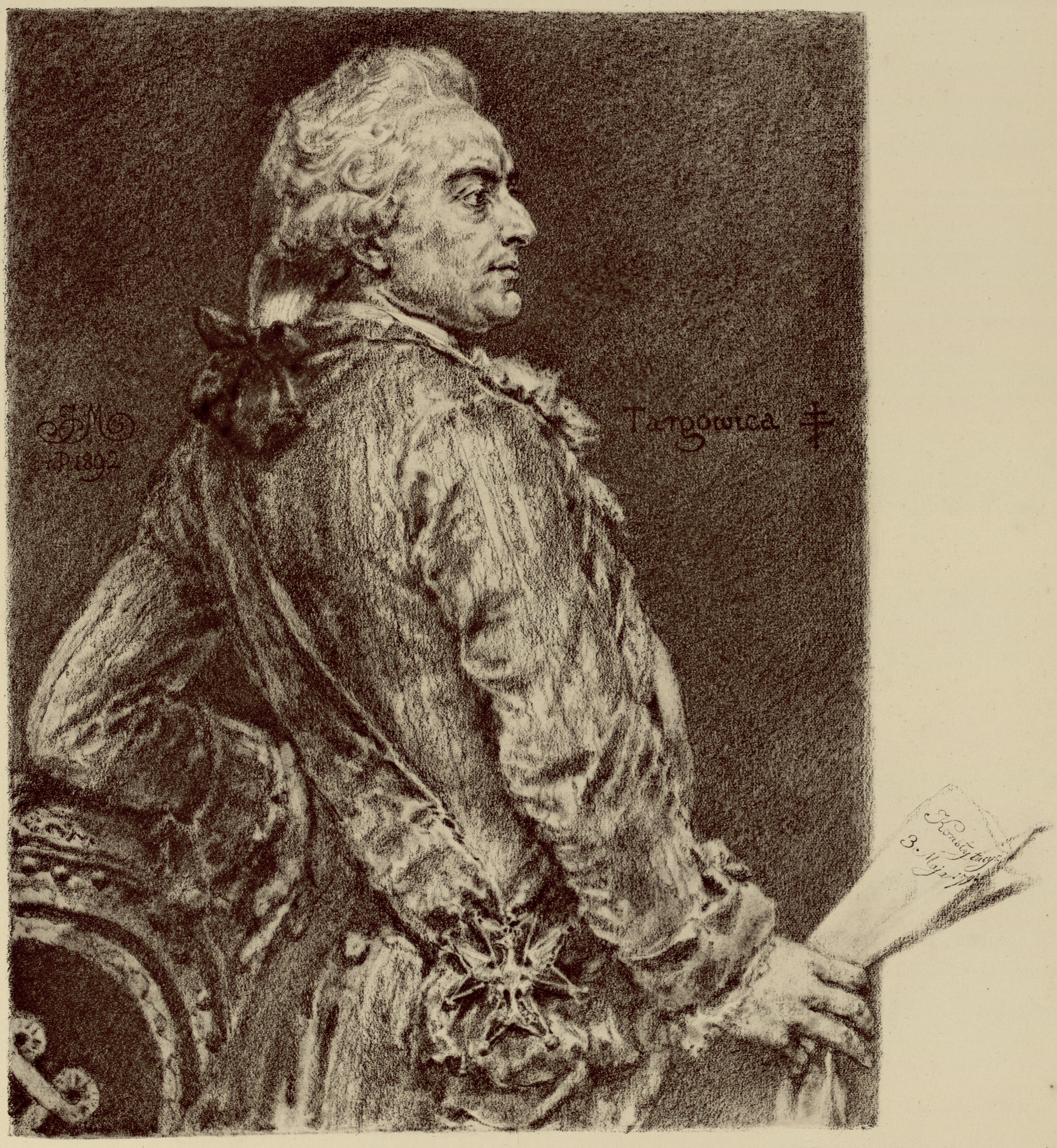
Poniatowski: pencil drawing by Jan Matejko

Poniatowski has been the subject of numerous biographies and many works of art. Voltaire, who saw Poniatowski as a model reformist, based his character King Teucer in the play Les Lois de Minos (1772) on Poniatowski. At least 58 contemporary poems were dedicated to him or praised him. Since then, he has been a major character in many works of Józef Ignacy Kraszewski, in the Rok 1794 trilogy by Władysław Stanisław Reymont, in the novels of Tadeusz Łopalewski, and in the dramas of Ignacy Grabowski, Tadeusz Miciński, Roman Brandstaetter and Bogdan Śmigielski. He is discussed in Luise Mühlbach's novel Joseph II and His Court, and appears in Jane Porter's 1803 novel, Thaddeus of Warsaw.

On screen he has been played by Wieńczysław Gliński in the 1976 3 Maja directed by Grzegorz Królikiewicz. He appears in a Russian TV series.

Poniatowski is depicted in numerous portraits, medals and coins. He is prominent in Jan Matejko's work, especially in the 1891 painting, Constitution of 3 May 1791 and in another large canvas, Rejtan, and in his series of portraits of Polish monarchs. A bust of Poniatowski was unveiled in Łazienki Palace in 1992. A number of cities in Poland have streets named after him, including Kraków and Warsaw.

== Family ==
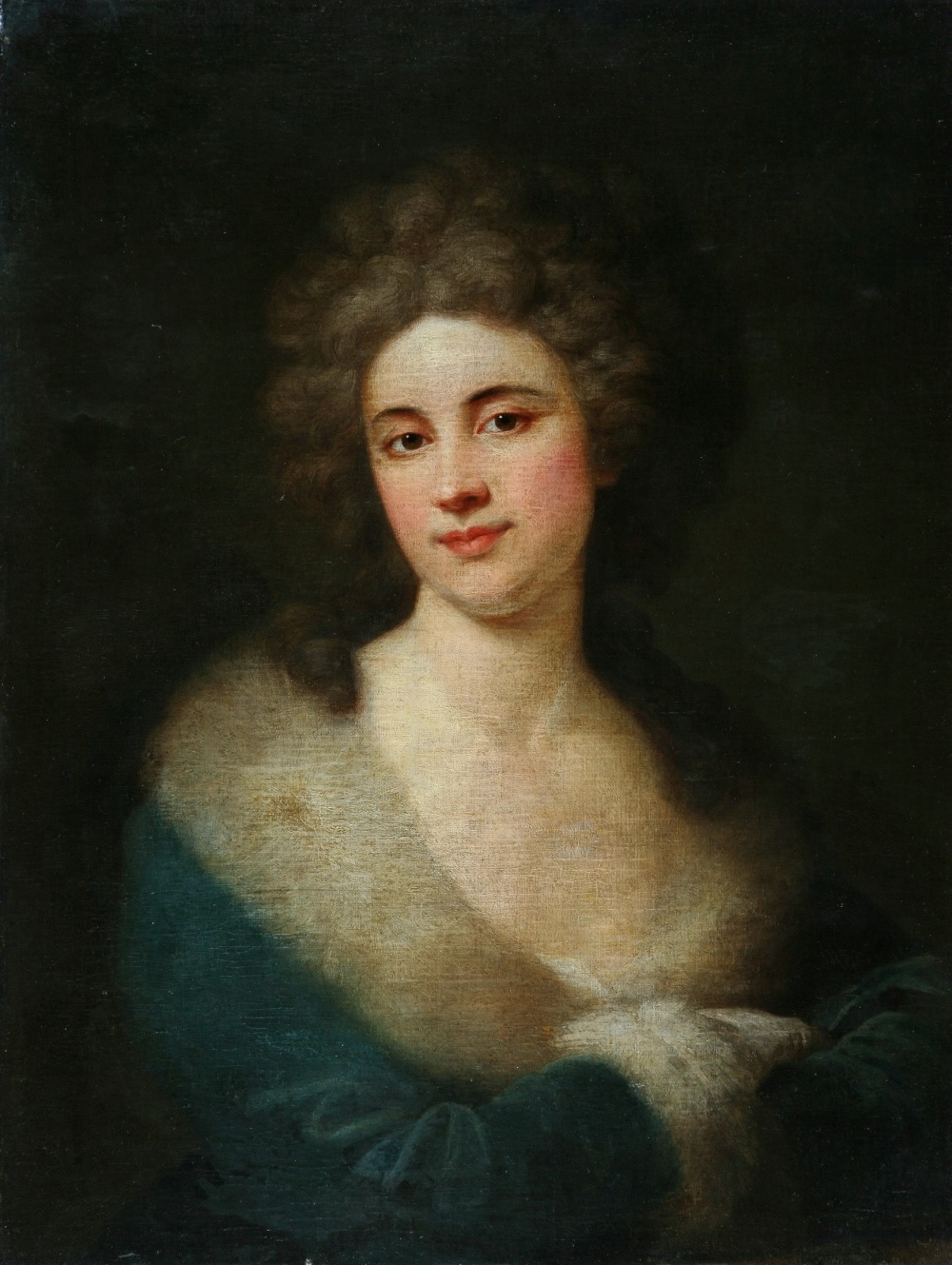
Elżbieta Szydłowska Grabowska, by Johann Baptist von Lampi the Elder

Poniatowski never married, or at least, never officially announced he had married. In his youth, he had loved his cousin Elżbieta Czartoryska, but her father August Aleksander Czartoryski disapproved because he did not think him influential or rich enough. When this was no longer an issue, she was already married. His pacta conventa specified that he should marry a Polish noblewoman, although he himself always hoped to marry into some royal family.

Upon his accession to the throne, he had hopes of marrying Catherine II, writing to her on 2 November 1763 in a moment of doubt, "If I desired the throne, it was because I saw you on it." When she made it clear through his envoy Rzewuski that she would not marry him, there were hopes of an Austrian archduchess, Archduchess Maria Elisabeth of Austria (1743–1808). A marriage to Princess Sophia Albertina of Sweden was suggested despite the religious differences, but this match was opposed by his sisters, Ludwika Maria Poniatowska and Izabella Poniatowska, and nothing came of it. The ceremonial role of queen and hostess of his court was played by his favourite niece, Urszula Zamoyska.

He had several notable lovers, including Elżbieta Branicka, who acted as his political adviser and financier, and had children with two of them. With Magdalena Agnieszka Sapieżyna (1739–1780), he became the father of Konstancja Żwanowa (1768–1810) and Michał Cichocki (1770–1828).

In a work by De Daugnon, an anecdote is quoted that happened to his mother, Constance, in 1732. An Italian named Antonio Formica appears before her, who was assumed to be an astrologer. Seeing the child born on 17 January of that year, he predicted that he would be king of the Poles. The prediction came true many years later, and there are records of the existence of a Sicilian doctor, Dr. Antonio Formica, who lived in Poland during those years, closely linked to the Polish aristocracy. It is said that it could be the same person.

=== Possible marriage ===
A few historians believe that Stanisław contracted a secret marriage with Elżbieta Szydłowska. Stanisław Wasylewski, based on reports by diarists and genealogists, claimed there existed the wedding document that says Elżbieta and King Stanisław married in 1785; however that would mean Elżbieta committed bigamy. The supposed wedding metrics is currently missing. In 1789 Grabowski died, leaving Elżbieta free to remarry, but if any marriage ever took place between her and the monarch (whether before or after the death of her first husband), it was never publicly announced. Jerzy Besala speculates that if Stanisław indeed married his mistress, he might have wanted to keep it secret to avoid potential unrest among nobles, as happened before in Polish history when ruler was committing mésalliance, like in cases of Casimir the Great and Krystyna of Praga, Władysław Jagiełło and Elisabeth of Pilica, or Sigismund August and Barbara Radziwiłł.

However, according to Wirydianna Fiszerowa, a contemporary who knew them both, this rumour only spread after the death of Poniatowski, was generally disbelieved, and moreover, was circulated by Elżbieta herself, so the marriage is considered by her to be unlikely.

Stanisław and Elżbieta had several children, all born before their alleged marriage:

- Stanisław Konopnicy-Grabowski (1780–1845)
- Michał Grabowski (1773–1812)
- Kazimierz Grabowski (1770–?)^{[a]}
- Konstancja Grabowska^{[a]}
- Izabela Grabowska (1776–1858).

=== Issue ===
Name	Birth	Death	Notes
By Catherine the Great
Anna Petrovna	9 December 1757	8 March 1758	Her legal father was Catherine's husband, Peter III of Russia; but most historians assume that Anna Petrovna's biological father was Poniatowski
By Magdalena Agnieszka Sapieżyna
Konstancja Żwanowa	1768	1810	married Karol Żwan; no issue (divorced)
Michał Cichocki	September 1770	5 May 1828	
By Elżbieta Szydłowska
Konstancja Grabowska	?	?	married Wincenty Dernałowicz. Not all sources agree she was Poniatowski's child.^{[a]}
Michał Grabowski	1773	17 August 1812	Brigadier general of the Army of the Duchy of Warsaw; died in the Battle of Smolensk (1812); no issue
Izabela Grabowska	26 March 1776	21 May 1858	married Walenty Sobolewski; had three daughters
Stanisław Grabowski	29 October 1780	3 October 1845	married twice
Kazimierz Grabowski	?	?	Not all sources agree he was Poniatowski's child.^{[a]}

== Titles, honours and arms ==
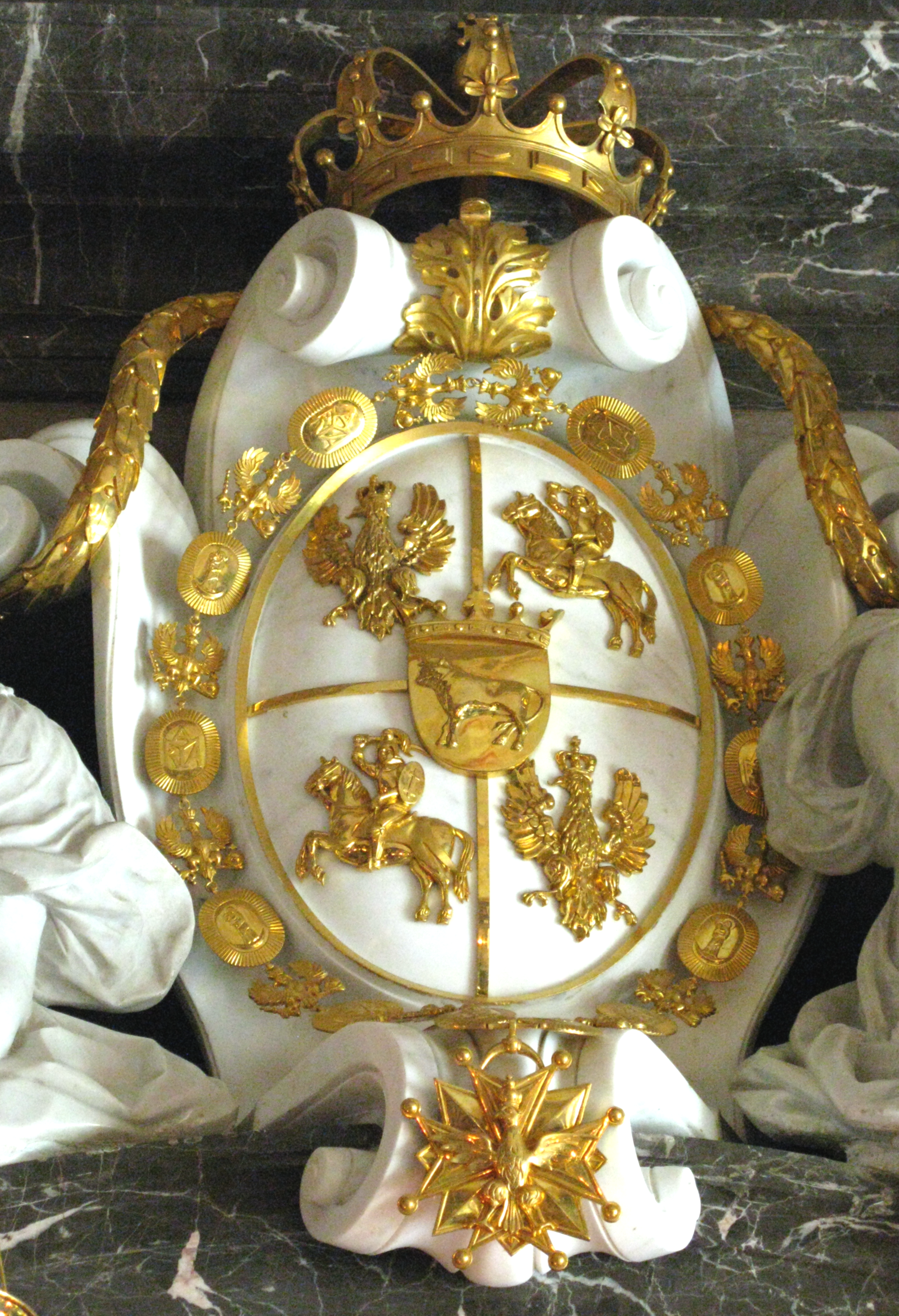
Coat of Arms of Stanisław August Poniatowski with colland of Order of White Eagle

The English translation of the Polish text of the 1791 Constitution gives his title as Stanisław August, by the grace of God and the will of the people, King of Poland, Grand Duke of Lithuania and Duke of Ruthenia, Prussia, Masovia, Samogitia, Kiev, Volhynia, Podolia, Podlasie, Livonia, Smolensk, Severia and Chernihiv.

=== National ===
- Poland–Lithuania: Order of the White Eagle (1756)
- Poland–Lithuania: Order of Saint Stanislaus (1765)
- Poland–Lithuania: Order of Virtuti Militari (1792)

=== Foreign ===
- Prussia: Order of the Black Eagle (5 April 1764)
- Russian Empire: Order of Saint Andrew (1764)

== See also ==
- History of Poland (1569–1795)
- Poles in the United Kingdom
- Warsaw Society of Friends of Learning

== Notes ==
a Sources vary as to whether Konstancja Grabowska and Kazimierz Grabowski were Poniatowski's children. They are listed as such by several sources, including Jerzy Michalski's article on Stanisław August Poniatowski in the Polish Biographical Dictionary. However, Maria Minakowska's website on descendants of Great Sejm participants lists neither Kazimierz Grabowski nor Konstancja Grabowska as Poniatowski's children; and for Elżbieta Szydłowska, it lists only Kazimierz Grabowski as Jan Jerzy Grabowski's child.

== Bibliography ==
- Marek Żukow-Karczewski, "Stanisław August w Petersburgu" ("Stanisław August in Saint Petersburg") (in Polish), Życie Literackie, No. 43, 1987, pp. 1, 6.

Stanisław August Poniatowski House of Poniatowski Born: 17 January 1732 12 February 1798
Regnal titles
Preceded by Augustus III	King of Poland; 1764–1795	Succeeded by Leopold II, Holy Roman Emperor as King of Galicia and Lodomeria
Preceded by Augustus III	King of Poland; 1764–1795	Succeeded by Frederick Augustus I of Saxony as Duke of Warsaw
Preceded by Augustus III	King of Poland; 1764–1795	Succeeded by Frederick William III of Prussia as Grand Duke of Posen
Preceded by Augustus III	King of Poland; 1764–1795	Succeeded by Alexander I of Russia as King of Poland
Preceded by Augustus III	Grand Duke of Lithuania; 1764–1795	Succeeded by Alexander I of Russia as King of Poland
