= Władysław Studnicki =

Polish politician and Germanophile

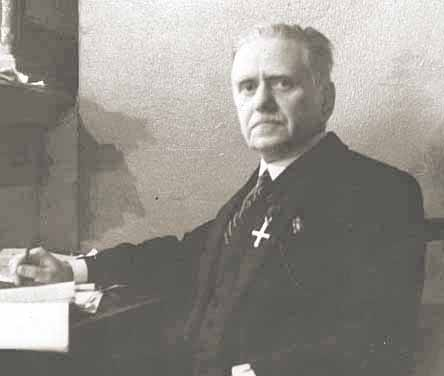
- Portrait of Studnicki c. 1939
- Born: Władysław Gizbert-Studnicki; November 15, 1867; Dinaburg, Vitebsk Governorate, Russian Empire
- Died: January 10, 1953 (aged 85); County of London, England, UK
- Resting place: St Mary's Catholic Cemetery
- Organization: Provisional Council of State
- Political party: National Radical Organization
- Other political affiliations: Proletariat; PPS; SDN; KTSSN
- Movement: Polish nationalism
- Spouse: Alina Brylińska
- Children: Konrad

Władysław Gizbert-Studnicki (15 November 1867 – 10 January 1953) was a Polish politician and publicist. Throughout his life, Studnicki was famous for his strongly pro-German stance, and in the Polish People's Republic all his books were banned from publication. He was the older brother of historian Wacław Studnicki.

== Before 1918 ==
Studnicki was born on 15 November 1867 in Dinaburg, Vitebsk Governorate, Russian Empire, into a Polish szlachta family of the Kresy region. Both his parents fought in the January Uprising. His political career started in late 19th century at the Kronenberg Trade School in Warsaw, in the socialist organization Proletariat, for which the Russian authorities sent him first to the Warsaw Citadel (7 December 1888), and then to Eastern Siberia, where he spent six years. After returning from exile in 1896, he became an activist of the Polish Socialist Party, but left it, choosing the national movement, in which he was the main ideologist. However, unhappy about the pro-Russian program of the nationalists, he deserted them and in 1904 wrote a book Od socjalizmu do nacjonalizmu (transl. From Socialism to Nationalism), in which he explained the reasons for the change in his ideals. In 1901, after visiting Vienna and Heidelberg, he settled in Austrian Galicia. In 1903 Studnicki moved to Lwów, where he founded the Tygodnik Lwowski news magazine.

In 1910 he authored another publication, Sprawę polską (transl. The Polish Case), in which he presented the case for reconstructing Poland, with the support of Austria-Hungary and the German Empire. Also, at that time, Studnicki proposed changing Austria-Hungary into the Austrian-Hungarian-Polish federation. He was strongly anti-Russian, emphasizing that the Russian Empire occupied 80% of the territory of the 1772 Polish–Lithuanian Commonwealth (see: Partitions of Poland).

In the mid-1910s, Studnicki became one of the most important pro-German politicians in Poland. On 10 May 1916 he met Hans Hartwig von Beseler, Governor General of Warsaw, to whom he presented a blueprint of independent Poland, with eastern borders along the Dvina and Berezina rivers and western borders unchanged, leaving Poznań, Bydgoszcz and Upper Silesia in German possession. Later, he became a member of the Provisional Council of State, a German-sponsored government, existing in Warsaw in the years 1916–1918, see Kingdom of Poland (1916–18). Studnicki was so influential in Polish politics in the late 1910s, that Matthias Erzberger called him the "spiritual father of the Act of 5th November, 1916". Therefore, Studnicki can be regarded as one of "founding fathers" of the Second Polish Republic, together with Roman Dmowski and Józef Piłsudski.

== Interbellum Poland ==
In the Second Polish Republic Studnicki devoted his time to writing. He authored a number of books, among them Political System of Europe and Poland (1935), A Question of Czechoslovakia and Polish Raison d’Etat (1938) and, finally Facing the Oncoming Second World War (1939) in which he correctly assessed and anticipated the events of the conflict.

In Political System of Europe and Poland (System polityczny Europy a Polska), Studnicki wrote:

"Poland and Germany can become the foundation of a large Central European bloc, together with Austria, Hungary, Czech, Romania, Bulgaria, Yugoslavia, Turkey, Greece and the Baltic states: altogether, 200 million people".

In his view, this bloc would oppose the Soviet Union. Studnicki correctly predicted the Anschluss and the collapse of Czechoslovakia, but in his opinion, stated in 1939, the annexation of Trans-Olza into Poland was an inadequate reward for not allowing the Workers' and Peasants' Red Army to pass through Polish territory.

Apart from writing, Studnicki worked as a civil servant. He was established and managed the Statistical Office of the Civil Administration of the Eastern Lands (1919–1920). Later he was a consultant at the Ministry of Industry and Trade (1922–1926) and the Ministry of Foreign Affairs (1928–1930). Furthermore, he lectured at the Institute of Trade and Economic Sciences in Wilno. In 1935 and 1938 he stood in elections to the Sejm, but failed to convince Polish voters.

In a manner similar to National Democracy politicians, Studnicki espoused the view that Jews were "parasites on the healthy branch of the Polish tree". His work Sprawa polsko-zydowska was filled with antisemitic idioms, and advocated for the emigration of 100,000 Jewish Poles per annum with the goal of "dejudaization of Poland" in thirty years. Studnicki called for the establishment of a Polish protectorate in Mandatory Palestine.

== 1939 ==
In March 1939 Studnicki wrote in Słowo that the German occupation of Czechoslovakia was a mistake, as it provoked anti-German feelings among Poles, and worsened Poland's geostrategic situation. Nevertheless, he continued to advocate a Polish-German alliance. On 6 April, a Polish-British communiqué was issued (see Anglo-Polish military alliance), regarding mutual guarantees. Studnicki knew well that a Polish-German conflict was imminent, trying to do everything he could to prevent it. On 13 April 1939, he wrote a letter to Minister Józef Beck, warning that acceptance of British guarantees meant catastrophe for Poland. In his opinion, Poland should remain neutral in the oncoming war. He correctly predicted that the victory of Western Allies would draw Poland into the Soviet sphere of influence, loss of her independence and eastern territories. According to him, the Polish government should end all kinds of anti-German activities and try to peacefully settle all mutual problems. Studnicki proposed that the Free City of Danzig should be handed over to the Third Reich, in exchange he expected the lease of the port of Liepāja in Latvia and German agreement of a Polish protectorate of independent Slovakia.

On 5 May 1939, Studnicki wrote "Memo Against the War with Germany", sending it to all members of the Polish government, except for Felicjan Sławoj Składkowski. He warned that acceptance of British guarantees increased the risk of armed conflict and as a result of this step, Poland would be the first victim of German attack: "When one faces an enemy on two fronts, the weaker enemy is liquidated first. And we are the weaker enemy in this case (...) Poland should pledge neutrality, renounce the alliance with Britain and move its army eastwards, to protect the Soviet border".

Studnicki claimed that Poland should promote the notion of armed neutrality, as her priority should be not to allow the Red Army to enter Polish territory. Nevertheless, the declaration of neutrality would end the Central European bloc, and was only a desperate attempt to postpone the conflict and preserve Poland's independence.

In June 1939, Studnicki published his last book of the interwar period, Wobec nadchodzącej drugiej wojny światowej (transl. Facing the Oncoming Second World War). All copies of the book were immediately confiscated by the government censorship office, and the Warsaw authorities planned to send the author to the Bereza Kartuska concentration camp. Studnicki precisely predicted the events of the oncoming conflict. He claimed that the Free City of Danzig in itself was not the sole reason of Polish-German disagreement. The conflict was about the Polish role in the war, whether she would join Germany or the Allied camp. British guarantees were aimed at drawing Poland to the Allied camp, but their acceptance meant that Germany would attack Poland first. To avoid this, Poland should hand Danzig over to Germany and agree to the construction of an extraterritorial highway and rail line through the Polish Corridor.

As for the British guarantees, Studnicki claimed that during the 1920s and early 1930s, Great Britain had not expressed any interest in Poland, so the sudden change of mood in London was, in his opinion, insincere: "This alleged British concern over Polish interests along the Baltic Sea has a well-defined foundation. The British want German military power to attack Poland first, at the beginning of the war, when Britain is not yet ready for the conflict". In Studnicki's opinion, the Anglo-Polish alliance was very dangerous to Poland, as London wanted to draw the Soviet Union into the war as its ally. The Soviets would be rewarded with eastern Polish territories.

== Second World War ==
During the war Studnicki, whose pro-German stance was well known to the German authorities, frequently intervened in support of arrested and executed Polish activists. Due to his efforts, the fascist politician Bolesław Piasecki, creator of the National Radical Camp Falanga, was released from German prison.

In most cases, however, Studnicki's interventions did not help. As a result, in January 1940 he decided to issue a "Memo to the German Government", in which he expressed his opposition to the policy of German occupational authorities, based on bloody terror. In his view, this stance would result in growing anti-German feelings among ethnic Poles, which would make it impossible to create an agreement between Poles and Germans, aimed at the Soviet Union.

Furthermore, a few weeks after the Invasion of Poland, Studnicki presented to German military authorities the "Memo on Recreation of Polish Army and the Oncoming German - Soviet War". In this document, he proposed recreation of the Polish Army, which would fight the Red Army alongside the Wehrmacht. Furthermore, he suggested that a Polish Government should be recreated. To make this happen, German authorities should cease killings and repression of Polish activists. The Polish Army, in cooperation with the Wehrmacht, was to seize the territories west of the Dniepr river, while Germans were to march further east, to the Caucasus.

Both memos were confiscated by the Germans. Desperate, Studnicki decided then to personally visit Berlin, and talk to Adolf Hitler. In late January 1940, he went to Berlin, and talked with Joseph Goebbels, but his efforts were fruitless. After the conversation, he was interned at Babelsberg, but was released following a plea of Hermann Göring. In August 1940 Studnicki returned to Warsaw. He remained in touch with the German authorities, and his continuous pleas for better treatment of Poles resulted in his arrest on 10 July 1941. Studnicki remained in Pawiak Prison until August 1942, when he was released due to poor health and the efforts of both Maurycy Stanisław Potocki and the Hungarian ambassador.

In the final years of the war, Studnicki criticized both German terror and Polish resistance, whose activities resulted in German reprisals and suffering of the civilian population. In his opinion, the Soviet Union was the main enemy of Poland, and all Polish forces should concentrate their efforts on fighting the Soviets.

In July 1944 he left for Hungary, and then Austria. In 1945 he moved to Rome, and finally, in late 1946, Studnicki settled in London. Due to his uncompromising stance and unpopular convictions, he was isolated by other Polish emigres. Furthermore, in 1948 he volunteered to defend Generalfeldmarschall Erich von Manstein, but the court decided not to send for him. In 1951, the government of the Republic of Poland banned all his books.

== After the war ==
Before his death, Studnicki published his Second World War memoirs. In Tragyczne Manowce (transl. Tragic Days) he tried to explain and justify his pro-Nazi stance. Originally, Studnicki's memoirs were titled How I did not become a Polish Vidkun Quisling, but Mieczysław Grydzewski, editor in chief of Polish News, which published the book, decided to change the title.

Several contemporary Polish historians, such as Jerzy Łojek, Andrzej Piskozub, and Paweł Wieczorkiewicz have stated that Studnicki was right back in the summer of 1939. They all claim that the only solution at that time was to sign an alliance with Germany, in order to avoid wartime destruction and communism. Another historian, Tomasz Gabis wrote in his book Imperial Games (2008) that if, in the summer of 1939, Poland had come to an agreement with Germany, the war would have never taken place, as France and the United Kingdom would have had no reason to declare it on Germany. Instead of the Molotov–Ribbentrop Pact, a Central European anti-Soviet bloc would have been created. Another supporter of Studnicki's views is Piotr Zychowicz in his book Pact Ribbentrop - Beck.

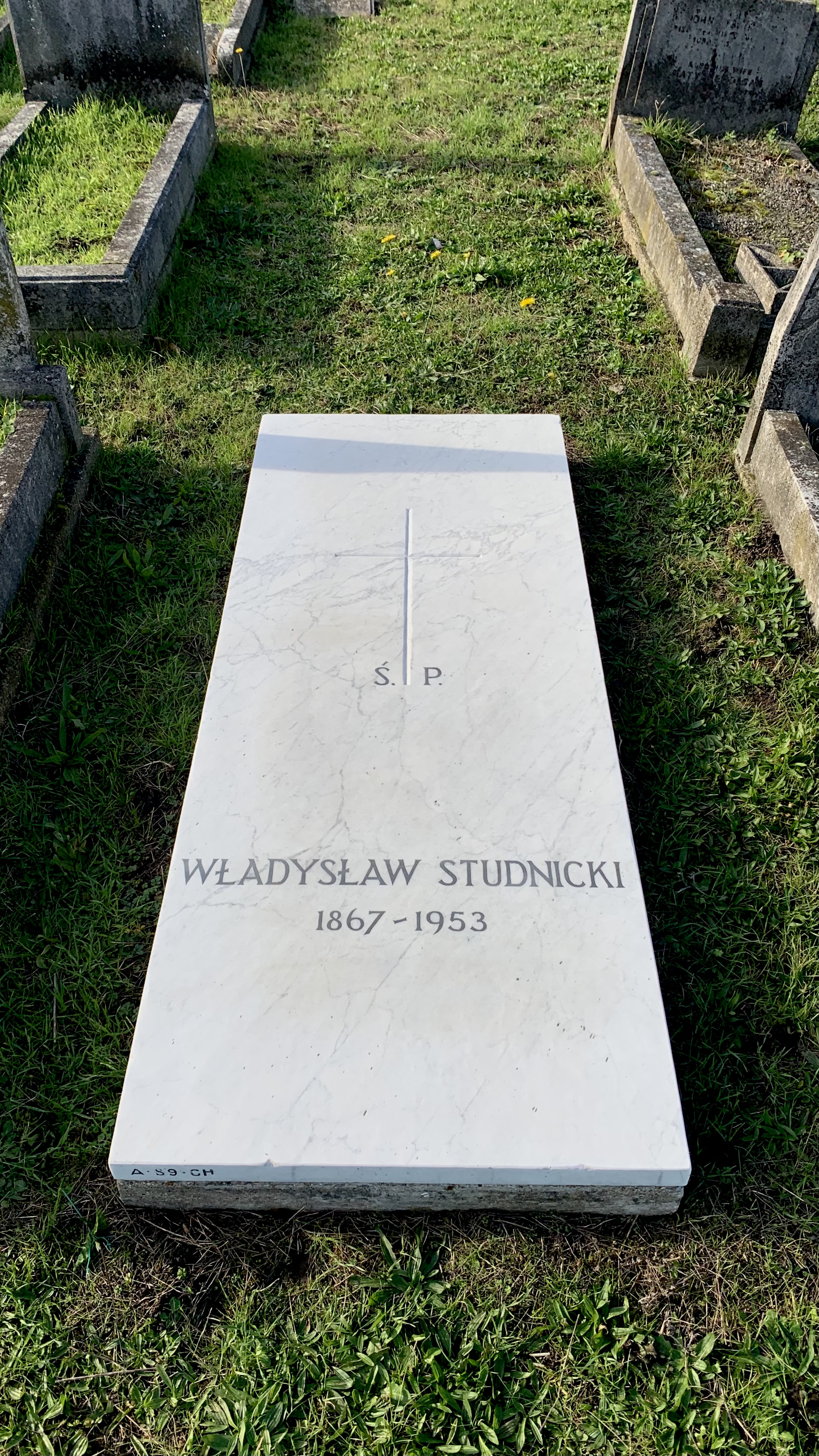
The tomb of Władysław Studnicki after the renovation (July 2020)

Władysław Studnicki died on 10 January 1953 in London.

== Works ==
- Władysław Studnicki Pisma wybrane, Tom 1 Z przeżyć i walk, Toruń 2001, Wyd. Adam Marszałek, ISBN 83-7174-554-0
- Władysław Studnicki Pisma wybrane, Tom 2 Polityka międzynarodowa Polski w okresie międzywojennym, Toruń 2009, Wyd. Adam Marszałek, ISBN 83-7322-288-X
- Władysław Studnicki Pisma wybrane, Tom 3 Ludzie, idee i czyny, Toruń 2000, Wyd. Adam Marszałek, ISBN 83-7174-610-5
- Władysław Studnicki Pisma wybrane, Tom 4 Tragiczne manowce. Próby przeciwdziałania katastrofom narodowym 1939–1945, Toruń 2002, Wyd. Adam Marszałek, ISBN 83-7322-289-8

== Sources ==
- Polski Słownik Biograficzny, tom 45/1, wyd. 2007
- Jacek Gzella, Zaborcy i sąsiedzi Polski w myśli społeczno-politycznej Władysława Studnickiego: (do 1939 roku), Toruń 1998.
- Jan Sadkiewicz, "Ci, którzy przekonać nie umieją". Idea porozumienia polsko-niemieckiego w publicystyce Władysława Studnickiego i wileńskiego "Słowa" (do 1939), Kraków 2012.
- Gaweł Strządała, Niemcy w myśli politycznej Władsława Studnickiego, Opole 2011.
