= Bożena Mamontowicz-Łojek =

Polish historian

- Born: Zenona Bożena Mamontowicz; December 22, 1937; Warsaw, Warsaw Voivodeship, Second Polish Republic
- Died: April 10, 2010 (aged 72); Smolensk North Airport, Smolensk Oblast, Russian Federation
- Resting place: Powązki Cemetery
- Education: University of Warsaw
- Political party: PC-ZP
- Spouse: Jerzy Łojek

Bożena Mamontowicz-Łojek (born Zenona Bożena Mamontowicz; 22 December 1937 – 10 April 2010) was a Polish historian and activist. She studied history of Polish theater and ballet. She was President of the Polish Katyn Foundation. She was wife of Jerzy Łojek, historian.

She died in the 2010 Polish Air Force Tu-154 crash near Smolensk on 10 April 2010. She was posthumously awarded the Order of Polonia Restituta.

== See also ==
- List of casualties of the Smolensk air disaster
