= Magdalena Agnieszka Sapieżyna =

Polish aristocrat

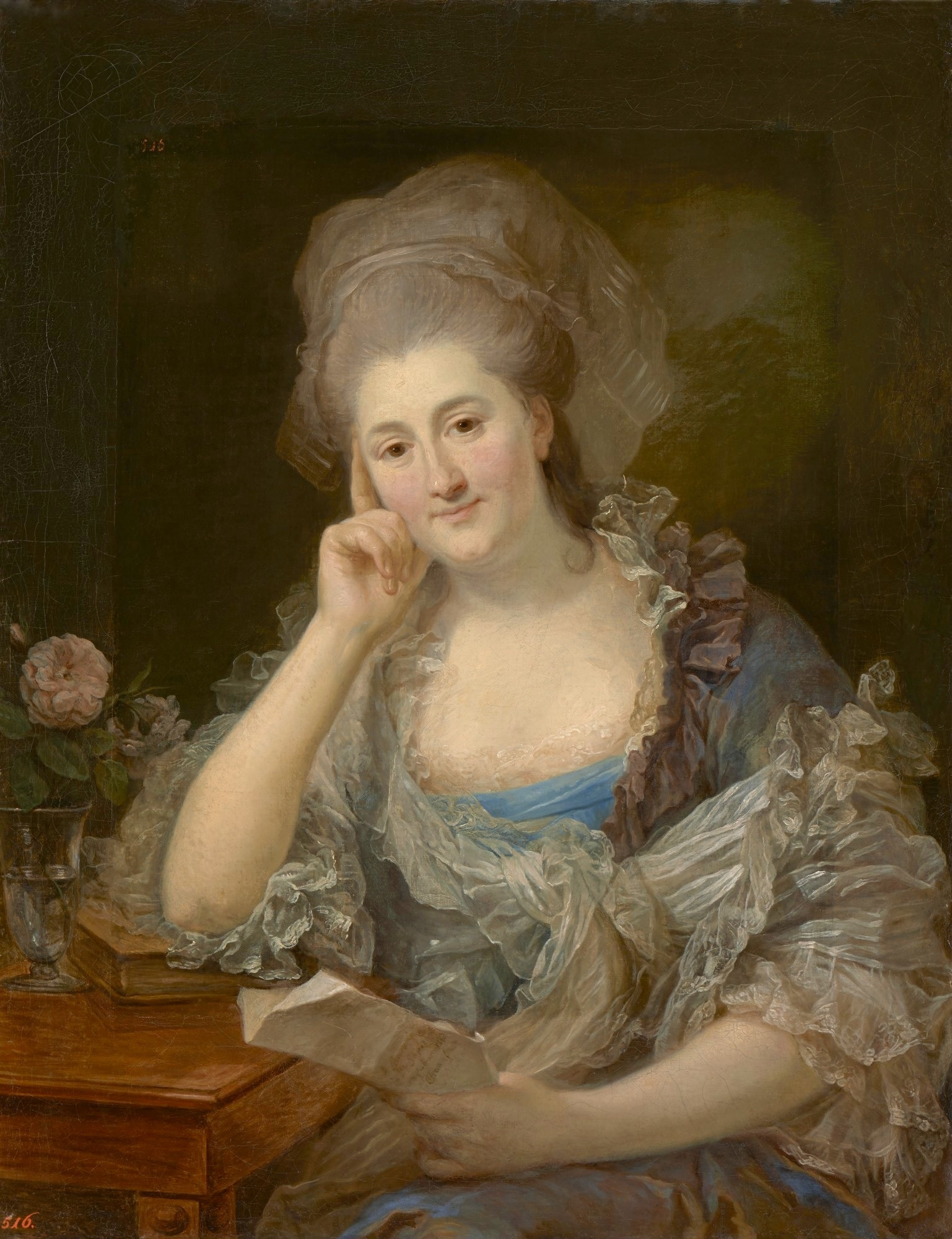
Magdalena Sapieha

Magdalena Agnieszka Sapieżyna (1739–1780) was a Polish aristocrat. She was known as the mistress of King Stanisław August Poniatowski and had a child with him, Michał Cichocki, in 1770.

== Life ==
She was born as daughter of Prince Antoni Benedykt Lubomirski and his wife Anna Zofia Ożarowska (1716–1759).

She married first to Prince Józef Lubomirski in 1755, and secondly to Prince Aleksander Michał Sapieha in 1757. She was interested in politics and influenced and supported the political career of her spouse. In 1762, she supported him against Count Heinrich von Brühl, and in April 1763, she participated alongside him in the Vilnius court. She agitated in the court in favor of Prince Michał Józef Massalski. During the interregnum of 1763, she persuade her spouse to join the Familia (political party).

From about 1763, she had an affair with king Stanisław August Poniatowski in parallel with Elżbieta Branicka, but her affair was more discreet. It is noted that she and her spouse did not live together in 1765–1772, and she was given an allowance by the king. Her husband was not willing to be named as the father of some of the children she gave birth to during these years.

She is known as a patron of theater. During the 1770s, she was a member of a theatrical society and the family managed several theaters in their palaces.
