= Michał Grabowski =

Polish military commander

Michał Grabowski Poniatowski of the Oksza coat of arms (1773 – 17 August 1812) was a brigadier general of the Army of Duchy of Warsaw.

== Early life ==
He was the natural son of the King of Poland and Grand Duke of Lithuania, Stanisław August Poniatowski and Elizabeth Grabowska, from the house Szydłowska and brother of Stanislaw Grabowski.

He stayed under the care of King Stanisław August Poniatowski who was on the alert during his army career.

== 1790s ==
During the 1792 war with Russia, he was a major of the 5th Regiment of Fusiliers. In 1794, during the Kościuszko Uprising, as the adjutant he stayed in surrounding the king. After the Third Partition he kept which company in Hrodna and Saint Petersburg.

== Napoleonic Wars ==
He participated in the campaign of 1807, commanding the 1st Infantry Regiment in Poniatowski's Division. Appointed brigadier general, he became a commanding officer of the fort in Gdańsk, and a little bit later became a commanding officer of the Modlin Fortress, which was still being built. In 1808, he was a commander of the brigade in of 3 Divisions. From 1809-1810, he commanded the Danzig garrison under Jean Rapp.

In 1811, he was sent on a military mission to the Dresden. In 1812, during the expedition of Napoleon to Russia, he commanded the 1st Brigade of Kniaziewicz's 18th Division in the V Corps. On July 4 1812, in Hrodna, he signed the accession to the general confederacy of the Congress Kingdom of Poland established in 1815 at the Congress of Vienna. He was appointed the governor of Mogilev. On 17 August 1812, he was killed during the Battle of Smolensk.
