= Aleksander Michał Sapieha =

Polish noble (1730–1793)

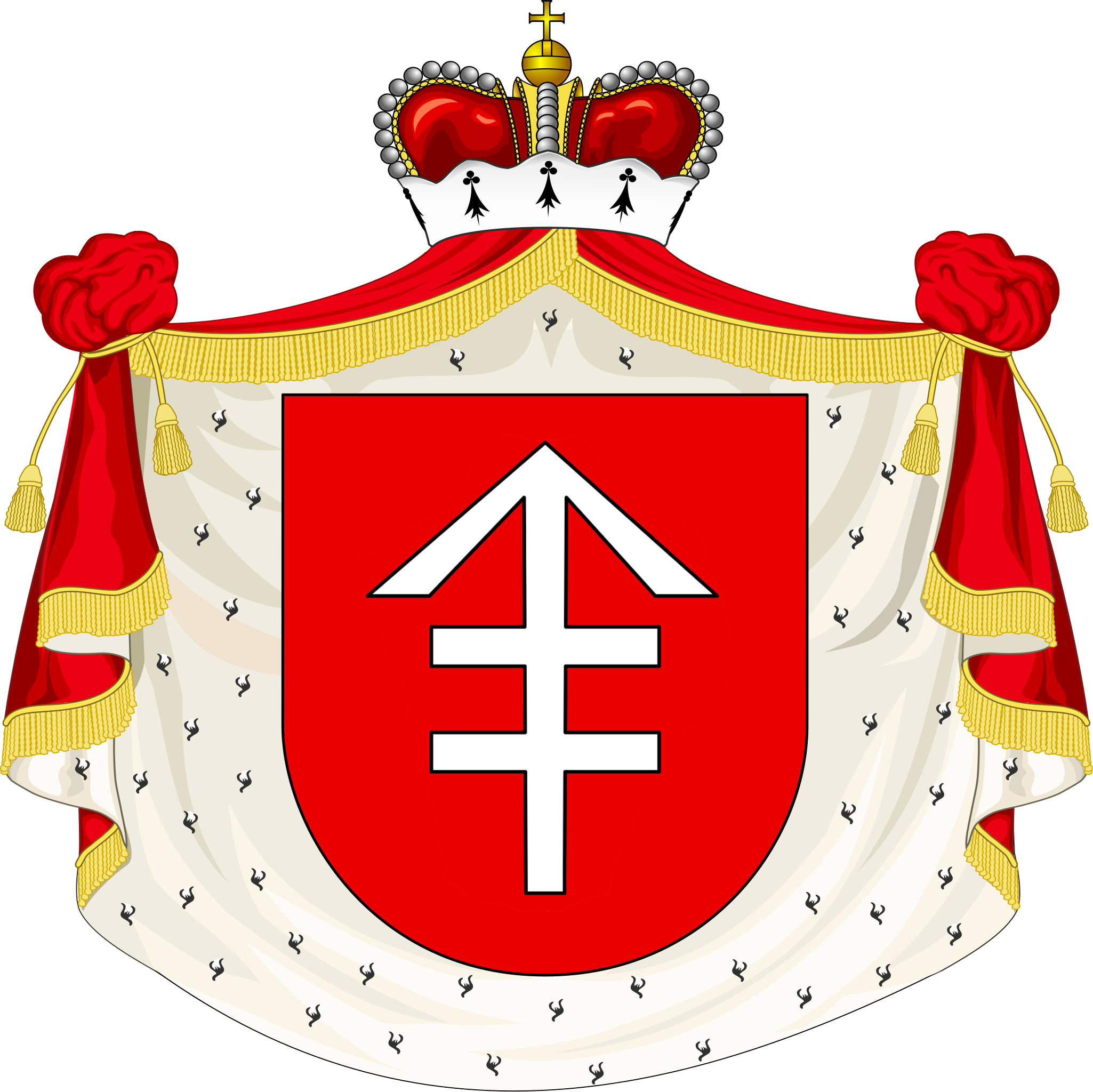
Coat of arms of Sapieha family

Aleksander Michał Paweł Sapieha (Lithuanian: Aleksandras Mykolas Sapiega) of Lis coat of arms (1730 in Wysokie – 1793 in Warsaw) was a noble of the Polish–Lithuanian Commonwealth.

Son of Kazimierz Leon Sapieha and Karolina Teresa Radziwiłł, he married Magdalena Agnieszka Sapieżyna in 1757. A protegee of Józef Stanisław Sapieha, he became the Voivode of Polotsk in 1753, Field Lithuanian Hetman from 1762, Grand Lithuanian Chancellor from 1775, marshal of Lithuanian Tribunal in 1789.

He tried to remain neutral in politics but leaned towards the pro-Russian faction; he neither opposed nor support the Confederation of Bar, a member of the Great Sejm he did not openly criticize or support May Constitution of Poland; however, given his subsequent positioning as marshal of the Targowica Confederation, appointed by Russian Empress Catherine the Great, he had an implied opposition to it.

== Bibliography ==
- Polski Słownik Biograficzny t. 34 s. 565
