= Maurycy Stanisław Potocki =

Polish Army officer

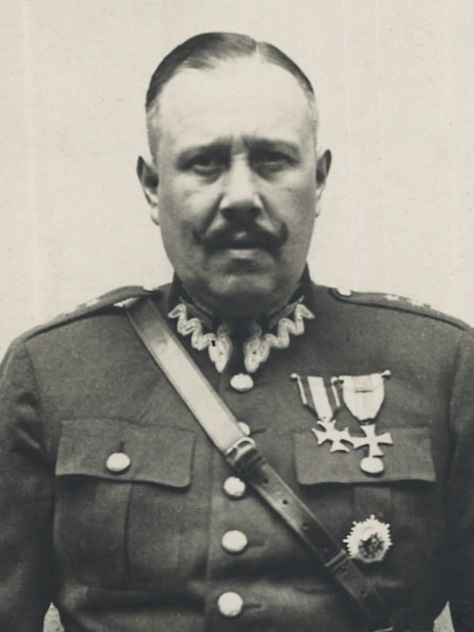
Maurycy Stanisław Potocki, reserve lieutenant, Knight of the Order of Virtuti Militari, 5th class

Count Maurycy Stanisław Potocki (Pilawa coat of arms) was born on May 16, 1894, in his family real estate of Jabłonna near Warsaw, Congress Poland. He was a member of the House of Potocki: his father was August Potocki, and his great-grandfather was Aleksander Stanisław Potocki. Maurycy Stanisław died on May 16, 1949, in London.

In 1906, after the death of his father, young Maurycy inherited the estates of Jabłonna, Nieporęt and Białobrzegi, with total area of 7800 hectares. Before the outbreak of World War I, he studied in England, but failed to complete the studies. During the war, Potocki fought in Polish I Corps in Russia, under General Józef Dowbor-Muśnicki. As a Colonel of 1st Uhlan Regiment, he fought in Polish–Ukrainian War and Polish–Soviet War.

In the Second Polish Republic, Potocki officially stayed away from politics, but was a well-known figure in Warsaw society. He co-created the Polish Automobile Club, participated in car races, and had a collection of race cars. Also, he was a prominent member of the Polish Hunting Association: during hunting trips, Potocki met a number of foreign dignitaries, including Hermann Göring and Count Galeazzo Ciano. In 1926 he presented two paintings by Canaletto to Royal Castle, Warsaw. In 1922, Potocki founded Glass Factory Jablonna, which employed 250 people, and which provided him with the bulk of the income.

In September 1939, during the Invasion of Poland, Potocki was a member of Warsaw's Citizen Guard (Straz Obywatelska), and during the war, with permission of the Home Army, maintained contacts with German officials, based on his prewar relations. He frequently intervened with occupation authorities, asking them for release of Polish activists. After one of such interventions, in August 1942, Władysław Studnicki was freed. A tenement house in Warsaw, which belonged to Potocki, and which housed a restaurant “Za Kotara” was a contact office of the 5th Department of Home Army Headquarters.

After the Warsaw Uprising Potocki went to Ojców near Kraków. In March 1945 he was arrested by Communist Urzad Bezpieczenstwa, and sent to a prison in Kielce. In August 1945, the Kielce prison was captured by a unit of Antoni Heda (see Cursed soldiers), and Potocki was released. In autumn 1945 he illegally left Poland, and settled in London, where he died in 1949.

Potocki was awarded the Virtuti Militari 5th Class, and Cross of Valour (twice). He had two wives: Teresa née Woroniecka (married 1914, divorced 1928), and Maria née Gasiorowska (married 1929), and daughter Natalia, born 1929.

== Sources ==
- Wojciech Roszkowski, Potocki Maurycy Stanisław (1894–1949), właściciel Jabłonny, w: Polski Słownik Biograficzny, tom XXVIII (redaktor naczelny Emanuel Rostworowski), Wrocław 1984–1985
