= Andrzej Zahorski =

Polish historian

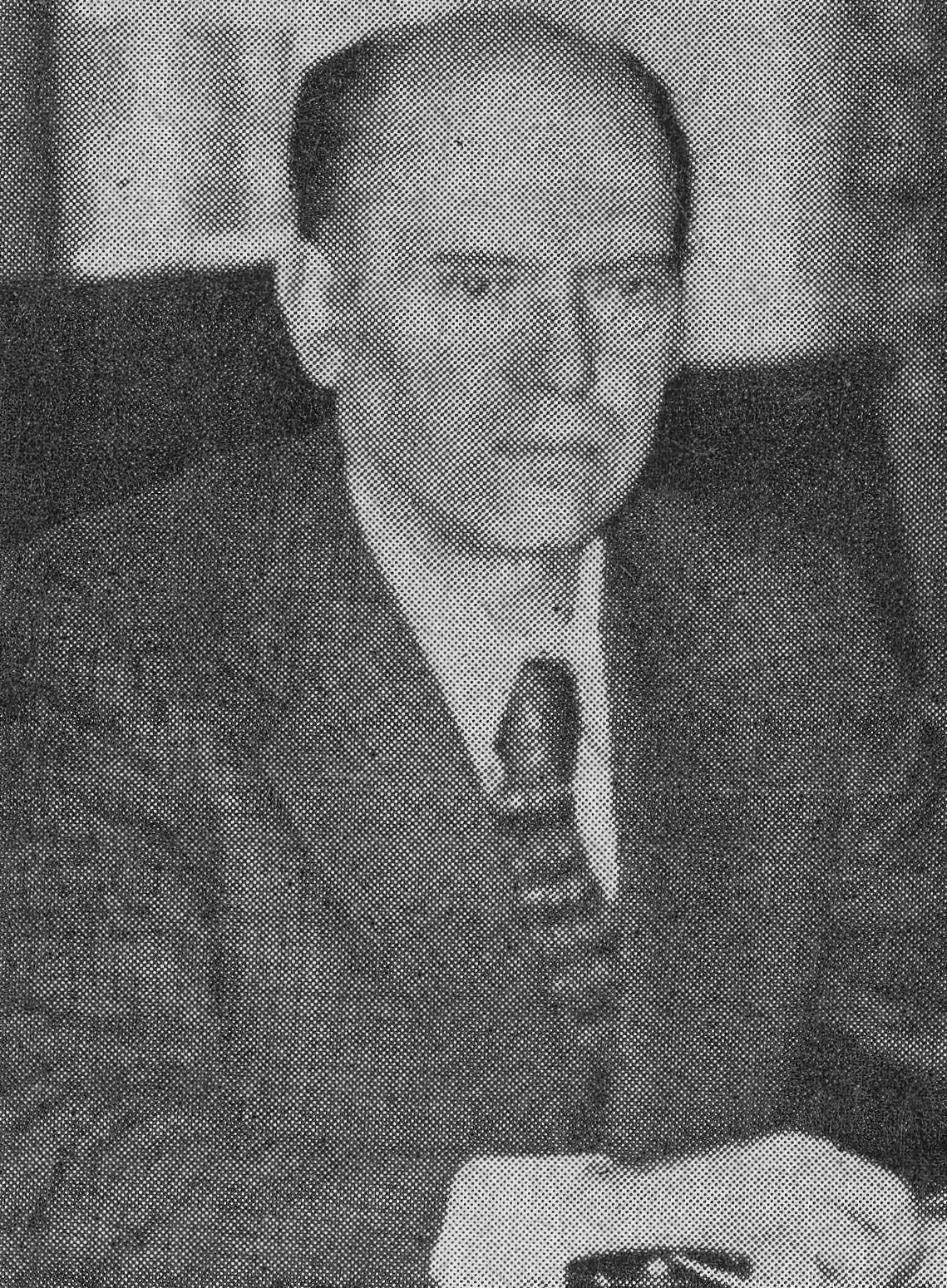
- Andrzej Zahorski
- Born: July 15, 1923; Warsaw
- Died: December 15, 1995 (aged 72); Warsaw
- Known for: Researcher of history of Poland in the 18th century
- Scientific career
- Fields: History
- Workplaces: University of Warsaw

Andrzej Zahorski (July 15, 1923 in Warsaw – December 15, 1995 in Warsaw) was a Polish historian, professor of University of Warsaw, researcher of history of Poland in the 18th century, history of Warsaw and general history of Napoleonic era. He was the chairman of the Polish Historical Society from 1982 to 1988.

== Notable works ==
- Stanisław August polityk (1959)
- Paryż lat rewolucji i Napoleona (1964)
- Warszawa za Sasów i Stanisława Augusta (1970)
- Historia Warszawy (with Marian Drozdowski; ed. Stanisław Herbst) (1972)
- Spór o Napoleona we Francji i w Polsce (1974)
- Napoleon (1982)
- Spór o Stanisława Augusta (1988)
