= Stanisław Salmonowicz =

Polish historian (1931–2022)

- Born: 9 November 1931; Brest
- Died: 24 May 2022 (aged 90); Toruń
- Citizenship: Polish
- Occupation: Historian

Stanisław Salmonowicz (9 November 1931 – 24 May 2022) was a Polish historian, professor of the Nicolaus Copernicus University in Toruń, and a member of the Polish Academy of Learning and History Institute of the Polish Academy of Sciences.

He specialised in the history of law, Polish history from the time of the Polish Enlightenment to World War II, and history of Polish-German relations. He has been described as one of the premier Polish authorities in the field of the history of law.

== Biography ==
Salmonowicz was born on 9 November 1931 in Brzesc nad Bugiem. He got his doctorate in law in 1959 at the University of Warsaw. His thesis was about a city of Toruń lawyer Krystian Bogumił Steiner (1746–1814). In 1959 he began working at the Jagiellonian University, where he finished his habilitation in 1966 with a thesis about criminal law of the enlightened absolutism era. From that year he moved to Nicolaus Copernicus University in Toruń, where he served as the vice dean. In 1970 due to his ties to another historian, Paweł Jasienica, he was arrested for anti-governmental activism by the Polish communist authorities of the People's Republic of Poland and fired from the university in the next year. In 1972 he began work at the History Institute of the Polish Academy of Sciences where he would work until 2003. From 1981 he resumed his work at the University of Toruń. In 1983 he received the rank of special professor (nadzwyczajny) and in 1989, the higher rank of the regular professor (zwyczajny). He has also served as a guest lecturer at a number of universities outside Poland.

Salmonowicz received a medal for "Deeds for City of Toruń" (Za Zasługi dla Miasta Torunia) and the Cross of Freedom and Solidarity in 2012. In 2022, he was awarded an Honorary Doctorate from the Jagiellonian University.

Salmonowicz died in Toruń on 24 May 2022, at the age of 90.

== Selected works ==
Salmonowicz published about 1,200 works, including over 40 books, including a number of textbooks.

- Krystian Bogumił Steiner: 1746-1814: toruński prawnik i historyk: studium z dziejów nauki prawa doby Oświecenia w Polsce (1962)
- Francja pod jakobińską gwiazdą: szkice z dziejów rewolucji francuskiej (1966)
- Prawo karne oświeconego absolutyzmu: z dziejów kodyfikacji karnych przełomu XVIII-XIX w. (1966)
- Toruńskie Gimnazjum Akademickie w latach 1681-1817. Studium z dziejów nauki i oświaty (1973)
- O reglamentacji obyczajowości mieszczańskiej w Toruniu w XVI - XVIII wieku (1976)
- Obrońcy i miłośnicy języka polskiego w Toruniu XVI-XVIII w. (1979)
- Fryderyk II (1981, ISBN 8304007908)
- Myśl Oświecenia w Toruniu (1982)
- Toruń w czasach baroku i oświecenia: szkice z dziejów kultury Torunia XVII-XVIII wieku (1982, ISBN 8301041595)
- Konfederacja warszawska 1573 (1985, ISBN 8300009957)
- Prusy: dzieje państwa i społeczeństwa (1987, ISBN 8321007147)
- Ludzie i dzieło Sejmu Czteroletniego (1988)
- Sylwetki spod gilotyny (1989, ISBN 8301090243)
- Ludwik Muzyczka 1900-1977: polityk i żołnierz: przyczynek do dziejów Armii Krajowej (1992, ISBN 8390032945)
- Od Prus Książęcych do Królestwa Pruskiego: studia z dziejów prusko-pomorskich (1992)
- Szkice toruńskie XVII-XVIII wieku (1992, ISBN 838519634X)
- Polacy i Niemcy wobec siebie : postawy, opinie, stereotypy (1697-1815): próba zarysu (1993)
- Wokół listu 34 (1994)
- Polskie Państwo Podziemne: z dziejów walki cywilnej 1939-45 (1994, ISBN 830205500X)
- Historia ustroju Polski (1995, with Ryszard Łaszewski, ISBN 8385709614)
- Studia historycznoprawne (1995, ISBN 8323106800)
- O rzemiośle recenzenta : studia z warsztatu historyka (1999, ISBN 8386301791)
- Polski wiek XX: studia i szkice (2000, ISBN 8388500031)
- Z wieku oświecenia: studia z dziejów prawa i polityki XVIII wieku (2001, ISBN 8323113319)
- Historia ustrojów państw (2001, with Grzegorz Górski, ISBN 8388296736)
- Prusy Królewskie w XVII-XVIII wieku : studia z dziejów kultury (2002, ISBN 8323114625)
- Niewesołe lata 1939-1989: szkice z Polski dziejów najnowszych (2005, ISBN 8389416611)
- W staropolskim Toruniu (XVI-XVIII w.): studia i szkice (2005, ISBN 8372852340)
- Kilka minionych wieków: szkice i studia z historii ustroju Polski (2009, ISBN 9788324209811)
- Studia z historii prawa (XVI-XX wiek) (2010, ISBN 9788389914293)
- „Życie jak osioł ucieka…” Wspomnienia (2014, ISBN 978-83-7629-448-3)
- Polnische Preussen oder Westpreussen. Ausgewählte Studien (2018, ISBN 978-83-65826-14-5
