= Jerzy Łojek =

Polish historian and activist (1932–1986)

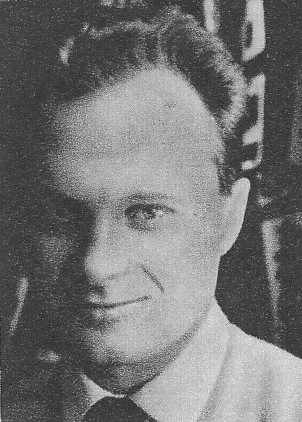
- Portrait of Łojek, c.1960s
- Born: Jerzy Adam Łojek; September 3, 1932; Warsaw, Warsaw Voivodeship, Second Polish Republic
- Died: October 7, 1986 (aged 54); Warsaw, Warsaw Capital Voivodeship, Polish People's Republic
- Resting place: Powązki Cemetery
- Education: University of Warsaw
- Spouse: Bożena Mamontowicz-Łojek

Jerzy Łojek (3 September 1932 – 7 October 1986) was a Polish historian and opposition activist in the People's Republic of Poland. He specialized in European, Polish and Russian history of the 17th to 20th centuries. Some of his works were first published underground. The communist government prevented him from receiving a professorship.

His wife was the historian Bożena Mamontowicz-Łojek, who served as President of the Polish Katyn Foundation.

== Key works ==
- Szanse powstania listopadowego (transl. The Chances of the November Uprising)
- Dzieje pięknej Bitynki (transl. The History of Beautiful Bitina)
- Agresja 17 września 1939. Studium aspektów politycznych (transl. The Aggression of September 17, 1939: A Study of Political Aspects)
- Dzieje sprawy Katynia (transl. The History of the Katyn Affair)
- Ku naprawie Rzeczypospolitej. Konstytucja 3 maja (transl. Towards the Reconstruction of the Republic: The Constitution of May)
- Paweł Janowski, Łojek Jerzy, 1932-1986, historyk, publicysta, [w:] Encyklopedia Katolicka, Lublin 2006, t. XI, kol. 493.
