= Walewska =

Walewska may refer to:

- Walewska Oliveira (1979–2023), Brazilian volleyball player
- Małgorzata Walewska (born 1965), Polish opera singer
- Marie Walewska (1786–1817), Polish noblewoman and a mistress of Napoleon
- Marie-Anne Walewska (1823–1912), French courtier and a mistress of Napoleon III
- Countess Walewska (1914 film), a Polish historical film
- Countess Walewska (1920 film), a German silent historical film
