= Stanisław Poniatowski =

Stanisław Poniatowski was the name of several Polish nobles:

- Stanisław Poniatowski (1676–1762), castellan of Kraków
- Stanisław August Poniatowski (1732–1798), last King of Poland and Grand Duke of Lithuania
- Stanisław Poniatowski (1754–1833), Grand Treasurer of Lithuania
