= Konstancja Poniatowska =

Polish noblewoman (1759–1830)

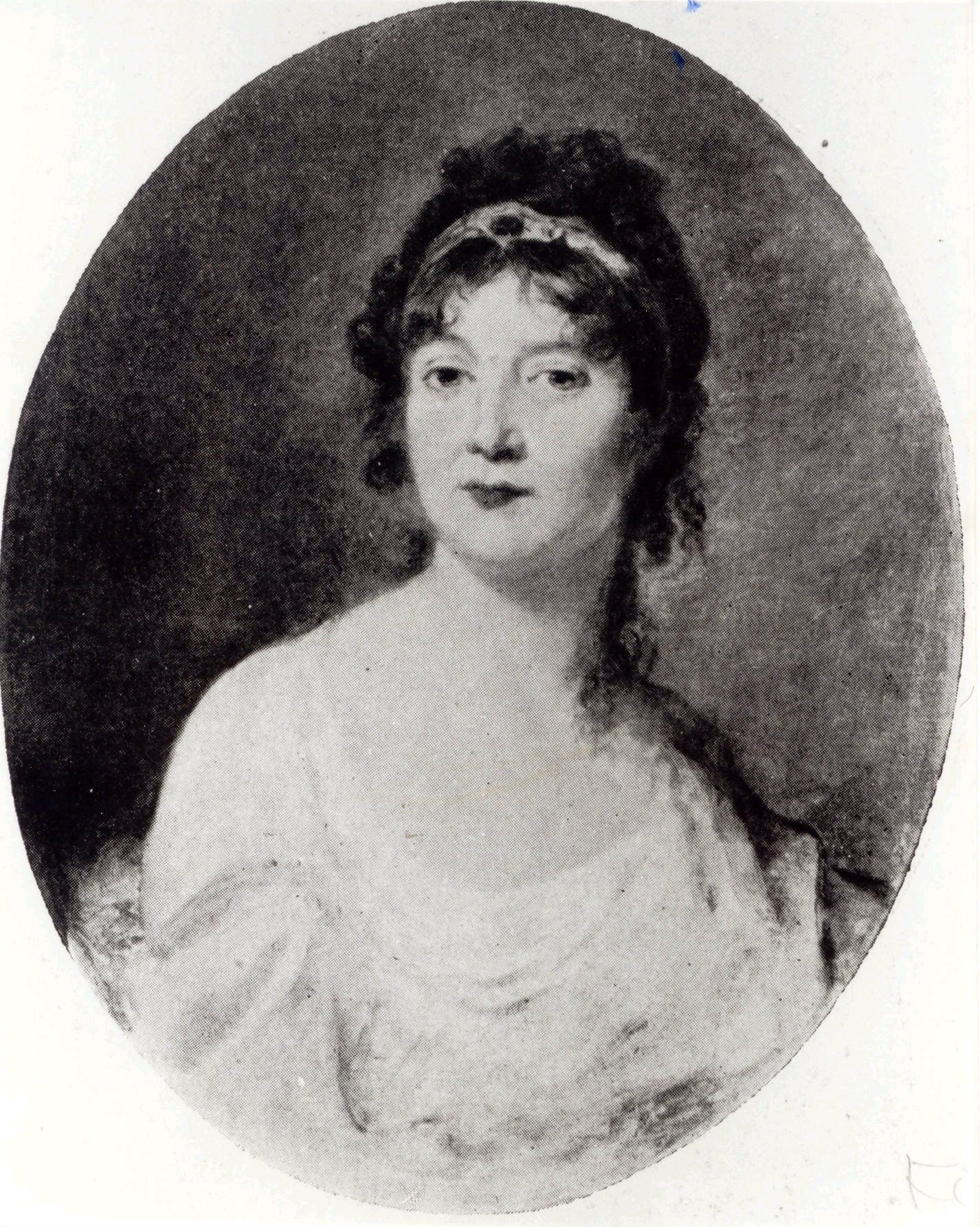
- Portrait by Marcello Bacciarelli, c. 1795
- Full name: Konstancja Poniatowska
- Born: 2 March 1759; Warsaw, Poland
- Died: 1830 (aged 70–71); Paris, France
- Noble family: Poniatowski
- Spouse: Ludwik Skumin Tyszkiewicz
- Issue: Anna Tyszkiewicz
- Father: Kazimierz Poniatowski
- Mother: Apolonia Ustrzycka

Princess Konstancja Poniatowska (1759–1830) was a Polish noblewoman from the House of Poniatowski. She was also the niece of King Stanisław August Poniatowski.

Konstancja Poniatowska was born on 2 March 1759 in Warsaw, Poland. She was the only daughter of Kazimierz Poniatowski and his wife; Apolonia Ustrzycka. Konstancja had an elder brother, Stanisław Poniatowski (1754–1833). Konstancja later married Ludwik Skumin Tyszkiewicz on 4 April 1775. Konstancja was a close friend of the French Minister of Foreign Affairs, Charles Maurice de Talleyrand-Périgord.

On 26 March 1779 Konstancja gave birth to Anna Tyszkiewicz. She was the only child of the couple.

== Ancestry ==
Ancestors of Konstancja Poniatowska

8. Franciszek Poniatowski
4. Stanisław Poniatowski (1676–1762)
9. Helena Niewiarowska
2. Kazimierz Poniatowski
10. Kazimierz Czartoryski
5. Konstancja Czartoryska (1700–1759)
11. Izabela Elżbieta Morsztyn
1. Konstancja Poniatowska
6. Bazyli Ustrzycki
3. Apolonia Ustrzycka
14. Jan Dzierżek
7. Katarzyna Zielonka
15. Katarzyna Gołocka
