= Marie-Anne Walewska =

French noble

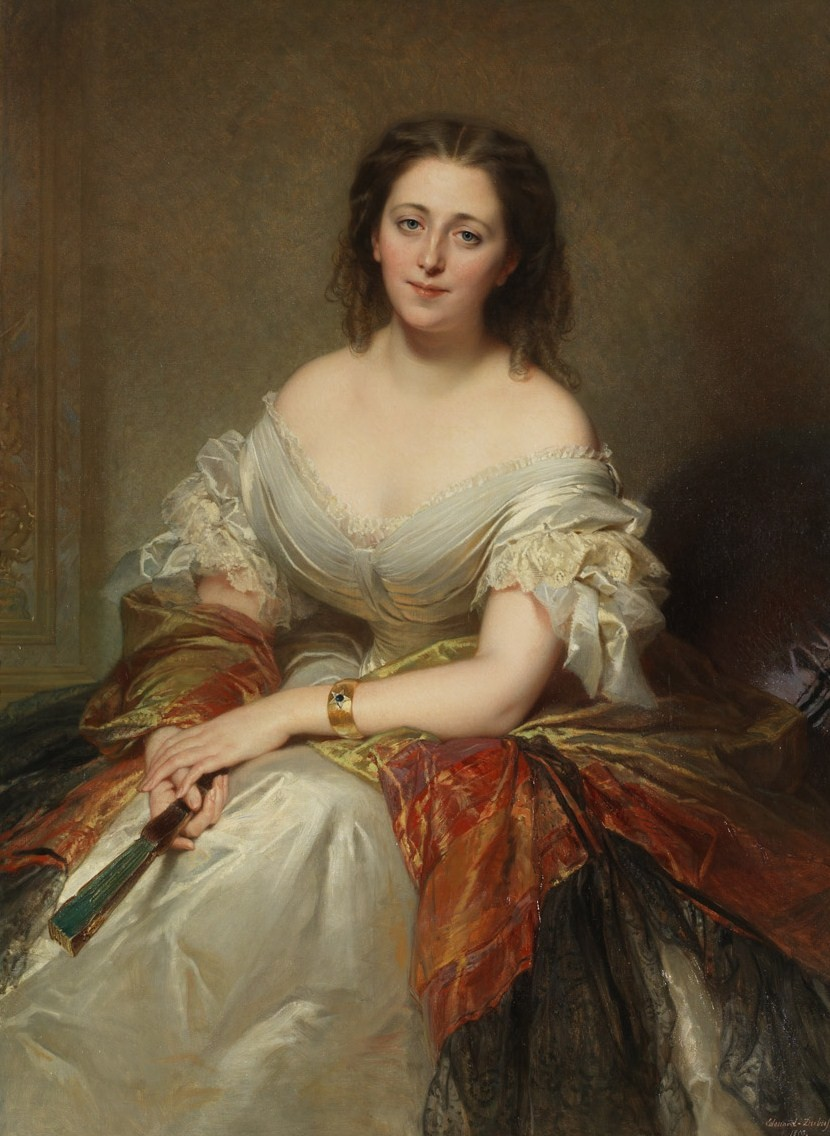
Marie-Anne Walewska

Marie-Anne Walewska, Duchess Colonna-Walewski, (née di Ricci; 18 July 1823 – 18 November 1912), was a French courtier and royal mistress. She served as Première dame d'honneur to Empress Eugénie de Montijo in 1868–1870, and was the last to perform this function in France. She is also known for her relationship to Emperor Napoleon III of France in 1857–1861.

== Life ==
She was born to the Papal Count Zanobi di Ricci and Princess Isabelle Poniatowski-Luci (illegitimate daughter of the last King of Poland's nephew).

On 4 June 1846, she became the second wife of the Polish Count (later Duke) Alexandre Colonna-Walewski (4 May 1810 – 27 September 1868), the illegitimate son of Napoleon and his mistress, Countess Marie Walewska, and a Minister of the French Cabinet during the Second Empire.

She was described as an elegant and intelligent blonde beauty and was a leading member of the high society of Second Empire Paris. While her spouse was described as well respected, but too reserved to be popular in society, she "greatly assisted him in retaining some popularity", and it was said that

Every one was attracted by the Comtesse Walewska, who never lost an opportunity of doing a kind act, or of obliging others in those small things of daily life which are so pleasing and so valuable. She was also quiet and ladylike. Her beauty was much extolled, but this seemed more due to a general impression of a very charming and most agreeable woman, than to real beauty taken in a literal sense. Lord Malmesbury considered her to be the only woman in the company of the Empress who was not vulgar, and Bismarck described her as the most entertaining woman in France after the empress.

Her two daughters, along with the nieces of the empress and the son of Doctor Conneau, were the main playmates of the Imperial Prince.

=== Royal mistress ===
In July 1857, Walewska was reported to have replaced Virginia Oldoini, Countess of Castiglione, as the main lover of the Emperor. In parallel, she was a member of the private circle of the Empress, who reportedly refused to let the affair affect their relationship. When she began the affair with the Emperor, Marie-Anne Walewska openly stated to the Empress that it would no longer be seen proper for her to be invited to the private functions of the Empress because rumours had put it about that she was the mistress of the Emperor, and that she refused to allow it to affect their friendship. In reply, Eugenie embraced her, kissed her and made clear that the "rumour" would affect nothing. Her husband was granted a property in Landes by the Emperor in return for pretending not to notice the affair.

The relationship between the Emperor and Walewska was well known and attracted attention in diplomatic reports, and she herself alluded to it, possibly to give the impression that she had influence upon affairs of state. The relationship with the Emperor was not exclusive. In January 1858, it was reported that the Emperor had sex with every woman at court who initiated it, and during 1859, he had a somewhat more serious affair with Clothilde de La Bédoyère. However, none of the rivals of Marie-Anne Walewska managed to become more than temporary affairs, and she remained the main lover of the Emperor for four years. During the Emperor's infidelity with her, Walewska caused some scenes which attracted attention.

In November 1861, the relationship was noted to be discontinued. Her husband was reportedly displeased because he had come to rely upon it as a valuable channel of influence to the Emperor which could be of use to him.

=== Later life ===
In 1868, Walewska was appointed to the office of Première dame d'honneur to the Empress after the death of her predecessor Pauline de Bassano. She was the last person to hold the office, as it was abolished in 1870 with the end of the Empire.

In 1879, she attended the burial of the son of Eugenie in Great Britain.

== Ancestry ==
Ancestors of Marie-Anne Walewska

2. Count Zanobi di Ricci
1. Countess Maria Anna di Ricci
12. Prince Kazimierz Poniatowski
6. Prince Stanisław Poniatowski
13. Apolonia Ustrzycka
3. Princess Isabella Poniatowska
7. Cassandra Luci

Court offices
Preceded by Pauline de Bassano	Première dame d'honneur 1868–1870	Succeeded by None; office abolished.
