= Stanisław Poniatowski (1754–1833) =

Polish nobleman and politician

His Grace Prince Stanisław Poniatowski
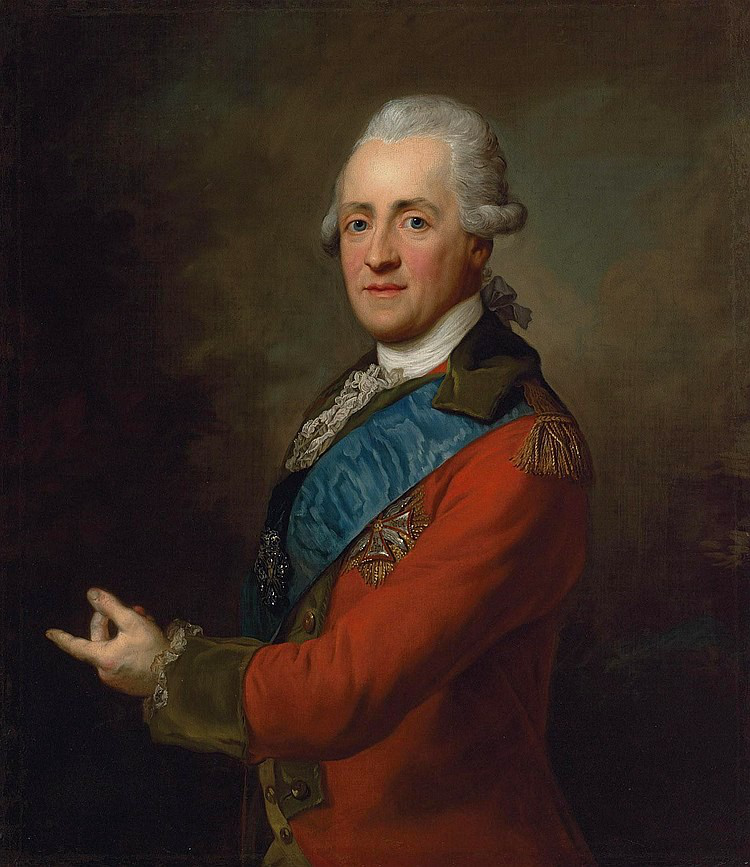
- Portrait by Johann Baptist von Lampi the Elder

Grand Treasurer of Lithuania
- In office 1784–1791
- Monarch: Stanisław II Augustus
- Preceded by: Michał Brzostowski
- Succeeded by: Ludwik Skumin Tyszkiewicz

Personal details
- Born: November 23, 1754 Warsaw, Polish–Lithuanian Commonwealth
- Died: February 13, 1833 (aged 78) Florence, Grand Duchy of Tuscany
- Spouse: Cassandra Luci
- Children: Józef Michał Poniatowski
- Parents: Kazimierz Poniatowski (father); Apolonia Ustrzycka (mother)
- Relatives: Poniatowski

Prince Stanisław Poniatowski (November 23, 1754 – February 13, 1833) was a Polish nobleman, politician, diplomat, a member of the wealthy Poniatowski family and a nephew of the last king of Poland, Stanisław II Augustus. He was the official Commander of the Royal Foot Guards regiment directly responsible for the monarch's life as well as the Grand Treasurer of the Grand Duchy of Lithuania (1784–1791) and Governor of Stryj, which made him a key figure in Poland during the Age of Enlightenment.

== Early life ==
Stanisław was the son of Apolonia Ustrzycka and Polish Prince Kazimierz Poniatowski (1721–1800). His mother, a daughter of Bazyli Ustrzycki, castellan of Przemyśl, was the widow of Prince Antoni Lubomirski. His father was Deputy Chamberlain of Lithuania (1742–1773), Commander of the Royal Army and a knight of the prestigious Order of the White Eagle, awarded on August 3, 1744 in Warsaw. His father was the brother of the last King of Poland and Grand Duke of Lithuania, Stanisław II Augustus, who saw in his nephew a possible successor and heir to the throne of the Polish–Lithuanian Commonwealth. Both Kazimierz and the monarch had been born to Konstancja Czartoryska, (1700–1759), related by marriage to a russophilic Polish–Lithuanian family, the Czartoryskis.

== Career ==
Poniatowski became a knight of the White Eagle on December 8, 1773. Very well educated and particularly interested in the finances and economy of the country as well as in the arts, Poniatowski was not popular amongst szlachta (the Polish nobility), who found him arrogant and competitive.

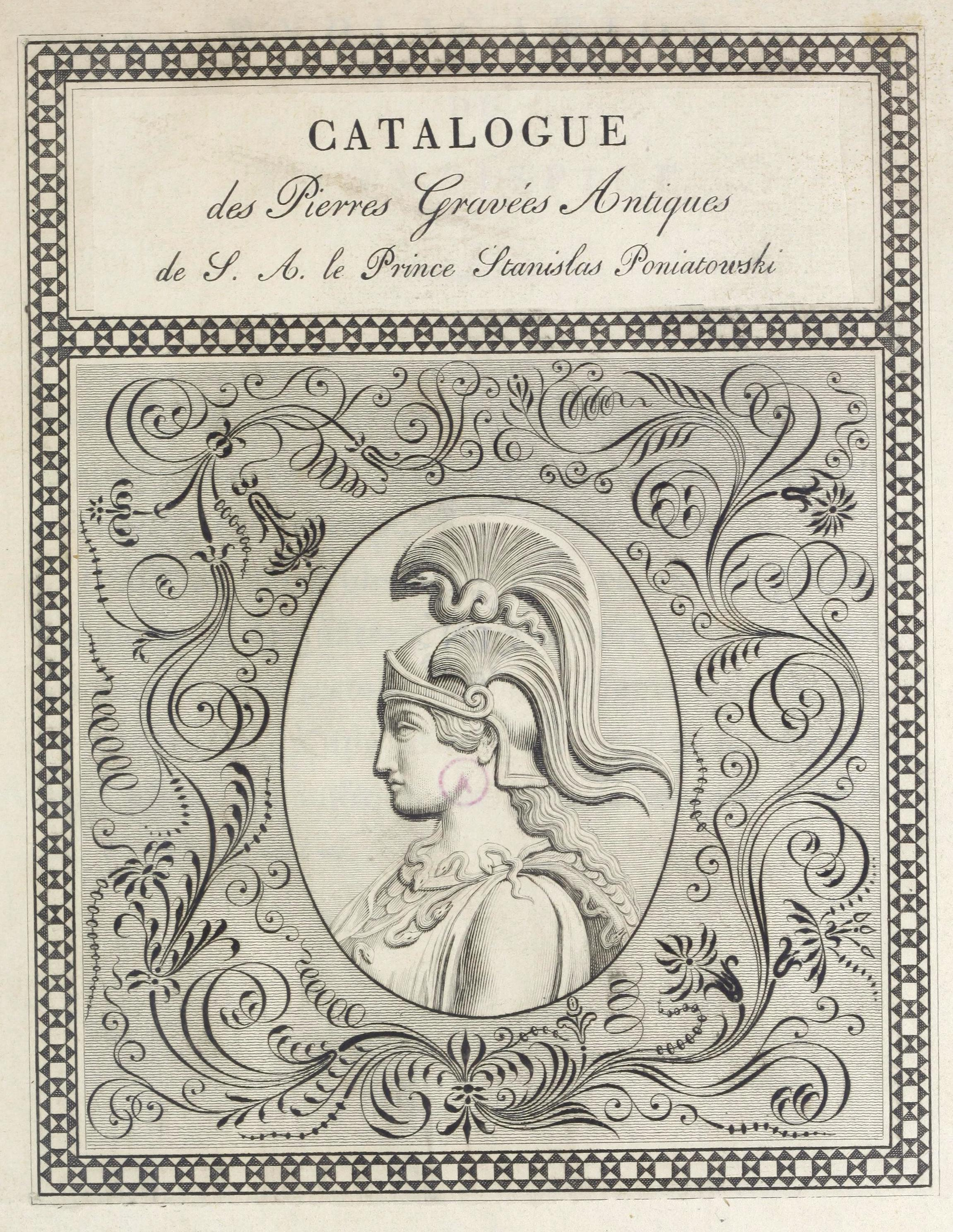
Frontispiece of Poniatowski's catalog, showing Minerva

Poniatowski commissioned about 2500 engraved gems from a group of gem-engravers in Rome who turned to classical literature for inspiration. In 1830, Poniatowski published a summary catalogue of his gems, Catalogue des Pierres Gravees Antiques de S.A. le Prince Stanislas Poniatowski, which contained elaborate descriptions. The collection of Poniatowski gems was sold at a Christie's auction in 1839 and has been dispersed ever since.

Following the partitions of Poland, Poniatowski emigrated to Italy, living first in Rome, then in Florence. He is the ancestor of the present members of the Poniatowski family bearing the title of Fürst Poniatowski or Principe Poniatowski di Monterotondo.

== Personal life ==
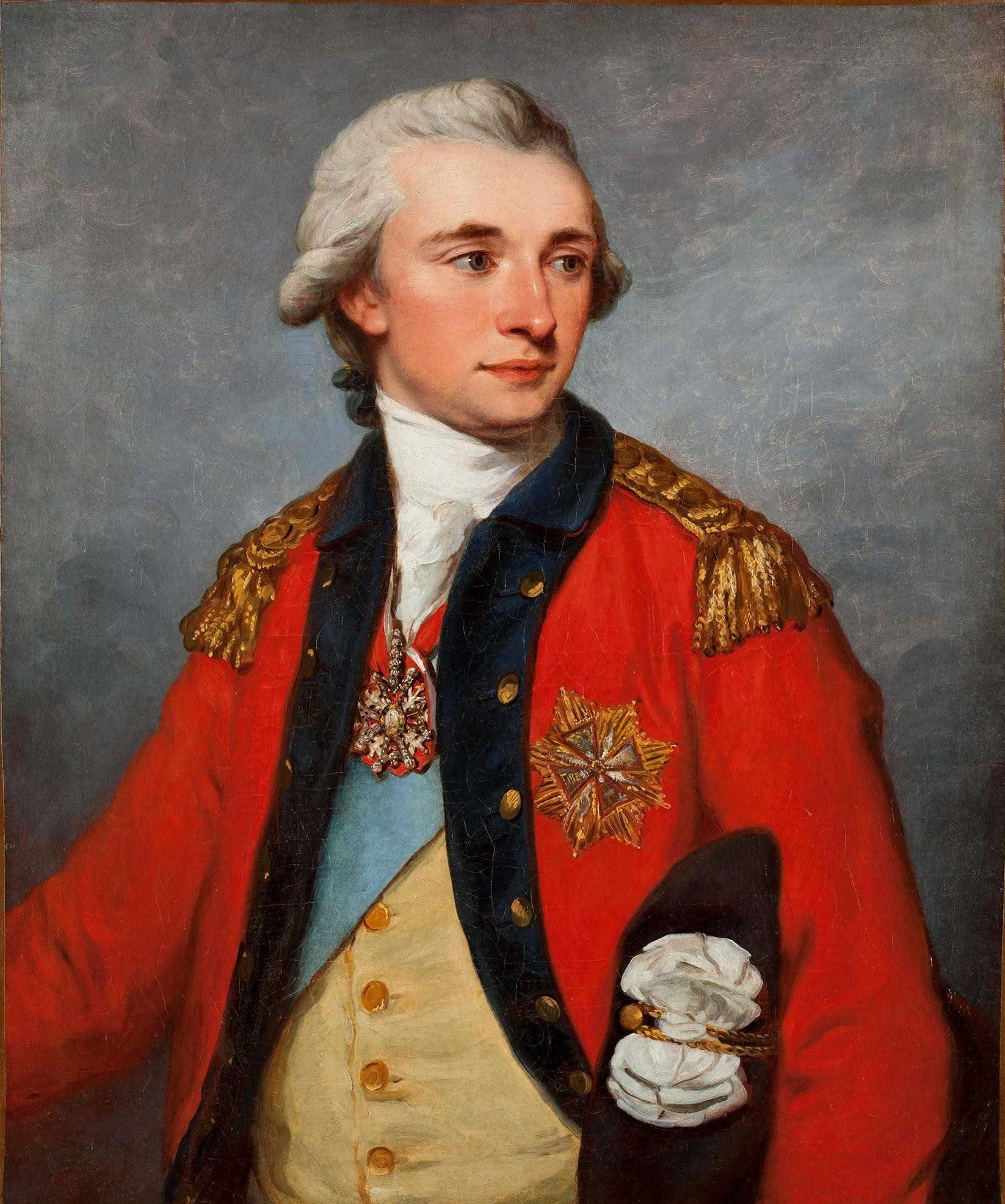
Portrait of Stanisław Poniatowski, by Angelica Kauffman, 1786

While some sources state that he married Cassandra Luci (Rome, 1785 - Florence, 1863) in 1806, it is unlikely because she was already married to Vicenzo Venturini Benloch. Together, Cassandra and Stanisław were the parents of:

- Isabella Luci (Rome, 1806 - Florence, 1896), married firstly in January/February 1821 to Count Prospero Bentivoglio (- 1821), without children, and secondly in 1822 to Count Zanobi di Ricci (- October 16, 1844), their daughter was Marie-Anne Walewska. Then, she married Marquess Filippo De Piccolellis.
- Carlo Luci (Rome, 1808 - Florence, 1887), later Poniatowski, legitimized in 1847, made Conte di Monterotondo by the Grand Duke of Tuscany on November 20, 1847, Principe di Monterotondo by the Grand Duke of Tuscany and Prince Poniatowski by the Emperor of Austria both on November 19, 1850 (Rome, August 4, 1808 - San Pancrazio, July 23, 1887), married in Florence, September 21, 1831 to Elisa Napoleone Montecatini (Lucca, November 4, 1808 - Lucca, April 18, 1893), without children.
- Costanza Luci (Rome, 1811 - Florence, 1851), married to Count Daniele Zappi.
- Giuseppe Michele Saverio Francesco Giovanni Luci(Rome, February 21, 1816 - London, July 4, 1873), later known as Józef Michał Poniatowski, legitimized in 1847, made Conte di Monterotondo by the Grand Duke of Tuscany on November 20, 1847, Principe di Monterotondo by the Grand Duke of Tuscany and Prince Poniatowski by the Emperor of Austria both on November 19, 1850. He was a composer and a singer, and was sent to Paris as plenipotentiary by Grand Duke of Tuscany Leopold II. In 1834, he married Countess Matilda Perotti (1814 - February 1875) in Florence, and they had one son, Stanislaus August Friedrich Joseph Telemach Luci.
- Michele Luci (Rome, 1816 - Florence, 1864), founder of Imparziale fiorentino.

=== Descendants ===
Among his descendants are the Princes Poniatowski of the Empire of Austria and Counts and the Princes of Monterotondo in the Grand Duchy of Tuscany

== Gallery ==
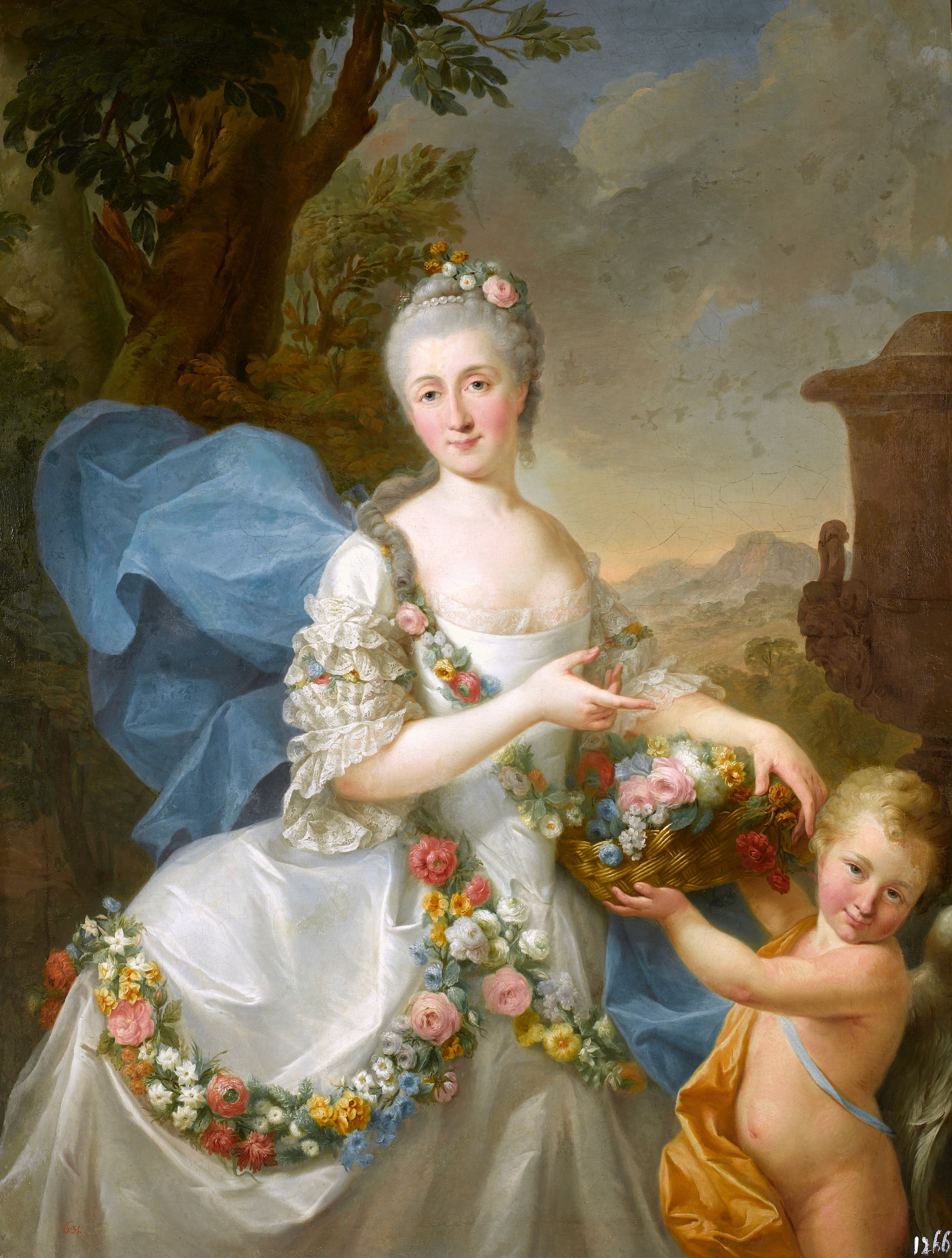
Apolonia Ustrzycka and her son, by Marcello Bacciarelli

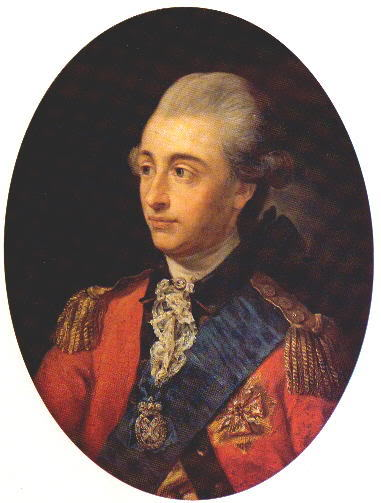
Prince Stanisław Poniatowski

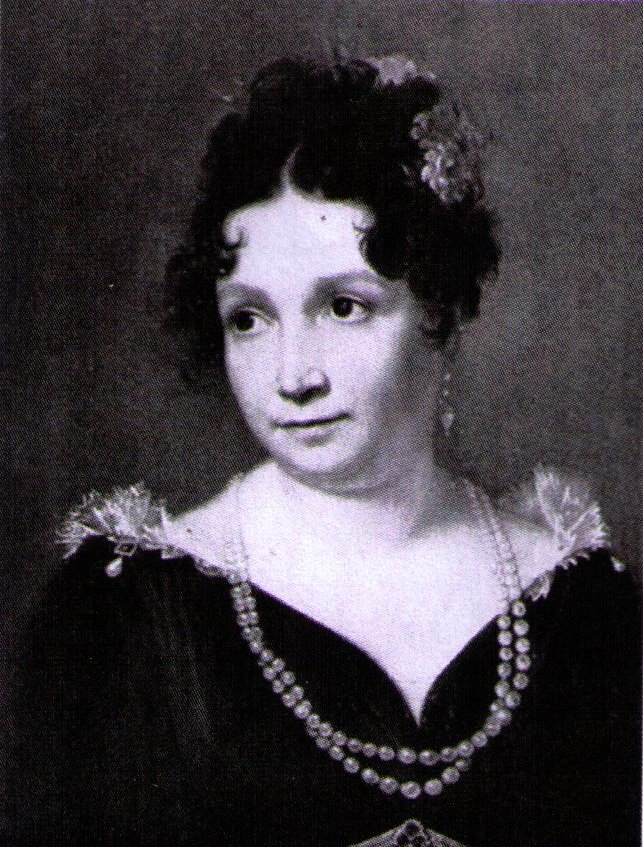
Cassandra Luci

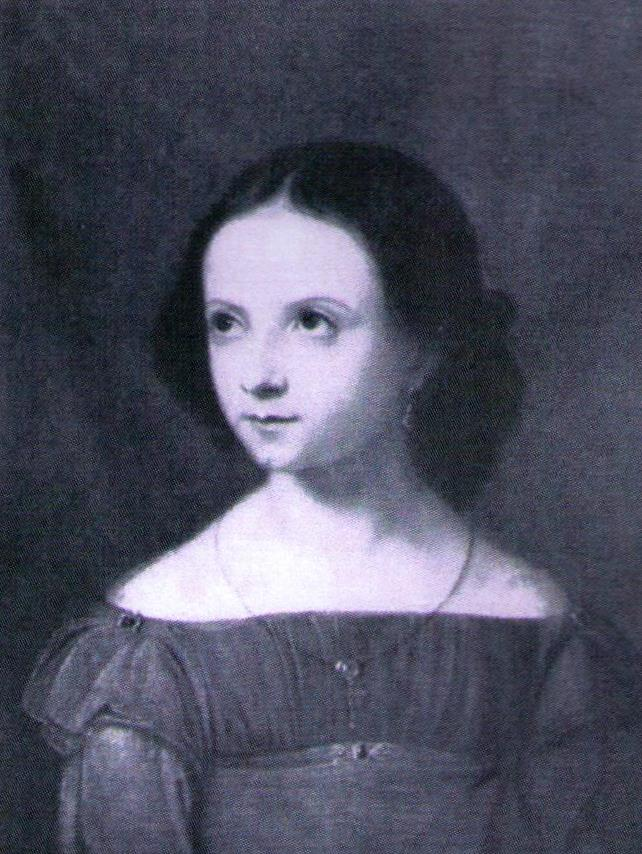
Costanza Luci

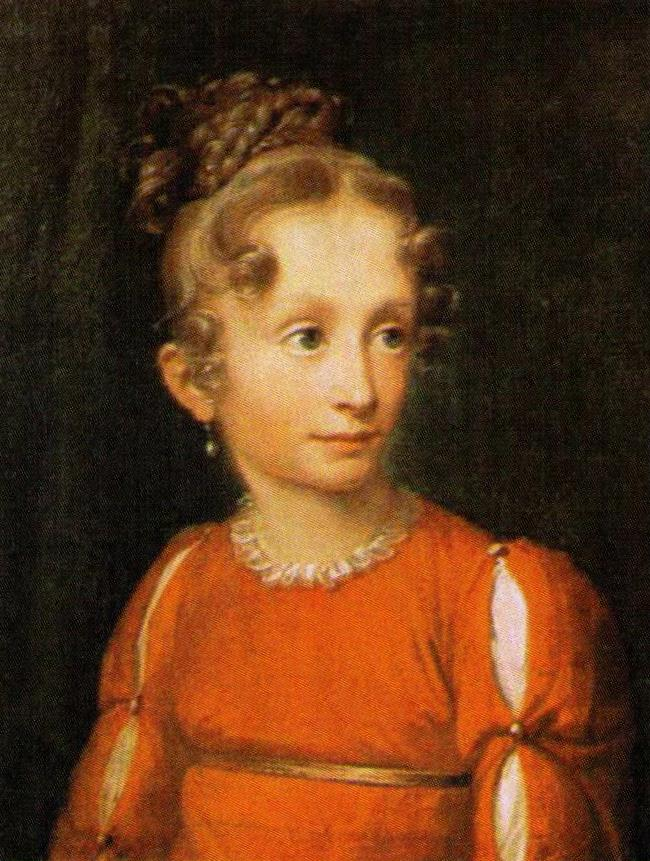
Isabella Luci

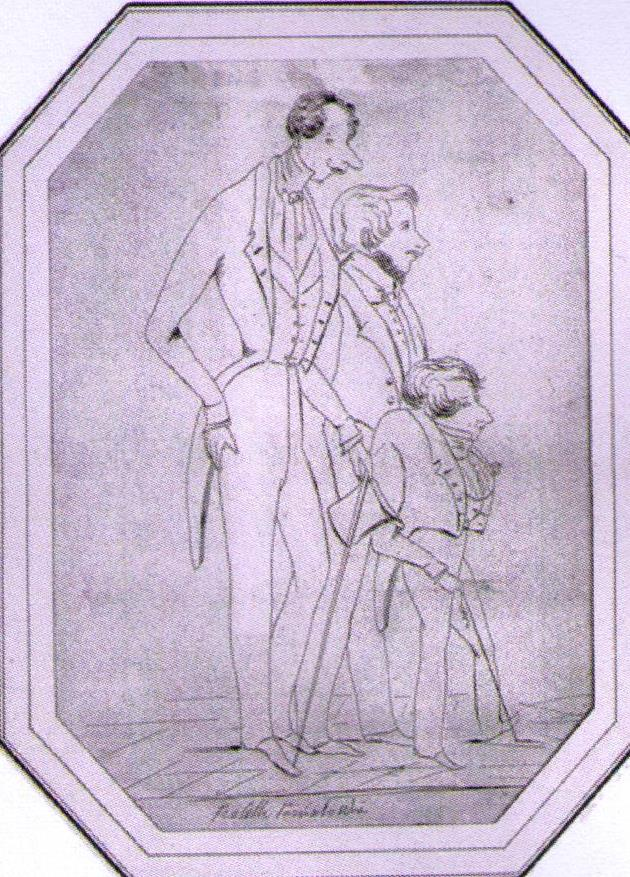
Carlo, Giuseppe and Michele Luci-Poniatowski

== Bibliography ==
- AA.VV, Polonia-Italia: relazioni artistiche dal medioevo al XVIII secolo, Polska Akademia Nauk Stacja Naukowa w Rzymie, Zakład Narodowy imienia Ossolińskich, 1979
- The Encyclopædia Britannica: a dictionary of arts, sciences, literature and general information, Vol. 22, 1911, p. 61.
- Jerzy Jan Lerski; Piotr Wróbel; Richard J. Kozicki (1996). Historical Dictionary of Poland, 966–1945. Greenwood Publishing. p. 464.
