= Apolonia Ustrzycka =

Polish noblewoman (1736–1814)

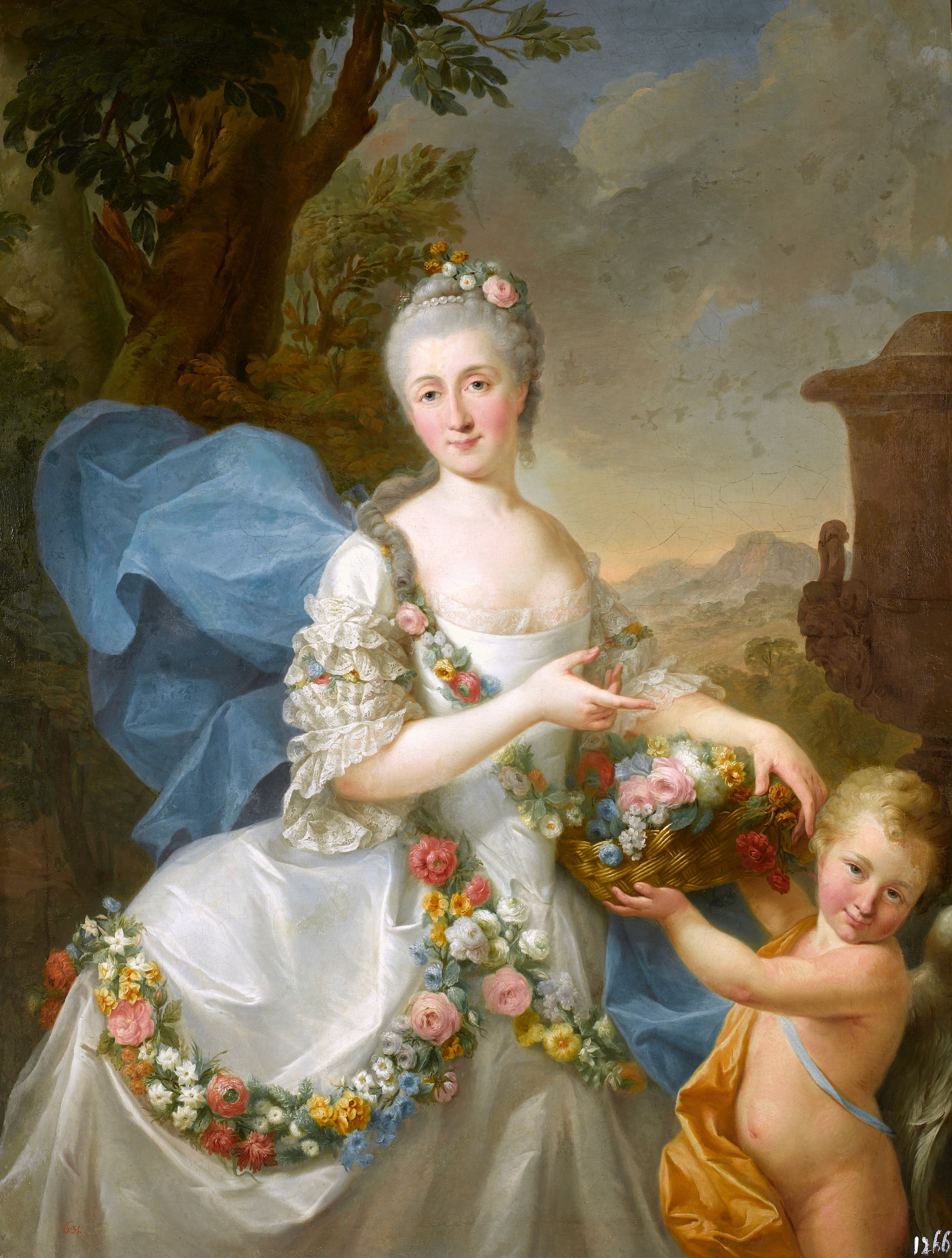
- Coat of arms: Przestrzał
- Full name: Apolonia Ustrzycka herbu Przestrzał
- Born: 17 January 1736; Przemyśl
- Died: 1814 (aged 77–78) unknown
- Noble family: Ustrzycki; Lubomirski (by marriage); Poniatowski (by marriage)
- Spouses: Antoni Lubomirski; Kazimierz Poniatowski
- Issue: Stanisław Poniatowski; Konstancja Poniatowska; Katarzyna Poniatowska
- Father: Bazyli Ustrzycki
- Mother: Katarzyna Zielonka

Princess Apolonia Poniatowski (17 January 1736 – 1814) was a Polish noblewoman, the sister-in-law of the King of Poland, Stanisław August Poniatowski.

== Biography ==
She was the daughter of Bazyli Ustrzycki (1715-1751), castellan of Przemyśl and his second wife, Katarzyna Zielonka (b.1715). She married Prince Antoni Lubomirski in 1749, and Prince Kazimierz Poniatowski on 21 January 1751.

In 1763, her brother-in-law was elected king of Poland. She became the mother of Stanisław, Grand Treasurer of Lithuania, and Konstancja Poniatowska.

Her second marriage was unhappy. Her husband was known for his love life and was famously one of the clients of Henrietta Lullier.
