= Andrzej Ćwierz =

Polish politician (born 1947)

member of Sejm 2005-2007
- Incumbent
- Assumed office 25 September 2005

Personal details
- Born: 20 August 1947 (age 78) Przeworsk
- Party: Law and Justice

Andrzej Bogusław Ćwierz (born 20 August 1947) is a Polish politician. He was elected to Sejm on 25 September 2005, getting 6161 votes in 22 Krosno district as a candidate from the Law and Justice list.

== See also ==
- Members of Polish Sejm 2005-2007
