= Henrietta Lullier =

French fortune teller and procurer (1716–1802)

Henrietta Zofia z Puszetów Lullier (c. 1716 – 22 December 1802, Warsaw) was a French fortune teller and procurer. She was the influential and controversial favorite of king Stanisław August Poniatowski of Poland and his brother Kazimierz Poniatowski.

== Life ==
Henrietta Lullier was born in France to Benedict Puszet and Barbara Euhinger. She had a good education in science and was possibly educated in Lunéville. In 1753, she was reportedly the mistress of Stanisław August Poniatowski during his visit to Paris. According to legend, she predicted to him that he would one day wear a crown. In 1754, she married Augustus Louis Lullier, who was employed in the court of Augustus III of Poland, and settled with him in Poland. She resumed her contact with Poniatowski, who was elected king of Poland in 1763.

During the reign of Stanisław August Poniatowski, she was a favorite of both the monarch and his brother, Kazimierz Poniatowski. She was the confidante of the king, who entrusted her to handle his love affairs. In 1765, the king's brother bought her a house, in which she hosted a brothel fashionable for the libertins, with the king as one of the clients. She was also of use to the king as a diplomatic agent after having established connections with the Russian diplomat Nicholas Repnin and the Prussian diplomat Gédéon Benoît, and was entrusted by the king to handle unofficial political negotiations. In gratitude for her service, the king granted her an allowance. In 1771–1773, she made trips to Vienna, Paris and Spa and established influential international contacts. Upon her return in 1773, the king granted her the Eremitage villa in the royal Łazienki Park. She visited the king a last time in 1796, when he was imprisoned by the Russians in Grodno. She lived out her life in the Eremitage villa.

Lullier was infamous in 18th-century Poland, where she was regarded as a symbol of decadence and corruption and a center of political plots, and she became the target of several libels from the 1760s onward, such as the O zapobieżeniu nierządów w Warszawie(1782).
