= Przeworsk =

- Market Town
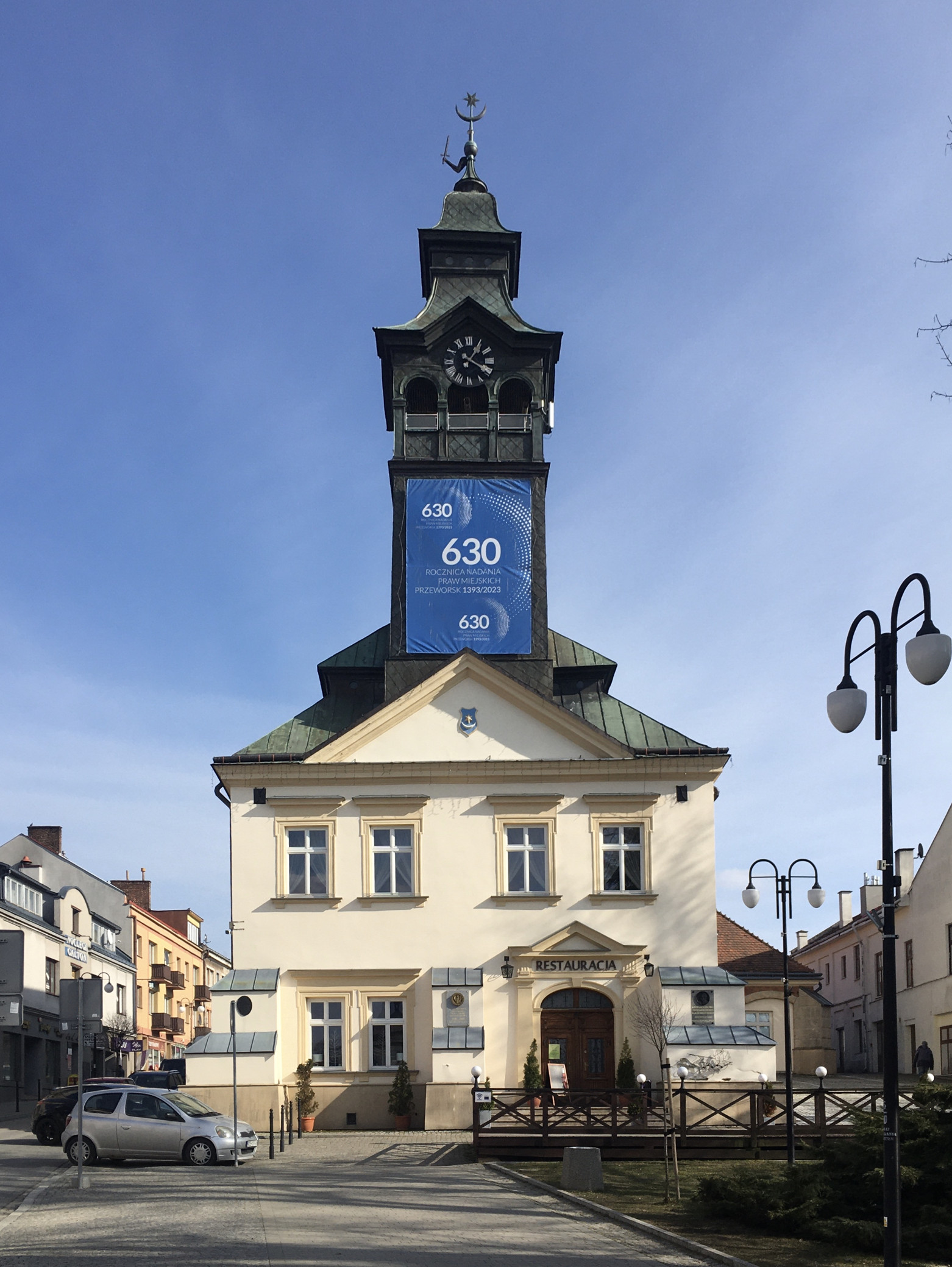
- Town Hall

- Flag Coat of arms

- Location within Poland
- Coordinates: 50°4′N 22°30′E
- Country: Poland
- Voivodeship: Subcarpathian
- County: Przeworsk
- Gmina: Przeworsk (urban gmina)
- Established: 10th-11th century
- First mentioned: 1280
- Town rights: 1393

Government
  - Mayor: Leszek Kisiel

Area
  - Total: 21.98 km^{2} (8.49 sq mi)
- Elevation: 200 m (660 ft)

Population (2006)
  - Total: 15,747
  - Density: 716.4/km^{2} (1,856/sq mi)
- Time zone: UTC+1 (CET)
  - Summer (DST): UTC+2 (CEST)
- Postal code: 37–200
- Car plates: RPZ
- Website: www.przeworsk.um.gov.pl

Przeworsk (Note: Polish: [ˈpʂɛvɔrsk]; Yiddish: פּרשעוואָרסק, romanized: Prshevorsk; Ukrainian: Переворськ, romanized: Perevors'k) is a town in south-eastern Poland with 15,675 inhabitants, as of 2 June 2009. Since 1999, it has been in the Subcarpathian Voivodeship, and is the capital of Przeworsk County. The ancient Przeworsk culture was named after the town.

Przeworsk began as a Slavic fortified settlement in the 10th century, though evidence of human settlement in the general area is even older. It is first mentioned in historical records from the 13th century. Przeworsk was granted its town charter by King Władysław II Jagiełło of Poland in 1394. Following the Partitions of Poland, from 1772, the town was part of the Austrian Habsburg empire until 1918, when an independent Poland returned.

Przeworsk is located on European route E40. It also is an important railway junction, with trains going in three directions – east (towards Przemyśl), west (towards Rzeszów) and north (towards Stalowa Wola).

Przeworsk has some 60 historic buildings, including two fortified Gothic abbeys, a town hall, the Lubomirski Palace in classical style, a baroque monastery, and an open-air museum (skansen). The town covers an area of 22 square kilometres (8.5 square miles).

== History ==
=== Name variations ===
In 13th century Ruthenian documents, Przeworsk was spelt Pereworesk. In the 14th and 15th centuries, its name was subject to variation. It was called Preworsko, Przeworsko, Przeworszko, Przeworscho, Przeiworsko, Przyworsko and Prziborsko. Since the 15th century, the name Przeworsko was most often used.

=== Recorded history ===
In the early Middle Ages, a defensive gord existed there. The area was included in the emerging Duchy of Poland by its first historic ruler Mieszko I in the 10th century. In 981 it was annexed from Poland by the Kievan Rus', and afterwards, in the High Middle Ages, it changed owners several times between Poland and the Rus', and even fell to the Mongol Empire in the mid-13th century. It was first mentioned in documents from 1280, when, after the Battle of Gozlice (23 February 1280) between Lesser Polish and Ruthenian-Tatar forces, Duke Leszek II the Black raided the Kingdom of Galicia–Volhynia, then vassal of the Golden Horde, capturing and setting alight the city of "Perevoresk"

"Въ лѣт̑ 6789 (1281) Иде Льстько на Лва и взѧ оу него городъ Переворескъ и исъсѣче и люди в нем̑ вси ѿ мала и до велика и город̑ зажьже и поиде назадъ во своӕси"

In the year 6789, (1281) Leszek attacked Leo I of Galicia, and took his city of Perevoresk and killed all in it, sparing neither young or old and having burnt the town to the ground he left.

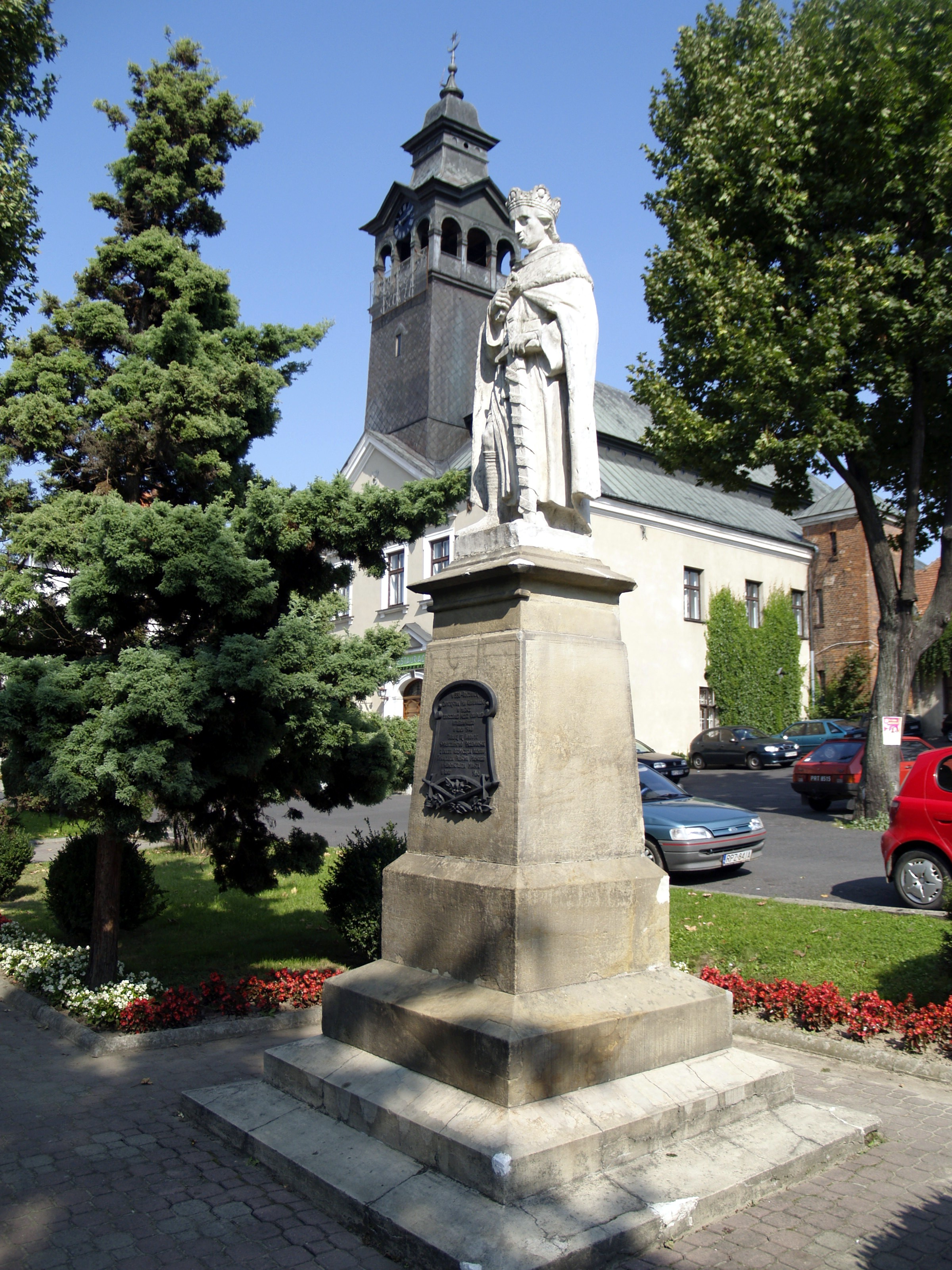
Monument of Polish King Władysław II Jagiełło who vested Przeworsk with town rights in 1393

After the Galicia–Volhynia Wars in mid-14th century, this territory of the Kingdom of Galicia–Volhynia, was reincorporated to the Kingdom of Poland by King Casimir III the Great and afterwards transformed into the Ruthenian Voivodeship within the larger Lesser Poland Province of the Polish Crown. Soon Polish settlers came to the deserted border areas, and in November 1387, King Władysław II Jagiełło ceded Przeworsk to the Voivode of Sandomierz, Jan of Tarnow, Leliwa coat of arms. Przeworsk grew fast, and on 25 February 1393, Jagiełło granted it a town charter.

Until the 18th century, Przeworsk was a private town of several Polish noble families, as it passed through Tarnowski, Ostrogski and Lubomirski ownership. Since 1470, it was the seat of the Land court for the western territory of Przemyśl Land in the Ruthenian Voivodeship. Przeworsk became the second largest town in the area after Przemyśl, prospering in the period known as, the Polish Golden Age. It was situated on a round hill, 212 metres (696 feet) above sea level. Its center was protected by a rampart with a moat. The town hall was built in the 15th century.

Since Crimean Tatars often raided the southeastern Poland, and sometimes even reached its south-central parts, in 1510 the construction of ramparts was started. The defences of Przeworsk consisted of three main elements: a fortified Bernardine monastery in the east, a fortified Order of the Holy Sepulchre monastery in the west, and the town with its three gates in the middle. These fortifications turned out to be inadequate, as both in 1612 and 1624, Przeworsk was captured by the Tatars. Later, the town was captured by the Cossacks (1672, 1677), Swedes (1702) and Russians during the Great Northern War. On 22/23 March 1656, Charles X Gustav of Sweden spent one night here, during his failed raid on south-central Poland. Przeworsk suffered in several successive fires (1712, 1717, 1739, 1740, 1759). All these events contributed to the town's steep decline.

In the mid-18th century, the town's population consisted of 76% Roman Catholics (Poles) and 24% Jews.

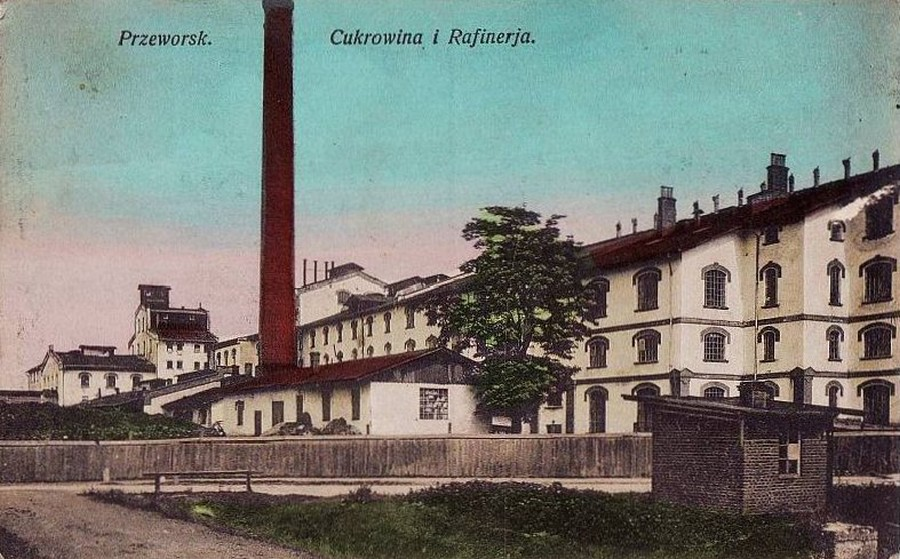
Sugar factory in the early 20th century

In First Partition of Poland, in 1772, Przeworsk was annexed by the Habsburg Empire, remaining in Austrian Galicia until November 1918. In the late 18th century, the Austrian authorities pulled down the obsolete late-medieval ramparts and gates. The town remained in decline until the late 19th century, when it became a railway junction, and a center of sugar production, with the Przeworsk Sugar Refinery (1895). In 1859, Przeworsk was connected by rail with Kraków by the Galician Railway of Archduke Charles Louis. In 1902 it had a new railroad to Rozwadów, and in 1904, a narrow gauge line to Dynów was completed. The population began to grow, new housing was built, together with a monument dedicated to King Władysław II Jagiełło (1910), but World War I brought destruction to the town.

In 1918 Poland regained independence, and in the Second Polish Republic Przeworsk was part of Lwów Voivodeship. In 1929, it became of a county seat and in 1930, several buildings burned down in a fire.

During the joint German-Soviet invasion of Poland, which started World War II, Germany conducted air raids on 3, 5 and 6 September 1939, in which several people were killed and many were wounded. Przeworsk was captured by the Wehrmacht on 9 September 1939, and then the Einsatzgruppe I entered the town to commit various atrocities against Poles. The German occupation lasted until 27 July 1944. During the Intelligenzaktion, on November 3, 1939, the Germans deceitfully gathered the local Polish intelligentsia for a formal meeting, then arrested 58 people and imprisoned them in Rzeszów. The Jewish community was decimated in German extermination camps.

The Pshevorsk Hasidic dynasty, which originated in Przeworsk, is now mainly located in Antwerp, Belgium.

== Tourist attractions ==
Sights of Przeworsk

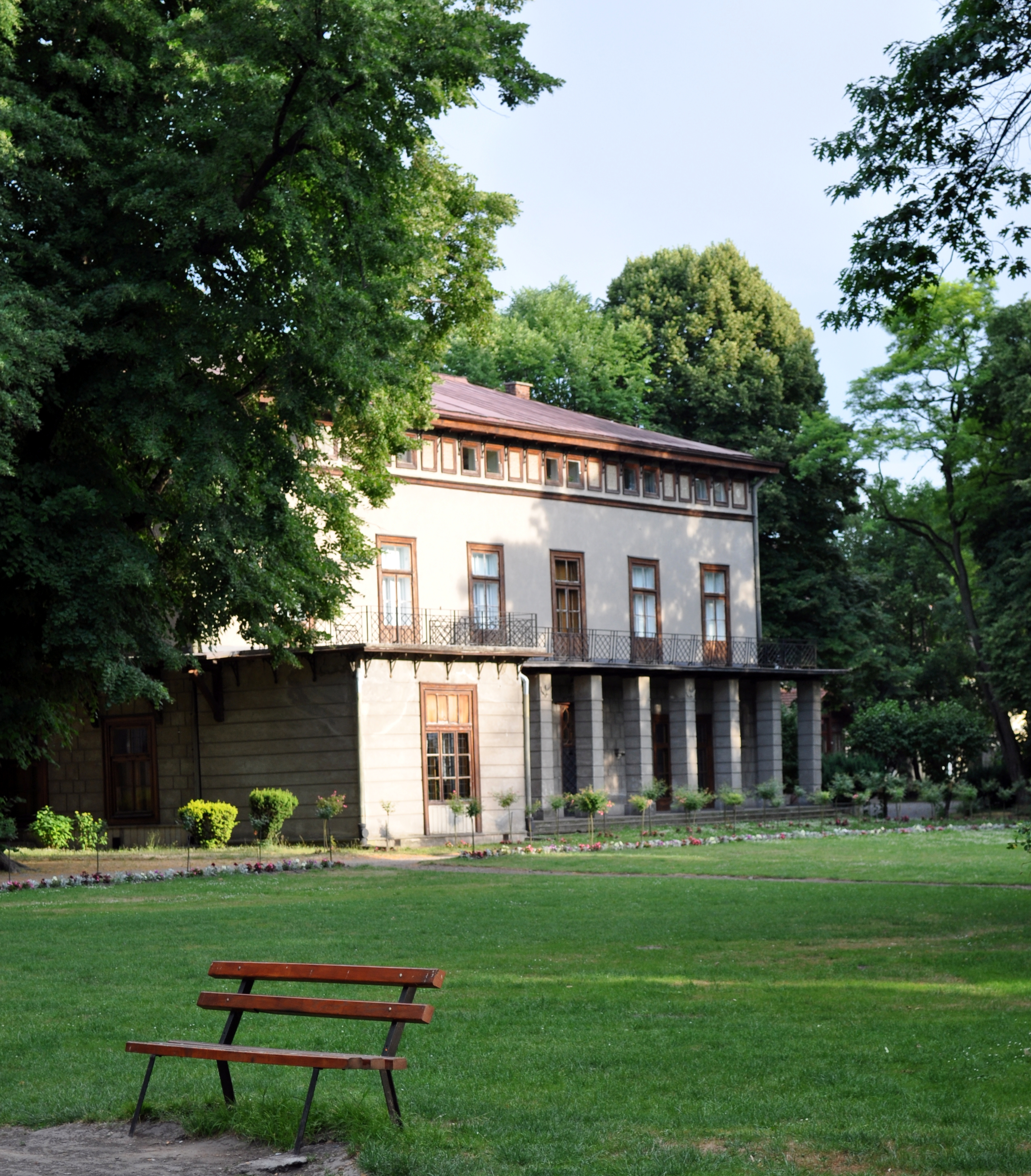
Lubomirski Palace

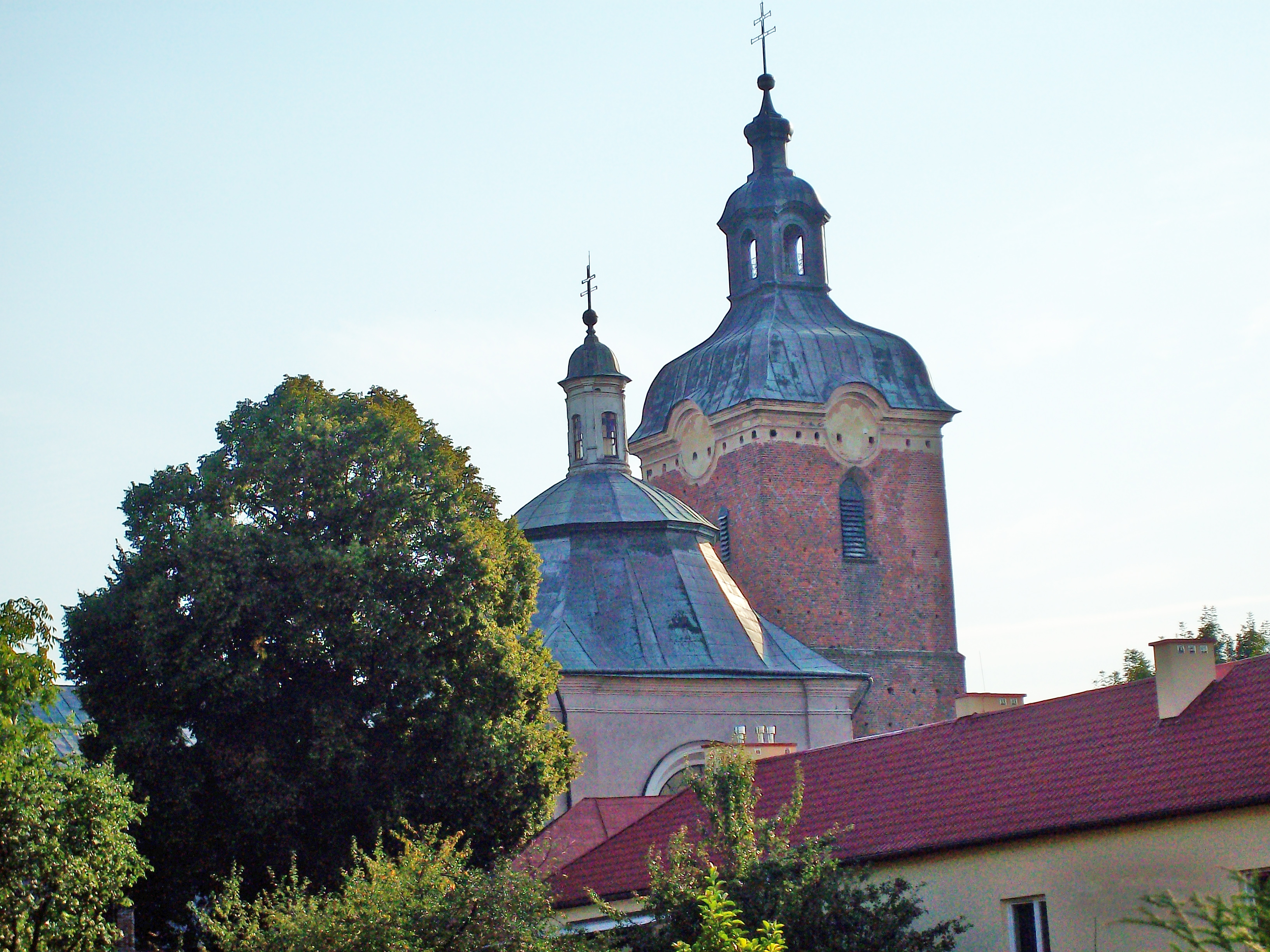
Basilica of the Holy Spirit

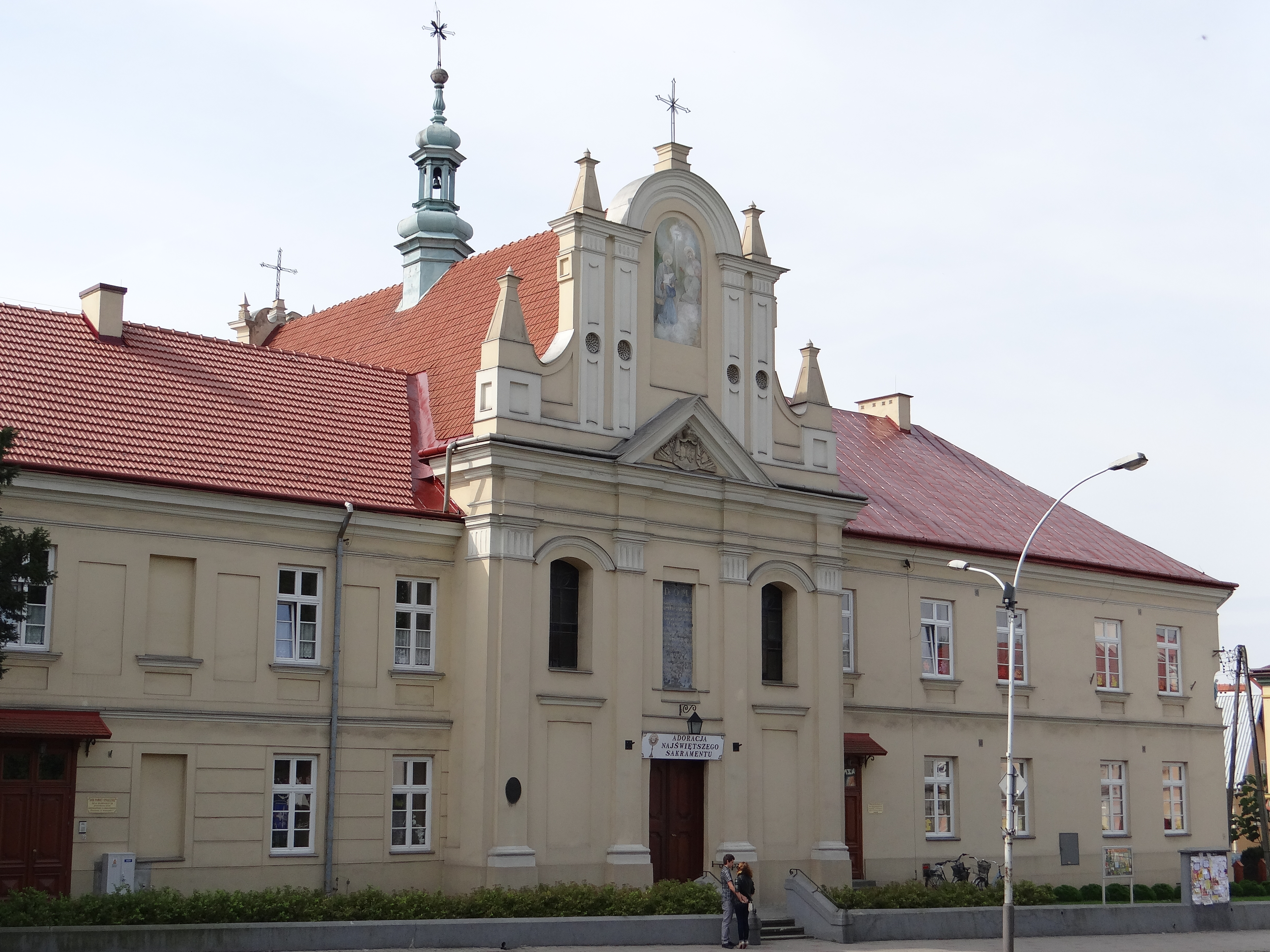
Daughters of Charity monastery

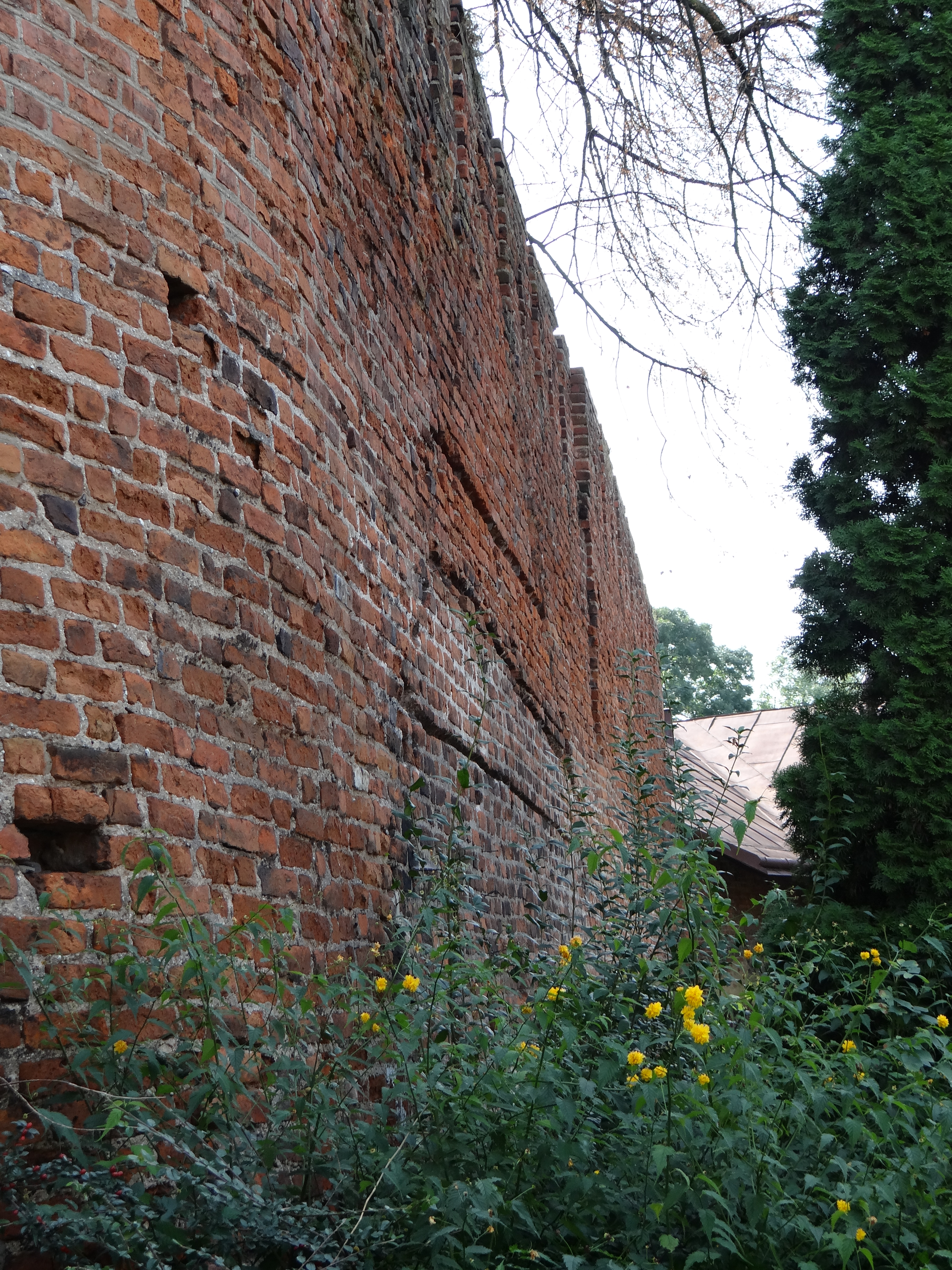
Defensive town walls

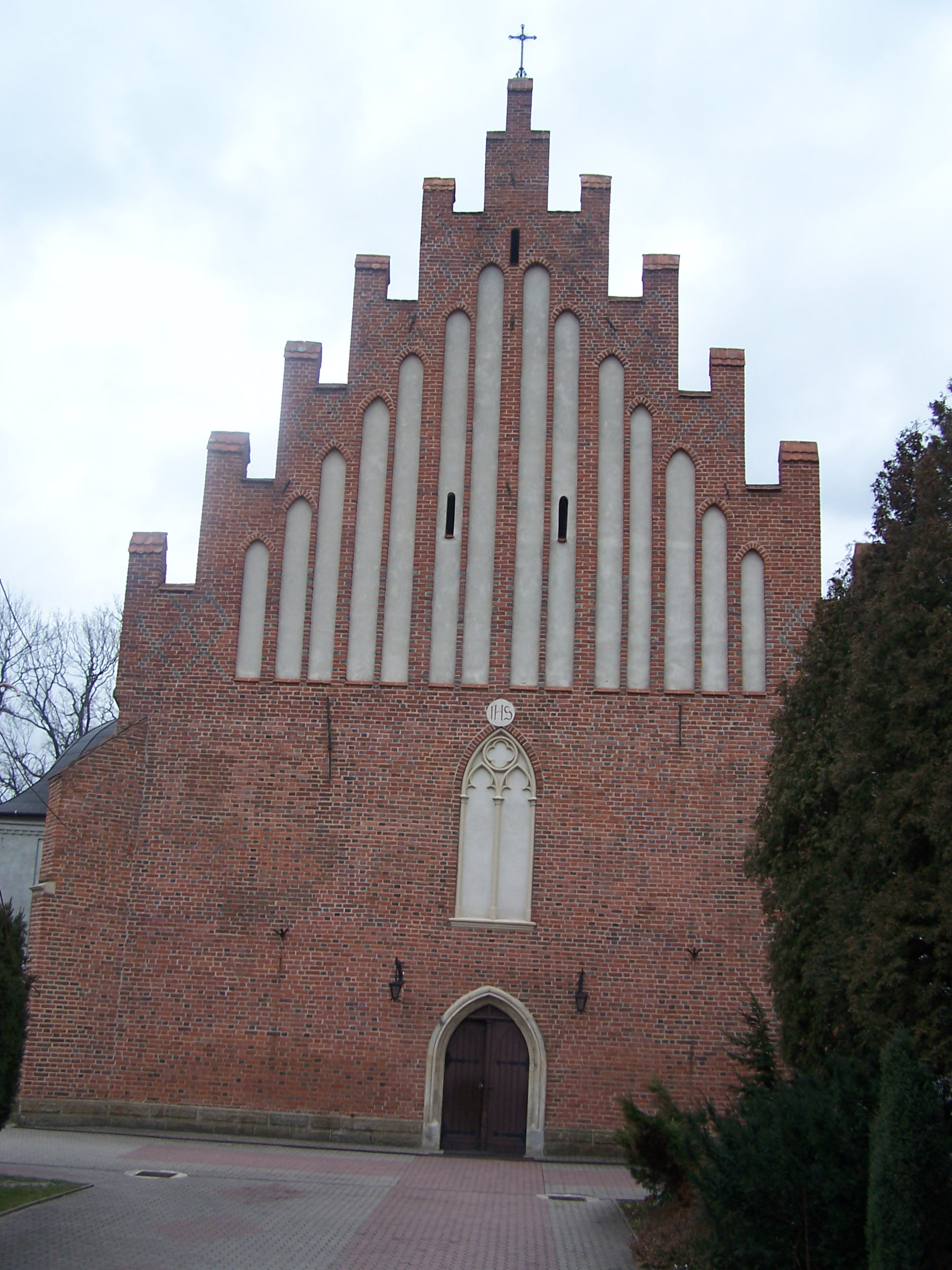
Bernardine Church

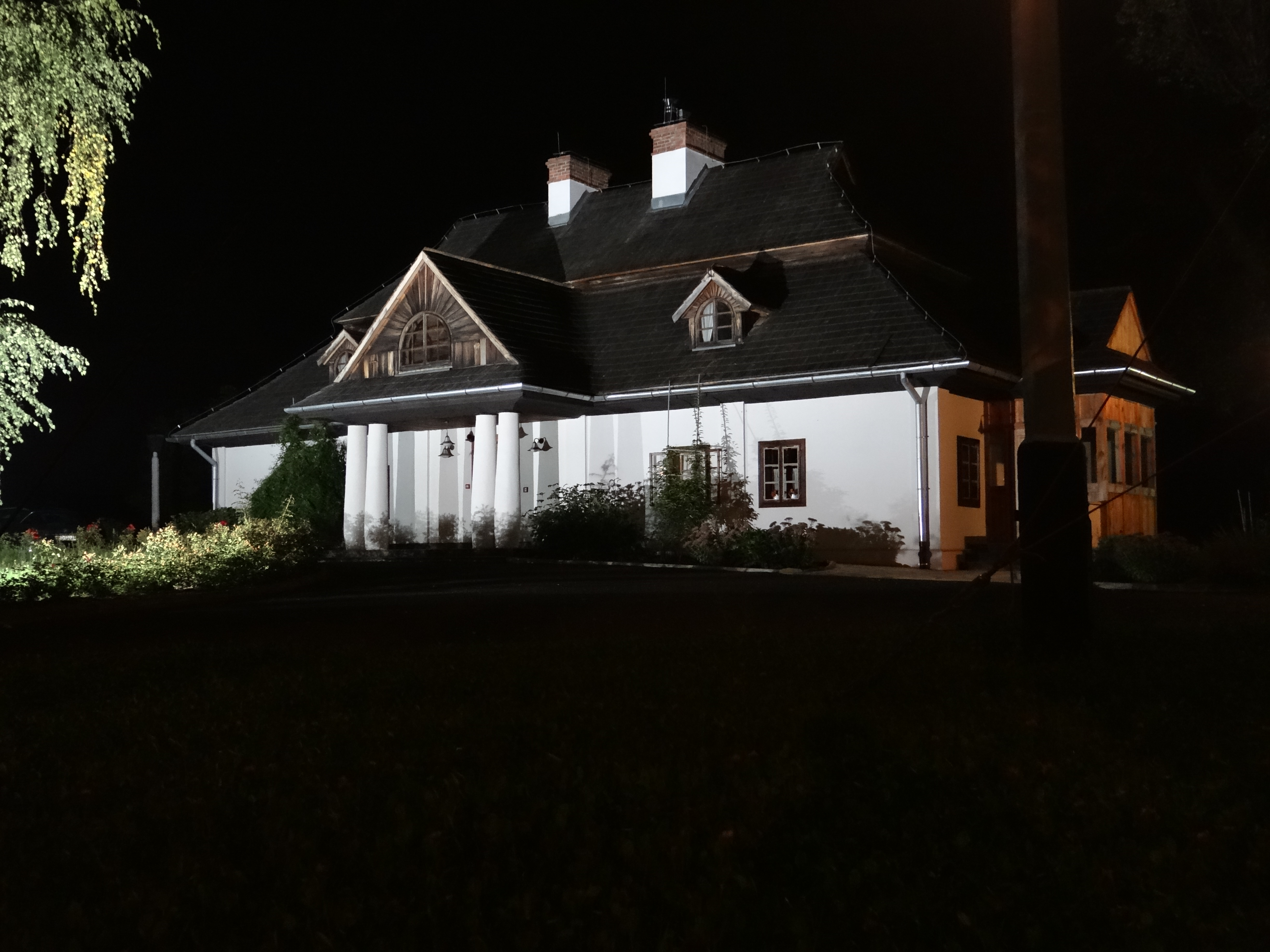
Open-air museum

- Basilica of the Holy Spirit, built in the 15th century with a unique chapel – Tomb of Jesus Christ (the same as in Jerusalem)
- Gothic Church of the Bernardine Order
- Palace and park of Lubomirski family
- Baroque Daughters of Charity monastery and Our Lady of the Snow church
- Gothic defensive town walls
- Monument of Polish King Władysław II Jagiełło at the Rynek (Market Square)
- The only truly "vivid" open-air museum in Poland, with wooden houses from Przeworsk and the surrounding region.
- The Wąskotorówka Train (narrow gauge railway) going from Przeworsk to Dynów.
- Firefighting Museum

== Sport ==
The local football team is Orzeł Przeworsk. It competes in the lower leagues.

== Notable people ==
- Piotr Aigner – architect of the Lubomirski Palace
- Fryderyk Bauman – architect, sculptor and designer of the Lubomirski Palace interiors
- Andrzej Ćwierz – Member of the Sejm
- Antoni Lubomirski – founder with his wife, Zofia Lubomirska, of the Sisters of St. Vincent de Paul convent and church
- Zofia Lubomirska – founder of the vast textile and silk factories
- Izabela Maria Lubomirska – princess
- Henryk Ludwik Lubomirski – prince
- Paweł Miesiąc – Motorcycle speedway rider
- Zygmunt Mycielski – composer and musicologist
- Tadeusz Rut – athlete
- Andrzej Sztolf – ski jumper

== Twin towns – sister cities ==
Przeworsk is twinned with:

- Berehove, Ukraine
- Mělník, Czech Republic
- Moravský Krumlov, Czech Republic
