= Ludwik Skumin Tyszkiewicz =

Polish–Lithuanian nobleman (1748–1808)

- Marshal of the Sejm; Grand Marshal of Lithuania; Grand Treasurer of Lithuania; Field Hetman of Lithuania
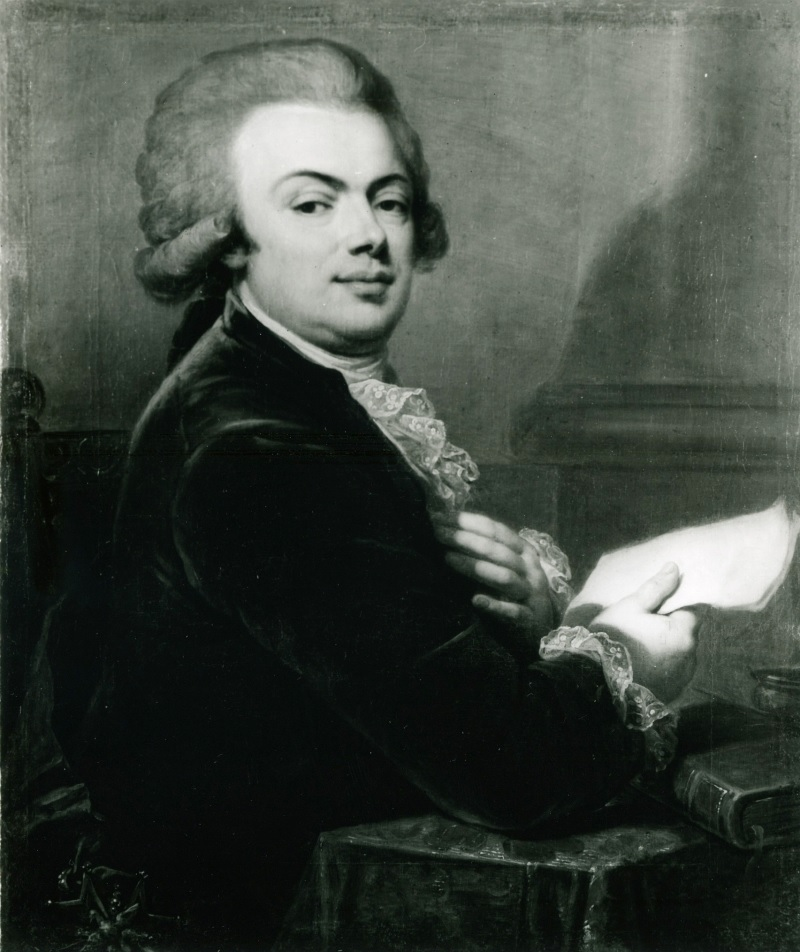
- Coat of arms: Leliwa – Skumin
- Full name: Hrabia Ludwik Skumin Tyszkiewicz herbu Leliwa
- Born: 1748; Vilnius, Poland–Lithuania
- Died: 26 June 1808 (aged 59–60)
- Family: Skumin
- Consort: Konstancja Poniatowska
- Issue: Anna Maria Ewa Apolonia Tyszkiewicz
- Father: Józef Skumin Tyszkiewicz
- Mother: Anna Pociej h. Waga

Ludwik Skumin Tyszkiewicz (Lithuanian: Liudvikas Tiškevičius; 1748 – 26 June 1808) was a Polish–Lithuanian nobleman (szlachcic) and Field Lithuanian Hetman from 1780 to 1791, Grand Treasurer of Lithuania from 1791, Great Lithuanian Marshal from 1793. Member of the Targowica Confederation.

In 1764, as an envoy from the Trakai Voivodeship he was an elector for Stanisław August Poniatowski, whose niece Konstancja Poniatowska, the daughter of Prince Kazimierz Poniatowski, he married in Warsaw on 4 April 1775. Their daughter Anna married Count Aleksander Stanisław Potocki.

In 1776, Tyszkiewicz was an envoy to the Sejm from the Vilnius Voivodeship. and in 1778 was made the Marshal of the Sejm. In 1782, he was a supporter of the Permanent Council. During the Polish–Russian War of 1792, on a meeting of 23 July, he supported the accession of the king to the Targowica Confederation, whose example Tyszkiewicz himself soon followed, becoming Grand Marshal of Lithuania. During the Grodno Sejm, he was chosen as a negotiator with the Russian ambassador Jacob Sievers, and so on 22 July 1793 he signed the treaty of the cession of land to Russia, and then on 25 September to Prussia, as part of the Second Partition of Poland. In 1795, he was the leader of the Lithuanian party paying homage to Catherine II.

On 25 November 1776, he received the Order of the White Eagle and in 1778 the Order of St. Stanislaus. Later in 1787 he also received the Russian Orders of St. Alexander Nevsky and of St. Andrew. In 1792, he had built the Tyszkiewicz Palace in Warsaw.

== See also ==
- Skumin
