= Kazimierz Poniatowski =

Polish noble (1721–1800)

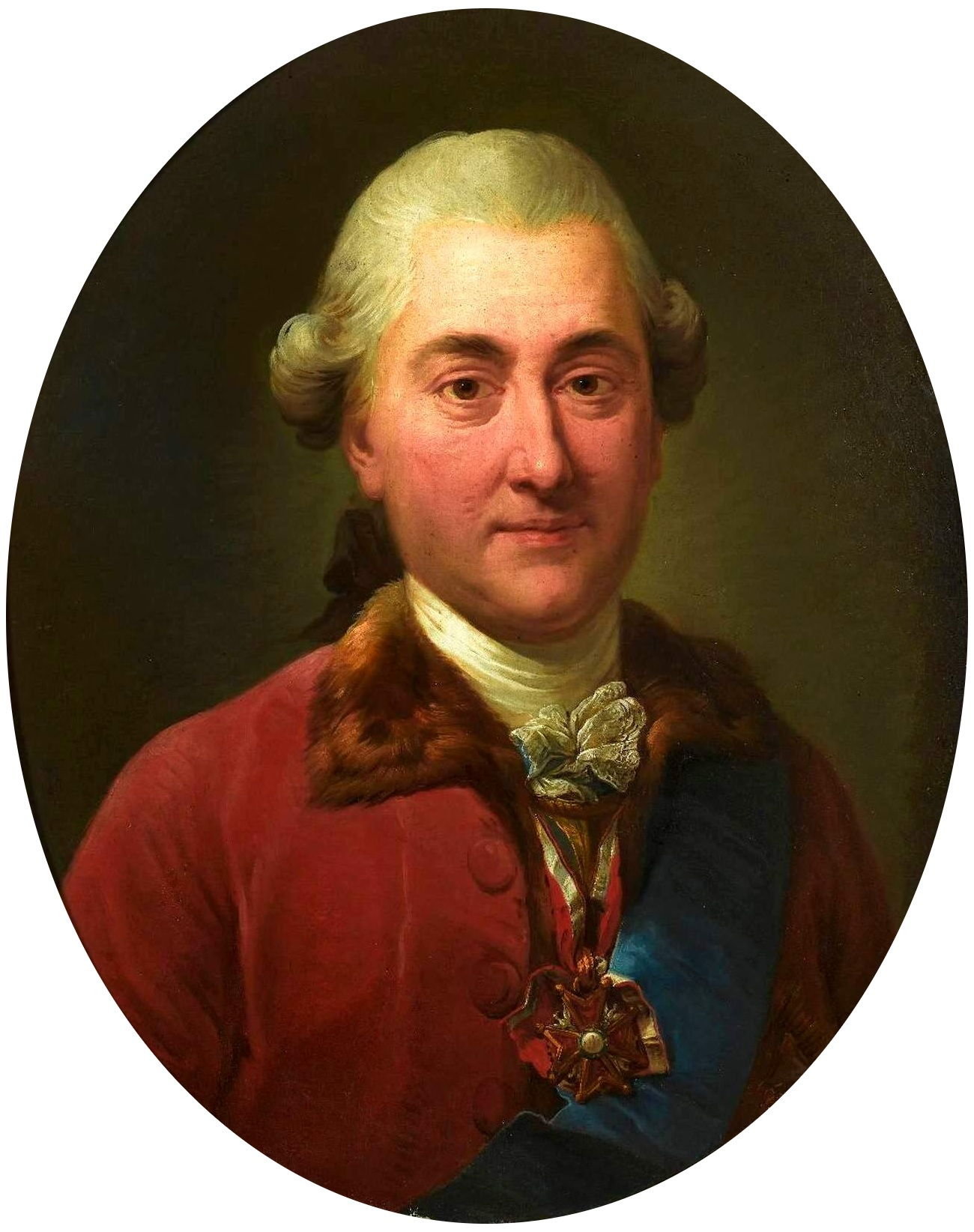
- Coat of arms: Ciołek
- Full name: Ks. Kazimierz Poniatowski herbu Ciołek
- Born: 15 September 1721; Warsaw, Polish–Lithuanian Commonwealth
- Died: 13 April 1800 (aged 78); Warsaw, Prussia
- Noble family: Poniatowski
- Spouse: Apolonia Ustrzycka
- Issue: Stanislaw Poniatowski; Konstancja Poniatowska
- Father: Stanisław Poniatowski
- Mother: Konstancja Czartoryska

Prince Kazimierz Poniatowski (15 September 1721 – 13 April 1800) was a Polish nobleperson, podkomorzy wielki koronny (1742–1773), Lieutenant general of the Royal Polish forces, generał wojsk koronnych. Knight of the Order of the White Eagle, awarded on 3 August 1744 in Warsaw.

== Early life ==
He was the eldest of eight surviving children of Princess Konstancja Czartoryska and of Count Stanisław Poniatowski, Ciołek coat of arms, Castellan of Kraków. Among his siblings were Canon Franciszek Poniatowski (canon of Krakow Cathedral who suffered from Epilepsy), Aleksander Poniatowski (an officer killed in the Rhineland-Palatinate during the War of the Austrian Succession), Ludwika Zamoyska, Izabella Branicka, Stanislaw Antoni Poniatowski (King of Poland and Grand duke of Lithuania), Andrzej Poniatowski (an Austrian Feldmarschall), and Michał Jerzy Poniatowski (Primate of Poland).

He was a great-grandson of the poet, courtier and alleged traitor, Jan Andrzej Morsztyn and through his great-grandmother, Catherine Gordon, lady-in-waiting to Queen Marie Louise Gonzaga, he was related to the House of Stuart and thereby connected to the leading families of Scotland, Spain and France.

== Career ==
In the 18th century the Poniatowski family had achieved high rank among the Polish nobility (szlachta).

He was created Prince by his brother, King Stanisław II August Poniatowski on 4 December 1764. After the First Partition of Poland (1772), he sold off his Podkomorzy title, played no further part in politics and joined the "high life". He was considered a model of a "wastrel".

== Personal life ==
On 21 January 1751 he married Apolonia Ustrzycka (1736–1814), a daughter of Bazyli Ustrzycki, castellan of Przemyśl, and widow of Prince Antoni Lubomirski. Together, they had one son and two daughters:

- Prince Stanisław Poniatowski (1754–1833), the Grand Treasurer of Lithuania who had five children with Cassandra Luci.
- Princess Katarzyna Poniatowska (1756–1773), who died young.
- Princess Konstancja Poniatowska (1759–1830), who married Ludwik Tyszkiewicz, in 1775; she was one of the closest friends of the French Minister of Foreign Affairs, Charles Maurice de Talleyrand-Périgord.

Prince Kazimierz died in Warsaw on 13 April 1800.
