= Zofia Lubomirska =

Polish noblewoman

- Princess
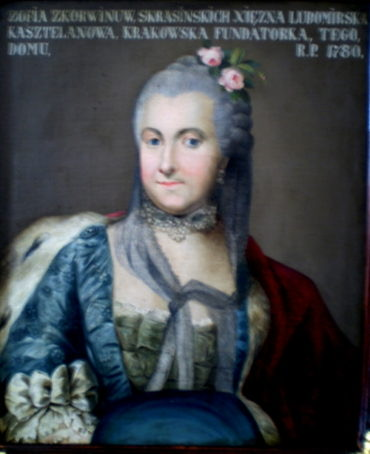
- Zofia Tarłowa-Lubomirska, née Korwin Krasińska
- Born: 1718; Sandomierz Voivodeship
- Died: 27 October 1790 (aged 71–72); Warsaw
- Noble family: Krasiński, Tarło and Lubomirski
- Spouses: Jan Tarło (1684–1750), Antoni Lubomirski (1718–1782)
- Issue: Son with Antoni Lubomirski died in infancy
- Father: Aleksander Krasiński
- Mother: Salomea Trzcińska

Zofia Lubomirska (1718 – 27 October 1790) was an independently wealthy Polish noblewoman and landowner, known for her political involvement and philanthropy.

== Life ==
She was born in the Sandomierz Voivodeship the daughter of Aleksander Krasiński (1690–1730) and his wife, Salomea Trzcińska. She married firstly Jan Tarło (d. 1750), who left her the town of Opole Lubelskie in his will. In 1754, she married the magnate, Antoni Lubomirski, with whom she was actively involved in state affairs. She reportedly persuaded Lubomirski to end his alliance with Austria and instead become a French agent by accepting an alliance with France. Both her first spouse and her brother, Stanisław, were pro-French.

=== Enlightenment activist ===
On finding out about it after the event, she opposed the marriage of her niece, Franciszka Korwin-Krasińska to Charles of Saxony, Duke of Courland, but relented having been persuaded by her husband and brother who saw it as an advancement, since Charles had prospects for the Polish throne. She and August Aleksander Czartoryski insisted that the marriage be made legitimate and public. However abroad, outside Polish Szlachta circles, it was considered a Morganatic marriage. During the interregnum of 1763–64, she supported the candidacy of Charles for the throne, while attempting to build a bridge between the Patriotic Party, which she represented, and the Familia (political party) of her ally, Czartoryski. During the Radom Confederation, she visited Warsaw with her niece, Franciszka. She negotiated with August Czartoryski and Grand Guardian of the Crown, Stanisław Lubomirski (1722–1782), her brother-in-Law, to ally them both to the Confederation in 1769–70. She kept in close contact with her older cousin, Adam Stanisław Krasiński, Bishop of Kamieniec.

She produced two political commentaries about Polish politics in 1770, in which she argued for the reform of the rights of the nobility as well as to reform the civil and judicial court systems. She spent most of her life on her domains in Opole, Przeworsk and Dobromił, where she reformed farming and stock management. She set up a vast Textile mill with the help of foreign expertise. After the fall of the Radom Confederation, she lived in her palace in Przeworsk with Franciszka Krasińska, whom she eventually reunited with her husband, Charles in Opole in 1775. They managed to have one surviving daughter, Maria Christina whose descendants became members of the Italian Monarchy. In 1781, she hosted Grand Duke Paul of Russia in disguise, as Monsieur du Nord, in Opole, then king Stanisław August Poniatowski in 1787.

=== Administrator and entrepreneur ===
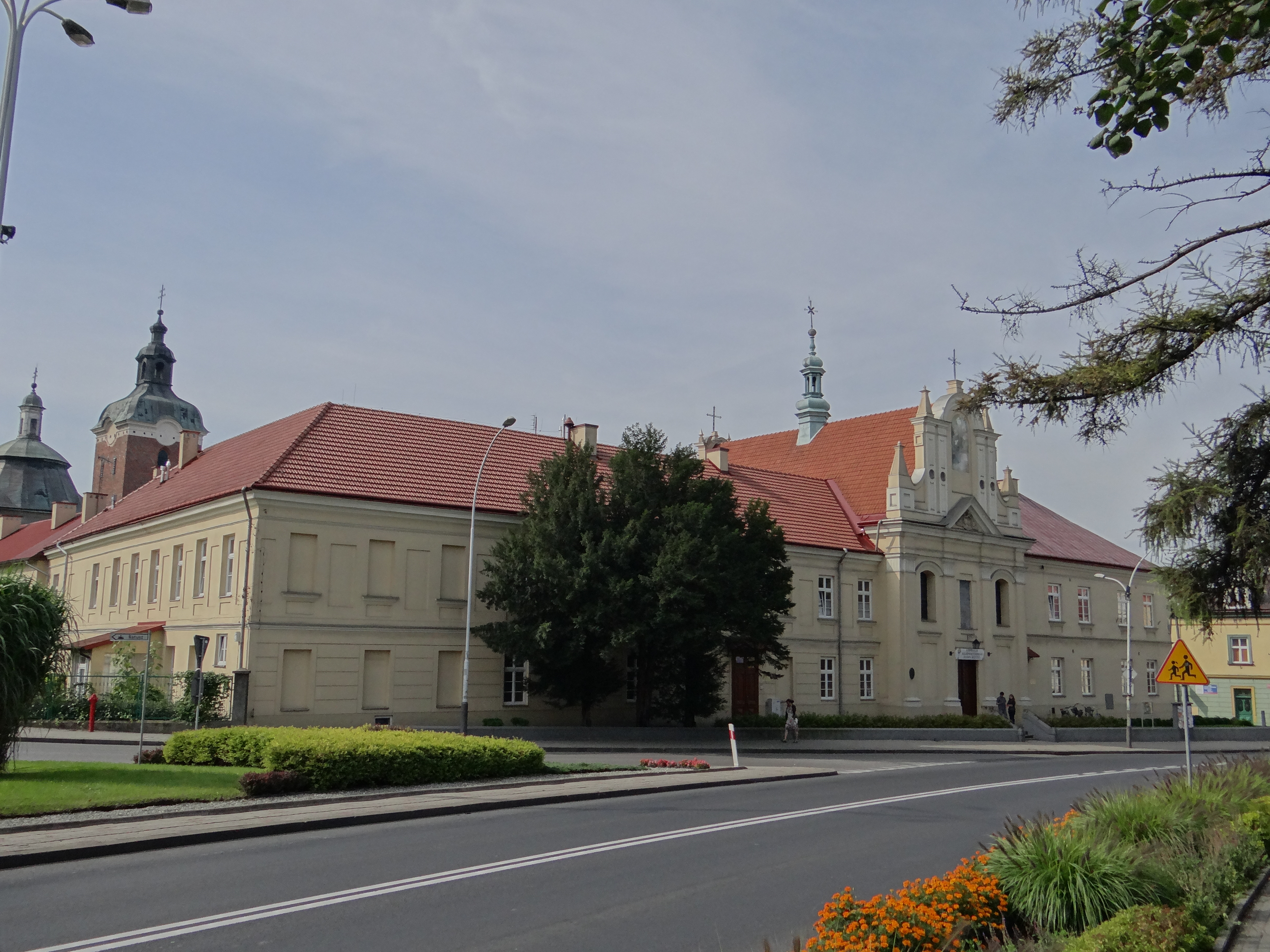
Church of Our Lady of the Snows flanked by the Sisters of Charity convent founded by Antoni and Zofia Lubomirski in Przeworsk

Zofia refurbished the buildings, especially the palaces on her estates, with the help of leading architects and designers. In the town of Przeworsk aside from the textile factory she set up a silk production making the famous ornate bands favoured by many Polish noblemen, Pas kontuszowy. She was known as a patron of the arts, especially of literary authors. After the death of her first husband, Jan, she founded a new hospital in Opole. With her second husband, Antoni, she founded a church and convent for the congregation of the Sisters of Charity in Przeworsk.

She died a widow in Warsaw on 27 October 1790.

== Bibliography ==
- Biography in the 1972 vol. XVII of the Polish Biographical Dictionary, PSB or online: www.https://ipsb.nina.gov.pl/a/biografia/zofia-lubomirska
