= Anna Tyszkiewicz =

Polish noblewoman (1779–1867)

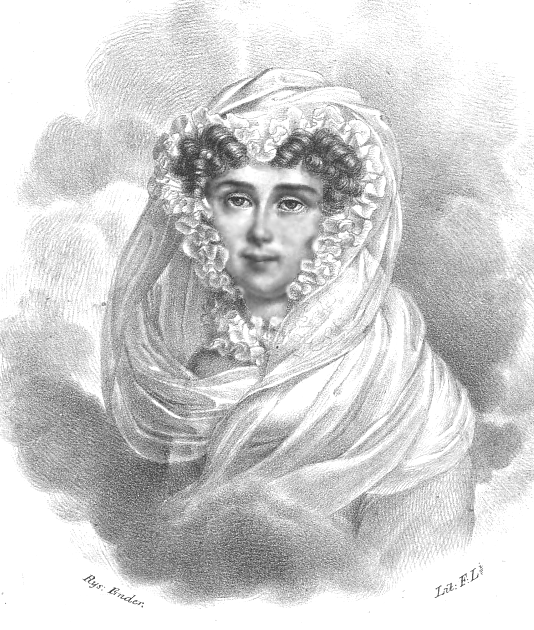
- Coat of arms: Leliwa
- Full name: Anna Potocka z Tyszkiewiczów herbu Leliwa
- Born: 26 March 1779; Warsaw, Masovian Voivodeship, Kingdom of Poland, Polish–Lithuanian Commonwealth
- Died: 16 August 1867 (aged 88); Paris
- Family: Tyszkiewicz
- Spouse: Aleksander Stanisław Potocki
- Issue: August Potocki; Natalia Potocka; Maurycy Potocki
- Father: Ludwik Tyszkiewicz
- Mother: Konstancja Poniatowska

Anna Tyszkiewicz (26 March 1779 – 16 August 1867) was a Polish noblewoman and diarist.

Anna was the daughter of Ludwik Tyszkiewicz and Konstancja Poniatowska, and married Aleksander Stanisław Potocki on 15 May 1805 in Wilno, divorced him in 1821 and remarried Stanisław Dunin-Wąsowicz. Her diary was written between the years 1794 and 1820, and are regarded as an important historical source. It was published in 1897–98.

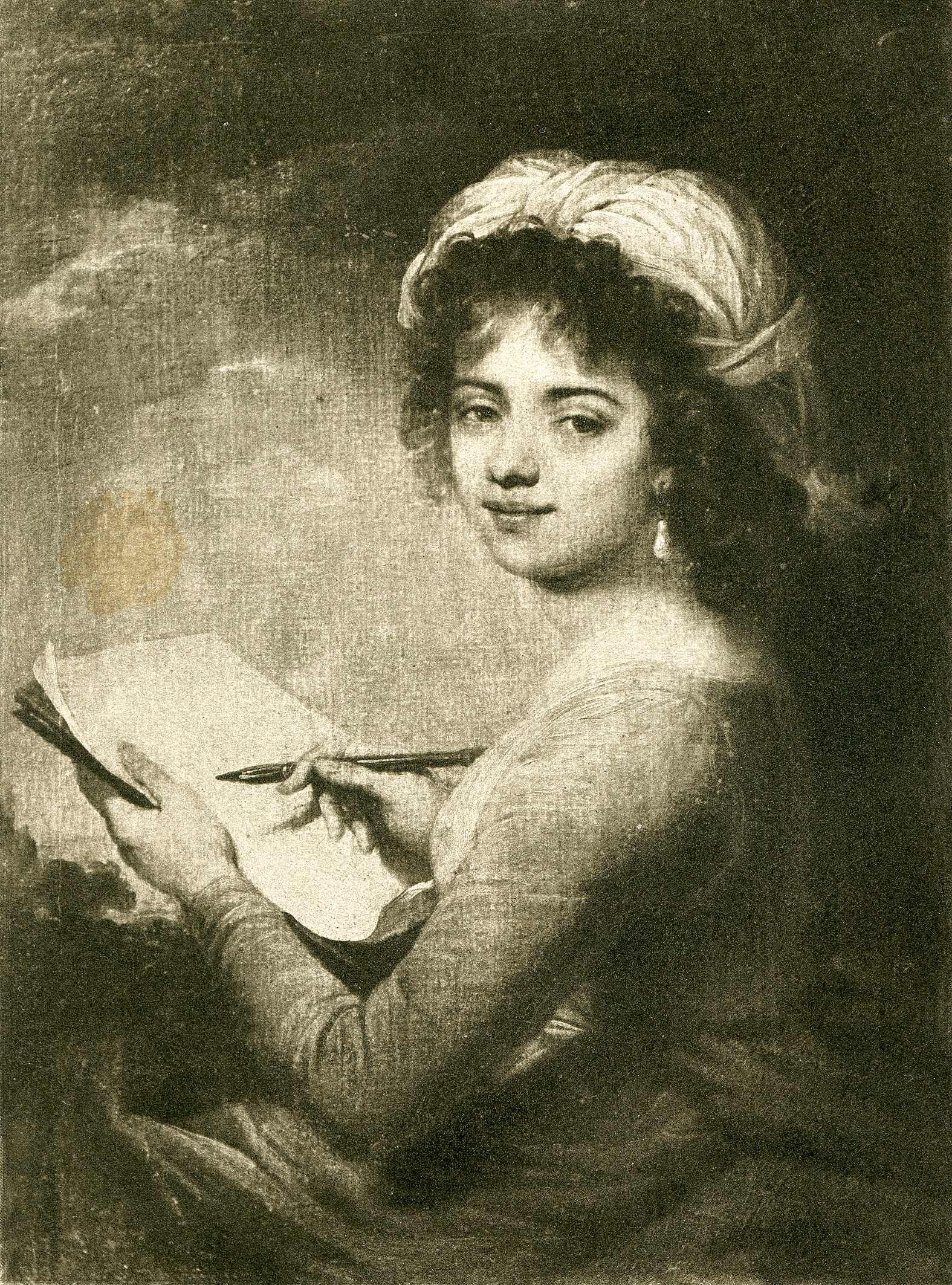
Portrait d'Anna Tyszkiewtcz, comtesse Potocka, par Angelica Kauffmann

== Works ==
- Wspomnienia naocznego świadka. 1898.
- Voyage d'Italie. Paris: Plon. 1899.
- Memoirs of the Countess Potocka (1900)
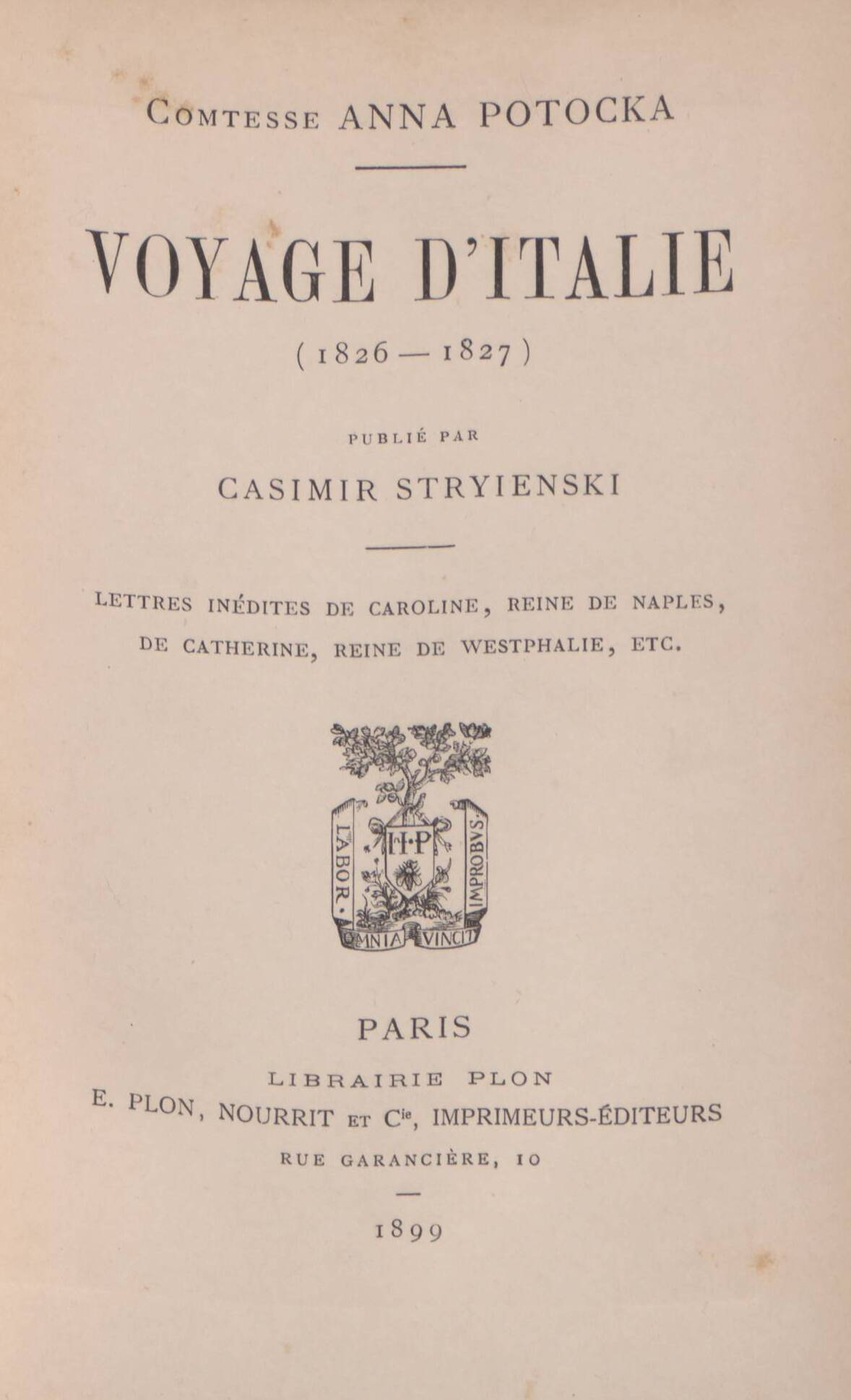
Voyage d'Italie (1899)
