= Antoni Lubomirski =

Polish nobleman and landowner

- Prince
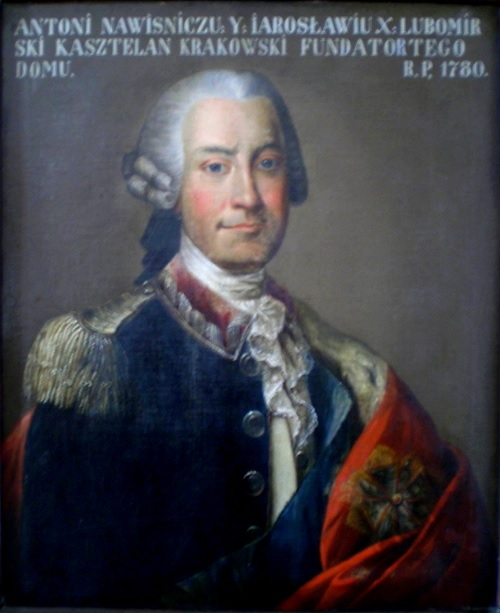

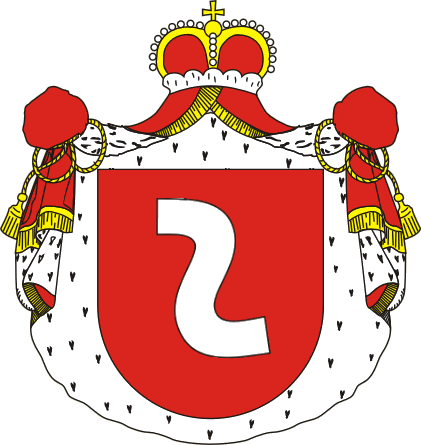
- Coat of arms: Lubomirski
- Full name: Antoni Lubomirski
- Born: 1718
- Died: 1782 (aged 63–64)
- Family: Lubomirski
- Spouses: Apolonia Ustrzycka; Zofia Krasiñska
- Father: Józef Lubomirski
- Mother: Teresa Mniszech

Prince Antoni Lubomirski (1718–1782) was a Polish nobleman, landowner, and general.

Antoni was the owner of Przeworsk and Boguchwała. He became Grand Guardian of the Crown in 1748. He received the Order of the White Eagle in 1750. He was senator for Lublin in 1752, and was also a Lieutenant-General. From 1778 onward, he was voivode of Lublin Voivodeship, and from 1779 onward of the Kraków Voivodeship. He became Castellan of Kraków in 1779, the top-ranking castellan in Poland, and was also starosta of Piotrków Trybunalski.

He was made a Knight of the Order of St. Andrew, the highest order of chivalry of Imperial Russia.

He bought a large mansion in Opole Lubelskie, previously the Słupecki palace in Lublin Voivodship 1754, and rebuilt it from 1766-1773 as the Lubomirski Palace.

He was married twice: firstly, to Apolonia Ustrzycka in 1749, then to Zofia widow of Jan Tarło, née Krasińska in 1754.
