= Jan Tarło (1684–1750) =

Polish nobleman

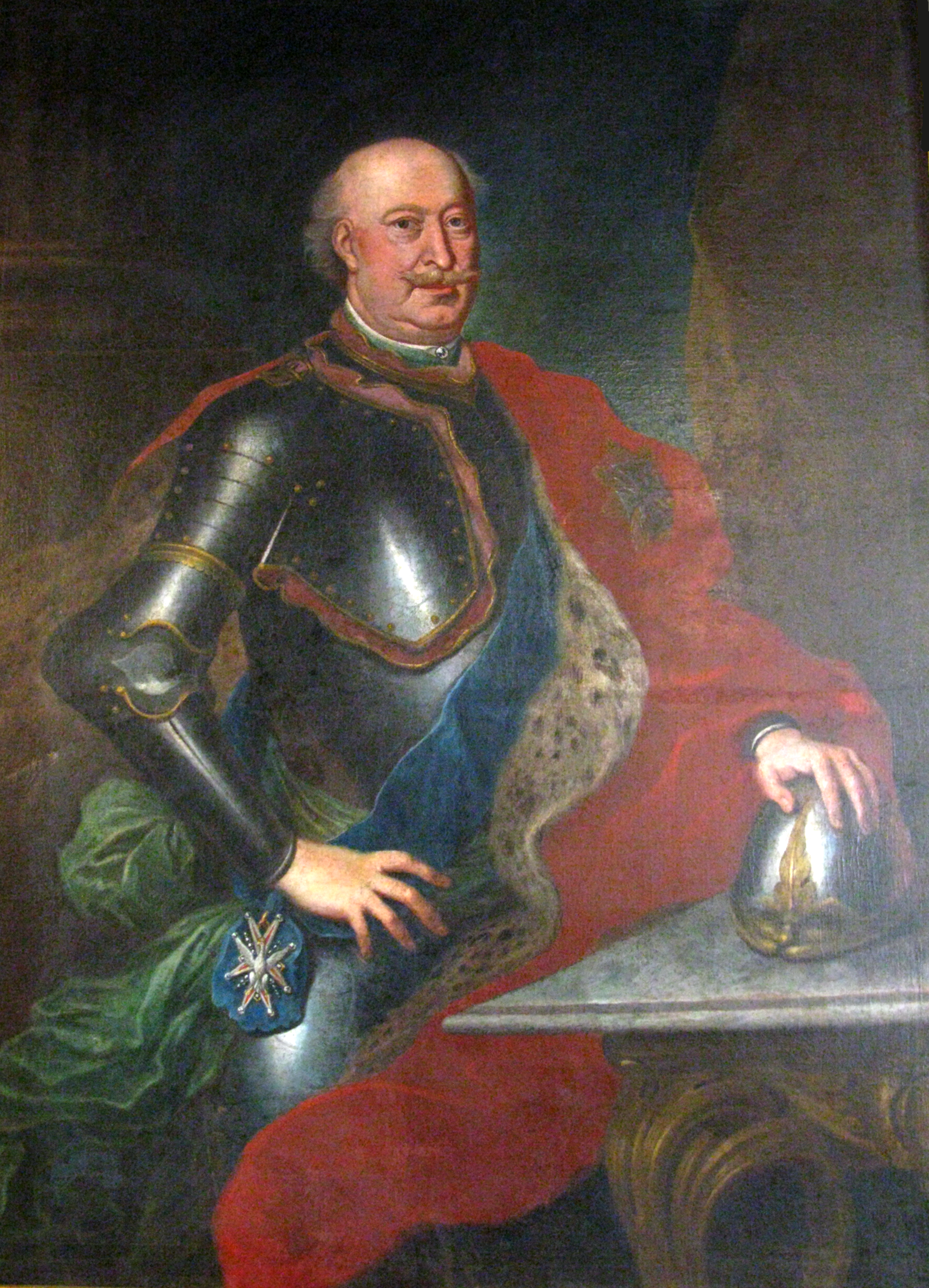
- Coat of arms: Topór
- Born: 1684
- Died: 1750 (aged 65–66); Opole Lubelskie
- Family: Tarło
- Consort: Marianna Lubowiecka; Elżbieta Modrzejewska; Elżbieta Branicka; Zofia Krasińska
- Father: Stanisław Tarło
- Mother: Teresa Dunin Borkowska

Jan Tarło (1684–1750) was a Polish nobleman (szlachcic)

Jan became Colonel of the Crown Army and Podstoli of Crown in 1715, Lieutenant-General of the Crown Army in 1717, voivode of Lublin Voivodeship in 1719, voivode of Sandomierz Voivodeship in 1736. Marshal of the Crown Tribunal and member of the Sejm. He was starost of Medyka, Sokal, Jasło and Grabowiec. Knight of the Order of the White Eagle, awarded in 1736. He was the first husband of the much younger, Zofia Krasińska. In his will, he left her the town of Opole.
