= Podskarbi =

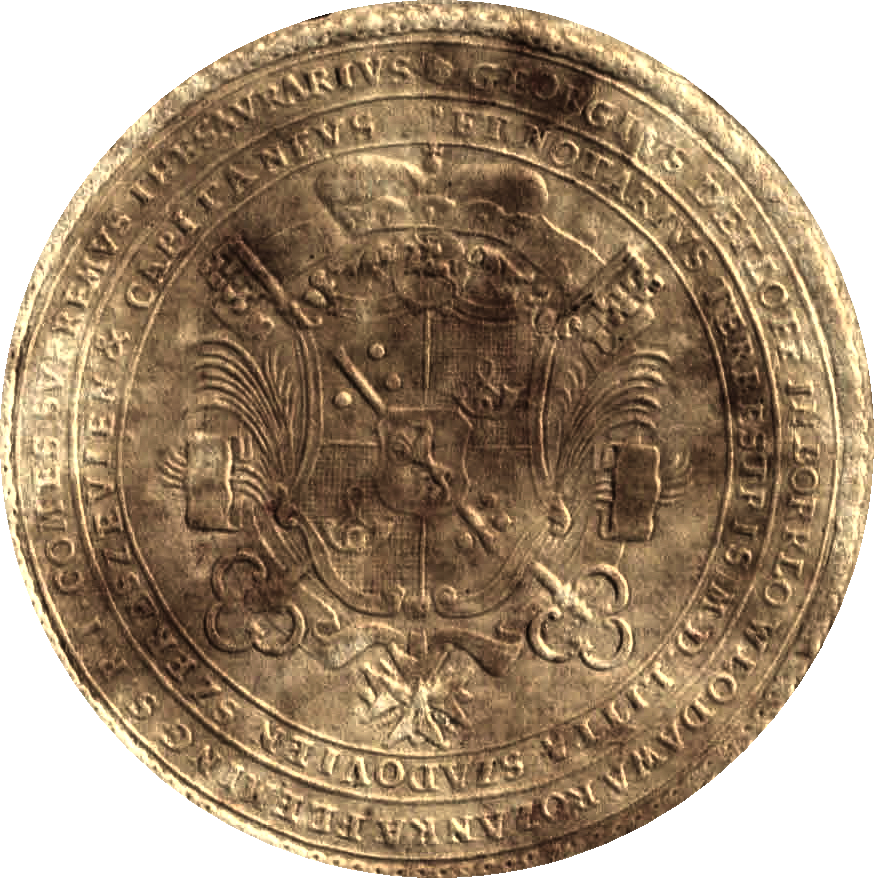
Seal of the Grand Treasurer of Lithuania Jerzy Detloff Flemming in 1757

Podskarbi in the Kingdom of Poland and later in the Polish–Lithuanian Commonwealth was minister responsible for the treasury. Since 1569 also a senatorial office. The title although meaning treasurer can be deconstructed as "under[King]-treasury" – treasury as an old-fashioned adjective. One other title was formed in the same way: "podkomorzy" – not meaning vice.

Following treasury offices where among 14 most important national ministers:

- Podskarbi wielki koronny – Grand Treasurer of the Crown (till 15th century called Podskarbi koronny – Treasurer of the Crown) was the highest ranking treasurer.
- Podskarbi wielki litewski – Grand Treasurer of Lithuania
- Podskarbi nadworny koronny – Court Treasurer of the Crown
- Podskarbi nadworny litewski – Court Treasurer of Lithuania

Lesser treasurers:

- Podskarbi nadworny – Court Treasurer
- Podskarbi Prus – Treasurer of Prussia
- Podskarbi ziemski – District Treasurer

During the rule of King Casimir III the Great, the treasury was managed by Podskarbi of the Kingdom, called Podskarbi koronny (Treasurer of the Crown).

Since the second half of the 15th century Podskarbi koronny was called "Podskarbi wielki koronny" (Grand Treasurer of the Crown) his substitute became the "Podskarbi nadworny" (Court Treasurer).

After the decentralisation of the treasury in 1590, Podskarbi koronny was responsible for the treasury of the state and Podskarbi nadworny for the treasury of the king.

In the Grand Duchy of Lithuania the office of "Podskarbi ziemski" (District Treasurer) changed in 1569 in a senatorial office and since then called "Podskarbi wielki litewski" (Grand Treasurer of Lithuania). There are also existed the office of "Podskarbi nadworny litewski" (Court Treasurer of Lithuania), since the 18th century his responsibility was taken over by Kustosz koronny. The office of Podskarbi in Royal Prussia was called "Podskarbi Prus" (Treasurer of Prussia).

The office of Podskarbi nadworny changed in 1791 in the office of Minister of the Treasury.

== See also ==
- Offices in Polish–Lithuanian Commonwealth
