= Veneziano (surname) =

Veneziano is an Italian surname or given name derived from Venice, Italy, and may refer to:

== People ==
- Agostino Veneziano (c.1490-c.1540), nickname of prolific Italian engraver Agostino de' Musi
- Antonio Veneziano (1543-1593), Italian poet from Sicily, considered among the greatest poets who also wrote in Sicilian
- Antonio Veneziano, Italian painter
- Battista Franco Veneziano (before 1510-1561), Italian Mannerist painter and printmaker in etching
- Corrado Veneziano (born 1958), Italian painter, visual artist, television and theater director
- Domenico Veneziano (c.1410-1461), Italian painter of the early Renaissance, active mostly in Perugia and Tuscany
- Donato Veneziano, 15th-century Italian painter
- Gabriele Veneziano (born 1942), Italian theoretical physicist and one of the "fathers of string theory"; discovered Veneziano amplitude
- Giuseppe Veneziano (born 1971), Italian painter
- Hassan Veneziano, Venetian slave and Algiers regent
- Jacometto Veneziano (1460s-1497), Italian painter and illuminator
- Lorenzo Veneziano, 14th-century Italian painter
- Paolo Veneziano (died after 1358), Italian medieval painter from Venice (also often referenced as Veneziano Paolo)
- Stefano Veneziano, 14th-century Italian painter

== Fictional ==
- Angelina Veneziano, character on The Young and the Restless.
- Italy Veneziano, character from Hetalia: Axis Powers

== See also ==
- Spritz Veneziano, an Italian wine-based cocktail
- Rondò Veneziano, an Italian chamber orchestra
