= Veneziano =

Veneziano, meaning "of Venice", "from Venice", or "the Venetian", may refer to:

- Veneziano (surname), an Italian surname, often derived as a nickname for persons from Venice
- Agostino Veneziano, an Italian engraver of the Renaissance
- Anonimo veneziano (the Anonymous Venetian), a 1970 film
- Il veneziano (The Venetian), the Italian distribution title of the 1987 TV film Casanova
- Gabriele Veneziano, an Italian theoretical physicist, a founder of string theory
- Rondò Veneziano, an Italian chamber orchestra incorporating a rock-style rhythm section
  - Rondò Veneziano, the eponymous first album produced by Rondò Veneziano
- Stucco Veneziano, a decorative plaster sometimes known simply as "Veneziano"
- The Venetian language.
- Veneziano amplitude, a four-tachyon amplitude in string theory.
- Veneziano (Feliciano) Vargas, the younger brother of Italy Romano and the national personification of North Italy from the webmanga series Hetalia: Axis Powers.
