= Czartoryski Library =

Library, branch of the National Museum in Kraków, Poland

Princes Czartoryski Library
- Biblioteka Książąt Czartoryskich
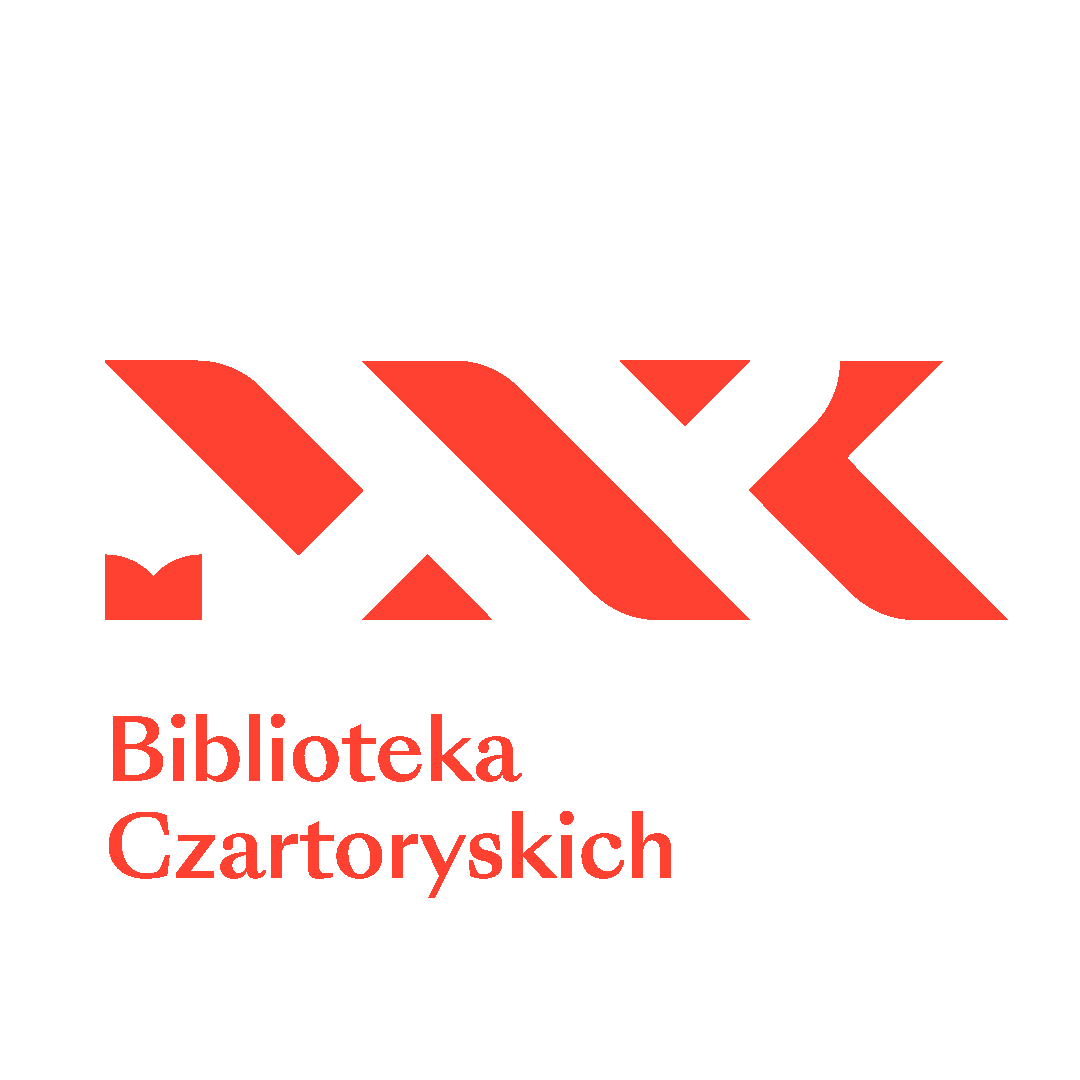

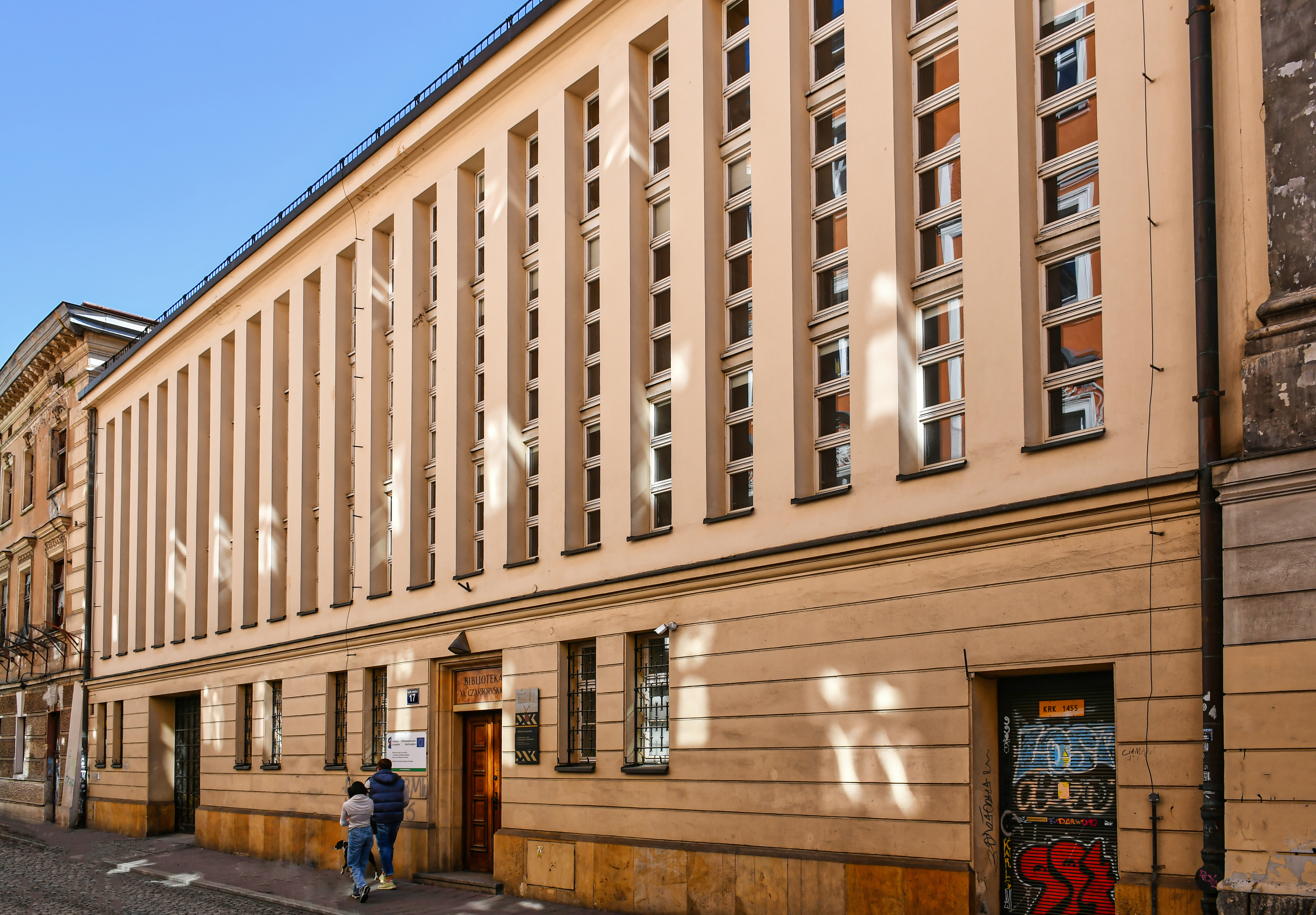
- 50°03′49.6″N 19°56′22.4″E
- Location: 17 św. Marka Street; Kraków; Poland
- Type: Research library
- Established: 18th century

Collection
- Size: 245,000
- Legal deposit: Yes

Other information
- Website: mnk.pl/en/branch/mnk-the-czartoryski-library

Designations

UNESCO World Heritage Site
- Type: Cultural
- Criteria: iv
- Designated: 1978
- Part of: Historic Centre of Kraków
- Reference no.: 29
- Region: Europe and North America

Historic Monument of Poland
- Designated: 1994-09-08
- Part of: Kraków historical city complex
- Reference no.: M.P. 1994 nr 50 poz. 418

The Princes Czartoryski Library (Polish: Biblioteka Książąt Czartoryskich) – often abbreviated to Czartoryski Library – is a branch of the National Museum in Kraków, located at 17 św. Marka Street in Old Town of Kraków, Poland.

It is a Polish foundation library established at the initiative of Prince Adam Kazimierz Czartoryski and Izabela Czartoryska nee Fleming in the second half of the 18th century.

== History ==
The library collection of Adam Kazimierz and Izabela Fleming Czartoryski was initially housed in the Blue Palace in Warsaw, belonging to the Czartoryski family. In 1770, the library contained 1,645 prints and manuscripts and published its first catalog. After 1783, the collection was moved to the Czartoryski Palace in Puławy. The Puławy collection was continuously expanded with works of national significance, including the library of Tadeusz Czacki, known as the Porycki Library, which also included archives related to King Stanisław August Poniatowski.

By 1830, the library had gathered around 70,000 prints and 3,000 manuscripts. After the fall of the November uprising and the confiscation of the property, the collection was dispersed and stored outside the borders of Russian Partition – in Sieniawa, Krasiczyn, Kórnik, Kraków, and Paris. The collection was reunified by Adam Jerzy's son, Prince Władysław, who in 1874 placed it in the former Municipal Arsenal, which the city of Kraków had donated for this purpose. The library became an integral part of the museum, which was officially opened in 1876.

During World War II, the library was closed, although Polish scholars and researchers still had access to its collections. The library's collections were looted, and only a part of them was recovered after the war. In 1950, the library and museum collections were placed under state care as a deposit at the National Museum in Kraków. A separate building was constructed for this purpose, designed by Marian Jaroszewski. The building was erected between 1958 and 1960 on the site of the rear wing of the Wodzicki Palace, which had been demolished in 1939, at 11 św. Jana Street. The relocation of the book collection to the new location was completed in 1961. The new building was designed by architect Marian Jaroszewski and built in 1958 and 1960.

In 1971, the Czartoryski Library was granted the status of a scientific library with a humanities profile.

On December 29, 2016, the Princes Czartoryski Foundation, the legal owner of the collections since 1991, transferred the library and other assets to the National Museum in Kraków.

== Collections ==
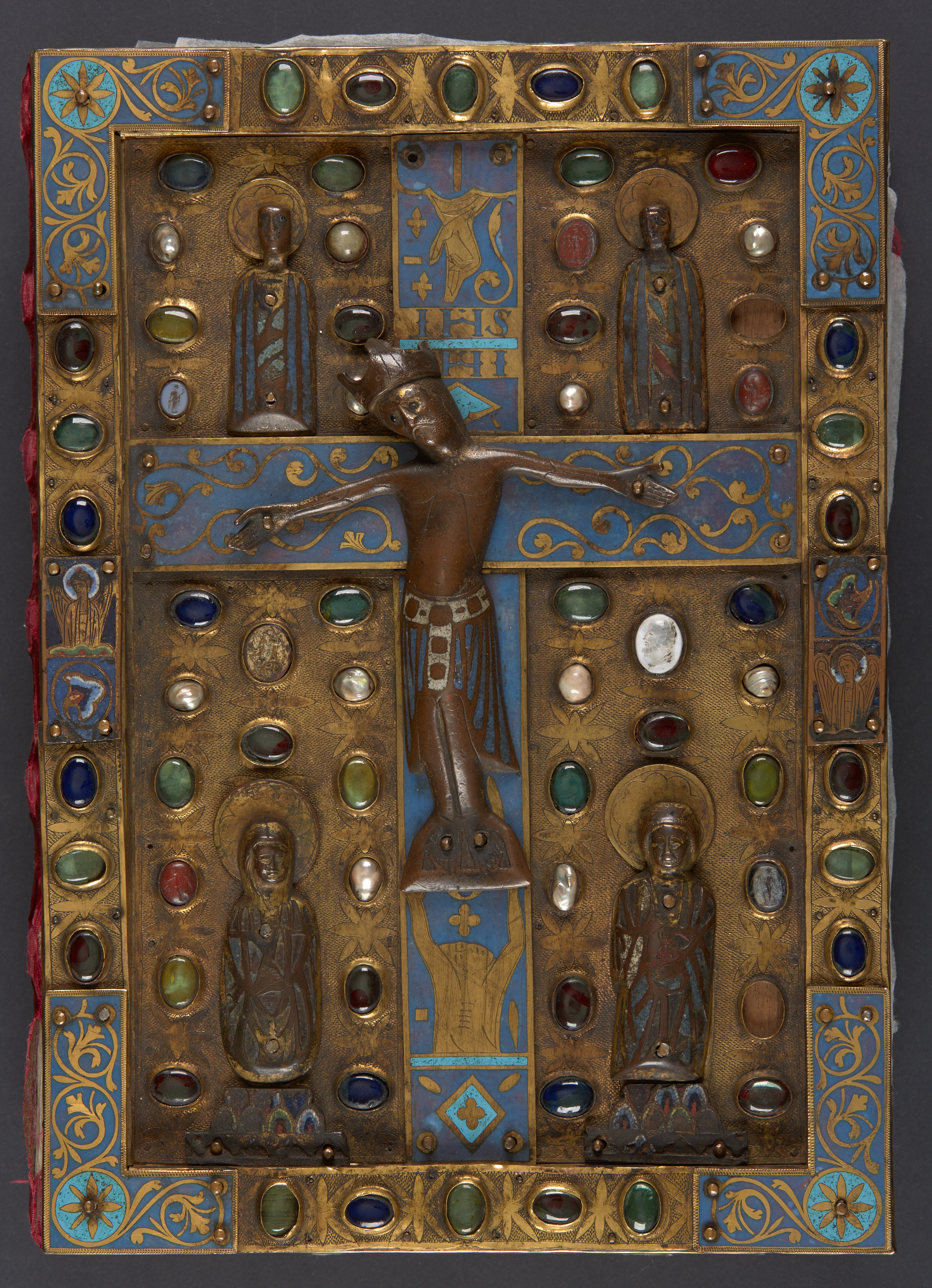
Binding of the 11th-century Golden Codex of Pułtusk

The collection of the Princes Czartoryski Library consists of over 245,000 literary monuments dating from the 10th to the 20th century. The library holds a diverse collection of rare manuscripts, incunabula, musicological works, calendars, maps, atlases, herbals, books, periodicals, and ephemera.

Since its inception, the library has been accompanied by illuminated medieval and early modern manuscripts, which were part of the museum collection of Princess Izabela Czartoryska. Among the illuminated manuscripts displayed in the library are works such as the King René's Tournament Book, the Golden Codex of Pułtusk, and the Pontifical of Bishop Erasmus Ciolek.

The library's collection also includes documents of historical significance, which testify to important events in the history of the Poland, such as the Privilege of Koszyce (1374), the Privilege of Jedlno (1430), acts of the Union of Horodło (1413) and the Prussian Homage (1525). The history of the Czartoryski family is recorded in their family documents, including the granting of the princely title to the Czartoryskis in 1442, the diploma of honorary citizenship of the city of Kraków for Władysław Czartoryski (1880), and materials documenting the museum activities of Izabela Czartoryska.

The library also holds memorabilia from prominent figures in culture, science, politics, and religion. Among these are autograph letters from Martin Luther, Nicolaus Copernicus, Ludwig van Beethoven, Adam Mickiewicz, and the first presidents of the United States.

== Gallery ==
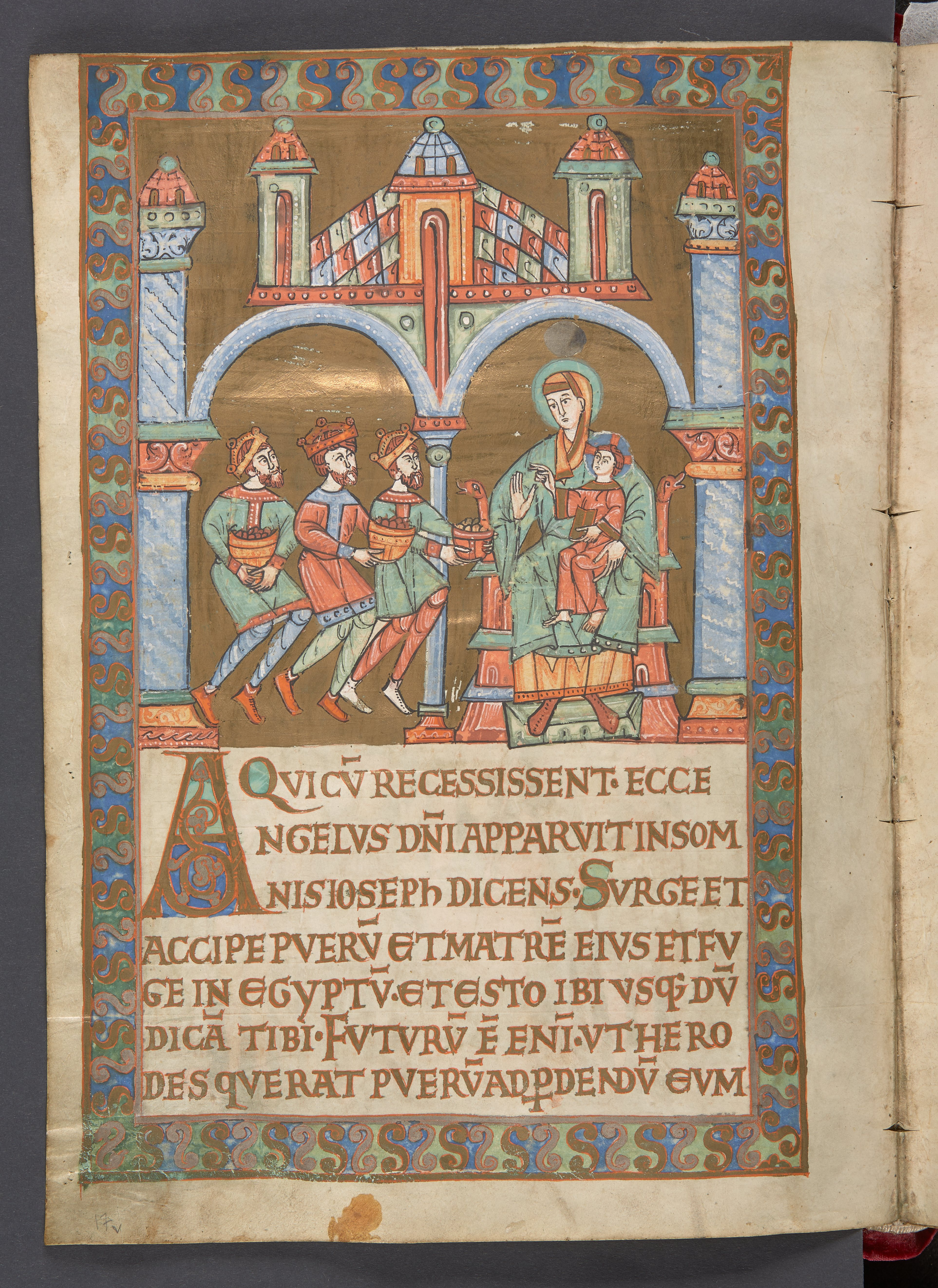
Codex aureus pultoviensis (The Golden Codex of Pułtusk), 80s of the 11th century

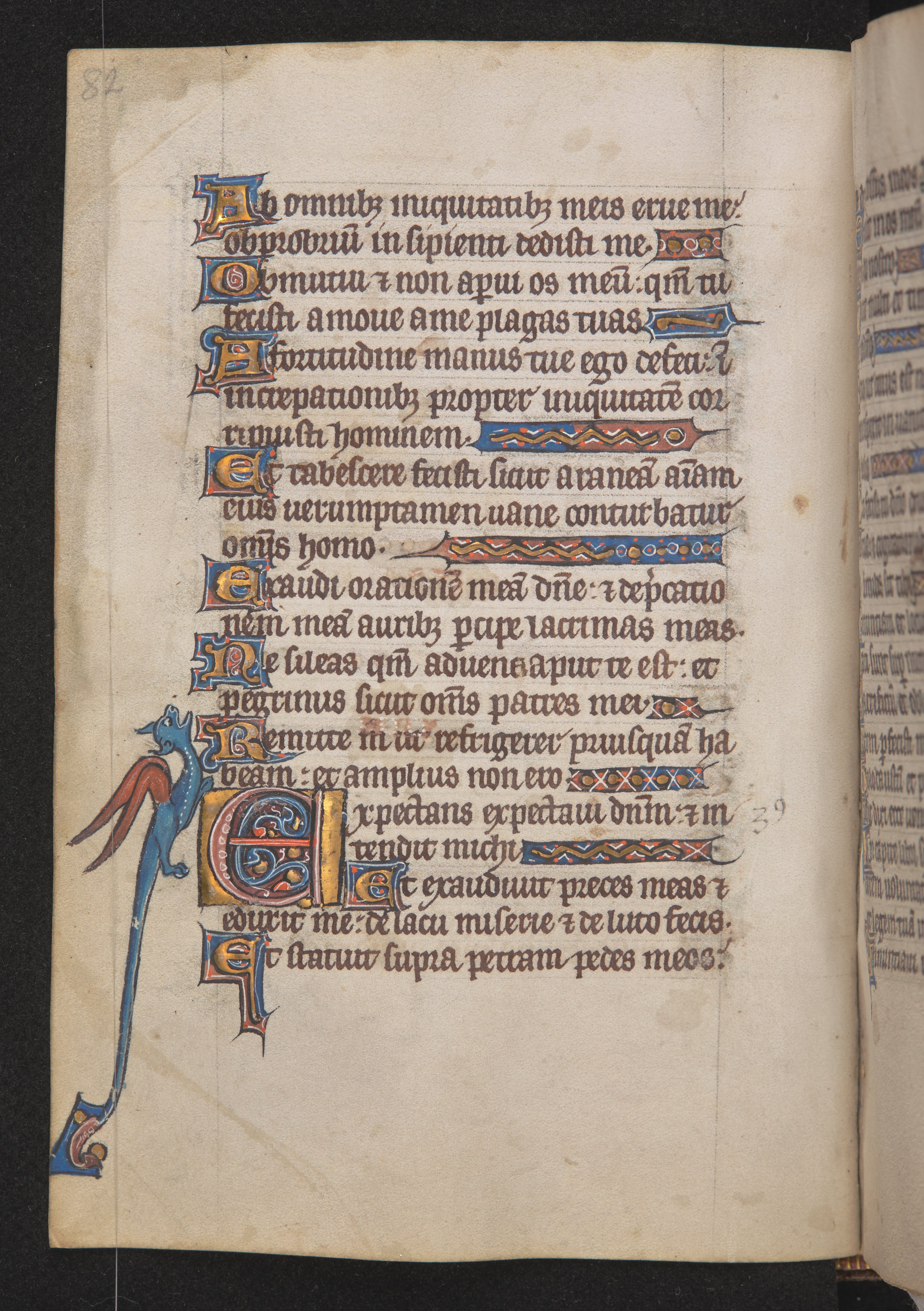
Psalterium-Horae, first quarter of the 14th century

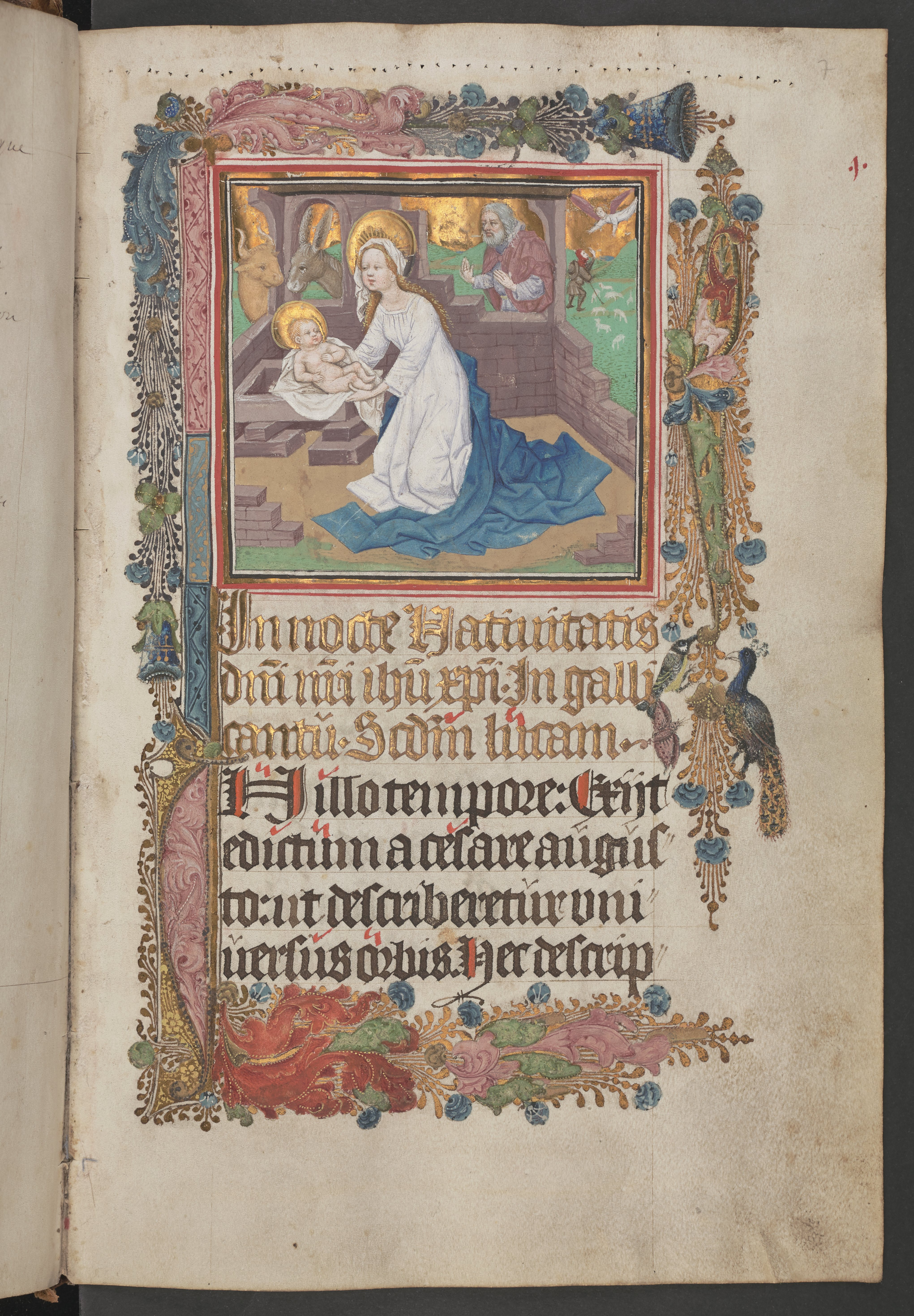
Lectiones Evangeliorum in diebus festis, Cologne, after 1461

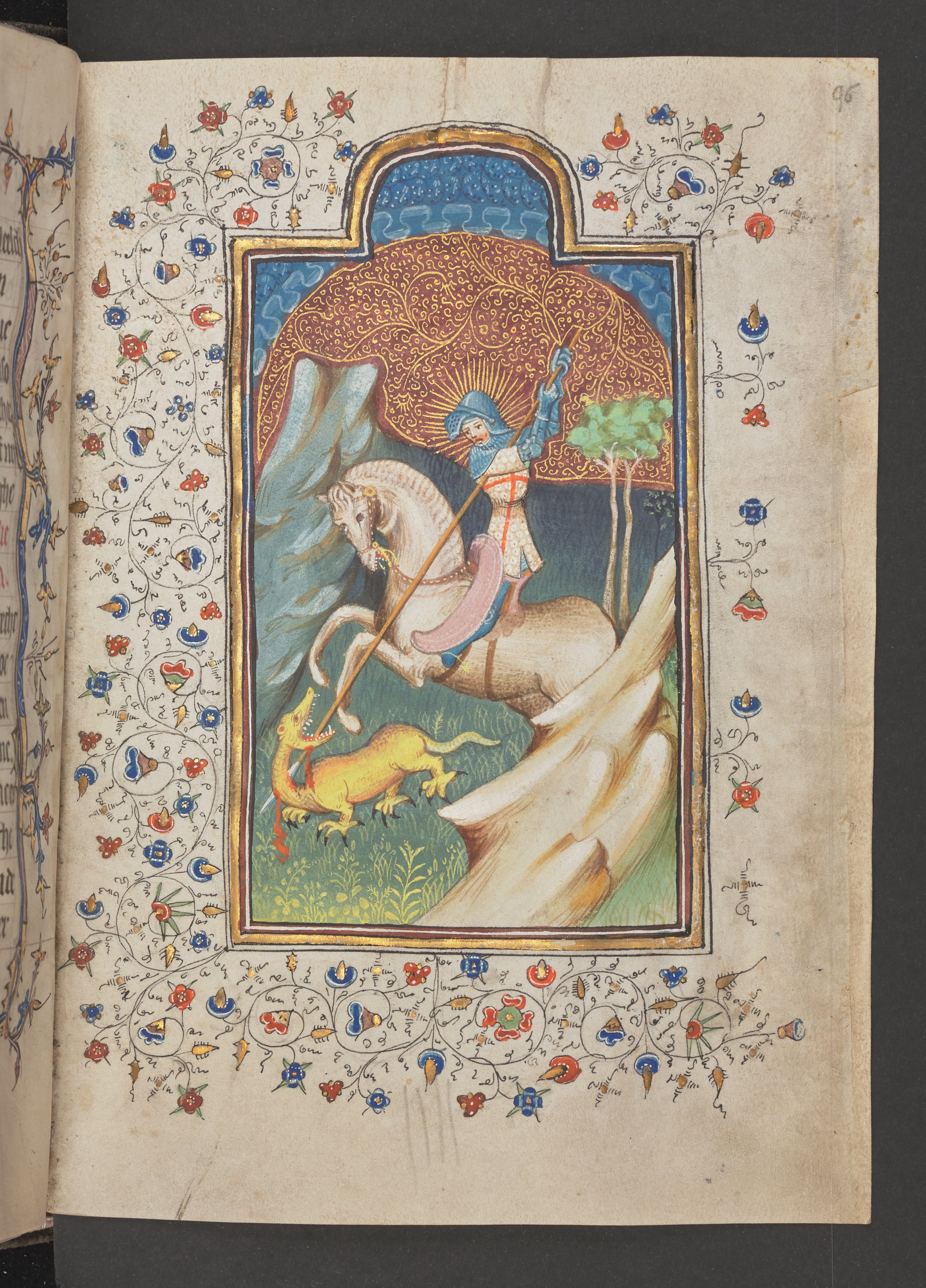
Getijdenboek, Bruges, first quarter of the 15th century

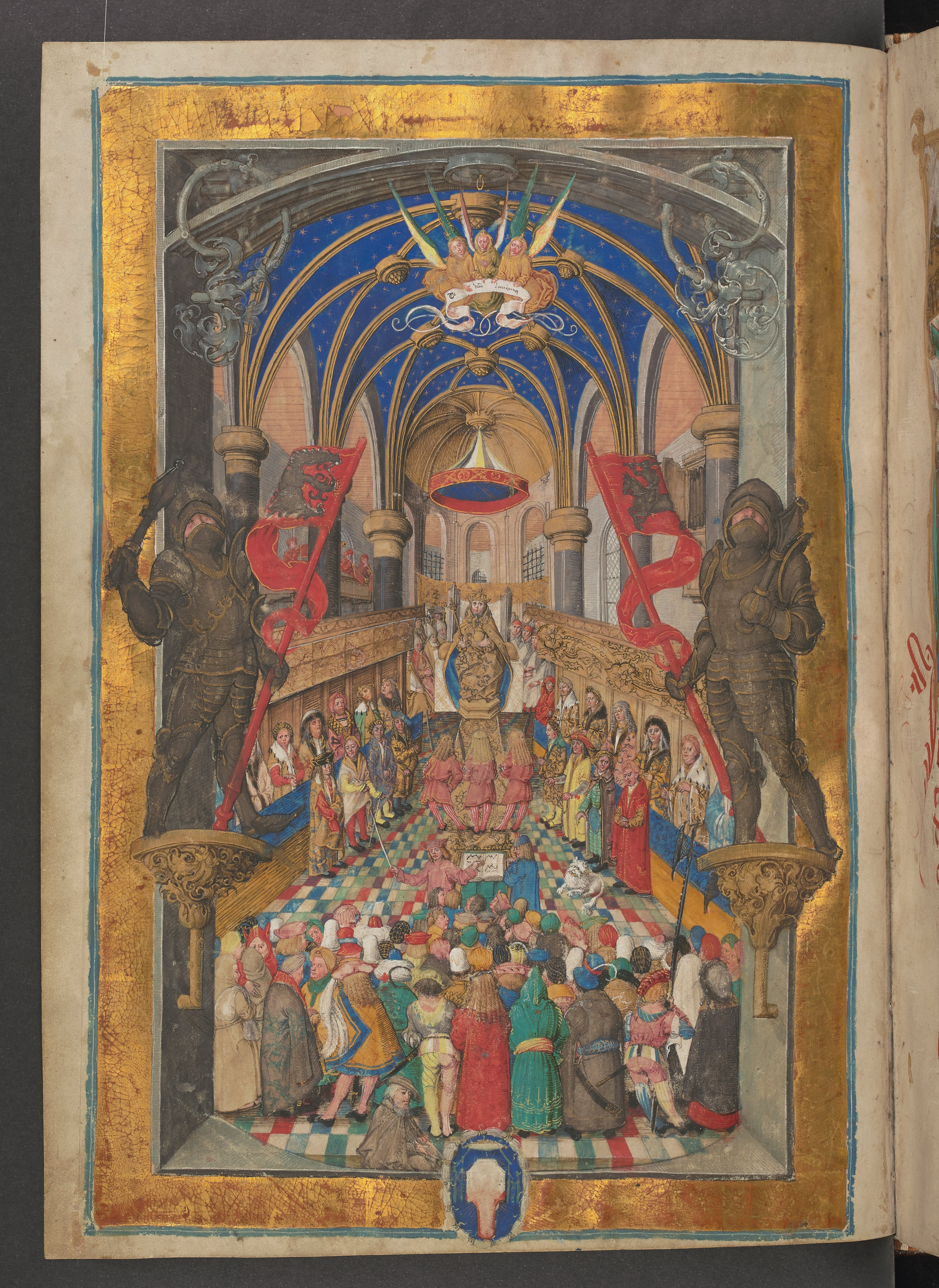
Pontificale cracoviense (The Pontifical of Bishop Erasmus Ciolek), Kraków, 1510-1515

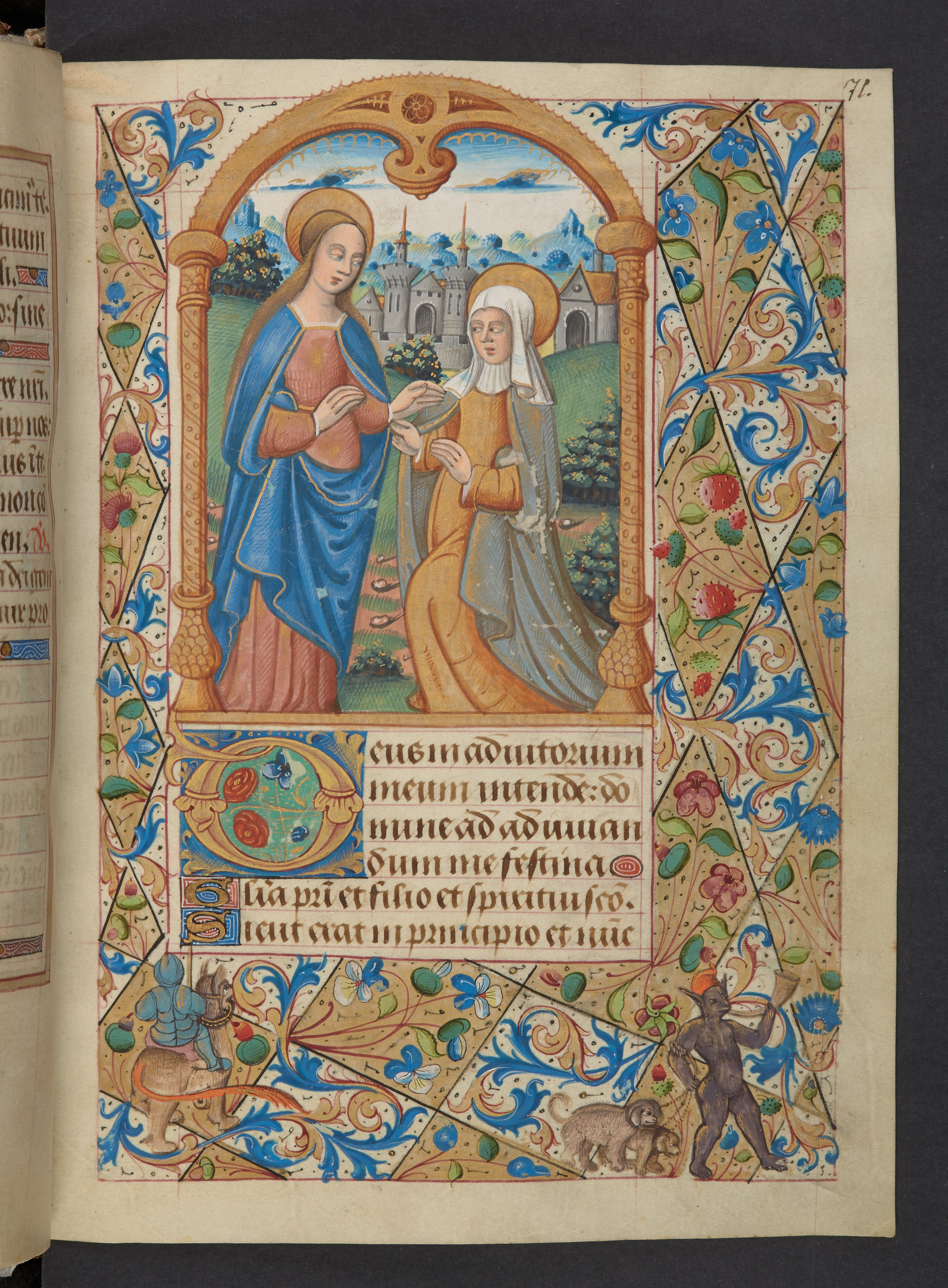
Livre d'heures, early 16th century

== See also ==
- Czartoryski Museum
- List of libraries in Poland
