= Jacobello di Bonomo =

Italian painter

Jacobello di Bonomo (active 1370–90) was an Italian painter, active in an early Renaissance style.

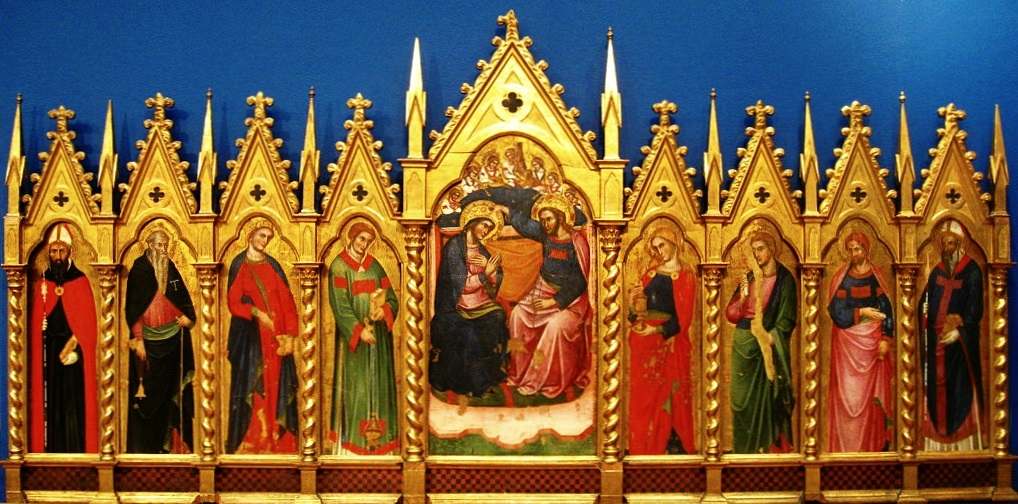
Coronation polyptych attributed to Bonomo, located in Czartoryski Museum, Poland

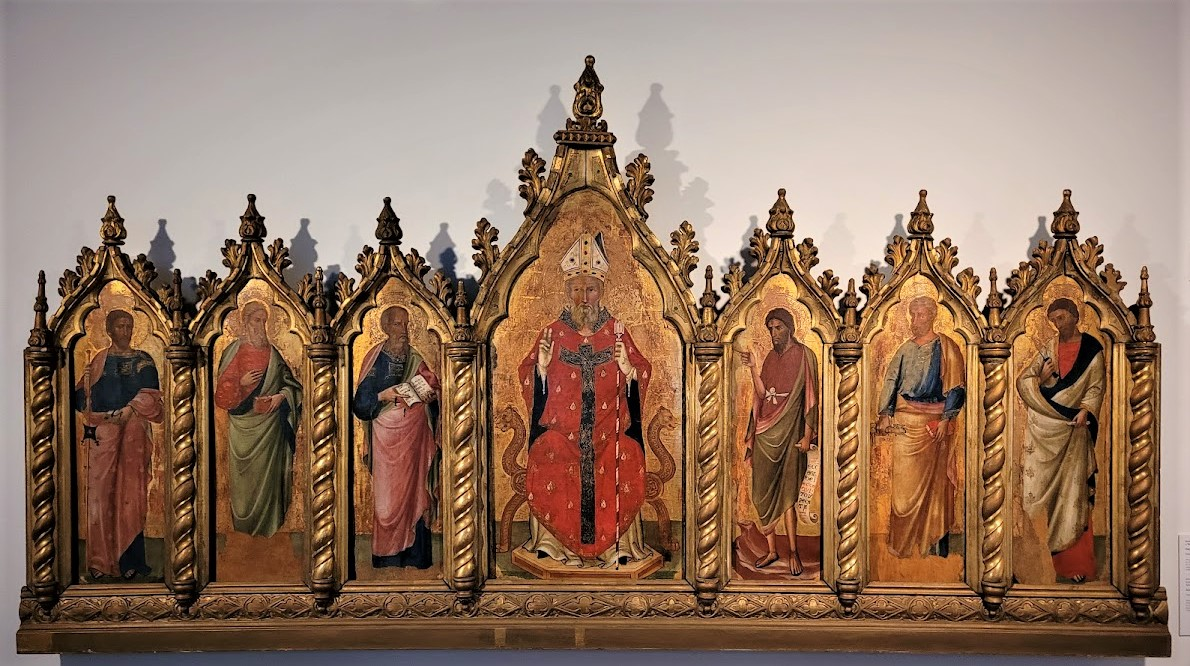
Polyptch from Dubí, attributed to Bonomo, located in Diocesan Museum in Litoměřice, Czech republic

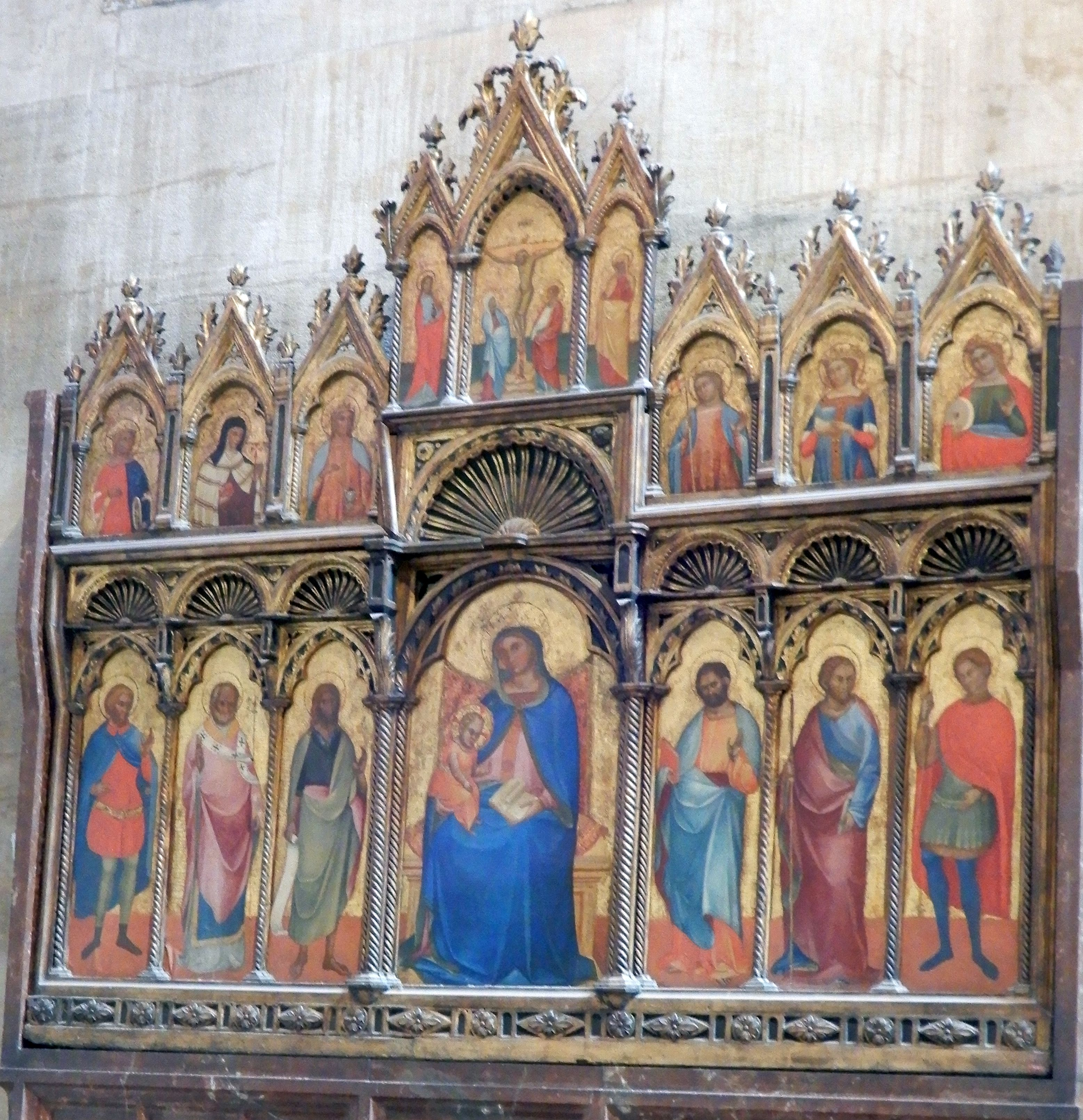
Virgin Mary polyptych, Jacobello di Bonomo; St. Vitus Cathedral, Prague

Little is known about his biography, and he appears to be referred to by various authors under different names, such as Jacobello or Jacometto del Fiore by the abbot Luigi Lanzi.

While he apparently trained in Venice, there are no identifiable works there. He is best known for a large and colorful polyptych of the Virgin and Child with 14 Saints (1385), located at Santarcangelo di Romagna. It is housed in the Civic Museum in the Palazzo Cenci of Santarcangelo. Some art critics suggest the influence of Lorenzo Veneziano. Other sources point to him working for or alongside Giovanni da Bologna.
