= Poland - The Year 1863 =

1864 painting by Jan Matejko

Poland – The Year 1863
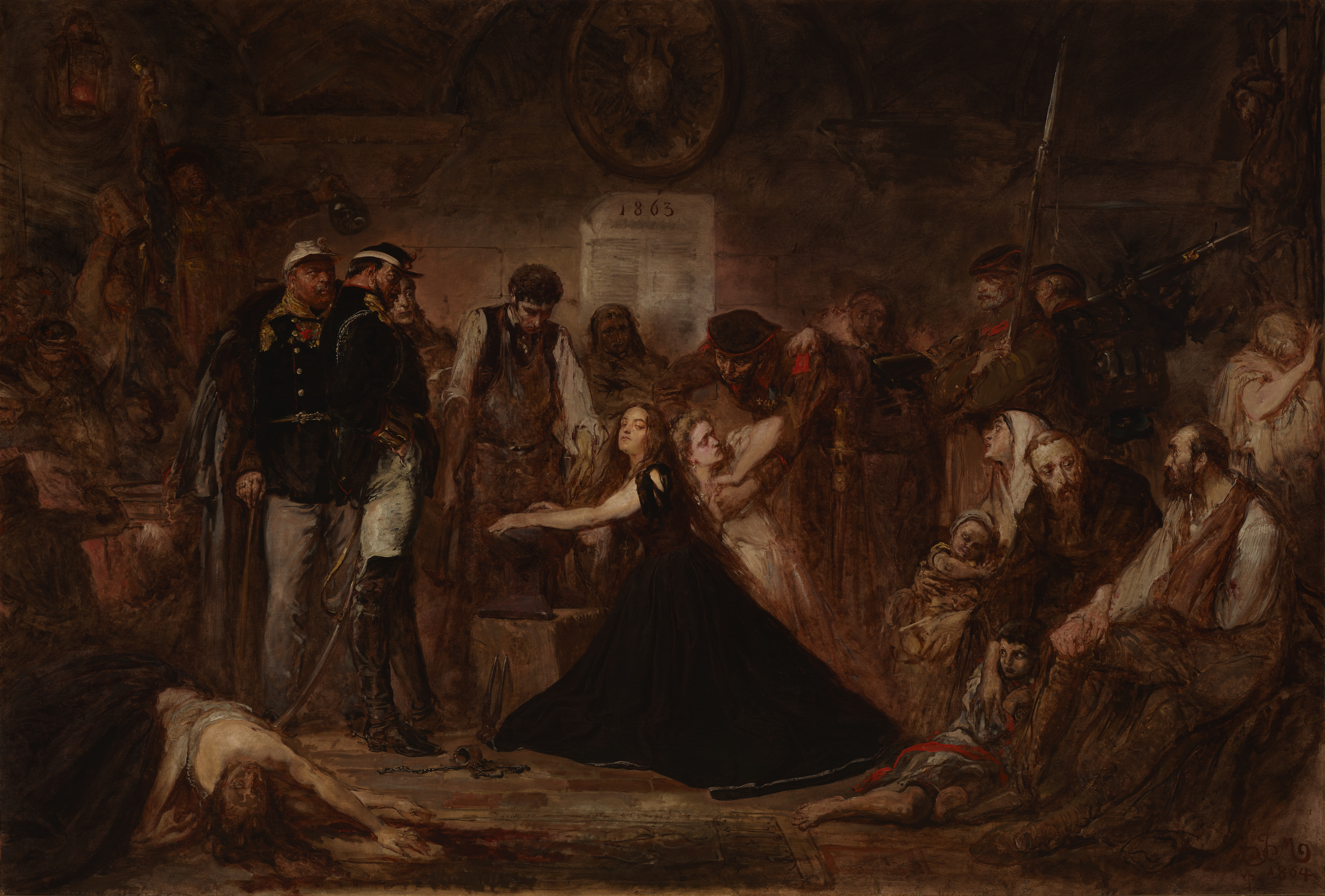
- Artist: Jan Matejko
- Year: 1864
- Medium: Oil-on-canvas
- Dimensions: 158 cm × 232 cm (62.2 in × 91.3 in)
- Location: Czartoryski Museum; Kraków

Poland – The Year 1863 (Polish – Polonia – Rok 1863) or The Shackling of Poland (Zakuwana Polska) is an unfinished oil on canvas painting by Jan Matejko, created in 1864 in response to his experiences during the January Uprising. It now lies in the Czartoryski Museum in Kraków.

== History ==
The artist did not find any opportunity to display the work in public and – afraid of repression and fearing for his and his family's safety – he hid it behind the stove in his house. It remained hidden there for several years and fell into the hands of the Czartoryski family.

== Iconography ==
Poland is represented as a young woman in a black dress torn at the shoulders and stretching her hands over an anvil in front of her to be shackled, with Ruthenia shown to her left as a woman in white ripped violently from her and Lithuania as a partially-naked woman lying in a pool of blood at the bottom left. The work shows Mikhail Muravyov, who had suppressed an uprising in Lithuania, and General Friedrich von Berg, who had suppressed another in the Kingdom of Poland, with Muravyov's sabre touching Lithuania.

In the centre background is a manifesto proclaiming the outbreak of the January Uprising, below the Kingdom of Poland's coat of arms, superimposed on the Russian imperial coat of arms. The overall scene occurs in a desecrated church full of Russian soldiers dressing up in its liturgical robes and drinking wine from its chalices. On the floor is a tombstone, symbolising the Poles' ancestors, whilst to the right, a group of soldiers supervise a crowd, including a wounded insurgent and a Capuchin friar, probably Poles awaiting exile to Siberia. In the right background, another soldier's bayonet pierces a crucifix on the wall as some Jews waited for the outcome.

== See also ==
- History of Poland
- List of Polish painters
