= The Family of Sigismund I of Poland =

Painting by Lucas Cranach the Younger

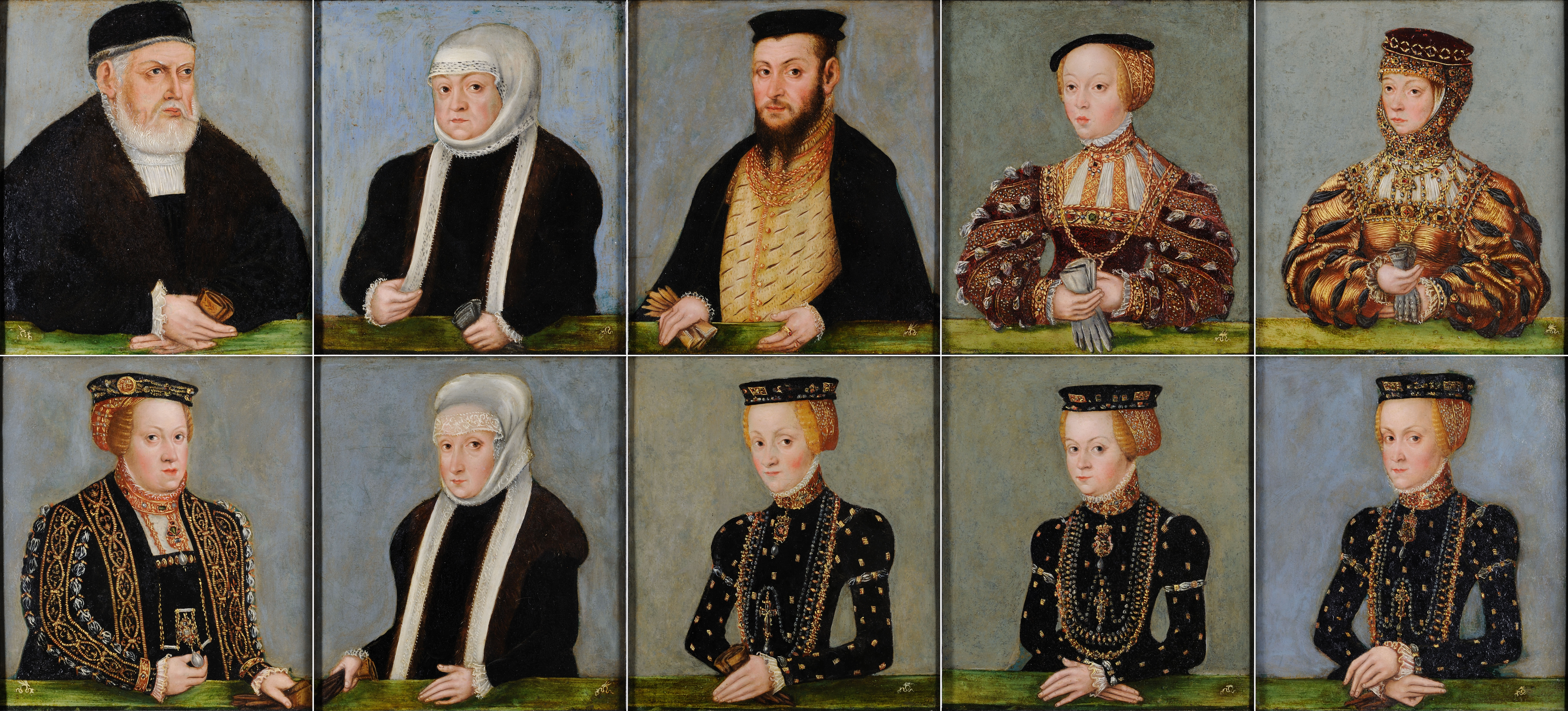
- Artist: Lucas Cranach the Younger
- Year: c. 1553–1555
- Medium: Oil on copper
- Dimensions: each miniature: 19.5 cm × 17.5 cm (7.6 in × 6.8 in)
- Location: Czartoryski Museum, Kraków

The Family of Sigismund I of Poland or Portrait Miniatures of the Jagiellon Family (Polish: Miniatury portretowe rodziny Jagiellonów) is a set of ten portrait miniatures of the Jagiellonian dynasty, produced in the studio of Lucas Cranach the Younger during Bona Sforza's time as queen in Poland after she had married Sigismund I of Poland, c. 1553–1555. They are all now in the Czartoryski Museum.

From left to right, the top row shows Sigismund I the Old of Poland, Bona Sforza, Sigismund II Augustus of Poland (1520–1572), Sigismund II's first wife Elizabeth of Austria, Queen of Poland and Sigismund II's second wife Barbara Radziwiłł. From left to right the bottom row shows Sigismund II's third wife Catherine of Austria (1533–1572) and his sisters Isabella (1519–1559), Catherine (1526–1583), Sophia (1522–1575) and Anna (1523–1596).
