= Lorenzo Veneziano =

Italian painter (active 1356–1372)

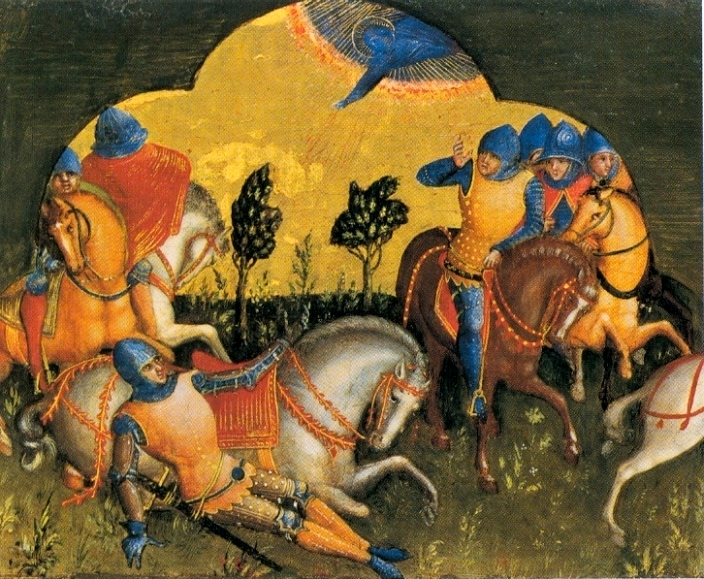
Conversion of Saint Paul

Lorenzo Veneziano ('Lorenzo the Venetian') (active 1356–1372) was an important painter in Venice during the second half of the 14th century. He was the first painter of the Venetian school who commenced the move away from the Byzantine models preferred by the Venetians towards the Gothic style. His work had an important influence on the next generation of Venetian painters.

== Life ==
The artist's activity is confirmed during the period of 1356 to 1372. Art historians have gradually abandoned the view that the artist should be identified with the painter who signed as 'Lorenzo pentor di S Marina' in 1379.

It was formerly believed that the artist trained with Paolo Veneziano but there is no evidence to support this view.

He appears to have worked extensively outside the Venetian area, possibly because he was not successful in getting commissions from the Venetian Republic.

== Work ==
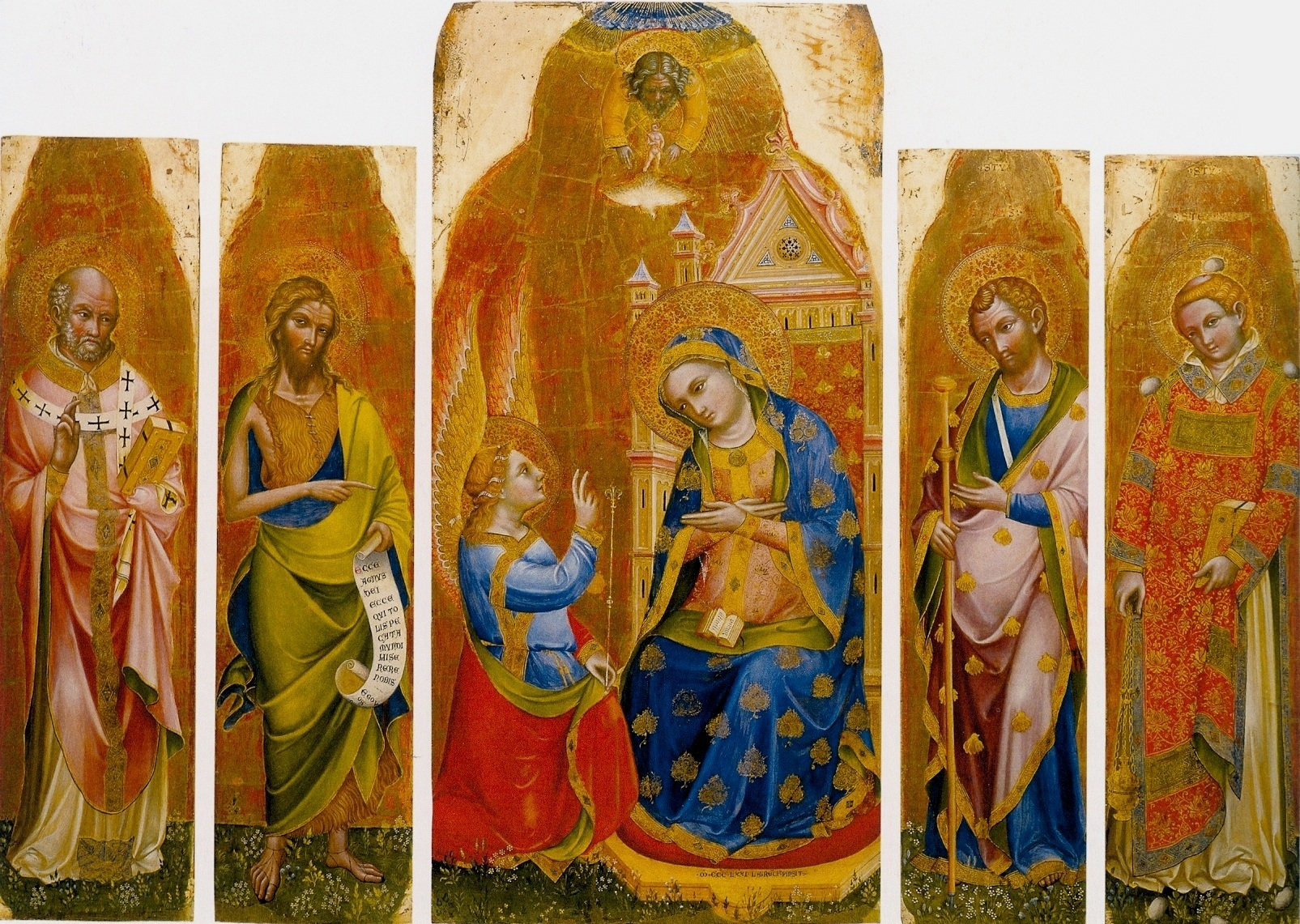
Annunciation Polyptych

The lack of biographical data on the artist have made it difficult to assess his evolution and influences. His earliest signed work is an altarpiece referred to as the Annunciation Polyptych or the Lion Polyptych painted for the high altar of the church of Sant' Antonio di Castello (now in the Gallerie dell'Accademia of Venice). It is dated 1357. An inscription on the polyptych claims it was commissioned by the patrician Domenico Lion. The altarpiece represents the Annunciation with a portrait of the donor Domenico Lion, the Christ in benediction, and figures of various Saints. The scene of the Annunciation on the central table and the Prophets of the upper register manifest an increased modern sensibility as well as a receptiveness to new artistic directions already present in Piedmont. Various features of the Annunciation Polyptych seem to point to Lorenzo's direct knowledge of Venetian and Emilian models. These include the expressive intensity of the faces, the dynamic articulation of the drapes and the abandonment of the Byzantine manner of letting the dark base colors shine through the flesh of persons. Lorenzo favored a chromatic quality with refined timbres and delicate nuances of the local tone.

The Gallerie dell'Accademia of Venice also possesses an altarpiece by Lorenzo executed in 1371. It originally consisted of five panels, on which an Annunciation and six figures of saints were painted, but it is now broken up into separate works. Also by Lorenzo is Saviour Enthroned with Saints and Angels dated 1369 in the Museo Correr, Venice.

Lorenzo had an important impact on painting in Venice in the last decades of the 14th century. Artists such as Guglielmo Veneziano, Giovanni da Bologna, Catarino Veneziano, Stefano di Sant'Agnese, in particular, and Jacobello di Bonomo, to a more limited extent, were influenced by his style.
