= Stefano Veneziano =

Italian painter

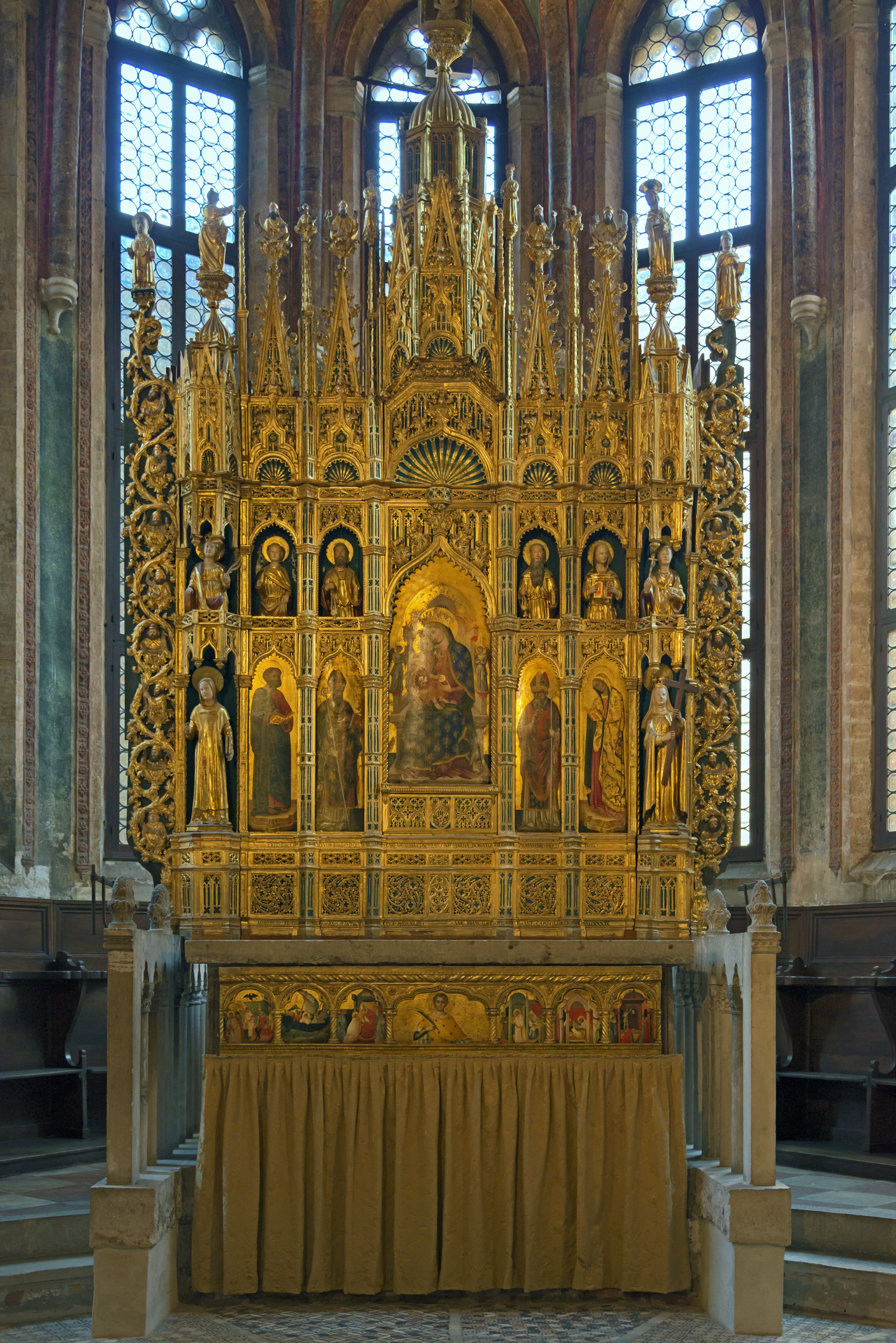
Polittico della Vigine San Zaccaria, Venice

Madonna enthroned with Baby Jesus Correr Museum

Stefano Veneziano, or Stefano di Sant'Agnese was a 14th-century Italian painter from Venice, active 1369–1386. He was a contemporary of Lorenzo Veneziano and Niccolo Semitecolo, and painted in the same manner. He signed his works STEFAN PLEBANUS SANCTAE AGNETIS, and is hence supposed to have been parish priest (piovano) of Sant'Agnese, Venice; he flourished in the latter part of the 14th century. A Coronation of the Virgin in the Gallerie dell'Accademia of Venice is ascribed to him. He painted the central part of the polyptych of the Virgin in San Zaccaria, Venice.
