= Princes Czartoryski Foundation =

Polish museum foundation

Princes Czartoryski Foundation was established by Prince Adam Karol Czartoryski in 1991 to administer the Czartoryski Museum under the auspices of the National Museum in Kraków, Poland.

Through 2016, the Princes Czartoryski Foundation was the controlling entity of the collections. The Foundation, however, now exists in name only: on 29 December 2016, its founder and president, Prince Adam Karol Czartoryski, sold for 100 million euro to the Polish Government, all the Foundation's buildings (arsenal, monastery, museum, and library), with all their contents, valued at some 3 billion euros.
