= Czartoryski Museum =

Museum in Kraków, Poland

Coordinates: 50°03′52.8″N 19°56′23.8″E

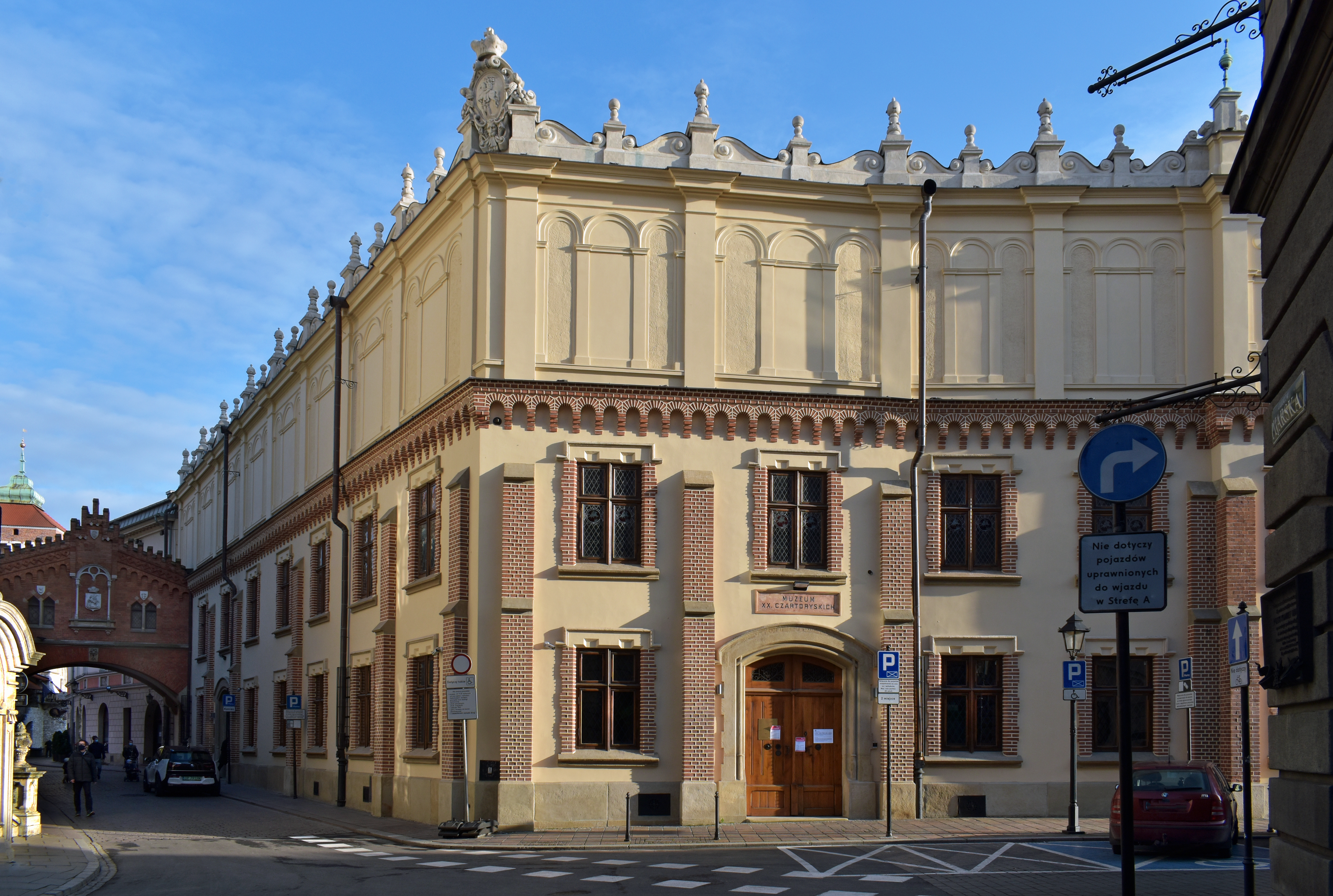
- Established: 1878
- Location: Pijarska Street 15; Kraków; Poland
- Type: National museum
- Collections: Ancient art, European painting, Decorative arts, Applied arts, Military
- Collection size: 336,000
- Visitors: 1,170,074 (2025)
- Curator: dr Katarzyna Płonka-Bałus
- Website: mnk.pl/en/branch/mnk-czartoryski-museum

UNESCO World Heritage Site
- Type: Cultural
- Criteria: iv
- Designated: 1978
- Part of: Historic Centre of Kraków
- Reference no.: 29
- Region: Europe and North America

Historic Monument of Poland
- Designated: 1994-09-08
- Part of: Kraków historical city complex
- Reference no.: M.P. 1994 nr 50 poz. 418

The Princes Czartoryski Museum (Polish: Muzeum Książąt Czartoryskich [muˈzɛ.um ˈkɕɔ̃ʐɔnt t͡ʂartɔˈrɨskʲix]) – often abbreviated to Czartoryski Museum – is a historic museum in Kraków, Poland, and one of the country's oldest museums. The initial collection was formed in 1796 in Puławy by Princess Izabela Czartoryska. The Museum officially opened in 1878. It is now a division of the National Museum in Kraków.

The Puławy collection was partly destroyed after the November 1830 Uprising and the confiscation of the Czartoryski properties. Most of the Museum holdings, however, were saved and moved to Paris, where they reposed at the Hôtel Lambert. In 1870 Prince Władysław Czartoryski decided to move the collections to Kraków, where they arrived in 1876.

The most renowned painting at the Museum is one of Leonardo da Vinci's best-known works, the Lady with an Ermine. Other highlights include two works by Rembrandt; several antiquities, including sculptures; Renaissance tapestries and decorative arts; and paintings by Hans Holbein the Younger, Jacob Jordaens, Luca Giordano, Pieter Brueghel the Younger, Dieric Bouts, Joos van Cleve, Lorenzo Lotto, Lucas Cranach the Younger, Lorenzo Monaco, Andrea Mantegna, Alessandro Magnasco, and the Master of the Female Half-Lengths.

The Museum's main facility closed for restoration in 2010 and reopened in December 2019. During this time, parts of the collection were displayed at other venues.

== Royal collections ==
Princess Izabela Czartoryska founded the museum in Puławy to preserve Polish heritage in keeping with her motto, "The Past to the Future." The first objects in her "Temple of Memory" of 1796 were trophies commemorating the victory against the Turks at the Battle of Vienna in 1683.

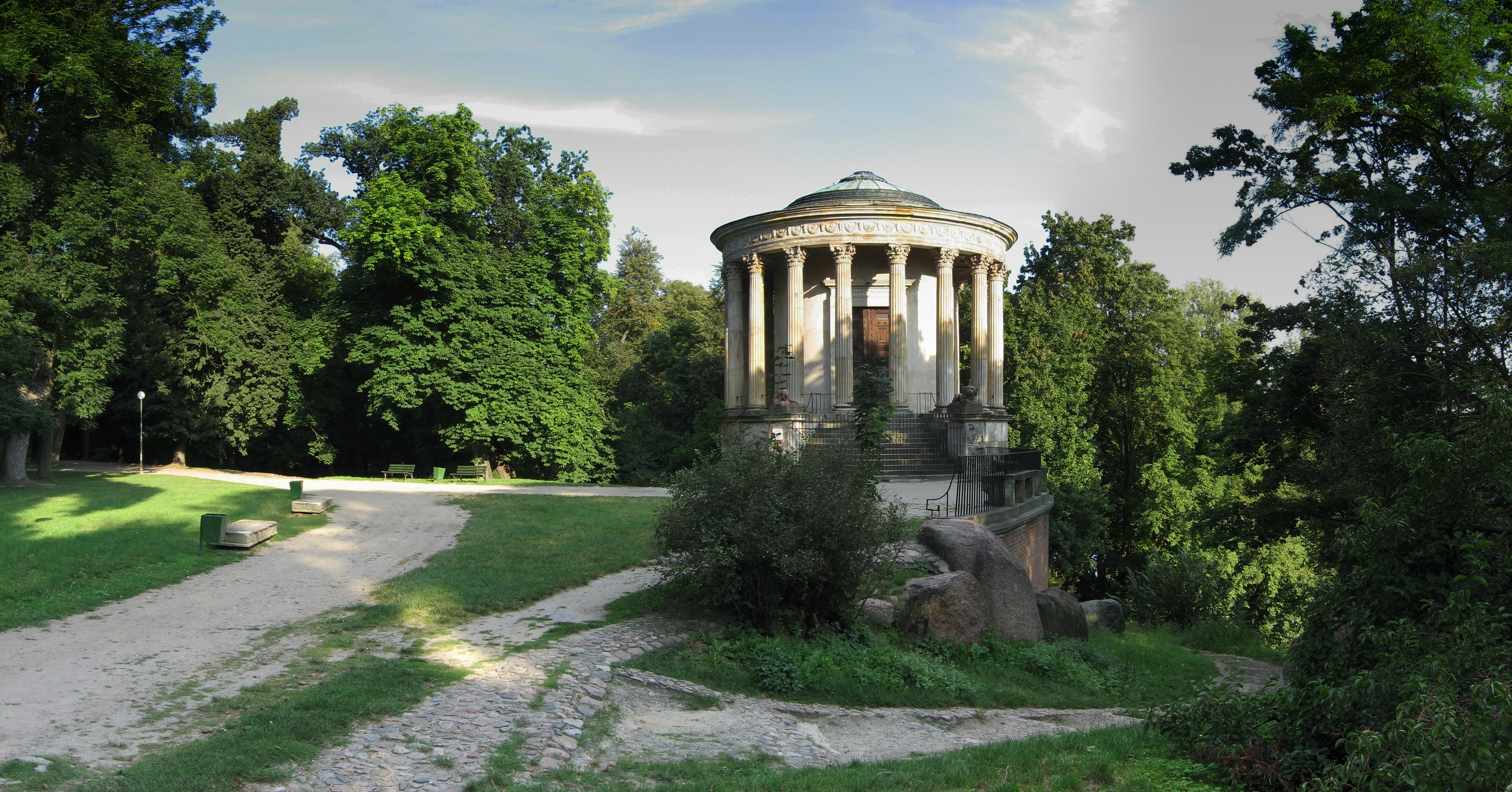
Temple of the Sibyl, or "Temple of Memory"

The Museum collections feature historical artifacts from the recovered treasures of the Wawel Cathedral, the Royal Castle and other objects donated by Polish noble families (szlachta). Izabela also bought the treasures of the Duke of Brabant, including his books which were considered a particular highlight of the collection. Influenced by the Romantic artistic movement, she also acquired objects of sentimental significance that represented the glory and misery of human life. Among these were Shakespeare's chair, fragments from the alleged graves of Romeo and Juliet in Verona, ashes of El Cid and Ximena from the Cathedral of Burgos, and relics of Abelard and Heloise, and Petrarch and his Laura. The library's book collection was later enhanced with Tadeusz Czacki's collection, which included archives of Stanisław August Poniatowski, last king of Poland.

In 1798 Izabela's son, Prince Adam Jerzy Czartoryski, traveled to Italy and acquired Lady with an Ermine by Leonardo da Vinci, Raphael's Portrait of a Young Man, and many Roman antiquities. However, Prince Adam Jerzy was always more a politician than an art-collector. After the failed November Uprising in 1830 he was exiled from Congress Poland, then ruled by Russian Empire. He established himself in Paris, and in 1843 bought The Hotel Lambert, which became both the center of operations for the exiled Czartoryski magnate, and the Living Museum of Poland. All the objects from the first museum were displayed in Paris. Books collection scattered and for decades its parts were stored out of Russian partition: in Kórnik, Sieniawa and in Paris.

Upon Prince Adam Jerzy's death, his younger son, Prince Władysław, took over the museum. A born collector, he and his sister, Princess Izabela Działyńska, expanded the collection to include: the Polonaise carpet, Etruscan and Greek vases, Roman and Egyptian antiquities, and other types of arms and armours, as well as Limoges enamels. At the 1865 Exposition des Arts Decoratifs in Paris, Władysław created a Polish room to exhibit the famous carpet and other parts of his collection.

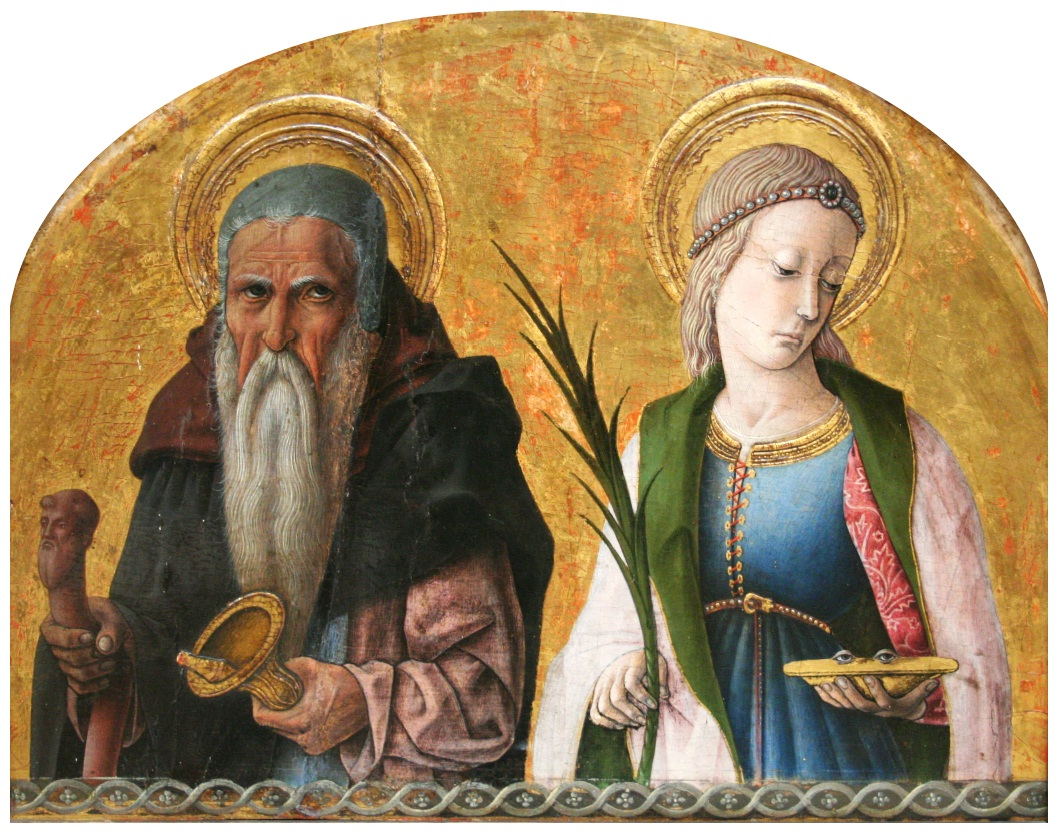
Carlo Crivelli, Saints Anthony and Lucia (c. 1470)

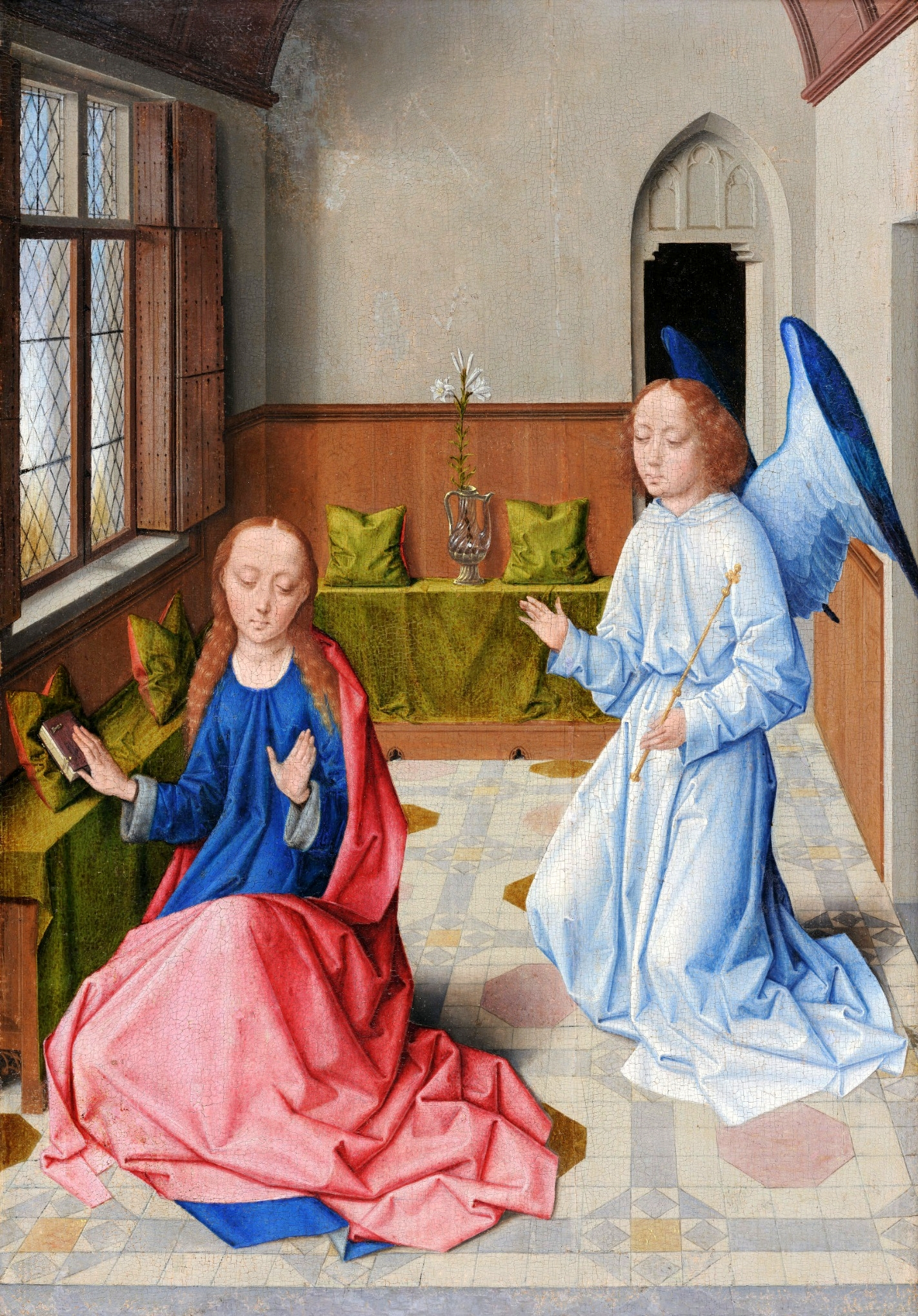
Dieric Bouts, The Annunciation (1475)

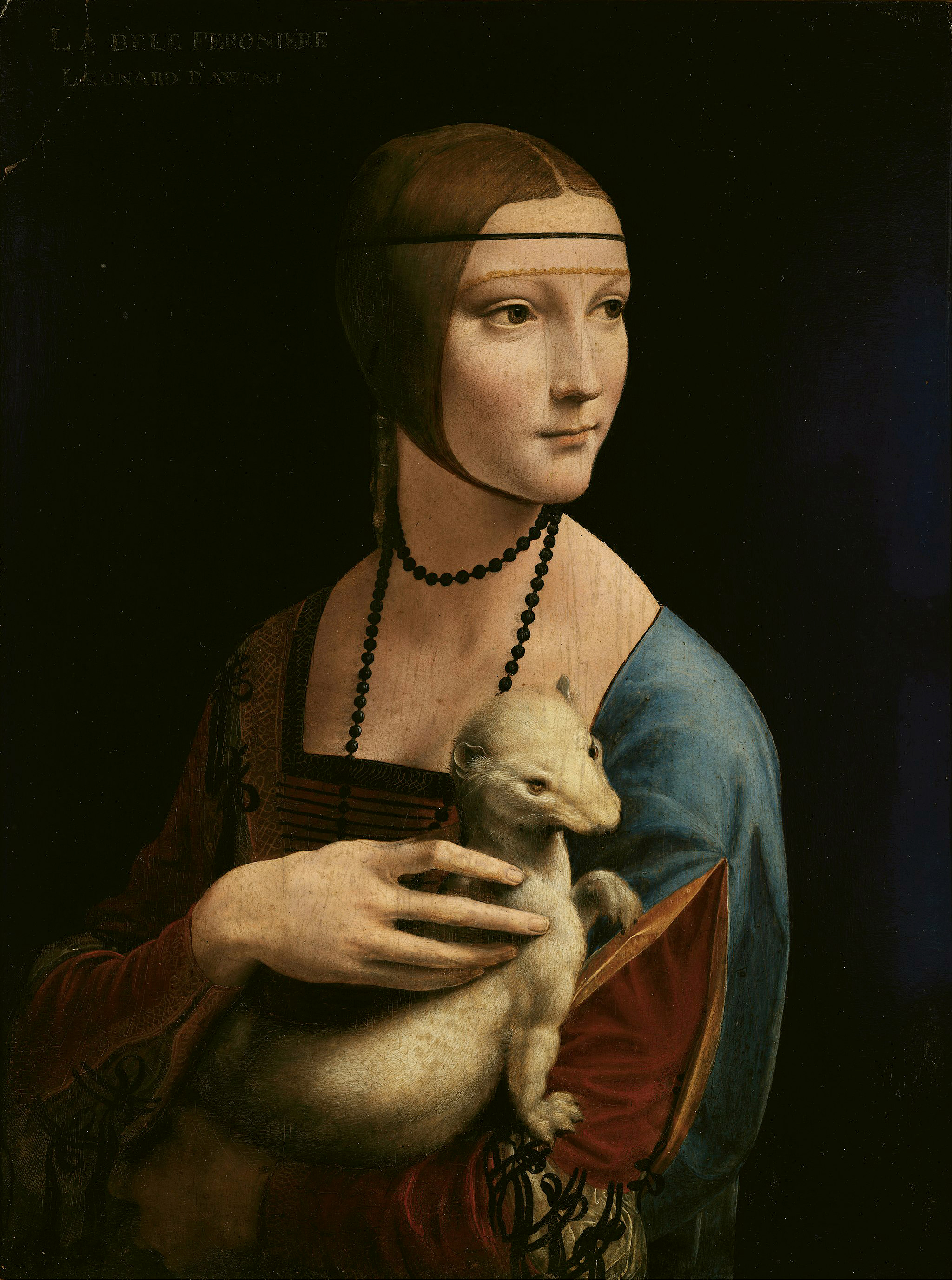
Leonardo da Vinci, Lady with an Ermine (1490)

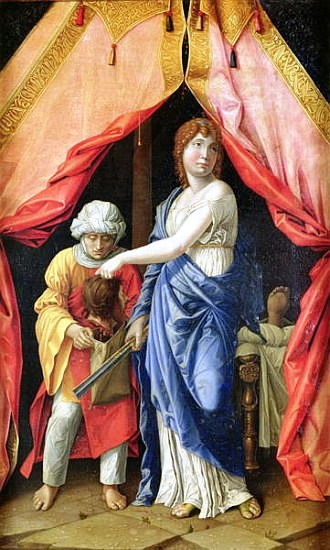
Andrea Mantegna, Judith (c. 1495)

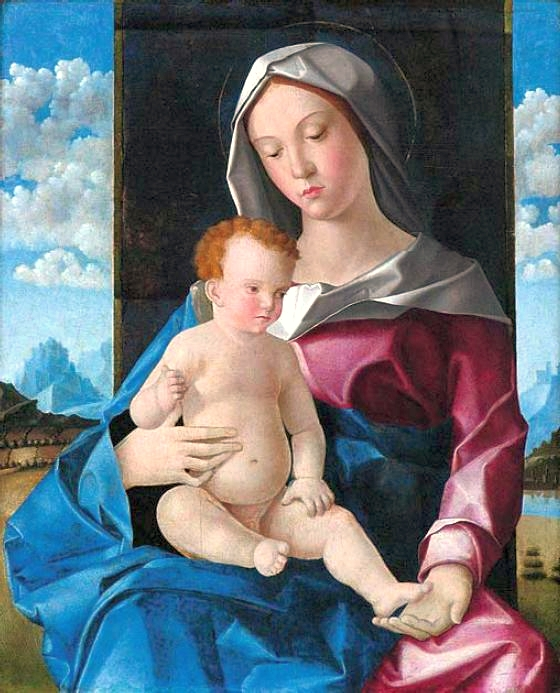
Vincenzo Catena, Madonna and Child (1510)

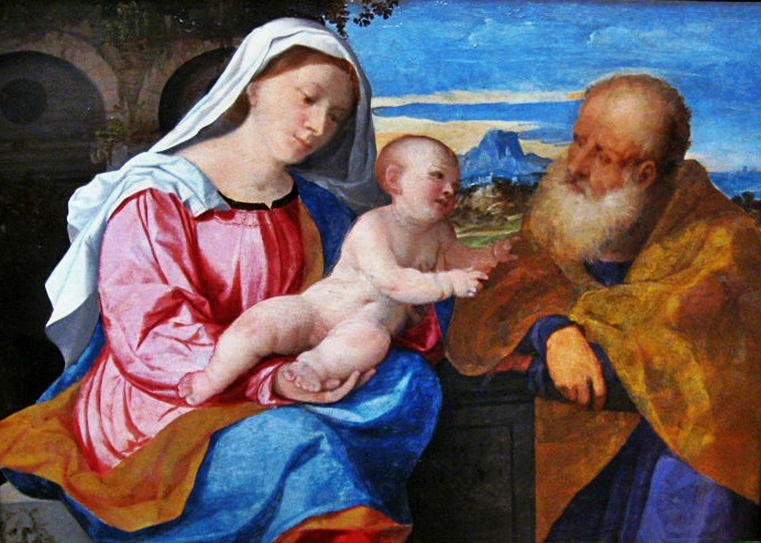
Palma Vecchio, The Holy Family (c. 1514–1515)

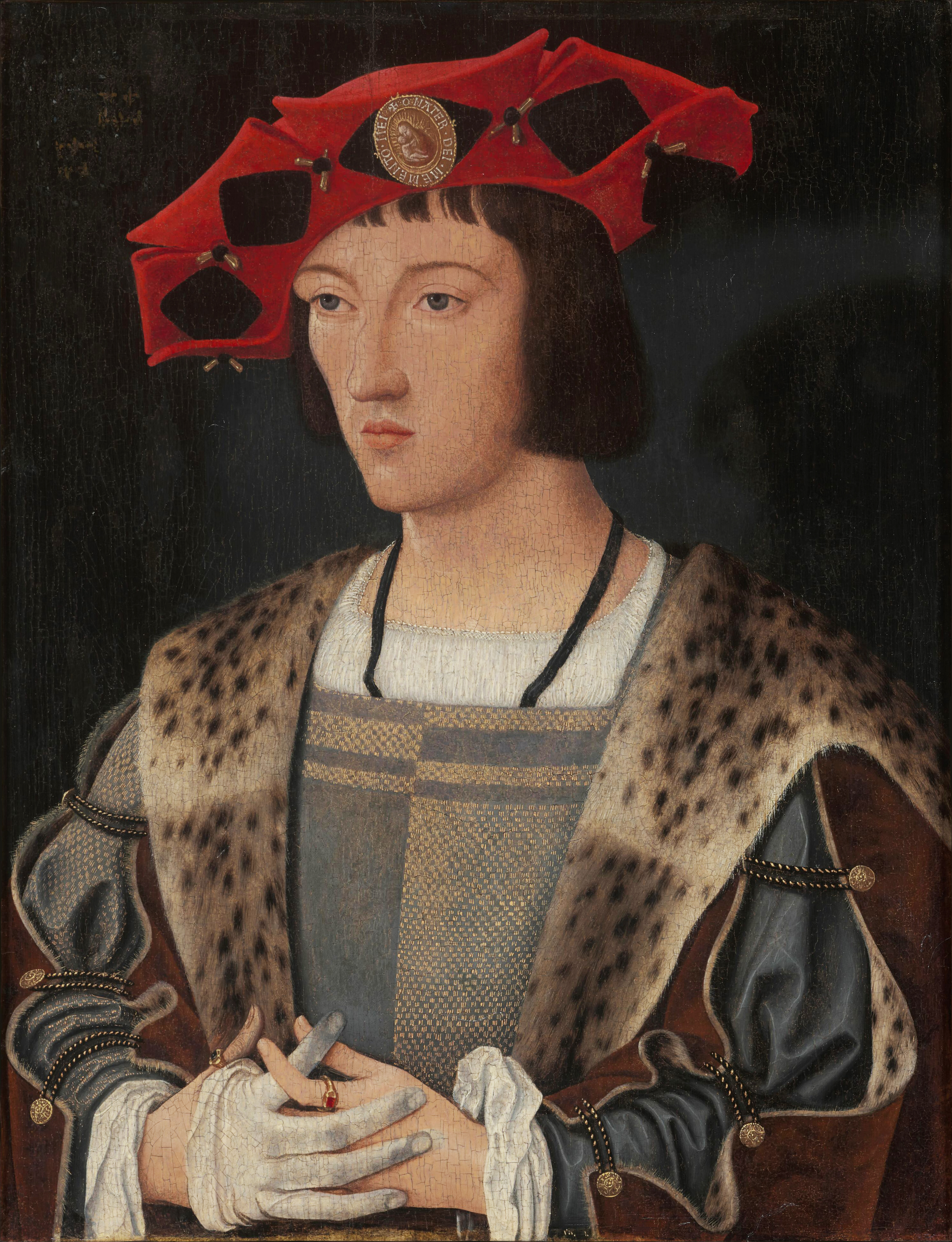
Jan Mostaert, Portrait of a Courtier (c. 1520)

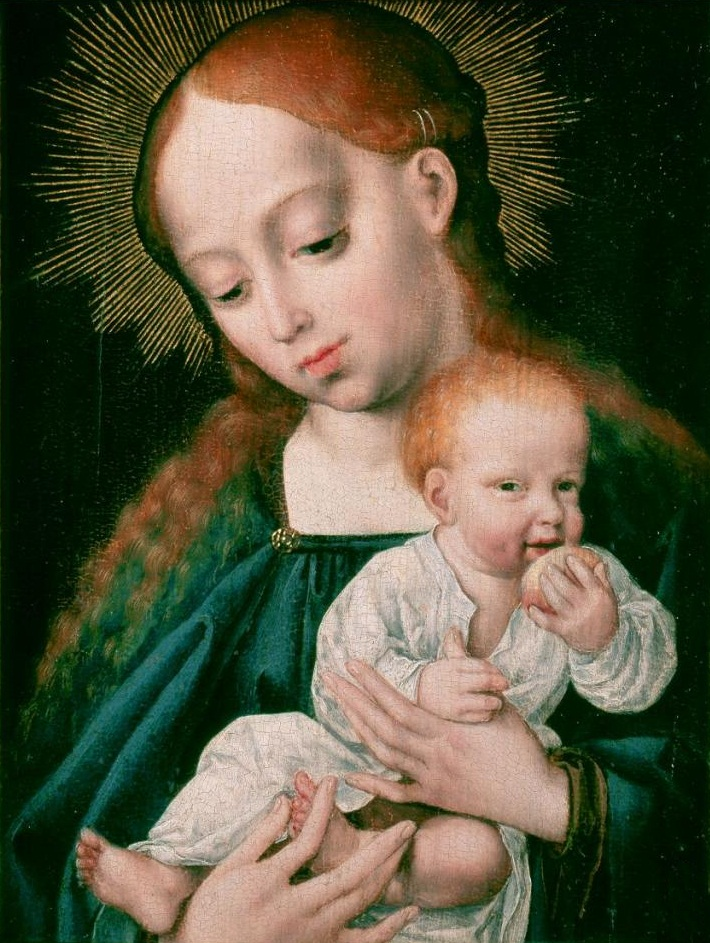
Joos van Cleve, Madonna and Child (c. 1525–1530)

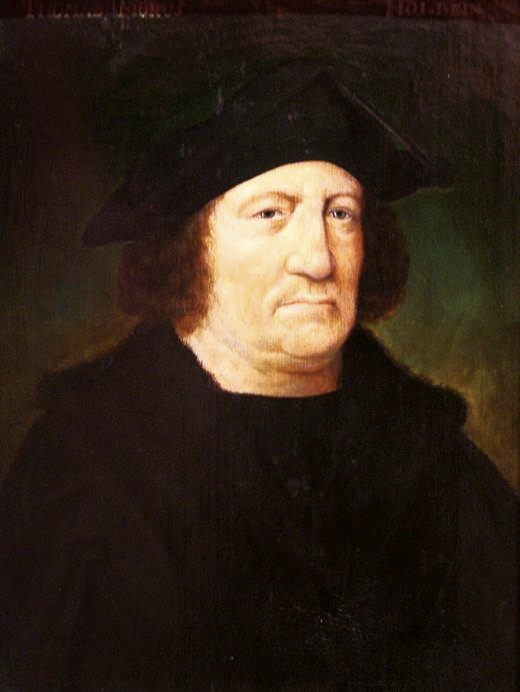
Hans Holbein, Portrait of a Man (c. 1530)

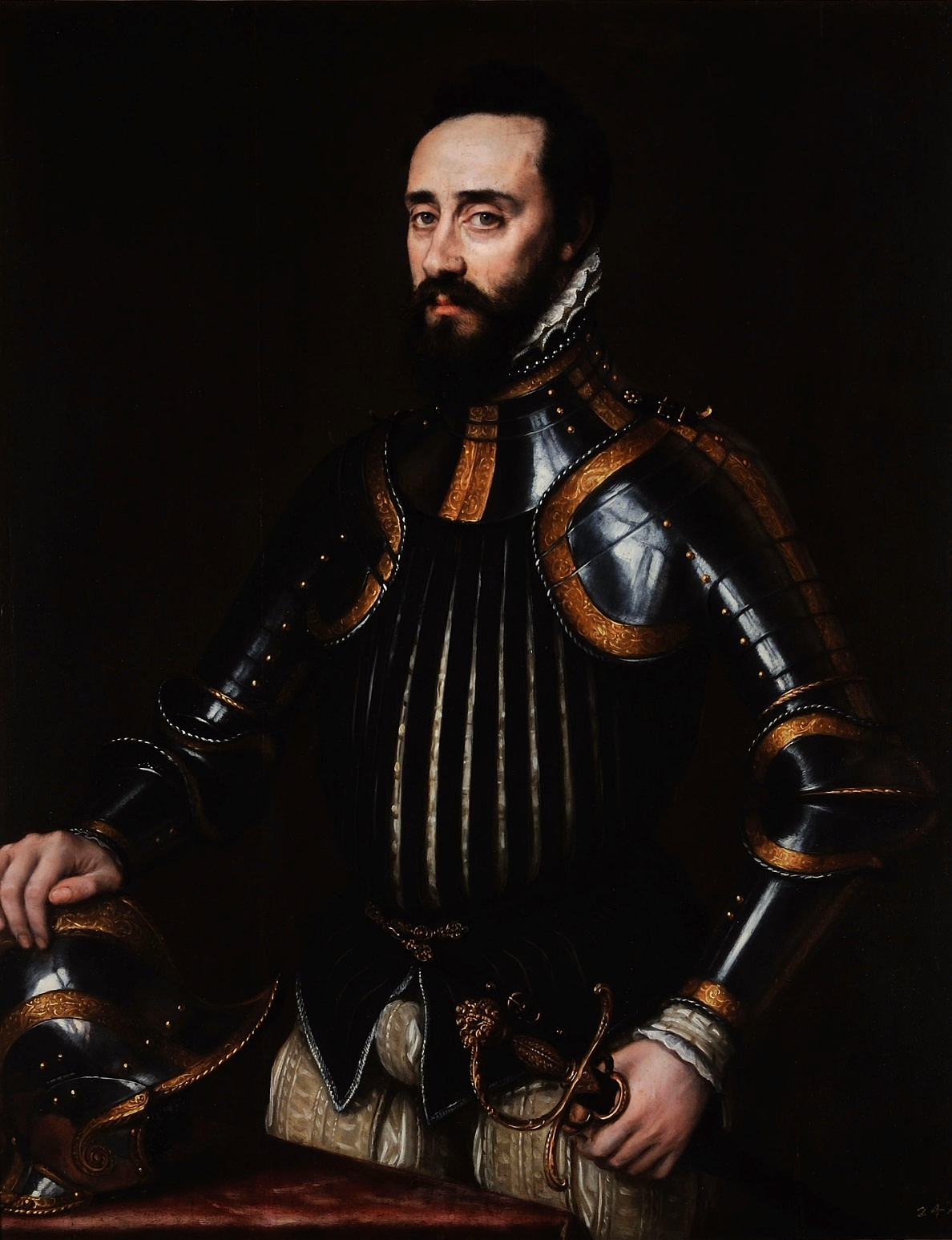
Antonis Mor, Alfonso d'Avalos (c. 1530)

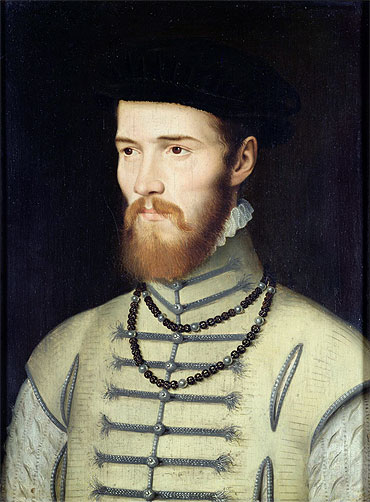
François Clouet, So-called "Don Juan" (c. 1550)

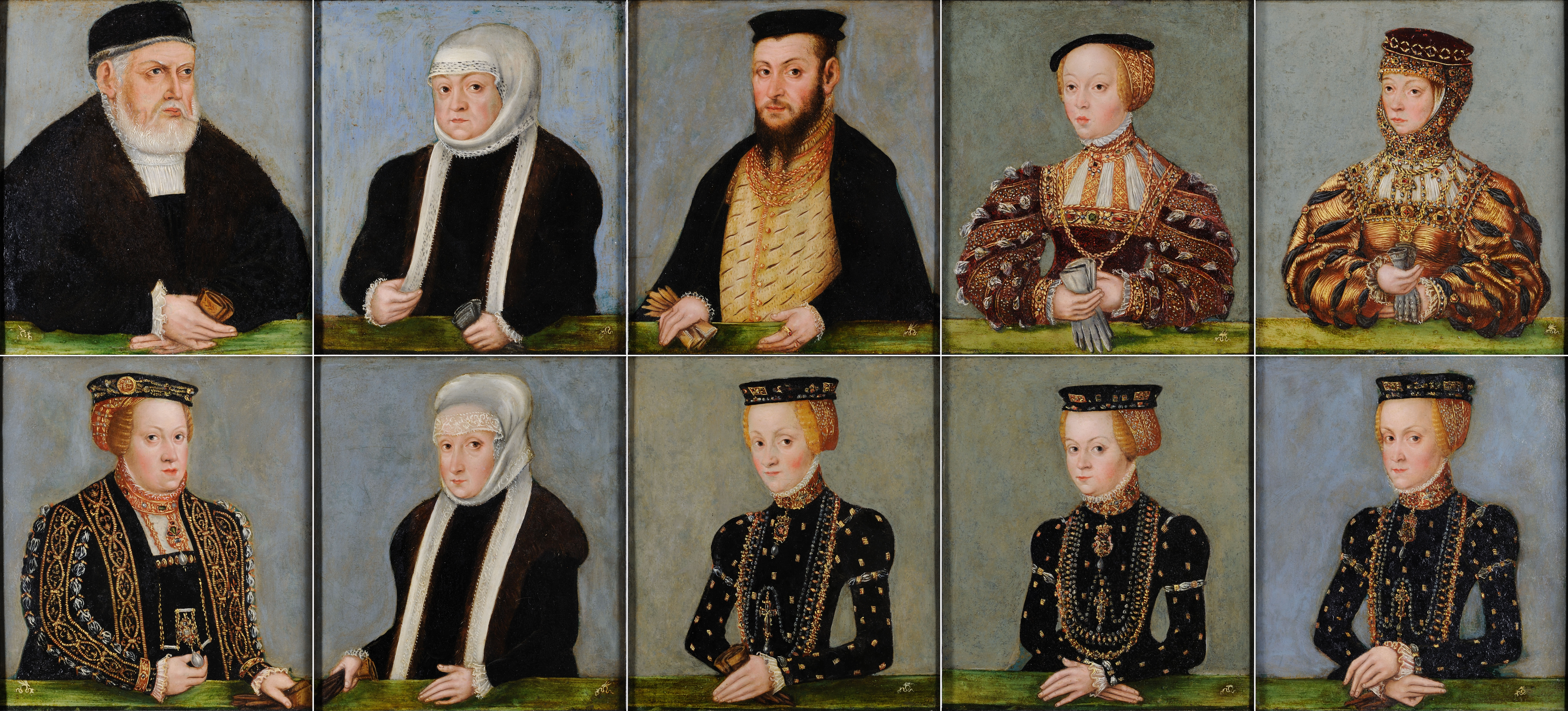
Lucas Cranach the Younger, The Family of Sigismund I of Poland (1553-1555)

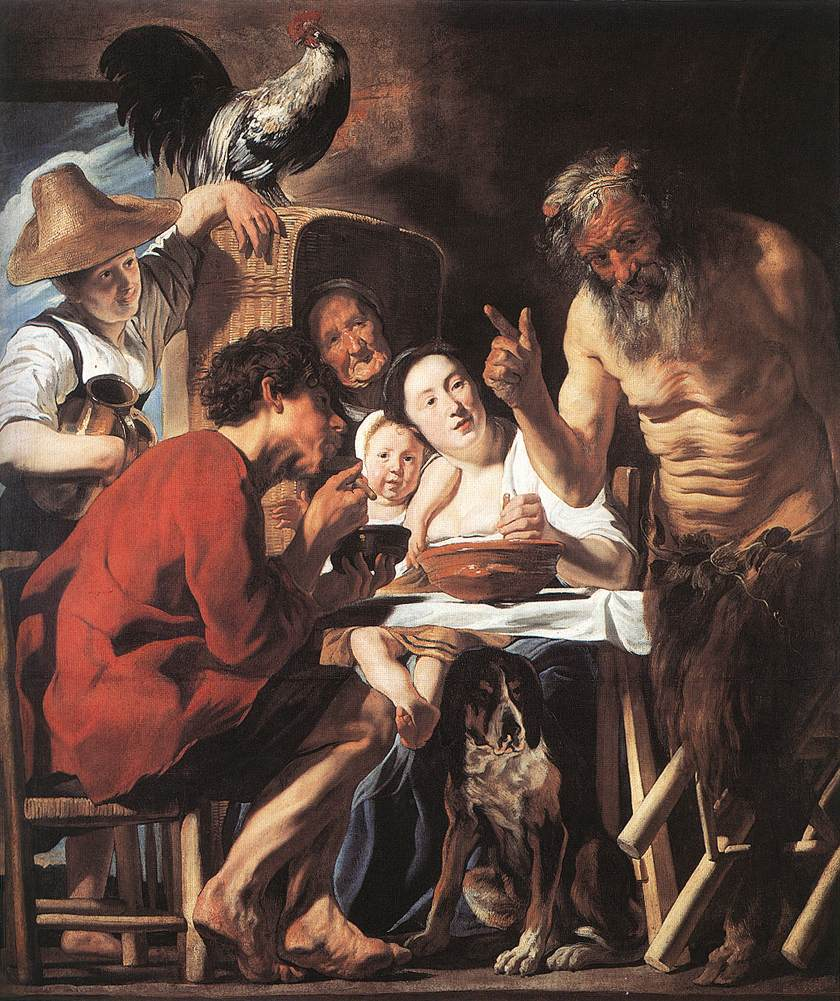
Jacob Jordaens, A Satyr Visiting a Peasant (c. 1620)

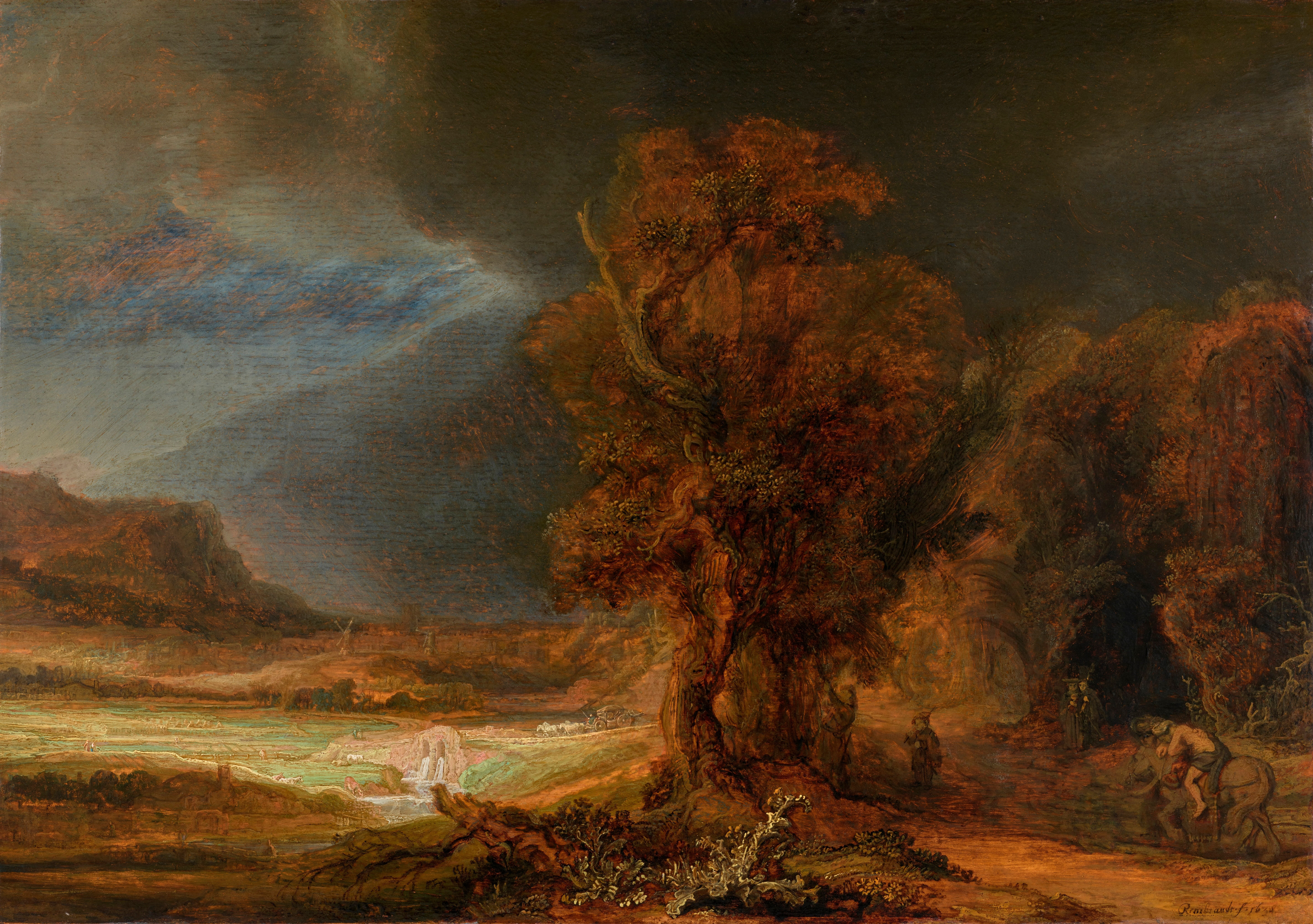
Rembrandt, Landscape with the Good Samaritan (1637)

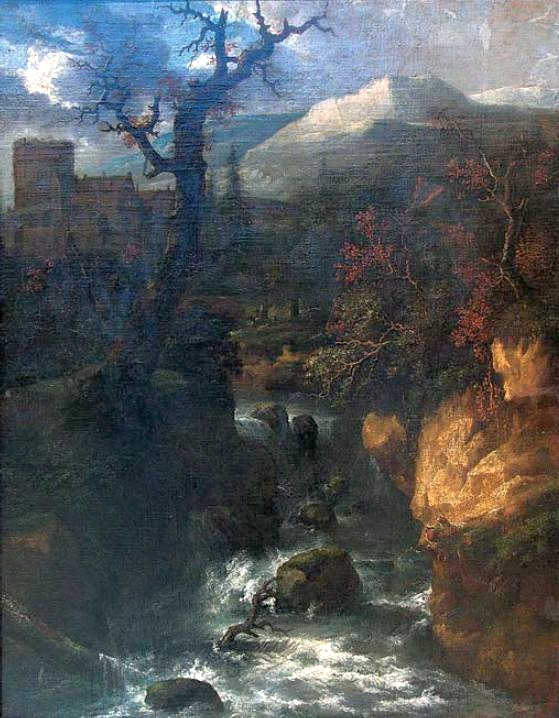
Jan van Kessel, Landscape with a Waterfall and a Castle (c. 1663–1664)

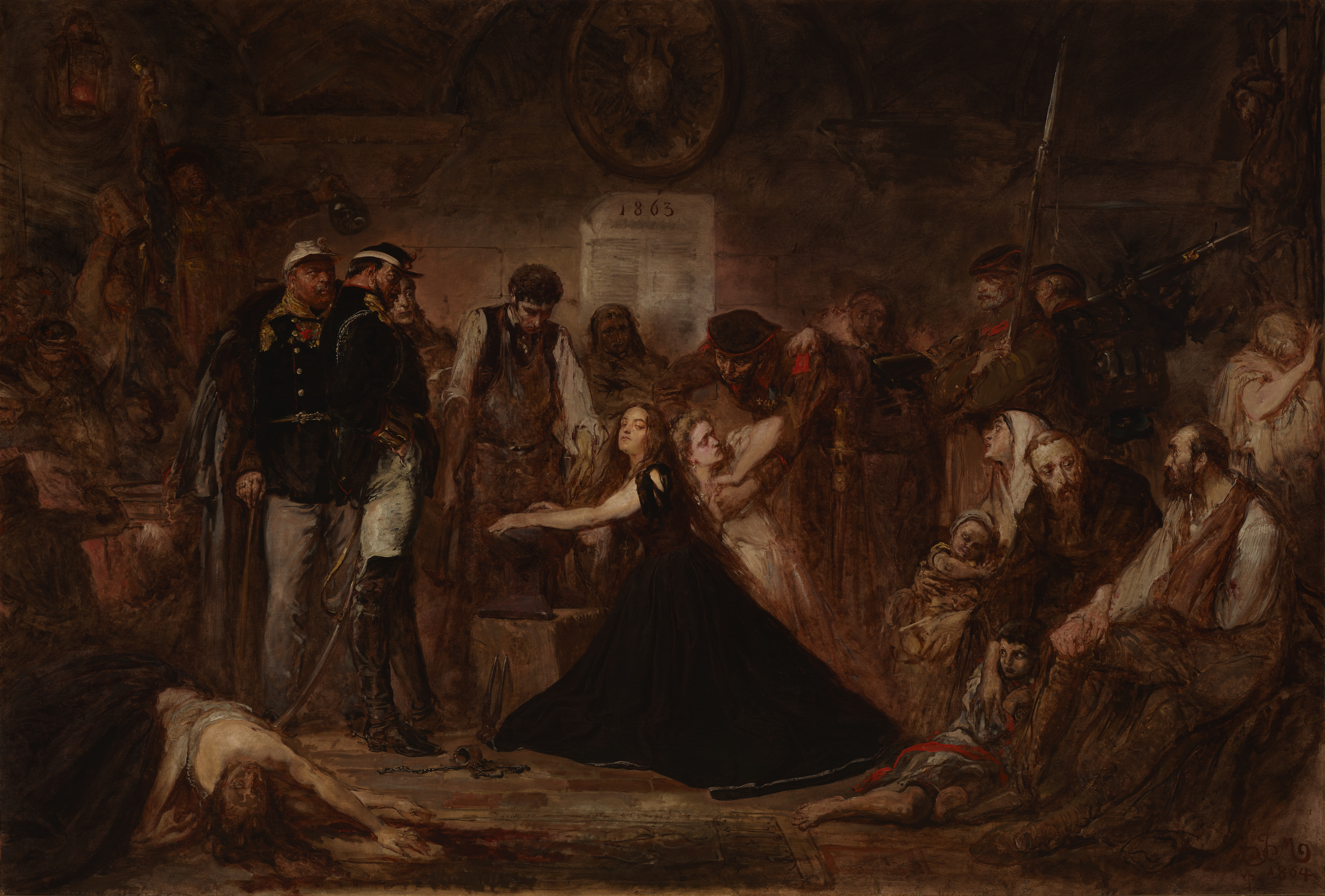
Jan Matejko, Poland - The Year 1863 (1864)

== Move to Kraków ==
In 1871, after the French defeat in the Franco-Prussian War, Prince Władysław packed or hid all of the artifacts and fled. In 1874, the city of Kraków offered him the arsenal in the Old Wall as a museum, which he called upon Viollet-le-Duc to renovate, who in turn delegated the project to his son-in-law Maurice Ouradou. In 1878, one hundred years after Princess Izabela set up her museum in Puławy, the new museum, as it is seen today, was opened. Prince Wladyslaw continued to add items to the collection for the next twenty years, until his death in 1894.

Władysław's son, Prince Adam Ludwik, then carried on the work of his father. In 1897 he took over the Sieniawa Ordynacja property from the Emperor Franz-Joseph. At that point his capital assets were estimated at 4.5 million Austrian Crowns, not including the Collections. In 1899, Adam Ludwik's aunt Izabela bequeathed the Gołuchów Estate, with all the collections that she had bought with her beloved brother Władysław, to her two nephews, and Prince Adam Ludwik cared for both Museums.

== Dresden and back ==
He then travelled to Japan and acquired the vases and bronzes still displayed today at the Goluchow Castle. In 1914, he was called up to the Austrian Army and his wife Princess Maria Ludwika Krasinska took over the Museum, taking most of the important artifacts (52 paintings, 12 carpets, 35 folders of prints and drawings, and works by Leonardo da Vinci, Raphael, and Rembrandt) to Dresden because of her connections with the Royal Saxon Family. These works garnered great interest, with the collection being open to the public two days a week.

In 1918, after the war, Hans Posse, Director of the royal collections, was unwilling to return the collection. He was fearful of the unrest in Poland. However, after two years of negotiation, all objects were recovered and transferred to the Family Museum in Kraków in 1920. The signing of the 1921 Treaty of Riga provided for the return of all looted or confiscated objects during tsarism due to the Bolshevik revolution.

In 1931 a large number of important books, archives and objects that had been taken from Puławy by Russians in 1831—immediately after the November Uprising—were also returned, though most of these were placed in various national depositories.

In 1937, after Prince Adam Ludwik's death, his son Prince Augustyn, took over as head of the family. He married Princess Dolores Victoria Maria de las Mercedes de Borbon y Orleans and spent most of his time in Poland. Then, in August 1939, Europe was thrown into turmoil with the events of World War II, and the museum was forced to prepare for war. Sixteen cases packed with the most precious objects were transported and stored in Sieniawa, while the rest of the collection was carried down to the cellars of the museum, where the Germans found the cases and looted the tradable objects. Luckily, although the Leonardo and other pictures were roughly handled, they were not damaged.

== Closure ==
On September 22, 1939, Prince Agustyn removed what remained of the treasures and took them to his cousin's property in Pełkinie. However, soon afterward the Gestapo found the cases and took them back to Kraków, though not to the museum. On January 25, 1940, the final selections of the 85 most important items from the Museum were sent to Dresden, where Dr. Posse, Hitler's plenipotentiary, decided that all objects were to be part of the Führer's own collection at Linz. From that moment the museum, whose curator was to die in a Nazi concentration camp, was closed to the public.

In 1945, Dr. Hans Frank, German governor of Poland and personal friend of Hitler, brought the paintings from Berlin for his own use at Wawel Castle. But when the Germans evacuated Kraków in January 1945, he took the paintings with him to Silesia and then to his own villa in Neuhaus. The Americans arrested Dr. Frank on May 4, and the Polish representative at the Allies Commission for the Retrieval of Works of Art claimed the stolen paintings on behalf of the Czartoryski Museum. However, the Raphael and 843 other artifacts were missing from the collection. The whereabouts of these works, remain unknown to this day.

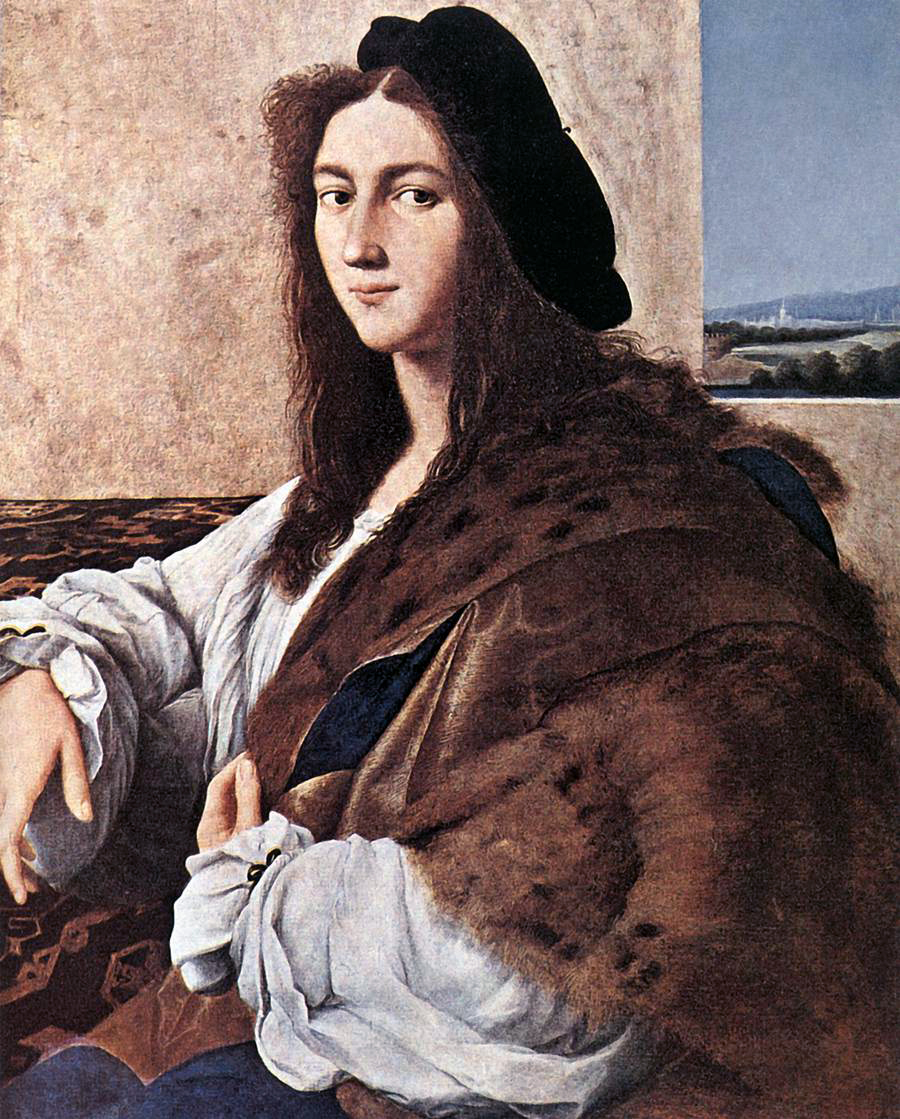
Raphael, Portrait of a Young Man. Stolen by the Nazis, although the Polish Ministry of Foreign Affairs states that it has been known "for years" that the painting survived the war.

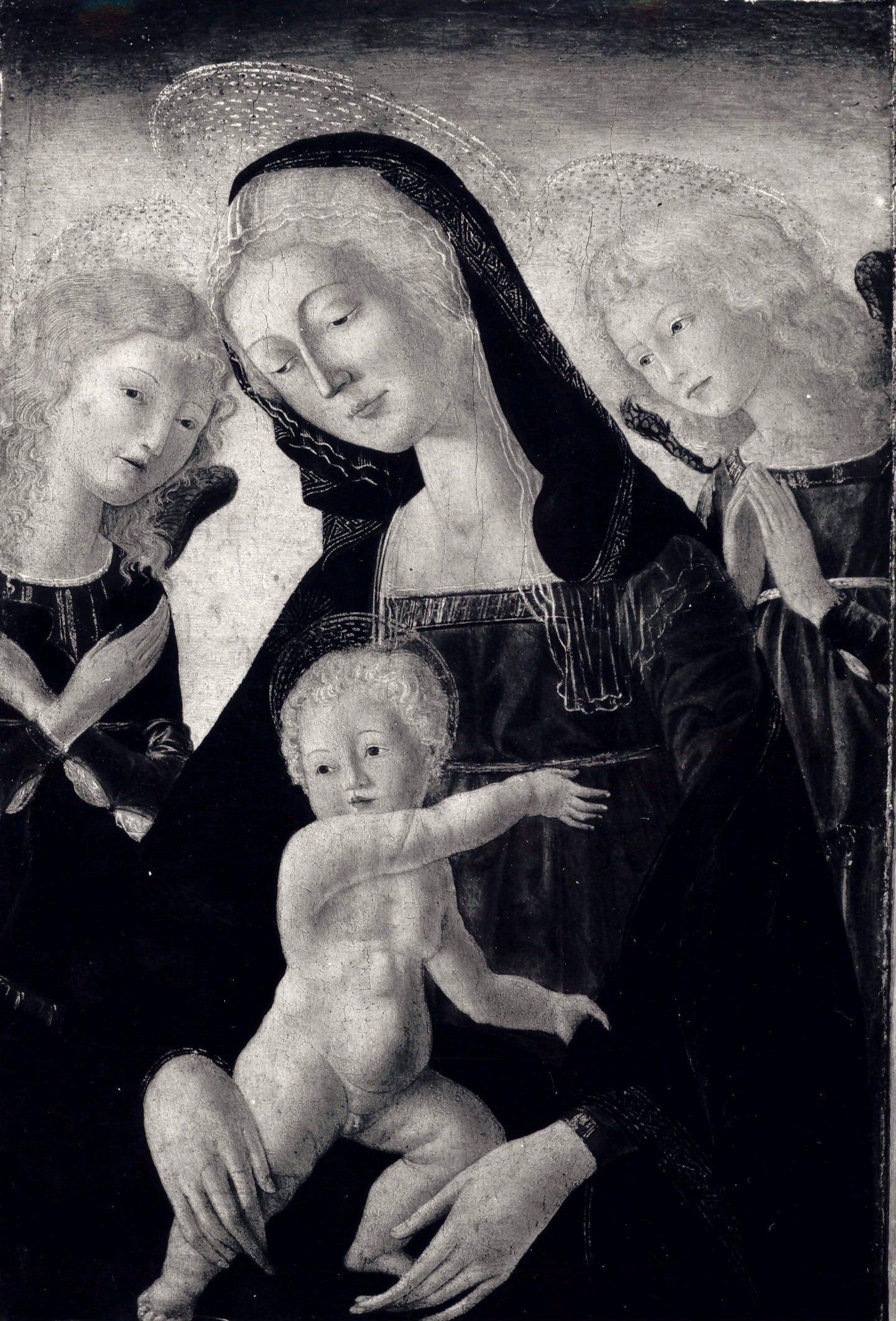
The Mother of God with the Child, 1470s, tempera on panel. Stolen by the Nazis.

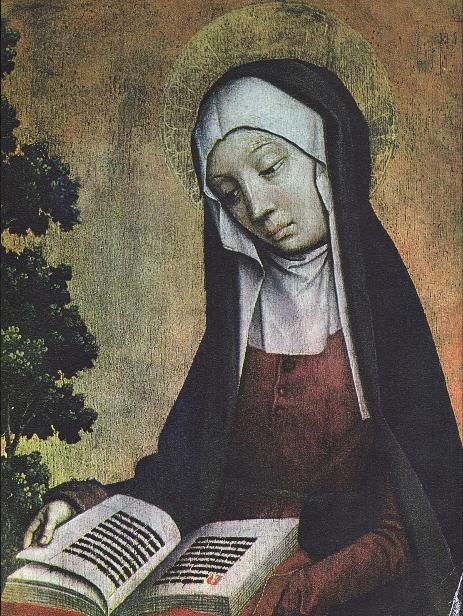
Saint with a Book, 15th century. Stolen for Adolf Hitler's planned Führer Museum in Linz.

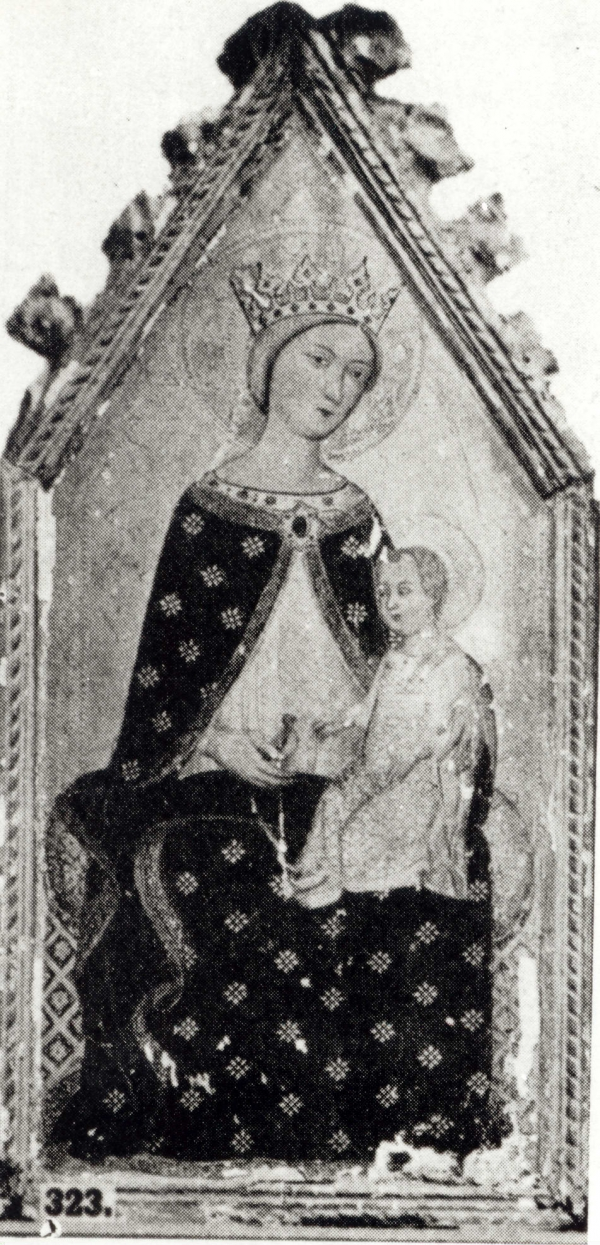
Madonna with Child (triptych), 14th century. Stolen in WWII.

== After World War II ==
After World War II, the Museum was reopened and operated by Poland's communist government. Amid the country's desperate economic situation, the Museum survived thanks largely to the work of Professor Marek Rostworoski, who dedicated his life to the collections. In 1991 the High Court of the Nation returned the Museum to its rightful owner, Prince Adam Karol Czartoryski, along with the library housed nearby; from 1961 the library had been located in a building at ulica świętego Marka (St. Mark's Street). In 1971 the Czartoryski Library was recognized as National Library.

The Library's collections include many extremely important European historical documents: a total of 224,576, including 70,009 books published before 1800, 13,552 manuscripts, and 333 incunabula. The Library comprises a "Prints and Cartography Division" and a "Manuscripts and Archives Division". The President of the Institution is Jolanta Lenkiewicz. The Library's books may be consulted only on the premises.

The Museum was administered from 1991 through 2016 by the Princes Czartoryski Foundation, set up for that purpose in 1991 by Prince Adam Karol Czartoryski. It welcomed more than 12,000 visitors a year and has organized exhibitions in the United States (Washington, D.C.), Italy (Rome, Milan, Florence), the United States (Milwaukee, Huston, San Francisco), Sweden (Malmö, Stockholm), Turkey (Istanbul), Japan (Kyoto, Nagoya, Yokohama), Spain (Royal Palace, Madrid), and the United Kingdom (National Gallery, London). In autumn 2002, the Lady with an Ermine was featured at the Milwaukee Art Museum's tribute to the Splendor of Poland; in 2003 the portrait and other collection items went on to Houston and San Francisco.

In 2010 the Museum closed for repairs and modernization. Parts of the collection were temporarily displayed in other venues. 350 selected items were shown in the Arsenal building, while the Lady with an Ermine was displayed in the Kraków National Museum.

In 2016 the collections and Museum building were donated by Prince Adam Karol Czartoryski to the Polish Nation on his behalf and that of his direct ancestors of the Czartoryski Main Branch State Treasury. The Princes Czartoryski Foundation received from the Polish Nation (the Ministry of Culture) $105 million, constituting less than 5% of the 3 billion euros estimated market value of the collections. The agreement also transferred to the Polish State the rights to any future claims to works of art that had been plundered from the collections.

The restored museum reopened on December 19, 2019. The restoration was awarded the SARP Award of the Year conferred by the Association of Polish Architects in 2020.

The donation of the Czartoryski Museum to the Polish Nation has been challenged by Prince Adam Karol's daughter Tamara, leading in 2018 to intrafamilial litigation between Adam Karol and his daughter.

== The Czartoryski Museum Building Complex ==
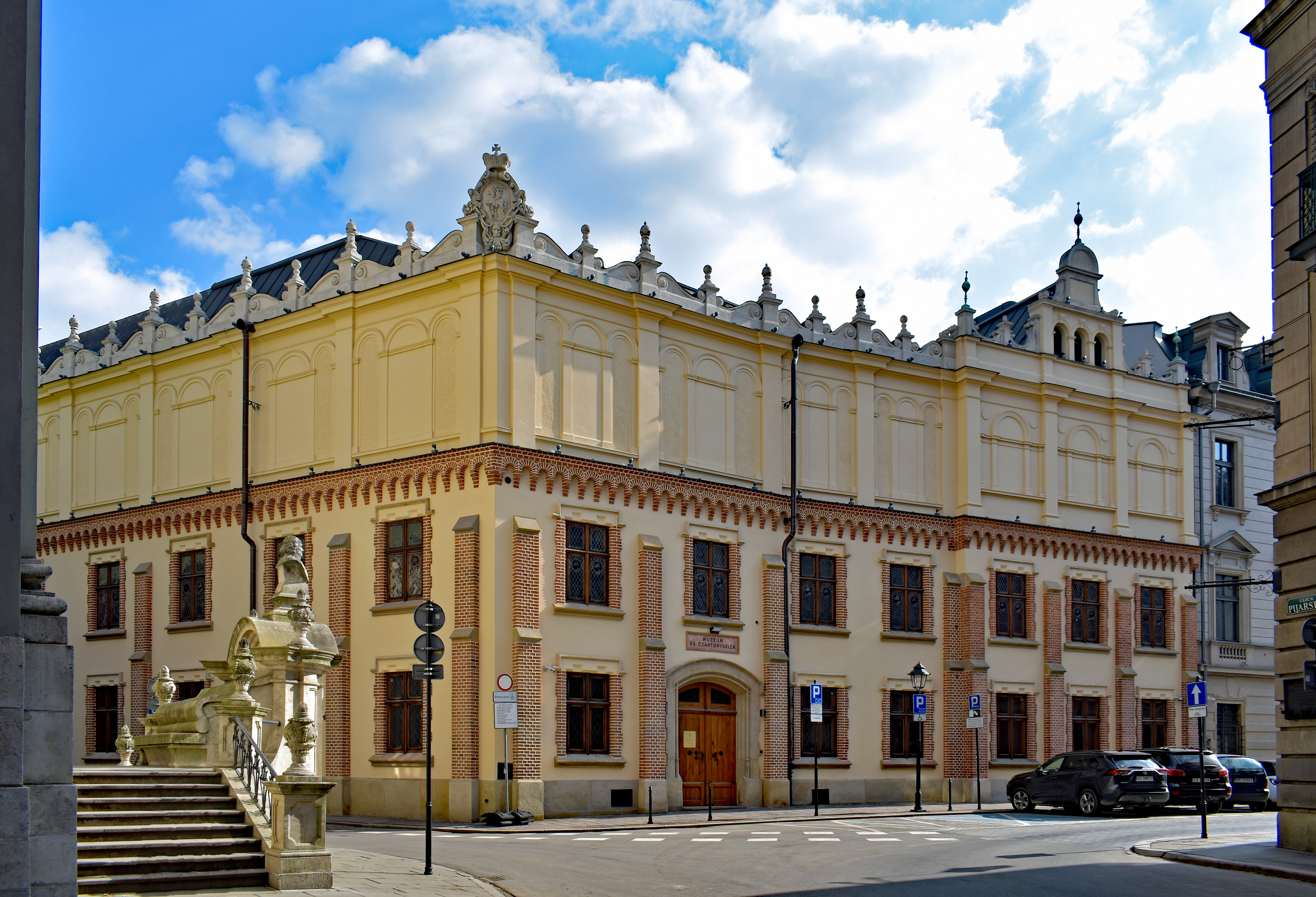
Czartoryski Palace
17-19 św. Jana Street
(15 Pijarska Street)

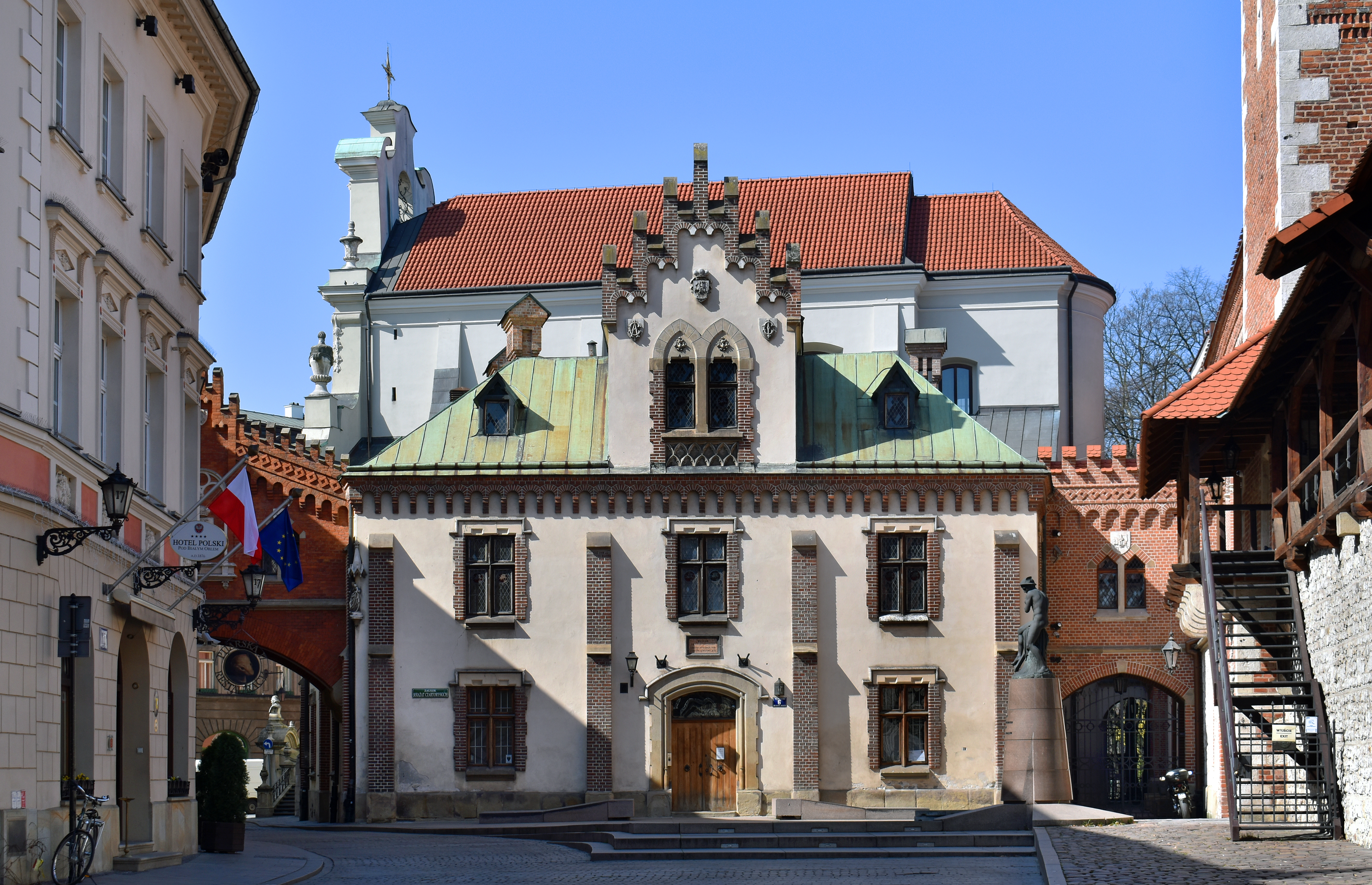
Klasztorek (Small Monastery)
6 Pijarska Street

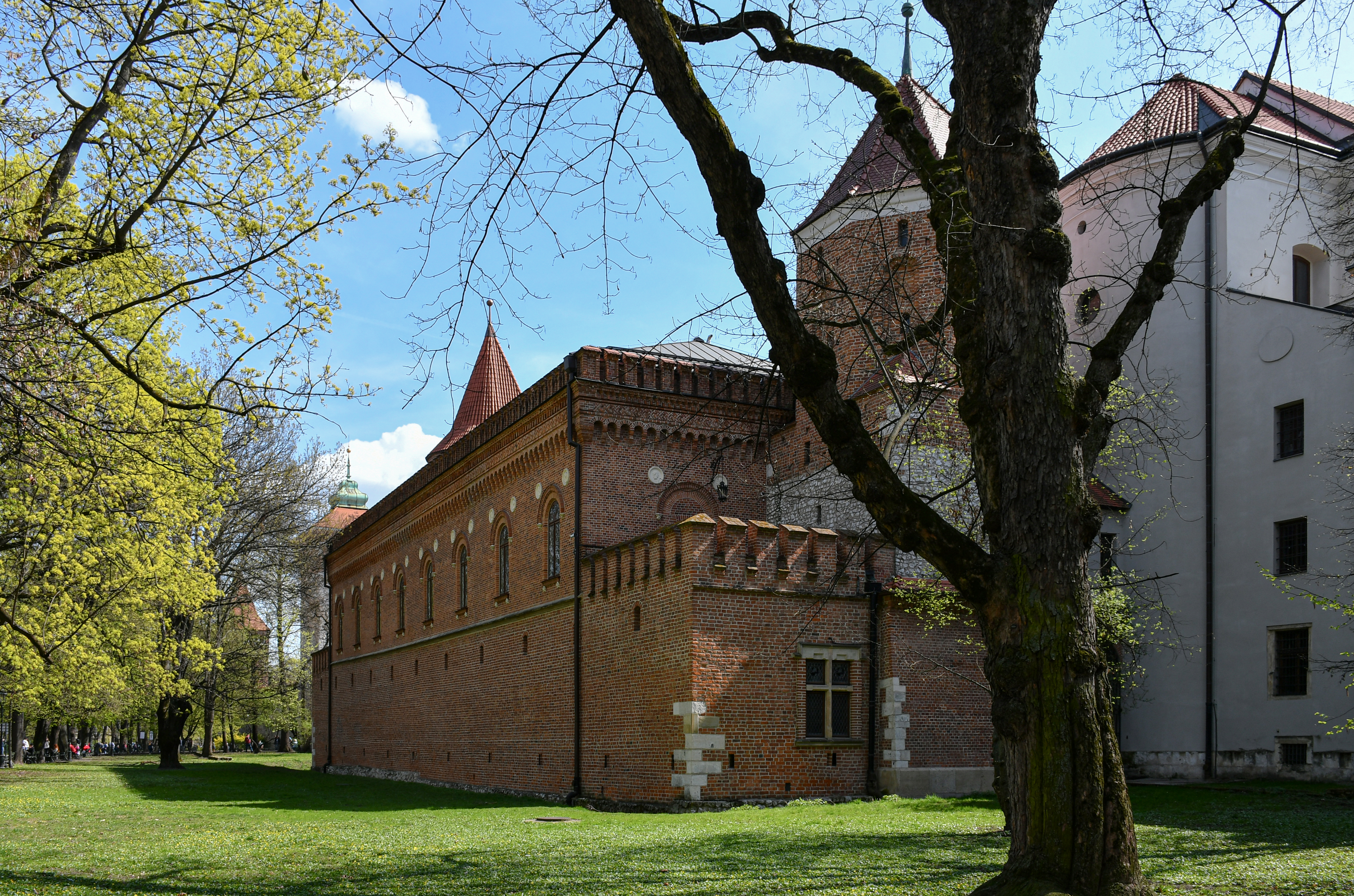
Former Municipal Arsenal
8 Pijarska Street

== See also ==
- Czartoryski Library
- Culture of Kraków
- National Museum, Kraków
- EUROPEUM – European Culture Centre
- Mold of the Earth
- Royal Casket
- Poland - The Year 1863
