= Donato Veneziano =

Italian painter

Donato Veneziano, also known as Donato Bragadin, was an Italian painter of the Renaissance period. He was an artist living at Venice between 1438 and 1460, was probably a pupil of Jacobello del Fiore. His only known extant work in situ is a depiction of a winged lion flanked by saints Jerome and Augustine, presently held in the Sala Grimani of the Doge's Palace in Venice.
