= Omon =

Omon or OMON may refer to:

- OMON (Отряд милиции особого назначения, Otryad Militsii Osobogo Naznacheniya, Special Purpose Police Unit), Soviet and post-Soviet special police
- OMON (Belarus), the Belarusian form of the Russian OMON, also referred to as AMAP
- Xavier Omon (b. 1985), an American football running back for the Denver Broncos
- Omon, a fictional character in the 1992 Russian novel Omon Ra by Victor Pelevin
- Ọmọn, female name prefix in the Esan language

== See also ==
- Oman (disambiguation)
- Omen (disambiguation)
- Omin
