= Oman (disambiguation) =

Oman is a country in West Asia.

Oman may also refer to:

== Places ==
- Muscat and Oman, predecessor sultanate (1856–1970)
- Oman proper, historical region of, and previous imamate within, modern Oman
- Trucial Oman or Trucial States, predecessor to the United Arab Emirates and adjacent to Oman

== People ==
- Carola Oman (1897–1978), English historian and author
- Charles Oman (1860–1946), British military historian
- Charles P. Oman (born 1948), American economist
- Ed Oman (1930–2013), Canadian politician
- Joseph Wallace Oman (1864–1941), American rear admiral
- Julia Trevelyan Oman (1930–2003), British set designer, granddaughter of Charles Oman
- Ken Oman (born 1982), Irish footballer
- Nathan Oman (born 1975), American legal scholar and educator
- Paul W. Oman (1908–1996), American entomologist
- Ralph Oman (born 1940), American military officer

== Other ==
- Oman (fish), a genus of fish in the family Blenniidae
- Oman bullhead shark, shark
- Oman LNG, liquefied natural gas plant in Oman
- Oman moray, a species of Moray eel

== See also ==
- Omen (disambiguation)
- Omin
- Omon (disambiguation)
- Uman (disambiguation)
