= Kalwa =

Kalwa may refer to:

- Kalwa, Thane, India
  - Kalwa railway station, Thane
- Kalwa, Rajasthan, India
- Kalwa, Pomeranian Voivodeship (north Poland)
- Kalwa, Warmian-Masurian Voivodeship (north Poland)
