= Lacko =

Lacko may refer to:

- Lukáš Lacko (born 1987), Slovak former tennis player
- Martin Lacko (born 1976), Slovak historian
- Łącko (disambiguation), several places in Poland
- Läckö, Vänern island in Lidköping Municipality, Sweden
