= Korsztyn =

- Settlement
- Location within Poland
- Coordinates: 53°31′58″N 20°04′19″E
- Country: Poland
- Voivodeship: Warmian-Masurian
- County: Ostróda
- Gmina: Grunwald
- Time zone: UTC+1 (CET)
  - Summer (DST): UTC+2 (CEST)
- Vehicle registration: NOS

Korsztyn [ˈkɔrʂtɨn] is a settlement in the administrative district of Gmina Grunwald, within Ostróda County, Warmian-Masurian Voivodeship, in northern Poland. It is located in Masuria.

The village was founded by Poles.
