= Mold of the Earth =

Story written by Bolesław Prus

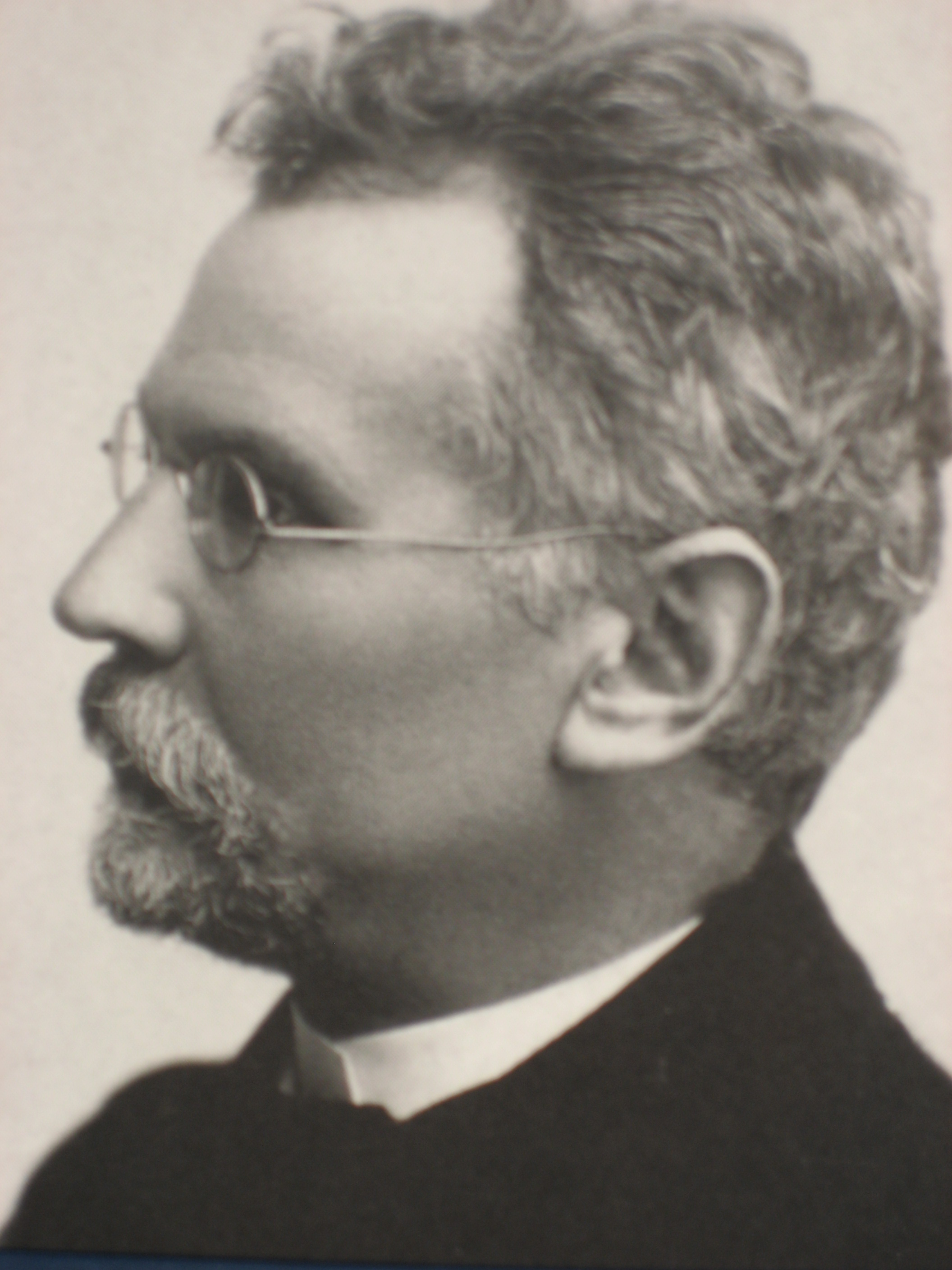
Bolesław Prus

"Mold of the Earth" (Polish: "Pleśń świata") is one of the shortest micro-stories by the Polish writer Bolesław Prus.

The story was published on 1 January 1884 in the New Year's Day issue of the Warsaw Courier (Kurier Warszawski). The story comes from a period of pessimism in the author's life caused by Poland's political situation (nine decades earlier, upon the completion of the Partitions of the Polish–Lithuanian Commonwealth, Poland had ceased to exist as an independent country) and by the 1883 failure of Nowiny (News), a Warsaw daily that Prus had been editing for less than a year.

The story was translated to English, but initially mistranslated with the word pleśń (mold) as pieśń (song), yielding the title "Song of the World".

== Theme ==
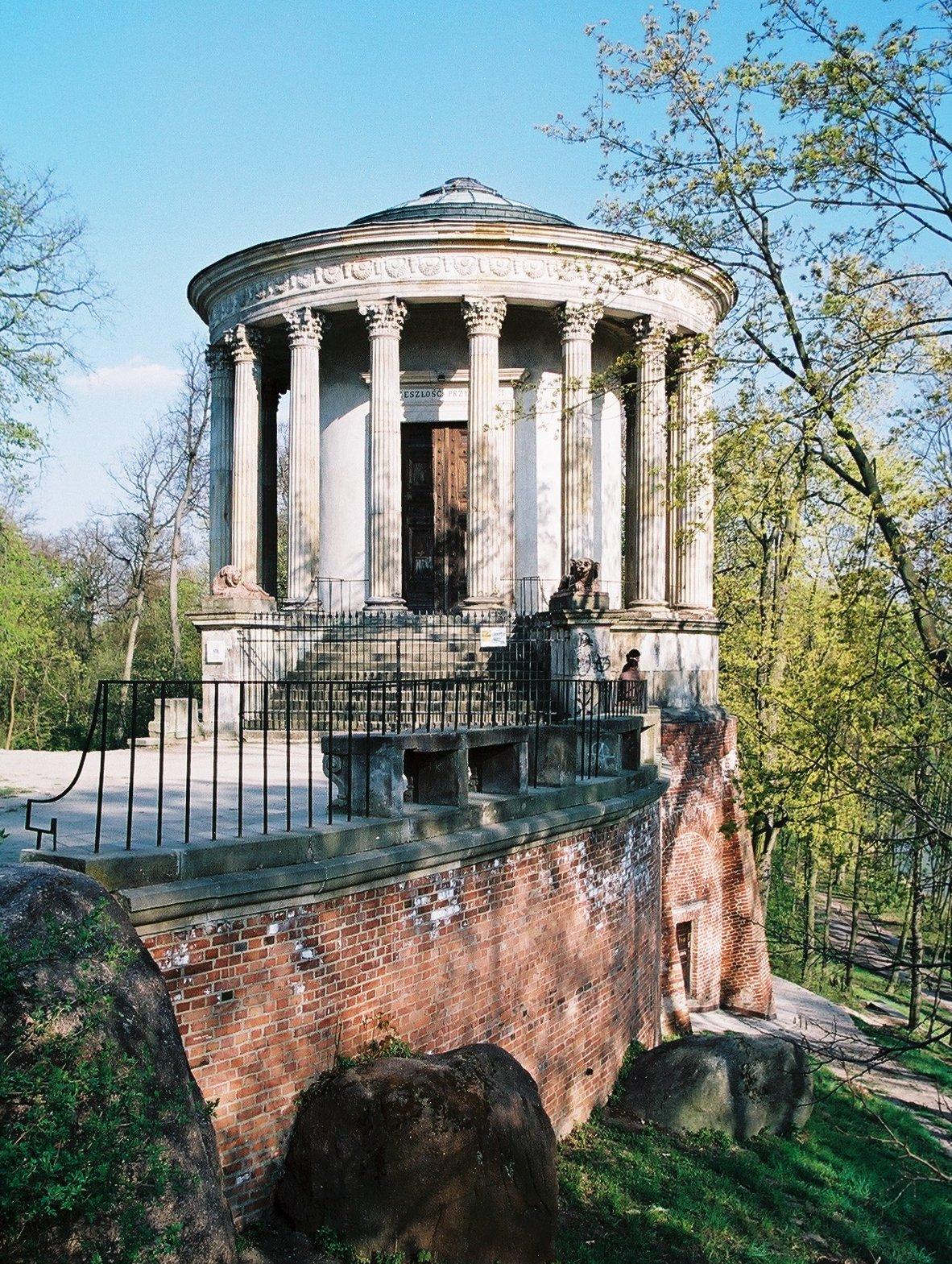
Temple of the Sibyl at Puławy

The story is set adjacent to the Temple of the Sibyl on the grounds of the old Czartoryski estate in Puławy. The Temple had been erected in the late 18th century by Princess Izabela Czartoryska as a museum and patriotic memorial to the late Polish–Lithuanian Commonwealth. Next to the Temple is a boulder, overgrown with molds, which at a certain moment magically transforms into a globe.

In his one-and-a-half-page micro-story, Prus identifies human societies with colonies of molds that contest the surface of the globe. He thus provides a metaphor for the competitive struggle for existence that goes on among human societies.

This theme resonates with Prus's last major—and only historical—novel, Pharaoh (1895), and still more with his first major novel, The Outpost (1886). The latter depicts the struggle of the stolid Polish peasant Ślimak ("Snail") to hang onto his farmstead against the encroachments of German settlers who are buying up adjacent land, encouraged by their government's policy of expansion into ethnically Polish lands.

Prus's metaphor of society-as-organism, which he uses implicitly in "Mold of the Earth" and explicitly in the introduction to his novel Pharaoh, was borrowed from the sociological writings of Herbert Spencer, who had invented the expression "survival of the fittest" and exerted the greatest influence on Prus's thinking.

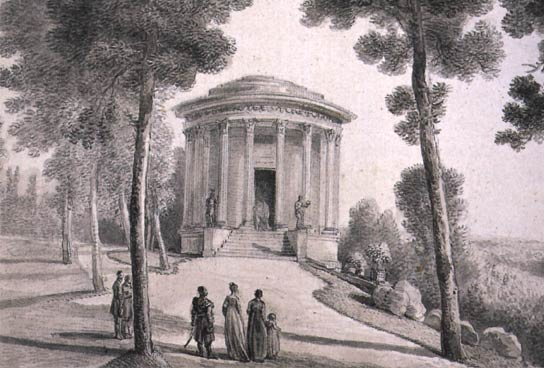
Temple of the Sibyl: 19th-century engraving

The story's setting carries a patriotic subtext, since Izabela and Adam Kazimierz Czartoryski had in the 18th century turned their estate into a leading private center of Polish history and culture. They had particularly dedicated the Temple of the Sibyl as a museum and memorial to the Polish–Lithuanian Commonwealth which had been, in their lifetime, partitioned out of political existence by the neighboring Russian, Prussian and Austrian empires.

== Inspirations ==
In 1869, 22-year-old Bolesław Prus had briefly studied at the Agricultural and Forestry Institute that had been established on the old Czartoryski estate. Before that, he had spent several years of his early childhood in Puławy.

"Mold of the Earth" is one of several micro-stories by Bolesław Prus that were partly inspired by 19th-century French prose poetry.

== See also ==
- Czartoryski Museum
- Historical recurrence
- Izabela Czartoryska
- "A Legend of Old Egypt" (Prus's first historical short story)
- "The Living Telegraph" (a micro-story by Bolesław Prus)
- Pharaoh (historical novel by Bolesław Prus)
- Prose poetry
- Royal Casket
- "Shades" (a micro-story by Bolesław Prus)
- Sociophysics
- Temple of the Sibyl

== Sources ==
- Christopher Kasparek, "Two Micro-Stories by Bolesław Prus," The Polish Review, 1995, no. 1, pp. 99–103.
- Zygmunt Szweykowski, Twórczość Bolesława Prusa (The Writings of Bolesław Prus), 2nd ed., Warsaw, Państwowy Instytut Wydawniczy, 1972.
- Tokarzówna, Krystyna; Stanisław Fita (1969). Szweykowski, Zygmunt (ed.). Bolesław Prus, 1847-1912: Kalendarz życia i twórczości (Bolesław Prus, 1847-1912: a Calendar of His Life and Work). Warsaw: Państwowy Instytut Wydawniczy.
