= Grunwald Swords =

- Grunwald swords as shown in the coat of arms of the present-day commune of Grunwald
- Type: Battle swords
- Place of origin: Prussia

Service history
- In service: Gift of the Teutonic Order to Poland and Lithuania, after 1410 Polish ceremonial swords
- Used by: Teutonic Order, after 1410 by Poland

Production history
- Produced: before 1410

The Grunwald Swords (Polish: miecze grunwaldzkie, Lithuanian: Žalgirio kalavijai) are a pair of simple bare swords sent as a mocking "gift" by Ulrich von Jungingen, the Grand Master of the Order of Teutonic Knights, to King Władysław II Jagiełło of Poland and Grand Duke Vytautas of Lithuania. The swords were sent on 15 July 1410, just before the Battle of Grunwald (Tannenberg), as a symbolic invitation to engage Jungingen's forces in battle. After the Polish–Lithuanian victory, both swords were taken as a war trophy by King Władysław II to Kraków, Poland's capital at the time, and placed in the treasury of the Royal Wawel Castle.

With time, the two swords became treated as royal insignia, symbolising the monarch's reign over two nations: the Kingdom of Poland and the Grand Duchy of Lithuania. They were probably used in coronations of most Polish kings from the 16th to the 18th centuries. In private hands after the partitions of the Polish–Lithuanian Commonwealth at the end of the 18th century, they were lost without a trace in 1853. They have remained, however, a symbol of victory and Poland's and Lithuania's past, and an important part of national identity of the two nations.

== Battle of Grunwald ==
Modern renditions of the arms borne by the grand master's heralds

The battle of Grunwald was part of the Great War fought during 1409–1411 between a Polish–Lithuanian coalition led by King Władysław II and Grand Duke Vytautas (Alexander) on one side and the Teutonic Order aided by West European knights and led by Grand Master Ulrich von Jungingen on the other side. It was the decisive battle of the war and one of the largest in medieval Europe.

As both sides were preparing for the battle in the morning of 15 July 1410, two heralds carrying two unsheathed swords were announced to King Władysław II. According to Jan Długosz's chronicle, they bore the coats of arms of their respective masters: a black eagle in a golden field of King Sigismund of the Romans, and a red griffin in a silver field of Duke Casimir V of Pomerania. The heralds had been sent by the grand master to Władysław II and Vytautas, but since the latter was busy making his troops ready for the battle, it was only the king, accompanied by his closest aides, who received the envoys. The heralds spoke in German while the royal secretary, Jan Mężyk of Dąbrowa, served as an interpreter. They delivered, according to Długosz, the following message:

Your Majesty! The Grand Master Ulryk sends you and your brother (...) through us, the deputies standing here, two swords for help so that you, with him and his army, may delay less and may fight more boldly than you have shown, and also that you will not continue hiding and staying in the forest and groves, and will not postpone the battle. And if you believe that you have too little space to form your ranks, the Prussian master Ulryk, to entice you to battle, will withdraw from the plain which he took for his army, as far as you want, or you may instead choose any field of battle so that you do not postpone the battle any longer.

— Grand Master Ulrich von Jungingen's envoys, according to Jan Długosz, Annales...

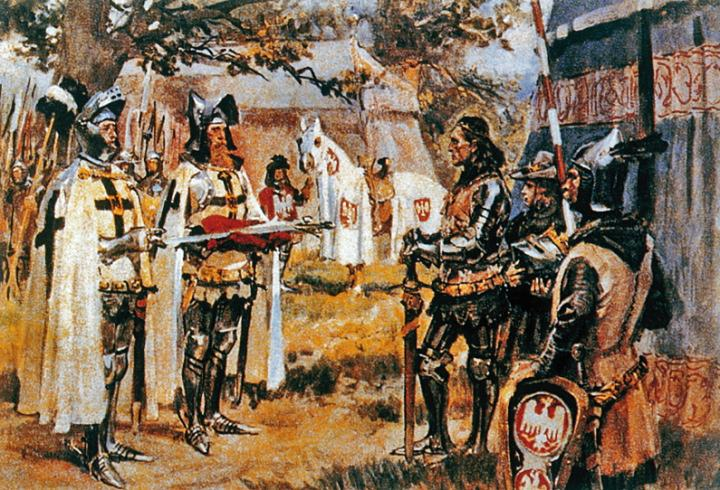
Two Swords by Wojciech Kossak (c. 1909). In this painting, the swords are being presented by members of the Teutonic Order, wearing their distinctive white cloaks, rather than by messengers bearing the heraldic devices described by Długosz.

As they spoke, Teutonic forces did, in fact, withdraw from previously occupied positions. The king accepted the swords and, according to the letter he later wrote to his wife, responded with the following words:

We accept the swords you send us, and in the name of Christ, before whom all stiff-necked pride must bow, we shall do battle.

— King Władysław II, Letter to Queen Anna of Celje

While sending swords as a formal gesture challenging the enemy to battle was customary at that time, adding insults was not. Hence the envoys' speech was considered grossly boastful and impudent, as can be seen from a letter sent by Jan Hus to King Władysław II where the Bohemian religious reformer praised the Polish–Lithuanian victory at Grunwald as a triumph of humility over pride.

Where, then, are the two swords of the enemies? They were indeed cut down with those swords with which they tried to terrify the humble! Behold, they sent you two swords, the swords of violence and of pride, and have lost many thousands of them, having been utterly defeated.

— Jan Hus, Letter to King Władysław II, 1411

== From war trophy to royal insignia ==
The king sent the two swords to Kraków and deposited them, together with Teutonic army banners and other war trophies, in the treasure vault of the Royal Wawel Castle. Eventually, the "two Prussian swords", as they were described in a treasury inventory in 1633, became treated as part of Polish-Lithuanian crown jewels. They were used in royal coronations throughout the existence of the Polish–Lithuanian Commonwealth (1569–1795) and possibly also earlier, during the dynastic union of the two nations under the House of Jagiellon. Since the pair of swords had been given to two rulers – of Poland and Lithuania – each of the weapons was associated with one of the two constituent nations of the Commonwealth.

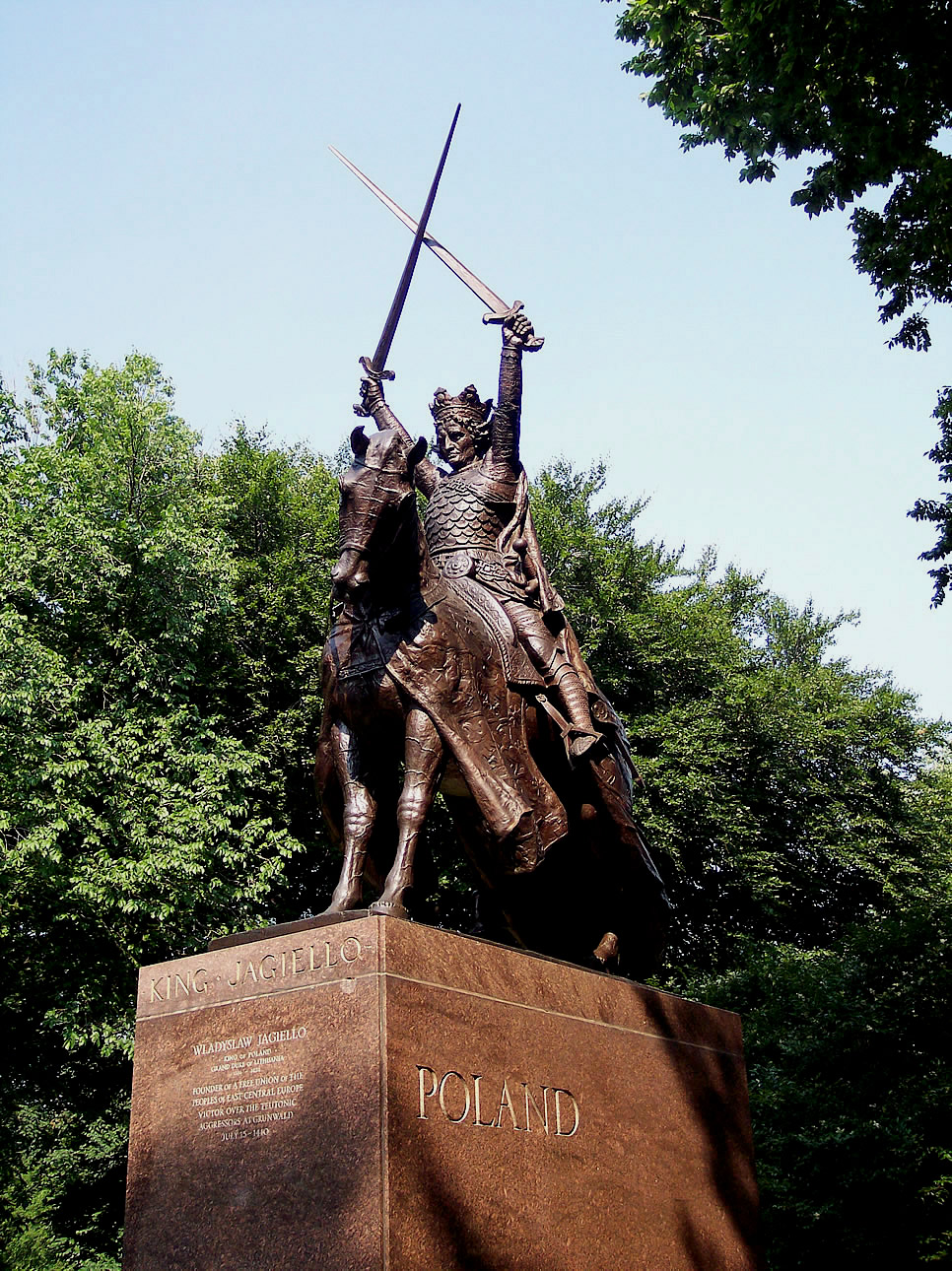
The monument to King Władysław II Jagiełło in Central Park, New York City, United States, depicts him brandishing two swords in victory.

During a coronation ceremony, the king-elect made a sign of the Cross three times with Szczerbiec, or the principal coronation sword. Immediately afterwards, one of the bishops assisting in the ceremony handed the Grunwald Swords to the king who in turn passed them on to the Crown (i.e., Polish) and Lithuanian sword-bearers (miecznicy). After the coronation, the king returned from the cathedral where the ceremony had taken place to the royal castle, preceded, among others, by the two sword-bearers carrying the Grunwald Swords as symbols of the king's reign in the two nations.

Unlike Szczerbiec and other ceremonial swords stored in the royal treasury, the Grunwald Swords were simple battle swords that would have been typical for armament of early 15th-century European knights. At some point in time they were embellished with hilts made from gilded silver. Additionally a little shield with the coat of arms of Poland, the White Eagle, was attached to the blade of one sword and, analogically, a similar shield with the Lithuanian Pursuer was fastened to the other one.

Two of the elective kings of Poland–Lithuania were crowned without the use of the Grunwald Swords. King Stanislaus I Leszczyński was crowned in Warsaw in 1705 with a makeshift set of royal insignia given to him by King Charles XII of Sweden and quickly destroyed after the ceremony. The set probably did not include an equivalent of the Grunwald Swords. During the War of the Polish Succession, Leszczyński's supporters sequestered the Polish Crown Jewels from Wawel and hid them at the Jasna Góra Monastery in Częstochowa to prevent Stanislaus's rival Frederick Augustus Wettin from using them for his coronation. Hence, Augustus III used his own set of crown jewels for his 1734 coronation. His set included two sheathless ceremonial swords, described by an anonymous witness of the ceremony as "two huge épées", that were meant to replace the Grunwald Swords as symbols of Poland and Lithuania. The Polish sword had a pommel in the shape of an eagle's head, a cross-guard in the form of an eagle's talons, and a little crowned heraldic shield with the arms of Poland on the blade. Its Lithuanian counterpart had a pommel shaped like a lion's head, a lion's paws as the cross-guard, and on the blade an armorial shield of Lithuania below a grand-ducal hat. Those two swords were used again in a mourning ceremony on the third anniversary of the death of King Augustus II, Augustus III's father, in 1736. Afterwards, they were moved to the Armory (Rüstkammer) in Dresden where they could still be seen at the end of the 19th century. Their current location is unknown.

== Salvation and loss ==
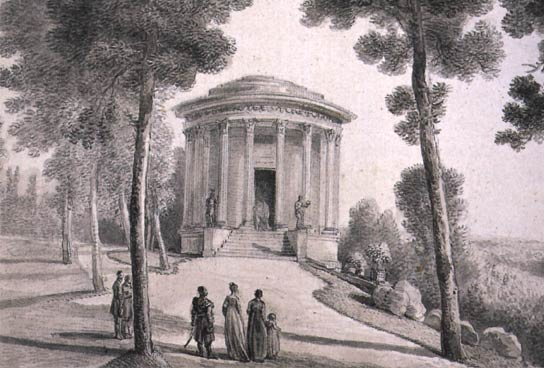
Between 1796 and 1830, the swords were kept in the Temple of the Sibyl at Puławy, the private museum of Princess Izabela Czartoryska (19th-century engraving).

The Grunwald Swords were used for the last time in a coronation of a Polish king – that of Stanislaus Augustus Poniatowski – in 1764 in Warsaw. They are mentioned in the last inventory of the royal treasury of 1792. During the Kościuszko Uprising in 1794, Kraków was captured by the Prussian army, which occupied the Wawel Castle and looted its treasure vault. However, the Prussians, probably uninterested in the material value of two simple iron swords and unaware of their historical and symbolic significance, left the Grunwald Swords behind.

After Prussia ceded Kraków, by the terms of the Third Partition of Poland, to the Habsburg Empire in 1796, the swords were retrieved from the devastated treasury by historian Tadeusz Czacki who handed them over to Princess Izabela Czartoryska. The princess was an art collector known for her interest in Polish national memorabilia. The Grunwald Swords were placed among other patriotic souvenirs in the Temple of the Sibyl, her private museum established in the garden of the Czartoryski Palace in Puławy.

The palace was seized by the Russian government during the November Uprising of 1830–1831. Most of the collection from the Temple of the Sybil had been evacuated to France shortly before the uprising broke out, but the Grunwald Swords were hidden in a parish priest's house in the nearby village of Włostowice (now part of Puławy). In 1853, after the priest's death, the house was searched by Russian gendarmes, or security police, who confiscated the swords as illegal weapons and took them to the fortress of Zamość. Their subsequent fate is unknown.

== Symbolic use ==
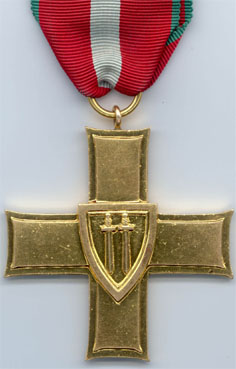
1st class Order of the Cross of Grunwald

Being reminded of Polish military victories over the Teutonic Order used to stir German sensibilities to such an extent, that the inclusion of the Grunwald Swords on a 1938 postage stamp commemorating King Władysław II Jagiełło and Queen Jadwiga resulted in a formal diplomatic protest of Nazi Germany. In the interest of "maintaining good neighborhood", Polish Ministry of Foreign Affairs asked the Polish Post to withdraw the stamp from circulation; on the 1939 version of the stamp, the swords were replaced by a heraldic ornament.

In 1943, Gwardia Ludowa, a communist resistance movement in occupied Poland introduced its own military decoration, the Cross of Grunwald, featuring the Grunwald Swords on its obverse. It was later adopted by the People's Republic of Poland as the second highest military award. The cross ceased to be awarded in 1987 and was formally discontinued in 1992. The swords featured in the Polish Navy Jack in the years 1946–1955.

In modern Poland, the Grunwald Swords remain a popular military symbol, especially in Warmia and Masuria. The commune of Grunwald uses the two swords in its coat of arms.

== See also ==
- Szczerbiec, Poland's principal coronation sword
- Cross of Grunwald, Polish Communist-era military decoration
