= Rychnowska Wola =

- Village
- Location within Poland
- Coordinates: 53°37′N 20°8′E
- Country: Poland
- Voivodeship: Warmian-Masurian
- County: Ostróda
- Gmina: Grunwald
- Population: 150

Rychnowska Wola [rɨxˈnɔfska ˈvɔla] is a village in the administrative district of Gmina Grunwald, within Ostróda County, Warmian-Masurian Voivodeship, in northern Poland.
