= Kitnowo, Warmian-Masurian Voivodeship =

Kitnowo
- Village
- Location within Poland
- Coordinates: 53°32′43″N 20°03′50″E
- Country: Poland
- Voivodeship: Warmian-Masurian
- County: Ostróda
- Gmina: Grunwald
- Population: 210

Kitnowo [kitˈnɔvɔ] is a village in the administrative district of Gmina Grunwald, within Ostróda County, Warmian-Masurian Voivodeship, in northern Poland.
