= Kiersztanowo, Ostróda County =

Kiersztanowo
- Village
- Location within Poland
- Coordinates: 53°33′47″N 20°8′2″E
- Country: Poland
- Voivodeship: Warmian-Masurian
- County: Ostróda
- Gmina: Grunwald

Kiersztanowo [kʲɛrʂtaˈnɔvɔ] is a village in the administrative district of Gmina Grunwald, within Ostróda County, Warmian-Masurian Voivodeship, in northern Poland.
