= Mielno, Warmian-Masurian Voivodeship =

Mielno
- Village
- Location within Poland
- Coordinates: 53°30′43″N 20°11′38″E
- Country: Poland
- Voivodeship: Warmian-Masurian
- County: Ostróda
- Gmina: Grunwald
- Population: 540

Mielno [ˈmjɛlnɔ] is a village in the administrative district of Gmina Grunwald, within Ostróda County, Warmian-Masurian Voivodeship, in northern Poland.
