= Dylewo, Warmian-Masurian Voivodeship =

Dylewo
- Village
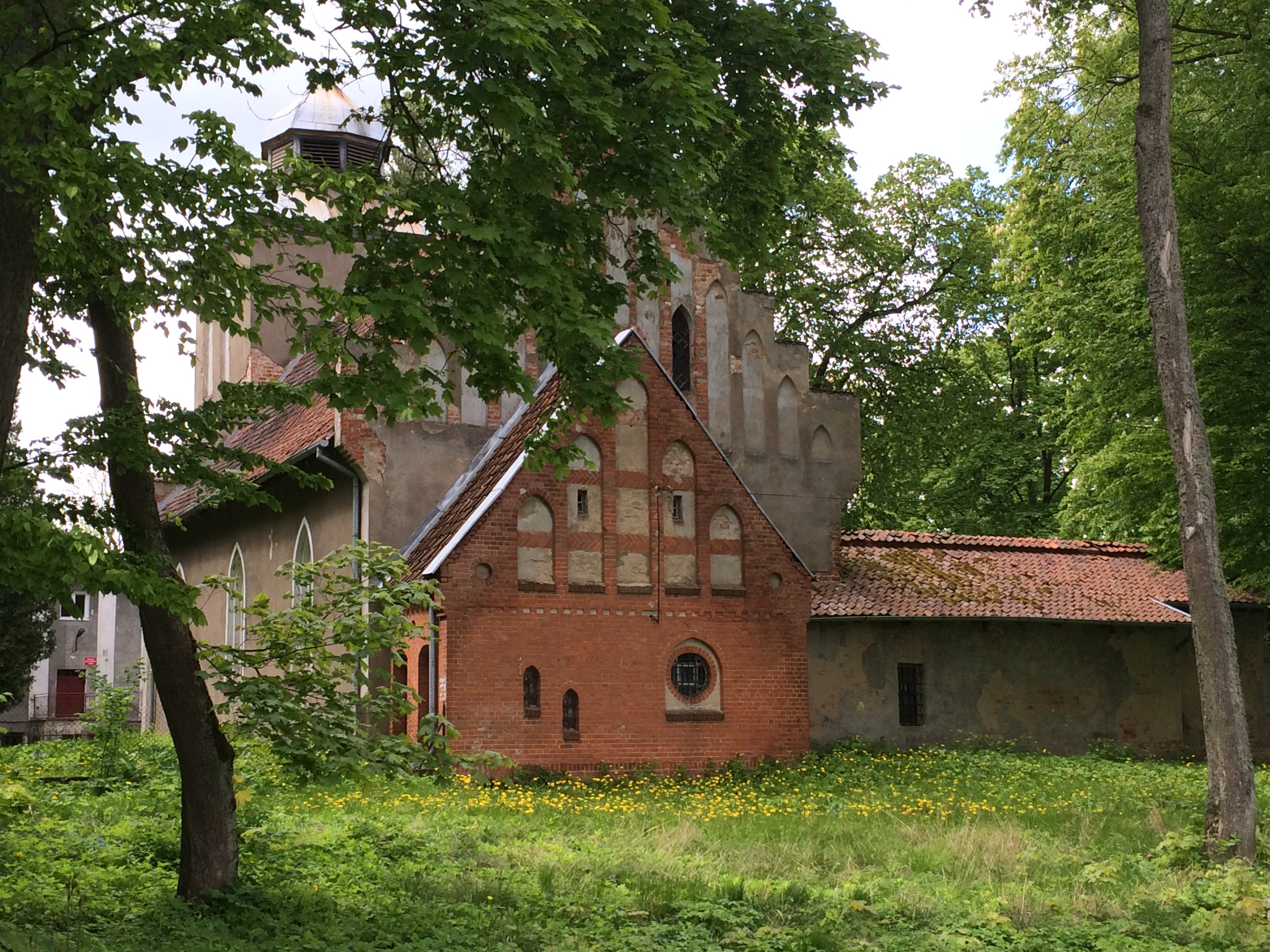
- Our Lady of Consolation church in Dylewo

- Location within Poland
- Coordinates: 53°33′N 20°1′E
- Country: Poland
- Voivodeship: Warmian-Masurian
- County: Ostróda
- Gmina: Grunwald
- Population: 280
- Time zone: UTC+1 (CET)
  - Summer (DST): UTC+2 (CEST)
- Vehicle registration: NOS

Dylewo [dɨˈlɛvɔ] is a village in the administrative district of Gmina Grunwald, within Ostróda County, Warmian-Masurian Voivodeship, in northern Poland.

During World War II, the German Nazi government operated a forced labour subcamp of the Nazi prison in Barczewo in the village.
