= Lipowa Góra, Ostróda County =

Lipowa Góra
- Village
- Location within Poland
- Coordinates: 53°31′15″N 20°09′49″E
- Country: Poland
- Voivodeship: Warmian-Masurian
- County: Ostróda
- Gmina: Grunwald

Lipowa Góra [liˈpɔva ˈɡura] is a village in the administrative district of Gmina Grunwald, within Ostróda County, Warmian-Masurian Voivodeship, in northern Poland.
