= Kiersztanówko =

- Village
- Location within Poland
- Coordinates: 53°34′32″N 20°07′04″E
- Country: Poland
- Voivodeship: Warmian-Masurian
- County: Ostróda
- Gmina: Grunwald
- Population: 200

Kiersztanówko [kʲɛrʂtaˈnufkɔ] is a village in the administrative district of Gmina Grunwald, within Ostróda County, Warmian-Masurian Voivodeship, in northern Poland.
