= Zybułtowo =

- Village
- Location within Poland
- Coordinates: 53°30′N 20°11′E
- Country: Poland
- Voivodeship: Warmian-Masurian
- County: Ostróda
- Gmina: Grunwald
- Elevation: 202 m (663 ft)
- Population: 290

Zybułtowo [zɨbuu̯ˈtɔvɔ] (German: Seewalde) is a village in the administrative district of Gmina Grunwald, within Ostróda County, Warmian-Masurian Voivodeship, in northern Poland.
