= Szczepankowo, Ostróda County =

Szczepankowo
- Village
- Location within Poland
- Coordinates: 53°33′49″N 20°01′29″E
- Country: Poland
- Voivodeship: Warmian-Masurian
- County: Ostróda
- Gmina: Grunwald
- Population: 310

Szczepankowo [ʂt͡ʂɛpanˈkɔvɔ] (German: Steffenswalde) is a village in the administrative district of Gmina Grunwald, within Ostróda County, Warmian-Masurian Voivodeship, in northern Poland.
