= Frygnowo =

- Village
- Location within Poland
- Coordinates: 53°31′N 20°5′E
- Country: Poland
- Voivodeship: Warmian-Masurian
- County: Ostróda
- Gmina: Grunwald
- Population: 1,000

Frygnowo [frɨɡˈnɔvɔ] is a village in the administrative district of Gmina Grunwald, within Ostróda County, Warmian-Masurian Voivodeship, in northern Poland.

In 1914 the fields around the village were the main battlefield of the Battle of Tannenberg, which was eventually named after the nearby village of Tannenberg (Stębark), whence the final victory note was dispatched by the German commanders.

== Notable residents ==
- Reinhard Kollak (1915–1980), Luftwaffe pilot
