= Tymawa, Warmian-Masurian Voivodeship =

Tymawa
- Village
- Location within Poland
- Coordinates: 53°30′N 20°14′E
- Country: Poland
- Voivodeship: Warmian-Masurian
- County: Ostróda
- Gmina: Grunwald

Tymawa [tɨˈmava] is a village in the administrative district of Gmina Grunwald, within Ostróda County, Warmian-Masurian Voivodeship, in northern Poland.
