= Reinhard Kollak =

German Luftwaffe pilot (1915–1980)

- Born: 28 March 1915; Frögenau
- Died: 6 February 1980 (aged 64); Bonn
- Military career
- Allegiance: Nazi Germany (to 1945); West Germany
- Branch: Army; Luftwaffe
- Service years: 1933–45; 1956–67
- Rank: Stabsfeldwebel (Wehrmacht); Hauptfeldwebel (Bundeswehr)
- Units: ZG 1 NJG 1 NJG 4
- Conflicts: World War II: Battle of France; Defense of the Reich
- Awards: Knight's Cross of the Iron Cross

Reinhard Kollak (28 March 1915 – 6 February 1980) was a Luftwaffe night fighter ace and recipient of the Knight's Cross of the Iron Cross during World War II. The Knight's Cross of the Iron Cross, and its variants were the highest awards in the military and paramilitary forces of Nazi Germany during World War II.

Reinhard Kollak was the highest scoring non commissioned Nachtjagd pilot who, together with his Bordfunker Hans Herman, was credited with 49 victories in over 250 missions, all at night.

== Career ==
Kollak was born in East Prussia, in March 1915 and began his military career by joining the Reichswehr. In 1935, Kollak was transferred to the Luftwaffe where he trained as a fighter pilot. Upon completion of his training in the spring of 1940, Kollak was posted to the I./ZG 1 Zerstörergeschwader 1 and participated in the Battle of France and the Battle of Britain. In October 1940 Kollak was posted to the newly formed 1./NJG 1.

== Night fighter career ==
A map of part of the Kammhuber Line. The 'belt' and night fighter 'boxes' are shown.

Following the 1939 aerial Battle of the Heligoland Bight, the majority of RAF attacks shifted to the cover of darkness, initiating the Defence of the Reich campaign. By mid-1940, Generalmajor (Brigadier General) Josef Kammhuber had established a night air defense ground-controlled interception system (the Kammhuber Line). It consisted of a series of control sectors equipped with radars and searchlights and an associated night fighter. Each sector, named a Himmelbett ("canopy bed"), would direct the night fighter into visual range of target bombers. In 1941, the Luftwaffe started equipping night fighters with airborne radar such as the Lichtenstein radar. This airborne radar did not come into general use until early 1942.

Kollak claimed his first-night victory while flying as a Feldwebel with I. Gruppe of Nachtjagdgeschwader 1 (NJG 1—1st Night Fighter Wing), when he shot down an Armstrong Whitworth Whitley medium bomber in the early hours of 17 June 1941 in the vicinity of Hasselt. He remained with I./NJG 1 when it was redesignated 7./NJG 4 in May 1942 and on the night of 24/25 August 1942, shot down a Short Stirling heavy bomber as his tenth victory. He was awarded the German Cross in Gold (Deutsches Kreuz in Gold) on 12 April 1943. He received the Knight's Cross of the Iron Cross (Ritterkreuz des Eisernen Kreuzes) following his 29th aerial victory. The presentation was made by General Kammhuber on 29 August 1943 at the St. Trond airfield to both Kollak and Major Walter Ehle, the Gruppenkommandeur of II./NJG 1.

Kollak was the most successful pilot of III./NJG 4. Hans Herman joined the Luftwaffe in 1938 and served as Kollak's Bordfunker until the war's end.

== Post war ==
After the war, Reinhard found it difficult to adjust to civilian life before he rejoined the newly founded Bundeswehr in 1956, and retired in 1967 as a Hauptfeldwebel. On 6 February 1980, he was murdered at the age of 64 in Bad Godesberg.

== Summary of career ==
=== Aerial victory claims ===
According to Aders, Kollak was credited with 49 nocturnal aerial victories. Foreman, Parry and Mathews, authors of Luftwaffe Night Fighter Claims 1939 – 1945, researched the German Federal Archives and found records for 49 nocturnal victory claims. Mathews and Foreman also published Luftwaffe Aces — Biographies and Victory Claims, also listing Kollak with 49 claims.

Chronicle of aerial victories
Claim	Date	Time	Type	Location	Serial No./Squadron No.
– 1. Staffel of Nachtjagdgeschwader 1 –
1	17 June 1941	02:26	Whitley	vicinity of Hasselt	
2	26 July 1941	04:22	Whitley	1 km (0.62 mi) west of Courcelles	
3	6 August 1941	00:07	Wellington	2 km (1.2 mi) northeast of Maastricht	
4	6 August 1941	00:40	Wellington	5 km (3.1 mi) northwest of Marche	
5	6 August 1941	01:35	Whitley	5 km (3.1 mi) northeast of Liège	
6	7 August 1941	03:38	Wellington	15 km (9.3 mi) southeast of Wavre	
7	28 September 1941	22:45	Wellington	2 km (1.2 mi) northeast of Malvoisin	
8	12 October 1941	21:44	Stirling	35 km (22 mi) south of Charleroi	
– 7. Staffel of Nachtjagdgeschwader 4 –
9	12 August 1942	01:57	Stirling	20 km (12 mi) east of Namur	
10	25 August 1942	01:46	Stirling	Leuze, 27 km (17 mi) northwest of Mons	Stirling W7572/No. 149 Squadron RAF
11	17 September 1942	00:34	Stirling	8 km (5.0 mi) southwest of Gembloux	
12	17 September 1942	01:20	Lancaster		
13	19 September 1942	22:59	Stirling	6 km (3.7 mi) northeast of Revigny-sur-Ornain	
14	10 March 1943	01:59	Lancaster	north of Witry-lès-Reims	
15	10 March 1943	02:30	Lancaster	Taguebec	
16	11 March 1943	22:00	Halifax	1 km (0.62 mi) west of Malmaison	
17	11 April 1943	04:16	Stirling	1 km (0.62 mi) northwest of Sainte-Geneviève	
18	15 April 1943	02:11	Lancaster	27 km (17 mi) east of Reims	
19	16 April 1943	23:53	Lancaster	1 km (0.62 mi) north of Northeim	
– 1. Staffel of Nachtjagdgeschwader 1 –
20	12 June 1943	00:41	Halifax	south of Haamstede	
21	12 June 1943	01:00	Wellington	north of Westkapelle	Wellington HZ355/No. 429 Squadron RAF
22	12 June 1943	01:24	Lancaster	3 km (1.9 mi) west of Poortvliet	
– 7. Staffel of Nachtjagdgeschwader 4 –
23	25 June 1943	01:11	Halifax	2 km (1.2 mi) south of Roermond	
24	25 June 1943	01:39	Stirling	9 km (5.6 mi) south of Leuven	
25	4 July 1943	00:55	Wellington	9 km (5.6 mi) north of Liège	
26	4 July 1943	01:28	Halifax	5 km (3.1 mi) northwest of Liège	
27	4 July 1943	02:30	Halifax	22 km (14 mi) southeast of Brussels	
– 8. Staffel of Nachtjagdgeschwader 4 –
28	24 August 1943	01:16	four-engined bomber	northwest of Berlin	
29	28 August 1943	00:42	Lancaster	15 km (9.3 mi) southwest of Verdun	
30	28 August 1943	03:46	four-engined bomber	22 km (14 mi) north-northeast of Amiens	
31	18 November 1943	21:19	Stirling	northeast of Châlons-sur-Marne	
32	18 November 1943	21:40	Stirling	northeast of Châlons-sur-Marne	
33	24 February 1944	21:40	Lancaster	southeast of Metz	
34	24 February 1944	21:57	Lancaster	Metz	
35	24 February 1944	22:10	Lancaster	southeast of Metz	
36	26 February 1944	00:28	four-engined bomber	18 km (11 mi) east of Vervins	
37	2 May 1944	00:35	Lancaster	3 km (1.9 mi) south of Beaumont	
38	2 May 1944	00:41	Lancaster	3 km (1.9 mi) southwest of Châteaudun	
39	4 May 1944	00:26		15 km (9.3 mi) southwest of Châlons-sur-Marne	550 Sqn, Lancaster LL826 BQ-H
40	8 May 1944	00:36	four-engined bomber	15 km (9.3 mi) northeast of Romorantin-Lanthenay	
41	13 June 1944	00:22	four-engined bomber	Formerie	
42	13 June 1944	00:35	four-engined bomber	north of Rouen	
43	13 June 1944	00:40	four-engined bomber	north of Rouen	
44	15 July 1944	01:54	four-engined bomber	Bar-le-Duc	
45	15 July 1944	02:05	four-engined bomber	east of Saint-Dizier	Lancaster LL837/No. 550 Squadron RAF
46	19 July 1944	01:30	four-engined bomber	Romilly-sur-Seine	
47	19 July 1944	01:49	four-engined bomber	area south of Châlons	
48	19 July 1944	01:55	four-engined bomber	Bergères-lès-Vertus	
49	19 July 1944	02:05	four-engined bomber	Saint-Dizier	

=== Awards ===
- Flugzeugführerabzeichen
- Front Flying Clasp of the Luftwaffe in Gold
- Iron Cross (1939) 2nd and 1st Class
- Honour Goblet of the Luftwaffe (Ehrenpokal der Luftwaffe) on 28 September 1941 as Oberfeldwebel and pilot
- German Cross in Gold on 12 April 1943 as Oberfeldwebel in the 7./Nachtjagdgeschwader 4
- Knight's Cross of the Iron Cross on 29 August 1943 as Oberfeldwebel and pilot in the 8./Nachtjagdgeschwader 4 (Note: According to Scherzer as pilot in the 7./Nachtjagdgeschwader 4.)
