= Dąbrowo =

- Village
- Location within Poland
- Coordinates: 53°29′56″N 20°02′45″E
- Country: Poland
- Voivodeship: Warmian-Masurian
- County: Ostróda
- Gmina: Grunwald

Dąbrowo [dɔmˈbrɔvɔ] is a village in the administrative district of Gmina Grunwald, within Ostróda County, Warmian-Masurian Voivodeship, in northern Poland.
