= Glądy, Ostróda County =

Glądy
- Village
- Location within Poland
- Coordinates: 53°36′N 20°1′E
- Country: Poland
- Voivodeship: Warmian-Masurian
- County: Ostróda
- Gmina: Grunwald
- Population: 140

Glądy [ˈɡlɔndɨ] is a village in the administrative district of Gmina Grunwald, within Ostróda County, Warmian-Masurian Voivodeship, in northern Poland.
