= Jędrychowo, Ostróda County =

Jędrychowo
- Settlement
- Location within Poland
- Coordinates: 53°33′06″N 20°01′29″E
- Country: Poland
- Voivodeship: Warmian-Masurian
- County: Ostróda
- Gmina: Grunwald

Jędrychowo [jɛndrɨˈxɔvɔ] is a settlement in the administrative district of Gmina Grunwald, within Ostróda County, Warmian-Masurian Voivodeship, in northern Poland.
