= Temple of the Sibyl =

Folly in Poland

Coordinates: 51°24′54″N 21°57′19″E

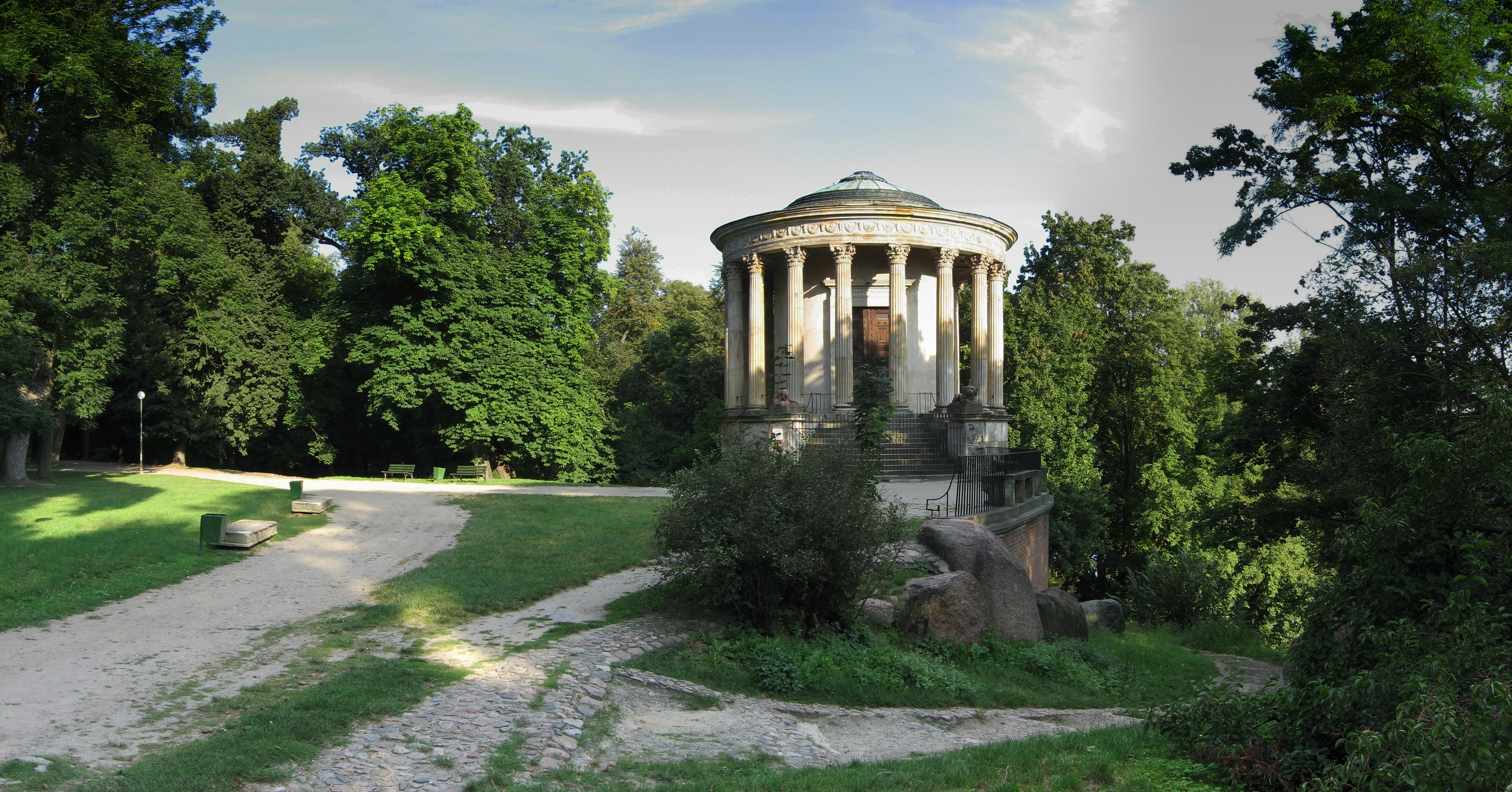
Temple of the Sibyl

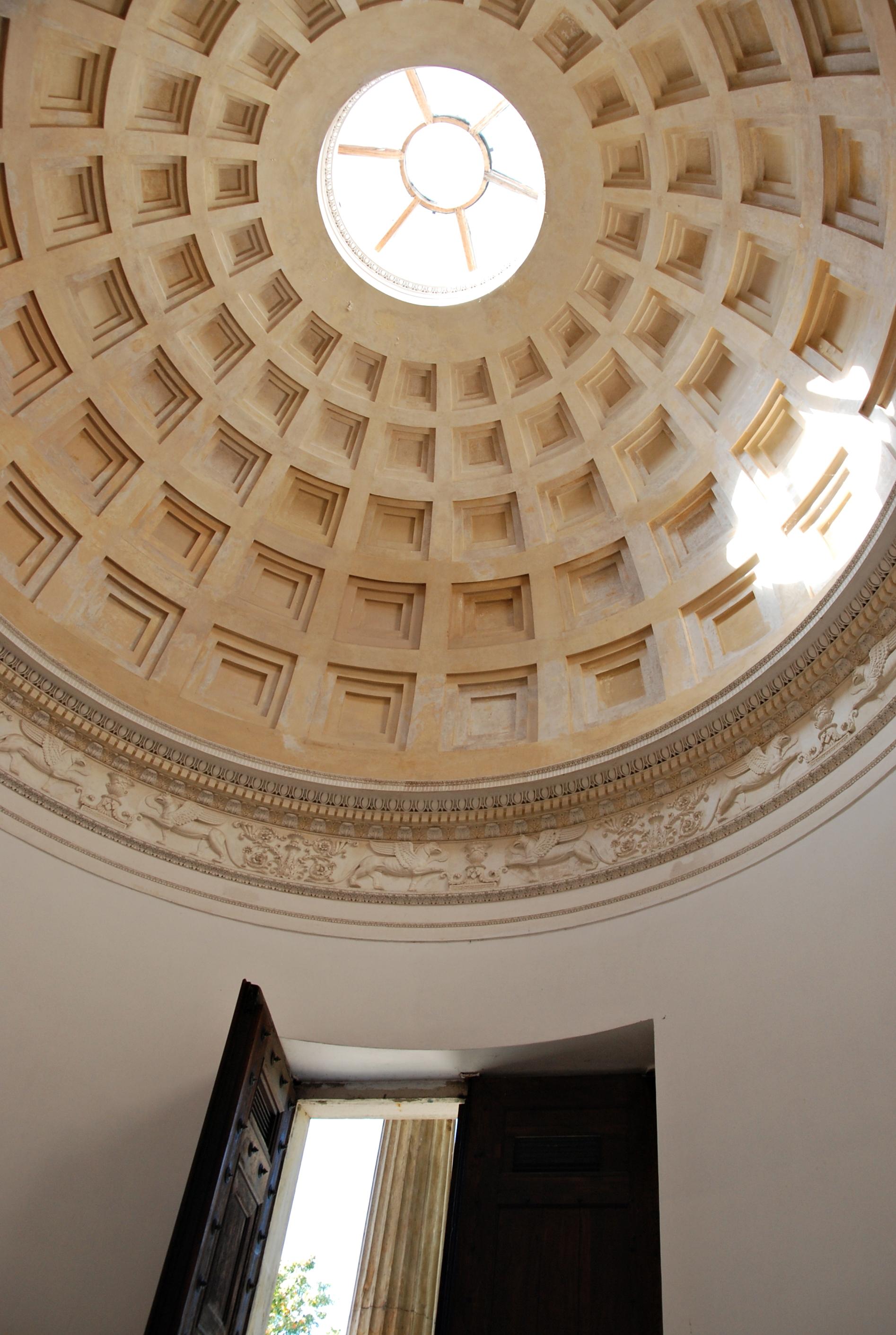
Interior, Temple of the Sibyl, featuring a rotunda, coffered dome, and oculus similar to the Pantheon of Rome

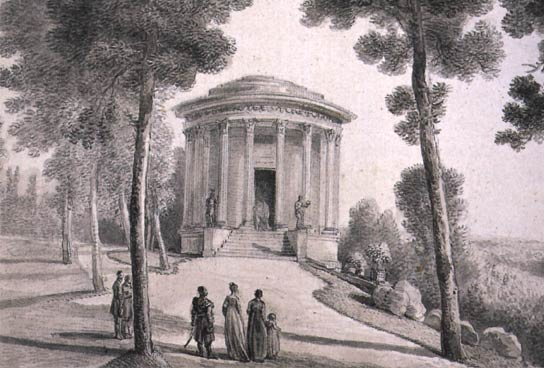
19th-century engraving of Temple of the Sibyl

The Temple of the Sibyl (Polish: Świątynia Sybilli), also known as the Temple of Memory, is a colonnaded round monopteral temple-like structure in Puławy, Poland, built at the turn of the 19th century as a museum by Izabela Czartoryska.

== History ==
The Temple of the Sibyl at Puławy opened in 1801, the structure was modeled after the similar monopteral Temple of Vesta in Tivoli, the site of the Tiburtine Sibyl, which was well known throughout Europe in engravings. The Puławy temple, designed by Polish architect Chrystian Piotr Aigner, memorialised Polish history and culture, and the glories and miseries of human life. Items kept in the Temple of the Sibyl included the Grunwald Swords and a large Royal Casket containing portraits and personal items of Poland's monarchs and queens.

During the November Uprising of 1830–31, the museum was closed. Czartoryska's son Adam Jerzy Czartoryski evacuated the surviving collections to Paris, France, where he housed them at the Hôtel Lambert. His son Władysław Czartoryski later reopened the museum in 1878 in the Grand Duchy of Kraków, in Austria-Hungary, as the Czartoryski Museum.

== Prus ==
In 1884, the Temple of the Sibyl was used by the Polish writer Bolesław Prus as the setting for his micro-story, Mold of the Earth.

The story's action takes place adjacent to the Temple, where there is a boulder overgrown with mold. At a certain moment the boulder magically transforms into a globe.

In his one-and-a-half-page micro-story, Prus identifies human societies with molds that, over the ages, blindly and impassively contest the surface of the globe. He thus provides a metaphor for the competitive struggle for existence that goes on among human communities.

In 1869, then-22-year-old Prus had briefly studied at the Agricultural and Forestry Institute that had been established on the old Czartoryski estate at Puławy. Earlier, he had spent several years of his early childhood in Puławy.

== See also ==
- Mold of the Earth
- Pythia
- Temple of Vesta, Tivoli
- Tiburtine Sibyl
- Temple of Diana
