= A Legend of Old Egypt =

Short story by Bolesław Prus

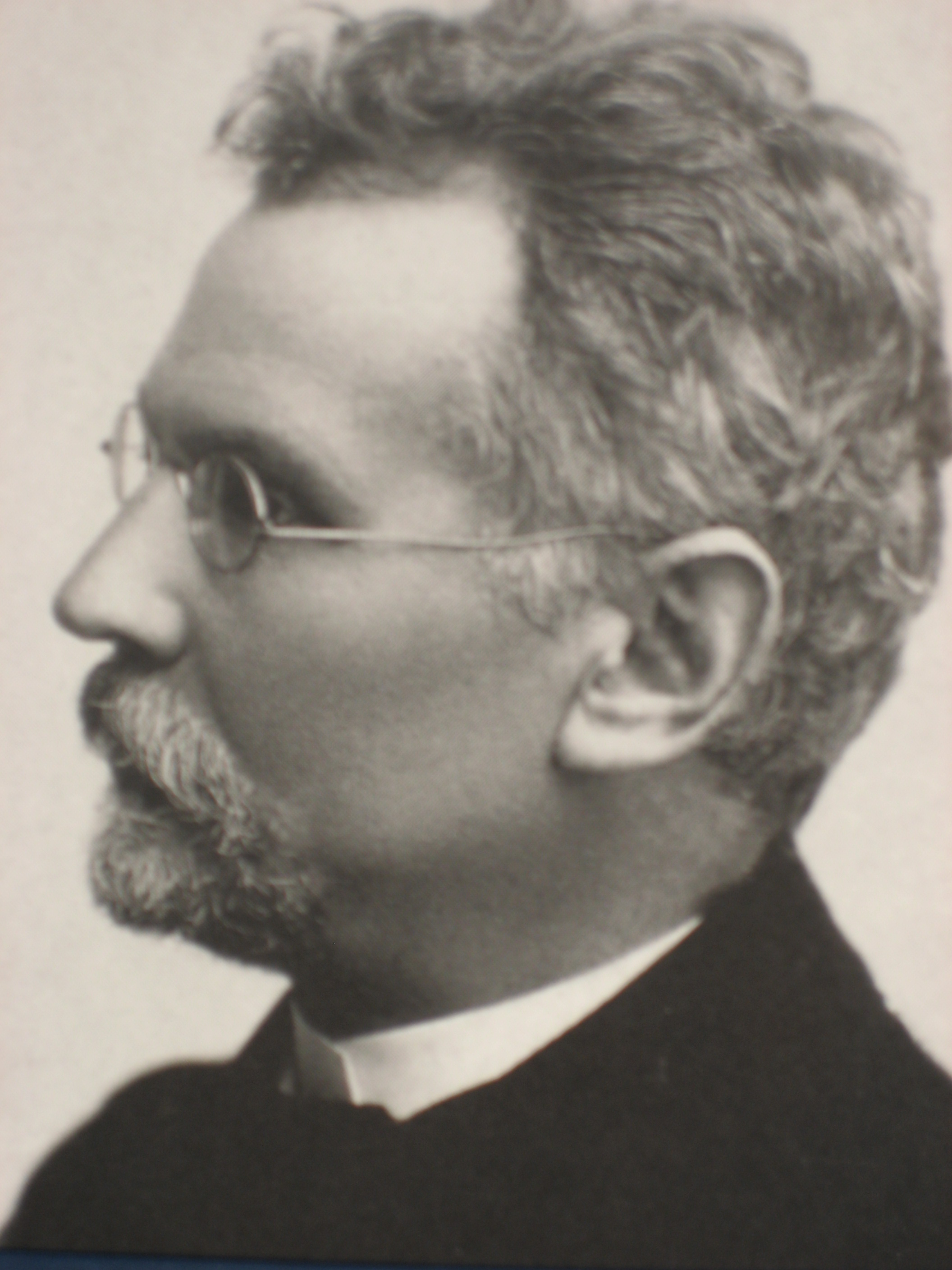
Bolesław Prus

"A Legend of Old Egypt" (Polish: "Z legend dawnego Egiptu") is a seven-page short story by Bolesław Prus, originally published January 1, 1888, in New Year's supplements to the Warsaw Kurier Codzienny (Daily Courier) and Tygodnik Ilustrowany (Illustrated Weekly). It was his first piece of historical fiction and later served as a preliminary sketch for his only historical novel, Pharaoh (1895), which would be serialized in the Illustrated Weekly.

"A Legend of Old Egypt" and Pharaoh show unmistakable kinships in setting, theme and denouement.

== Plot ==
"A Legend of Old Egypt"
- Short story by Bolesław Prus
- Original title: 'Z legend dawnego Egiptu'
- Translator: Christopher Kasparek
- Country: Poland
- Language: Polish
- Genre: Historical short story

Publication
- Published in: Kurier Codzienny, and Tygodnik Ilustrowany (Warsaw)
- Media type: Print
- Publication date: 1 January 1888

Chronology
—	Pharaoh

The centenarian pharaoh Ramses is breathing his last, "his chest... invested by a stifling incubus [that drains] the blood from his heart, the strength from his arm, and at times even the consciousness from his brain." He commands the wisest physician at the Temple of Karnak to prepare him a medicine that kills or cures at once. After Ramses drinks the potion, he summons an astrologer and asks what the stars show. The astrologer replies that heavenly alignments portend the death of a member of the dynasty; Ramses should not have taken the medicine today. Ramses then asks the physician how soon he will die; the physician replies that before sunrise either Ramses will be hale as a rhino, or his sacred ring will be on the hand of his grandson and successor, Horus.

Ramses commands that Horus be taken to the hall of the pharaohs, there to await his last words and the royal ring. Amid the moonlight, Horus seats himself on the porch, whose steps lead down to the River Nile, and watches the crowds gathering to greet their soon-to-be new pharaoh. As Horus contemplates the reforms that he would like to introduce, something stings his leg; he thinks it was a bee. A courtier remarks that it is fortunate that it was not a spider, whose venom can be deadly at this time of year.

Horus orders edicts drawn up, ordaining peace with Egypt's enemies, the Ethiopians, and forbidding that prisoners of war have their tongues torn out on the field of battle; lowering the people's rents and taxes; giving slaves days of rest and forbidding their caning without a court judgment; recalling Horus' teacher Jethro, whom Ramses had banished for instilling in Horus an aversion to war and compassion for the people; moving, to the royal tombs, the body of Horus' mother Sephora which, because of the mercy that she had shown the slaves, Ramses had buried among the slaves; and releasing Horus' beloved, Berenice, from the cloister where Ramses had imprisoned her.

Meanwhile, Horus' leg has become more painful. The physician examines it and finds that Horus has been stung by a very poisonous spider. He has only a short time to live.

The ministers enter with the edicts that they have drawn up at his bidding, and Horus awaits the death of Ramses so that he may touch and thus confirm his edicts with the sacred ring of the pharaohs.

As death approaches Horus, and it becomes increasingly unlikely that he will have time to touch every edict with the ring, he lets successive edicts slip to the floor: the edict on the people's rents and the slaves' labor; the edict on peace with the Ethiopians; the edict moving his mother Sephora's remains; the edict recalling Jethro from banishment; the edict on not tearing out the tongues of prisoners taken in war. There remains only the edict freeing his love, Berenice.

Just then, the high priest's deputy runs into the hall and announces a miracle. Ramses has recovered and invites Horus to join him in a lion hunt at sunrise.

Horus looked with failing eye across the Nile, where the light shone in Berenice's prison, and two [...] sanguineous tears rolled down his face.

"You do not answer, Horus?" asked Ramses' messenger, in surprise.

"Don't you see he's dead?..." whispered the wisest physician in Karnak.

Behold, human hopes are vain before the decrees that the Eternal writes in fiery signs upon the heavens.

== Inspiration ==
The inspiration for the short story was investigated in a 1962 paper by the foremost Prus scholar, Zygmunt Szweykowski.

What prompted Prus, erstwhile foe of historical fiction, to take time in December 1887, in the midst of writing ongoing newspaper instalments of his second novel, The Doll (1887–89), to pen his first historical story? What could have moved him so powerfully?

Szweykowski follows several earlier commentators in concluding that it was contemporary German dynastic events. In late October 1887, Germany's first modern emperor, the warlike Kaiser Wilhelm I, had taken cold during a hunt and soon appeared to be at death's door; by November 2 a rumor spread that he had died. He rallied, however. Meanwhile, his son and successor, the reform-minded Crown Prince Friedrich (in English, "Frederick"), an inveterate smoker, had for several months been undergoing treatment for a throat ailment; the foreign press had written of a dire situation, but only on November 12 did the official German press announce that he in fact had throat cancer.

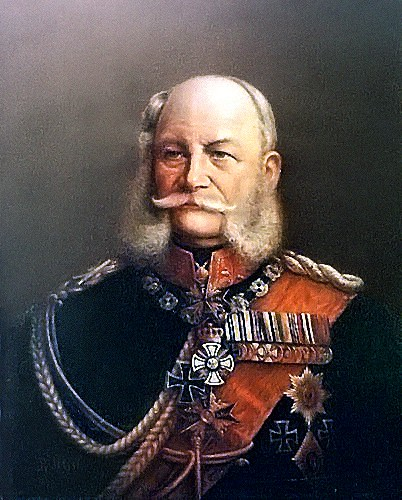
Wilhelm I

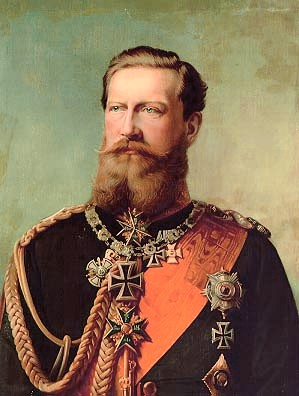
Friedrich III

Prince Frederick had been an object of lively interest among progressive Europeans, who hoped that his eventual reign would bring a broad-based parliamentary system, democratic freedoms, peace, and equal rights for non-German nationalities, including Poles, within the German Empire.

Szweykowski points out that the "Legend's" contrast between the despotic centenarian Pharaoh Ramses and his humane grandson and successor Horus was, in its historic German prototypes, doubled, with Prince Frederick actually facing two antagonists: his father, Kaiser Wilhelm I, and the "Iron Chancellor", Otto von Bismarck. In a curious further parallel, a month after Kaiser Wilhelm's illness, Bismarck suffered a stroke.

Bolesław Prus, who in his "Weekly Chronicles" frequently touched on political events in Germany, devoted much of his December 4, 1887, column to Prince Frederick and his illness. The latest news from Germany and from San Remo, Italy, where the Prince was undergoing treatment, had been encouraging. Prus wrote with relief that "the Successor to the German Throne reportedly does not have cancer." By mid-December, however, the politically inspired optimism in the Berlin press had again yielded to a sense of despair.

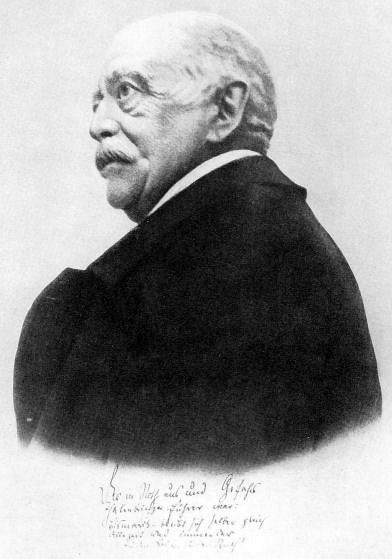
Bismarck

"It was then [states Szweykowski] that Prus wrote 'A Legend of Old Egypt,' shifting a contemporary subject into the past. Prus must have found this maneuver necessary in order to bring to completion what had not yet been completed, avoid sensationalism, and gain perspectives that generalized a particular fact to all human life; the atmosphere of legend was particularly favorable to this.

"In putting Horus to death while Prince Frederick still lived, Prus anticipated events, but he erred only in details, not in the essence of the matter, which was meant to document the idea that 'human hopes are vain before the order of the world.' Frederick, to be sure, did mount the throne (as Frederick III) in March the following year (Kaiser Wilhelm I died on March 9, 1888) and for a brief time it seemed that a new era would begin for Germany, and indirectly for Europe."

But it was not to be. Frederick III survived his father by only 99 days, dying at Potsdam on June 15, 1888, and leaving the German throne to his bellicose son Wilhelm II, who a quarter-century later would help launch World War I.

The connection between the German dynastic events and the genesis of Prus' "Legend of Old Egypt" was recognized in the Polish press already in 1888, even before Frederick's accession to short-lived impotent power, by a pseudonymous writer who styled himself "Logarithmus."

As Szweykowski observes, "the direct connection between the short story and political events in contemporaneous Germany doubtless opens new suggestions for the genesis of Pharaoh."

== Influences ==
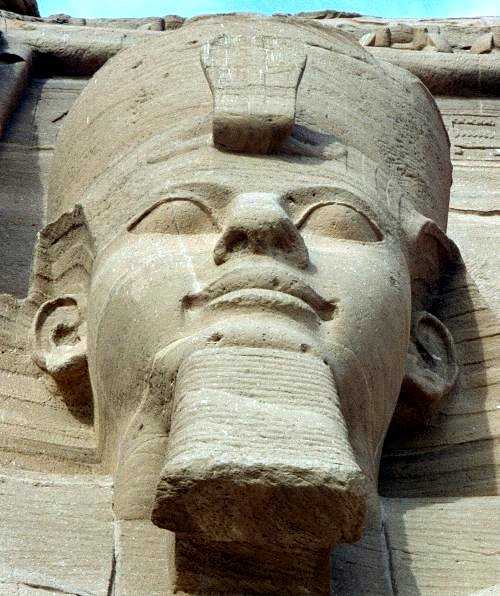
Ramses II

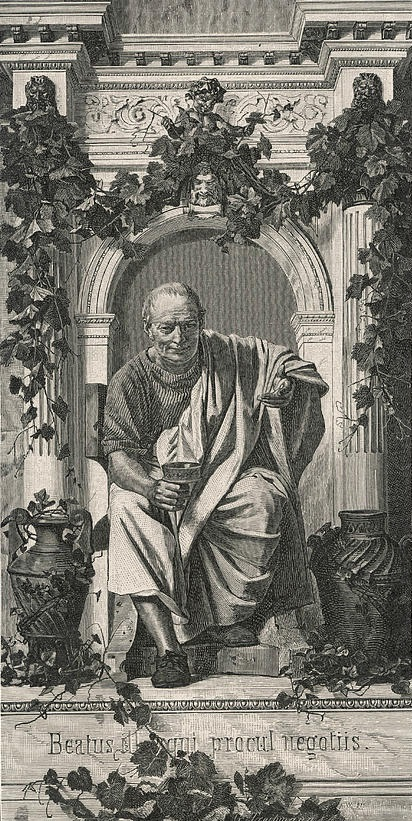
Horace

In addition to the German elements, there were other influences on the composition of the short story. These included:

- the use of a device inspired by the ancient Greek chorus, in this case stating at the opening and at the end, and repeating once in the course of the text, a sentiment about the vanity of human hopes before the decrees of heaven;
- astrological echoes from Prus' own newspaper account of the solar eclipse that he had witnessed at Mława, north of Warsaw, four months earlier, on August 19, 1887;
- the history of Pharaoh Ramses II ("the Great"), who had lived nearly as long as the "Legend's" "hundred-year-old Ramses" (who is also referred to in Prus' story as "great Ramses") and had outlived dozens of his own potential successors;
- and the Roman poet Horace's sentiment, "Non omnis moriar" ("I shall not die altogether"), which Prus cites in Polish in the "Legend" and will cite in the original Latin at the end of The Doll, which he is also writing just then.

== Characters ==
For Prus it was axiomatic that historical fiction must distort history. Characteristically, at times, in historical fiction, his choices of characters' names show considerable arbitrariness: nowhere more so than in "A Legend of Old Egypt."

- The protagonist is assigned the name of the hawk-headed Egyptian god Horus;
- Horus' mother, the Greek variant of the name of the Biblical Moses' wife, Sephora (Exodus 2:21);
- Horus' teacher, the name of Moses' father-in-law, Jethro (Exodus 3:1); and
- Horus' beloved, a Greek name that means "bearer of victory", Berenice (there were several Egyptian queens of that name in the Ptolemaic period).

== Pharaoh ==
"A Legend of Old Egypt," published in 1888, shows unmistakable kinships in setting, theme and denouement with Prus' 1895 novel Pharaoh, for which the short story served as a preliminary sketch.

Both works of fiction are set in ancient Egypt — the "Legend," at some indeterminate time, presumably during the 19th or 20th Dynasty, when all the Ramesside pharaohs reigned; Pharaoh, at the fall of the 20th Dynasty and New Kingdom in the 11th century BCE.

In each, the protagonist (Horus, and Ramses XIII, respectively) aspires to introduce social reforms. (Ramses also plans preventive war against a rising Assyrian power.)

In each, the protagonist perishes before he can implement his plans — though, in the novel, some of these are eventually realized by Ramses' adversary and successor, Herihor.

== See also ==
- "The Barrel Organ"
- "Fading Voices"
- "The Living Telegraph" (a micro-story by Bolesław Prus).
- Micro-story
- "Mold of the Earth" (a micro-story by Bolesław Prus).
- Pharaoh (historical novel by Bolesław Prus).
- Political fiction
- Prose poetry
- "Shades" (a micro-story by Bolesław Prus).
- "The Waistcoat"

== Sources ==
- Zygmunt Szweykowski, "Geneza noweli 'Z legend dawnego Egiptu'" ("The Genesis of the Short Story, 'A Legend of Old Egypt,'" originally published 1962), reprinted in his book, Nie tylko o Prusie: szkice (Not Only about Prus: Sketches), Poznań, Wydawnictwo Poznańskie, 1967, pp. 256–61, 299-300.
- Krystyna Tokarzówna and Stanisław Fita, Bolesław Prus, 1847-1912: kalendarz życia i twórczości, pod redakcją Zygmunta Szweykowskiego (Bolesław Prus, 1847-1912: a Calendar of [His] Life and Work, edited by Zygmunt Szweykowski), Warsaw, Państwowy Instytut Wydawniczy, 1969.
- Christopher Kasparek, "Prus' Pharaoh: the Creation of a Historical Novel", The Polish Review, 1994, no. 1, pp. 45–50.
- Christopher Kasparek, "Prus' Pharaoh and the Solar Eclipse", The Polish Review, 1997, no. 4, pp. 471–78.
- Bolesław Prus, Pharaoh, translated from the Polish by Christopher Kasparek (2nd, revised ed.), Warsaw, Polestar Publications (ISBN 83-88177-01-X), and New York, Hippocrene Books, 2001.
- Jakub A. Malik, Ogniste znaki Przedwiecznego. Szyfry transcendencji w noweli Bolesława Prusa "Z legend dawnego Egiptu". Próba odkodowania ("Fiery Signs of the Eternal: Ciphers of Transcendence in Bolesław Prus' Short Story 'A Legend of Old Egypt': An Attempt at Decoding"), in Jakub A. Malik, ed., Poszukiwanie świadectw. Szkice o problematyce religijnej w literaturze II połowy XIX i początku XX wieku (Search for Testimonies: Sketches on Religious Themes in Literature of the Second Half of the 19th and the Early 20th Centuries), Lublin, Wydawnictwo TN KUL, 2009.
