= Pacółtówko =

- Village
- Location within Poland
- Coordinates: 53°32′58″N 20°9′48″E
- Country: Poland
- Voivodeship: Warmian-Masurian
- County: Ostróda
- Gmina: Grunwald
- Population: 70

Pacółtówko [pat͡suu̯ˈtufkɔ] is a village in the administrative district of Gmina Grunwald, within Ostróda County, Warmian-Masurian Voivodeship, in northern Poland.
