= Dylewko =

- Settlement
- Location within Poland
- Coordinates: 53°31′43″N 20°02′08″E
- Country: Poland
- Voivodeship: Warmian-Masurian
- County: Ostróda
- Gmina: Grunwald
- Elevation: 200 m (660 ft)
- Population: 48
- Website: http://dylewko.pl.tl

Dylewko [dɨˈlɛfkɔ] is a settlement in the administrative district of Gmina Grunwald, within Ostróda County, Warmian-Masurian Voivodeship, in northern Poland.
