= Rzepki, Warmian-Masurian Voivodeship =

Rzepki
- Settlement
- Location within Poland
- Coordinates: 53°32′09″N 20°06′26″E
- Country: Poland
- Voivodeship: Warmian-Masurian
- County: Ostróda
- Gmina: Grunwald

Rzepki [ˈʐɛpki] is a settlement in the administrative district of Gmina Grunwald, within Ostróda County, Warmian-Masurian Voivodeship, in northern Poland.
