= Grabiczki =

- Settlement
- Location within Poland
- Coordinates: 53°31′39″N 20°05′20″E
- Country: Poland
- Voivodeship: Warmian-Masurian
- County: Ostróda
- Gmina: Grunwald

Grabiczki [ɡraˈbit͡ʂki] is a settlement in the administrative district of Gmina Grunwald, within Ostróda County, Warmian-Masurian Voivodeship, in northern Poland.
