= Shades (story) =

1885 micro-story by Bolesław Prus

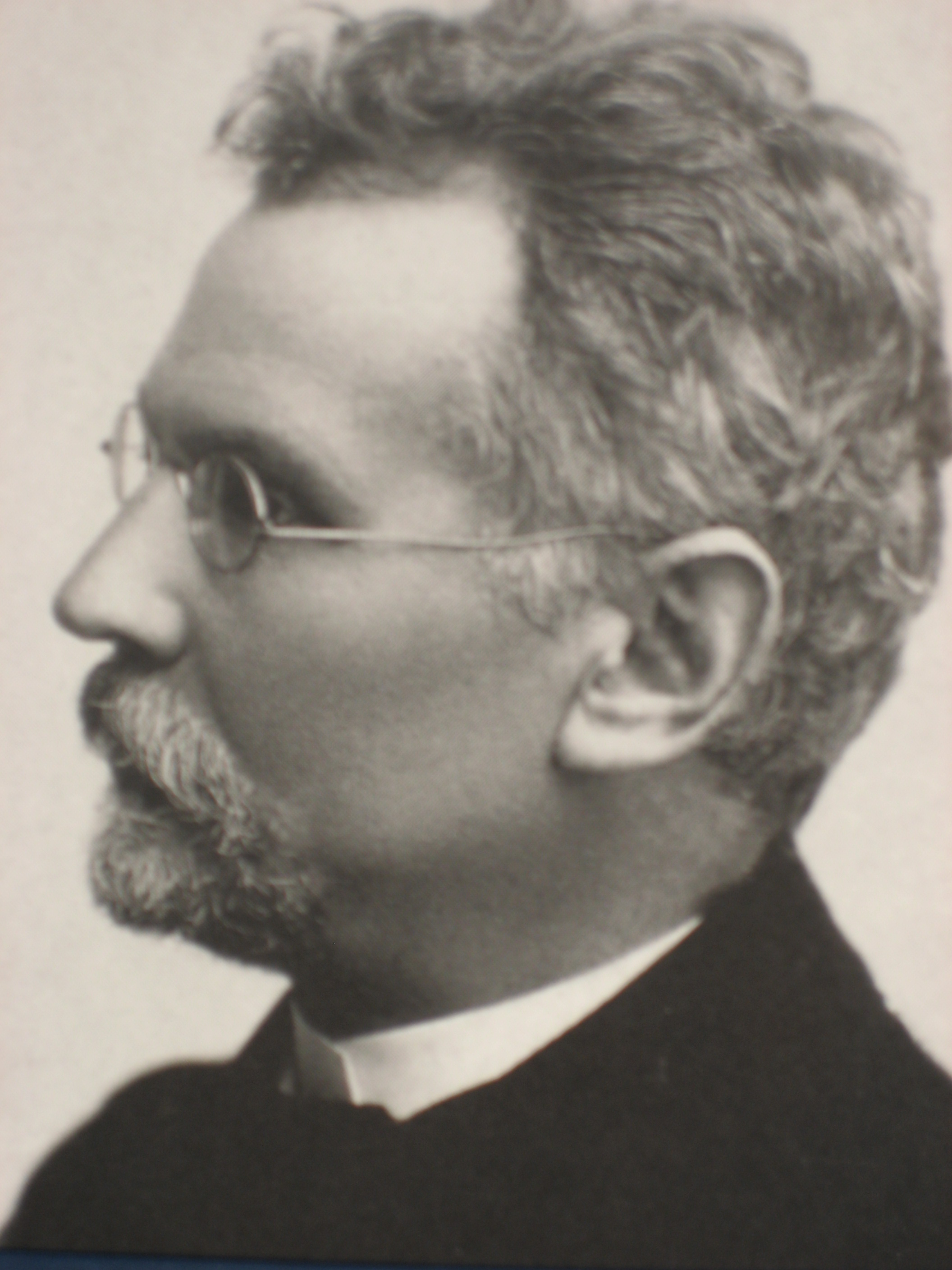
Bolesław Prus.

"Shades" (Polish: "Cienie") is one of Bolesław Prus' shortest micro-stories. Written in 1885, it comes from a period of pessimism in his life caused partly by the 1883 failure of Nowiny (News), a Warsaw daily that he had been editing for less than a year. Prus, the "lamplighter" who had striven to dispel darkness and its attendant "fear, madness, and mischief," had failed to sufficiently interest the public in Nowiny, his Positivist "observatory of societal facts," .

== Themes ==
"Shades" is one of several micro-stories by Bolesław Prus that were inspired partly by 19th-century French prose poetry.

Prus scholar Zygmunt Szweykowski writes:

Night, darkness, unfamiliar locales with indeterminate ... topography, and indeed any powerful phenomenon, arouse anxiety in Prus, prompting him to personify nature. He conjures up a world – of living, mysterious, menacing things ... – full of uncanny experiences, strange shapes, striking contrasts of light and shade. The latter realm of sensations, especially, is represented most interestingly; extraordinary moments sensitize Prus to changes in light, especially to its absence; from this there spring ... poetic suggestions, in his works ("Shades" [1885], "In the Light of the Moon" [1884], etc.), of the lives of shades. ...

Based on a thorough familiarity with nature and with scientific abstractions, which Prus knows consummately how to make concrete, the writer creates an original world, not encountered in other authors, of splendid visions striking in their perspectives of infinity; these translate the longings, yearnings, and struggles of the human soul to the universe ("In the Light of the Moon") or bring to light a higher, religious, mythic, or legendary order of the universe ("New Year" [1880]).

These... perspectives, present at the start of Prus' writing career, intensify markedly after 1882, with the failure of Nowiny [News]. The writer's attitude to his art changes ...; that art becomes ever closer to him, and we see his writing gain remarkably in depth, and humor assume a distinct role, as Prus begins to avoid writing [the kinds of] pieces [he had been writing, which had been motivated by] a desire to amuse readers [with] jokes and jibes ...

Prus' micro-story "Shades" comprises two parts. The first half evokes the above-described atmosphere of dread, via Prus' description of an eternal contest between light and darkness. The second half describes the efforts of one of a number of nameless lamplighters to dispel the darkness, for as long as his finite lifespan permits.

== See also ==
- "Mold of the Earth" (a micro-story by Bolesław Prus).
- "The Living Telegraph" (a micro-story by Bolesław Prus).
- Prose poetry.
- "A Legend of Old Egypt" (Prus' first historical short story).
- Darkness.

== Sources ==
- Christopher Kasparek, "Two Micro-Stories by Bolesław Prus," The Polish Review, 1995, no. 1, pp. 99–103.
- Zygmunt Szweykowski, Twórczość Bolesława Prusa (The Writings of Bolesław Prus), 2nd ed., Warsaw, Państwowy Instytut Wydawniczy, 1972.
- Barbara Bobrowska, "Latarnicy Wóycickiego i Prusa, czyli o 'fizjologii parabolicznej'" ("Wóycicki's and Prus' Lamplighters: 'parabolic physiology'"), in Małe narracje Prusa (Prus's Small Narratives), Gdańsk, słowo/obraz terytoria, 2004, pp. 113–34.
