= Łącko =

Łącko [wɔnt͡skɔ] may refer to:

- Łącko, Kuyavian-Pomeranian Voivodeship (north-central Poland)
- Łącko, Lesser Poland Voivodeship (south Poland)
- Łącko, Warmian-Masurian Voivodeship (north Poland)
- Łącko, West Pomeranian Voivodeship (north-west Poland)

== See also ==
- Läckö
