= Wróble, Warmian-Masurian Voivodeship =

Wróble
- Village
- Location within Poland
- Coordinates: 53°34′10″N 20°05′35″E
- Country: Poland
- Voivodeship: Warmian-Masurian
- County: Ostróda
- Gmina: Grunwald

Wróble [ˈvrublɛ] is a village in the administrative district of Gmina Grunwald, within Ostróda County, Warmian-Masurian Voivodeship, in northern Poland.
