= Uman (disambiguation) =

Uman is a city in central Ukraine.

Uman may also refer to:

== Places ==
- Uman Raion, Ukraine
- Uman Island, Federated States of Micronesia
- Uman, Federated States of Micronesia, a municipality
- Umán, a city in Mexico
- Umán Municipality, a municipality in Mexico
  - Umán railway station
- Uman (Peru), a mountain in Peru
- Uman uezd a subdivision in Russian Empire based on the city of Uman

== Surname ==
- Alexandr Uman, a founder of the Belarusian alternative rock band Bi-2
- Just Uman, a founder of the French music band Ocean Drive
- Martin A. Uman (born 1936) is an American engineer
- Naomi Uman, American and Mexican experimental filmmaker and a visual artist

== Other uses ==
- Uman language, an extinct language of Brazil
- SS Uman, ship

== See also ==
- Oman (disambiguation), a country on the Arabian Peninsula
