= Lubian =

- Village
- Location within Poland
- Coordinates: 53°29′N 20°11′E
- Country: Poland
- Voivodeship: Warmian-Masurian
- County: Ostróda
- Gmina: Grunwald
- Vehicle registration: NOS

Lubian [ˈlubjan] is a village in the administrative district of Gmina Grunwald, within Ostróda County, Warmian-Masurian Voivodeship, in northern Poland. It is situated on the eastern shore of Lake Lubiańskie in the historic region of Masuria.

Lubian was founded by Polish people, and as of 1599 its population was solely Polish.
