= Marcinkowo, Ostróda County =

Marcinkowo
- Village
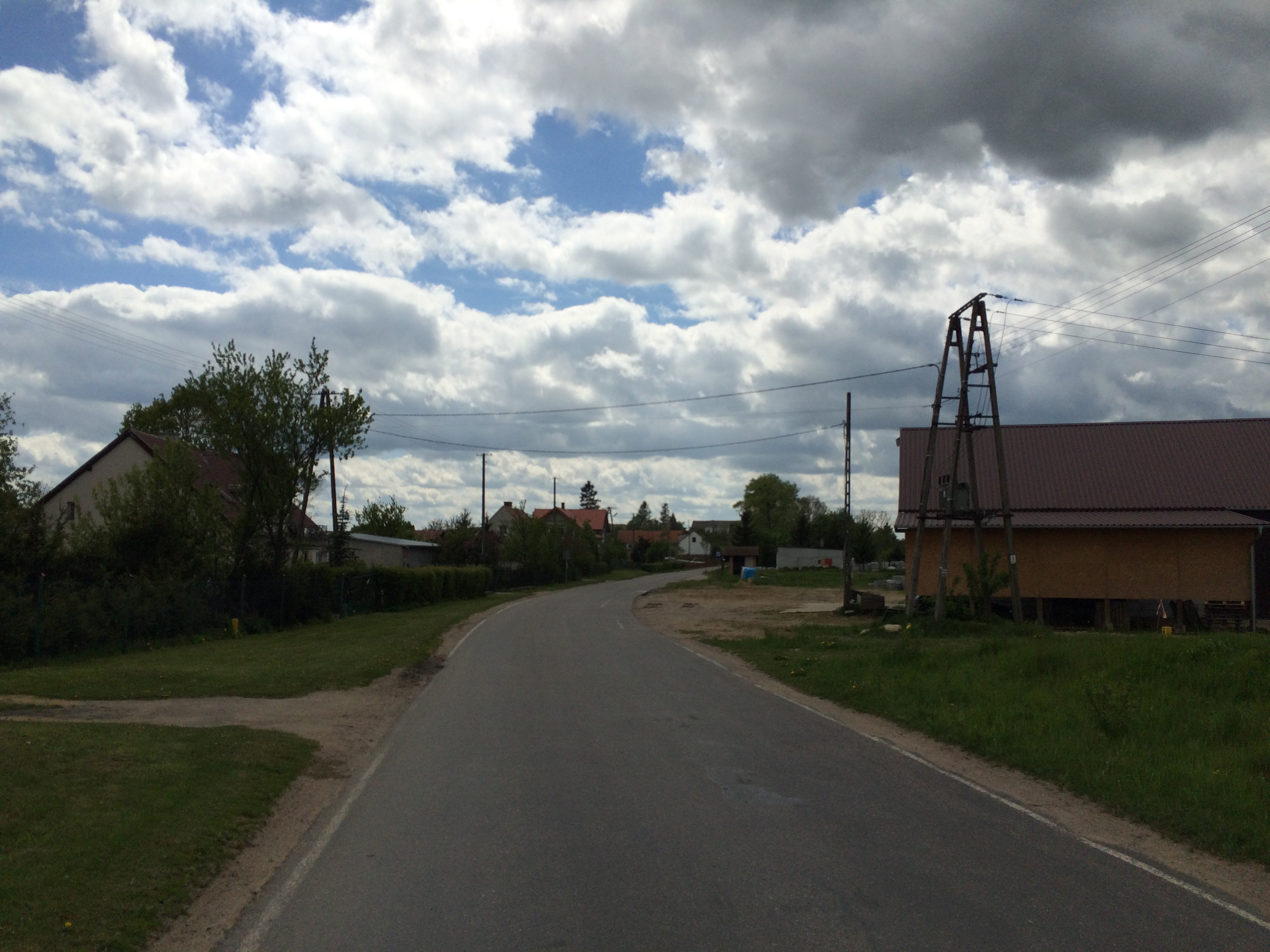

- Location within Poland
- Coordinates: 53°30′32″N 20°02′10″E
- Country: Poland
- Voivodeship: Warmian-Masurian
- County: Ostróda
- Gmina: Grunwald
- Population: 240

Marcinkowo [mart͡ɕinˈkɔvɔ] is a village in the administrative district of Gmina Grunwald, within Ostróda County, Warmian-Masurian Voivodeship, in northern Poland.
