= Pacółtowo, Ostróda County =

Pacółtowo
- Village
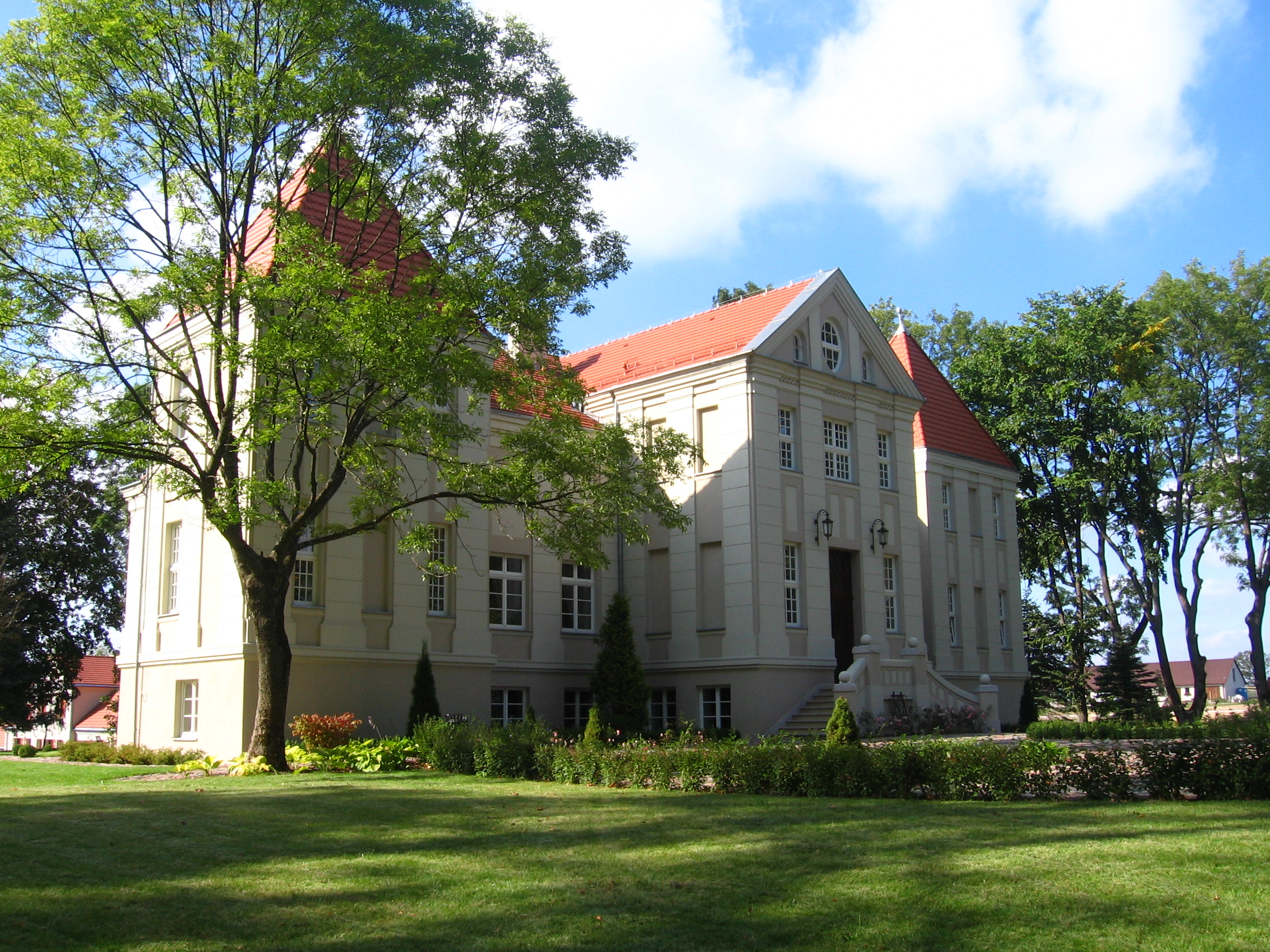
- Pacółtowo Palace

- Location within Poland
- Coordinates: 53°32′N 20°9′E
- Country: Poland
- Voivodeship: Warmian-Masurian
- County: Ostróda
- Gmina: Grunwald

Population
  - Total: 220
- Time zone: UTC+1 (CET)
  - Summer (DST): UTC+2 (CEST)
- Vehicle registration: NOS

Pacółtowo [pat͡suu̯ˈtɔvɔ] is a village in the administrative district of Gmina Grunwald, within Ostróda County, Warmian-Masurian Voivodeship, in northern Poland.
