= Karmabai =

Devotee of Krishna (1615 - 1702)

Bhakt Shiromani Karmabai
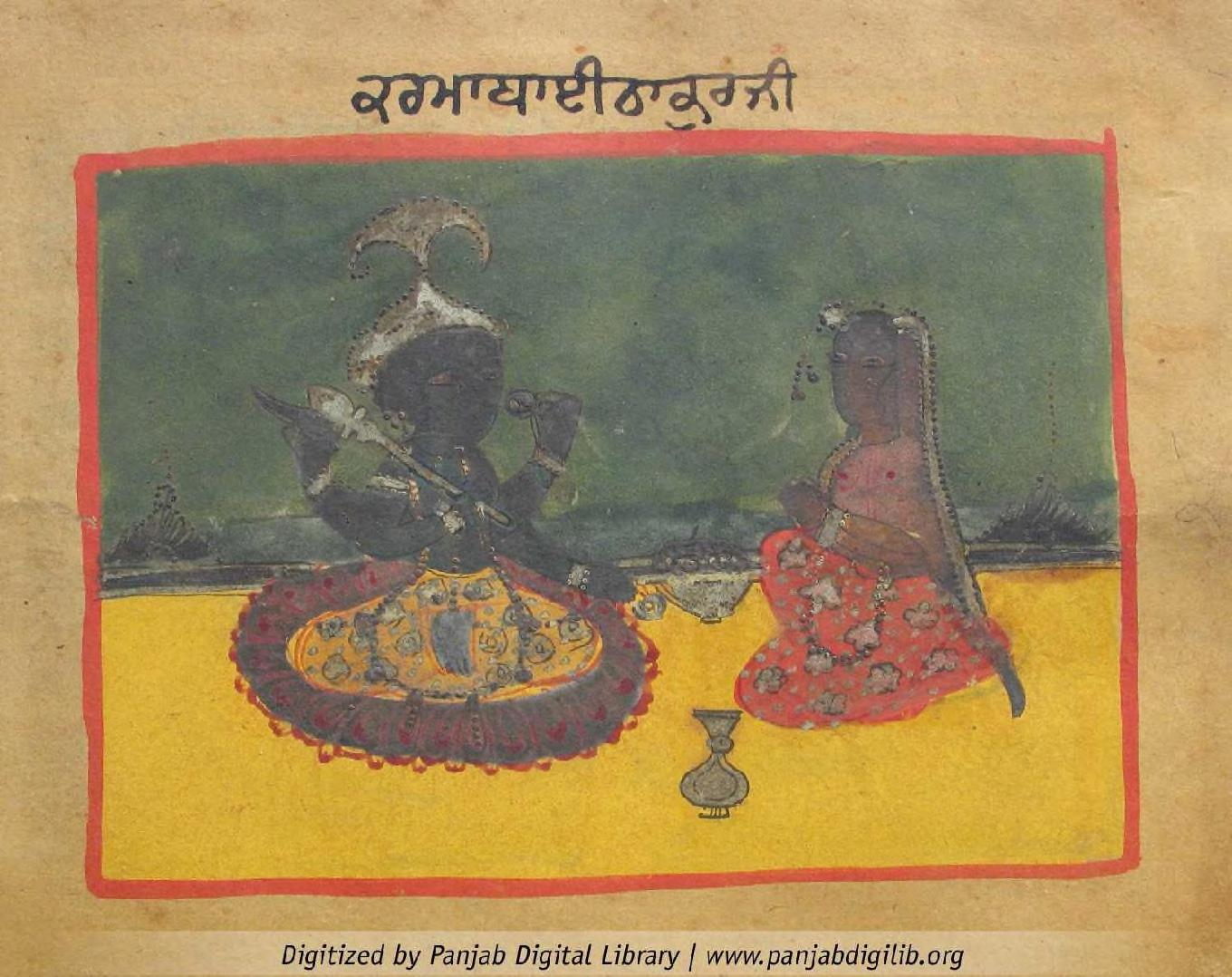
- Sikh manuscript painting of Karmabai (right), from a folio within an illustrated manuscript of the Prem Ambodh Pothi
- Born: 20 August 1615; Kalwa, Nagaur district, Rajasthan
- Died: 30 November 1702 (aged 88); Puri, Odisha, India
- Known for: Offering khichdi to Krishna

Karmabai (20 August 1615 - 30 November 1702), also known as Bhakt Shiromani Karma Bai, was a devotee of Krishna, an incarnation of Vishnu, from the village of Kalwa in Nagaur district, Rajasthan in 17th century. Karmabai is celebrated in Hinduism for her piety and the miraculous events associated with her offerings to Krishna. Her legacy is commemorated in Puri, Odisha, where she is said to have spent her later years and where her samadhi (memorial shrine) is revered during the Jagannath Rath Yatra.

== Early life ==
Karmabai was born on 20 August 1615, into the family of Jeevanram Dudi and Ratni Devi in Kalwa, a village in Rajasthan’s Nagaur district into a Jat family. She was raised in a devout Vaishnava household, Karmabai grew up observing her father’s deep devotion to Krishna. Her early life was marked by simplicity and piety, shaped by the rural Jat community’s values and traditions.

== Legend ==
Karmabai’s popular story centers on her literal interpretation of her father’s instructions, showcasing her innocent yet steadfast faith. When Jeevanram Dudi left for an outstation trip, he entrusted the young Karmabai—believed to be around 13 years old—with the responsibility of offering bhog (food) to Krishna before eating herself. Taking his words to heart, Karmabai prepared khichdo, a simple dish of bajra(pearl millet) and placed it before Krishna’s idol. When the idol did not “eat,” she refused to eat herself, waiting faithfully for the deity to accept her offering.

Moved by her sincerity, Krishna is said to have appeared before her and consumed the khichdi. This divine interaction continued daily until her father’s return. When Karmabai recounted the events, her father, initially skeptical, asked her to prove it. In response, she pleaded with Krishna, who appeared again to affirm her devotion. This miracle solidified her reputation as a true devotee.

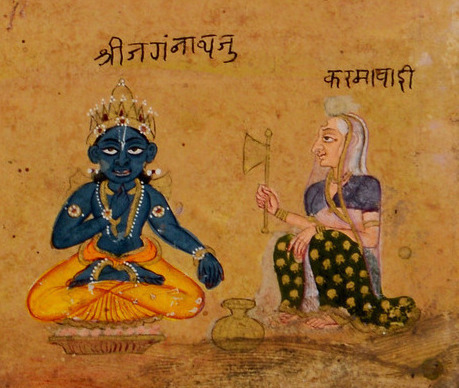
Karmabai with Jagannath, Bhaktamal illustration, Bundelkhand, circa late 18th century

The story spread to the saints of Puri, Odisha, who invited Karmabai to offer her khichdi to Jagannath, a form of Krishna. According to tradition, Krishna appeared in Puri as well, accepting her offering. Karmabai eventually settled in Puri, where her devotion became intertwined with the Jagannath tradition. A folk song commemorates her act:

Thali bhar kar lyayi khichado upar ghee ki baatki! Jeemo mhara Shyam dhani jeemave beti Jat ki!” (She brought a plate full of khichdi topped with ghee; our Krishna eats from the hands of the Jat daughter)

== Later years and legacy ==
Some narratives, such as one from the 18th-century text Bhaktavijaya, depict Karmabai’s life in Puri as one marked by both devotion and profound personal loss. After moving to Puri, she faced immense trials: the death of her husband Dhunu, her son Raghu, her daughter-in-law Lakshmi, and her grandson Vishnu. Despite these tragedies, Karmabai’s faith in Jagannath remained unshaken. A Vaishnava saint, seeing her grief, gave her a small image of Krishna as a baby butter-thief and advised her to treat it as her own child. Karmabai embraced this practice, caring for the idol with maternal love, bathing it, dressing it, and offering it mashed rice and buttermilk. This act of devotion transformed her grief into divine service, earning her the title of a “divinely crazy” devotee.

Karmabai is mentioned in a Sikh text, called the Prem Ambodh, which was originally written in 1693 and texts claims that Karmabai met with Mirabai in Udaipur.

A temple dedicated to her, known as Karmabai Ka Mandir, stands in Jagannath Puri, and her khichdi is still offered as bhog to Jagannath. During the annual Jagannath Rath Yatra, the chariot of Jagannath reportedly pauses near her samadhi, a tradition attributed to the belief that the chariot will not move without her divine presence.

Her story has been immortalised in music, with a 1989 Rajasthani album titled Karmabai by Jugalkishore Tilak Raj, featuring songs like Jimo Jimo Mhara Madan Gopal, and a Hindi album of the same name with contributions from artists like Anuradha Paudwal. A college in Jodhpur, Karma Bai Mahavidyalaya, is named in her honour.
