= Zapieka =

- Village
- Location within Poland
- Coordinates: 53°32′N 20°7′E
- Country: Poland
- Voivodeship: Warmian-Masurian
- County: Ostróda
- Gmina: Grunwald
- Population: 130

Zapieka [zaˈpjɛka] (German: Kaulbruch) is a village in the administrative district of Gmina Grunwald, within Ostróda County, Warmian-Masurian Voivodeship, in northern Poland.
