= Gierzwałd =

- Village
- Location within Poland
- Coordinates: 53°33′N 20°5′E
- Country: Poland
- Voivodeship: Warmian-Masurian
- County: Ostróda
- Gmina: Grunwald
- Population: 638

Gierzwałd [ˈɡʲɛʐvau̯t] (German: Geierswalde) is a village in Ostróda County, Warmian-Masurian Voivodeship, in northern Poland. It is the seat of the gmina (administrative district) called Gmina Grunwald.
