= Ulnowo, Ostróda County =

Ulnowo
- Village
- Location within Poland
- Coordinates: 53°28′N 20°10′E
- Country: Poland
- Voivodeship: Warmian-Masurian
- County: Ostróda
- Gmina: Grunwald
- Population: 100

Ulnowo [ulˈnɔvɔ] is a village in the administrative district of Gmina Grunwald, within Ostróda County, Warmian-Masurian Voivodeship, in northern Poland.
