= Rychnowo, Warmian-Masurian Voivodeship =

Rychnowo
- Village
- Location within Poland
- Coordinates: 53°35′9″N 20°5′12″E
- Country: Poland
- Voivodeship: Warmian-Masurian
- County: Ostróda
- Gmina: Grunwald
- Population: 430

Rychnowo [rɨxˈnɔvɔ] is a village in the administrative district of Gmina Grunwald, within Ostróda County, Warmian-Masurian Voivodeship, in northern Poland.
