= Royal Casket =

Polish reliquary, missing since 1939

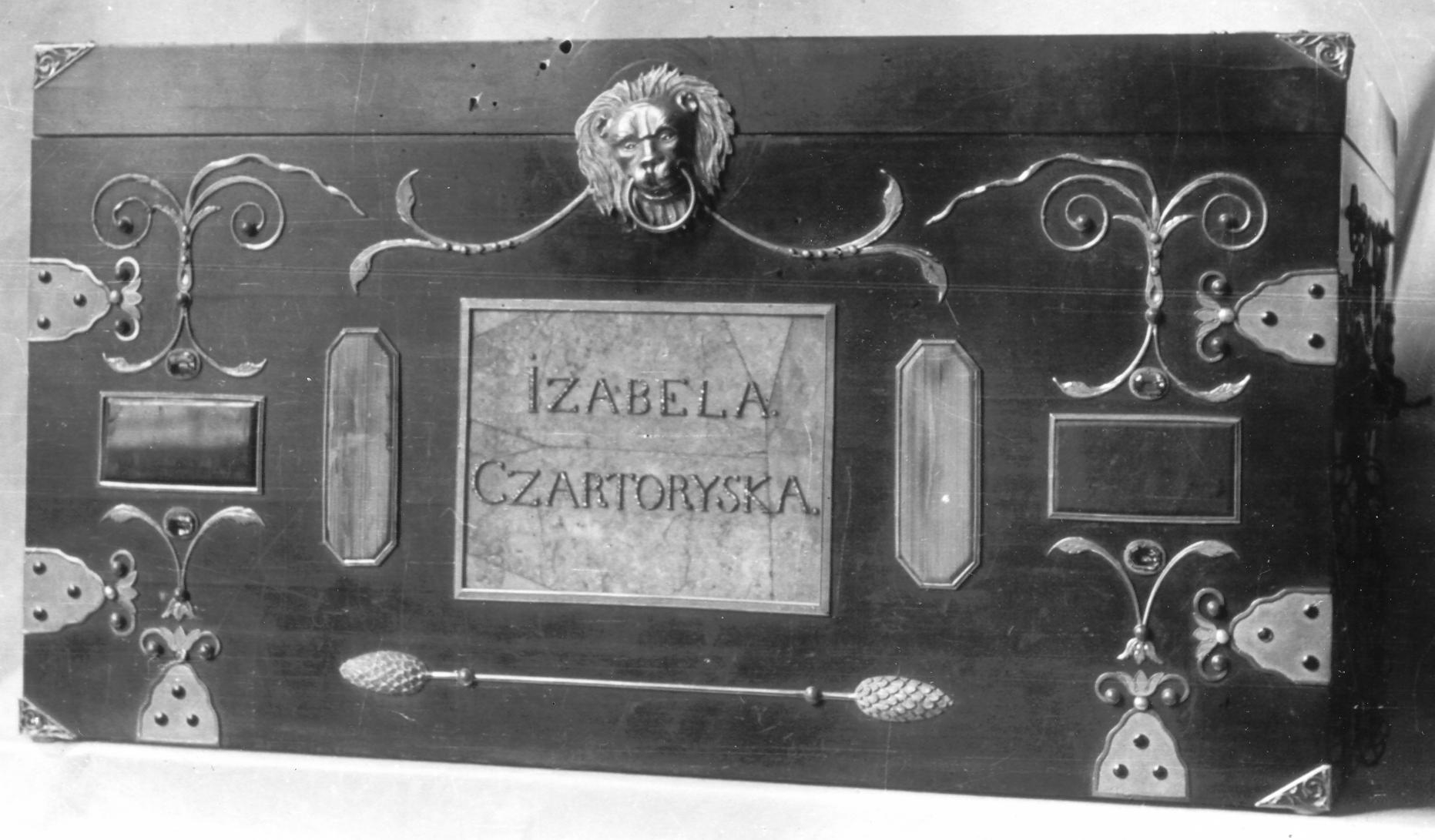
The Royal Casket

The Royal Casket (Polish: Szkatuła Królewska) was a memorial created in 1800 by Izabela Czartoryska. The large wooden casket contained 73 precious relics that had once belonged to Polish royalty. The casket was inscribed: "Polish mementos assembled in 1800 by Izabela Czartoryska". It once reposed in the Temple of the Sibyl at Puławy.

== Contents ==
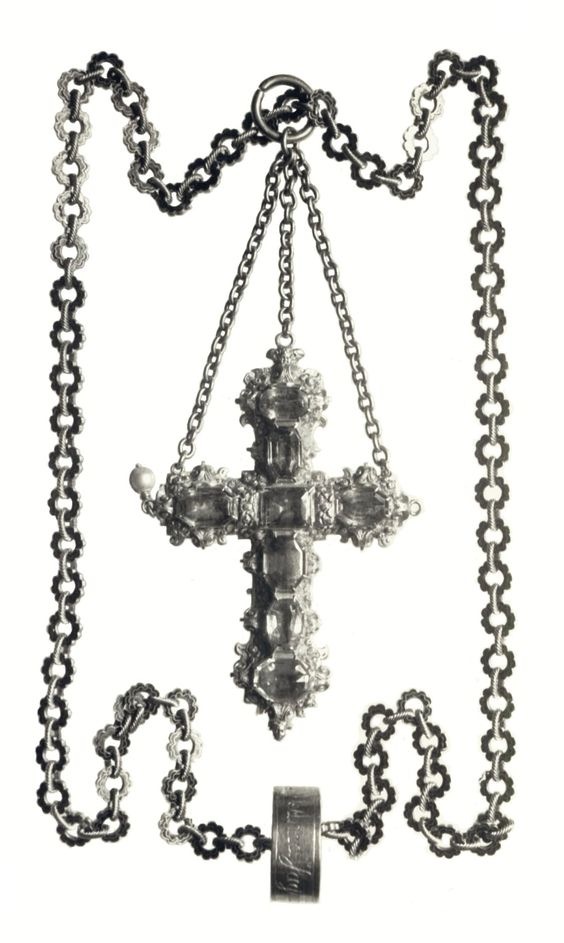
Cross on Anna Jagiellon's chain (see the King/Queen's portrait by Marcin Kober) {below}

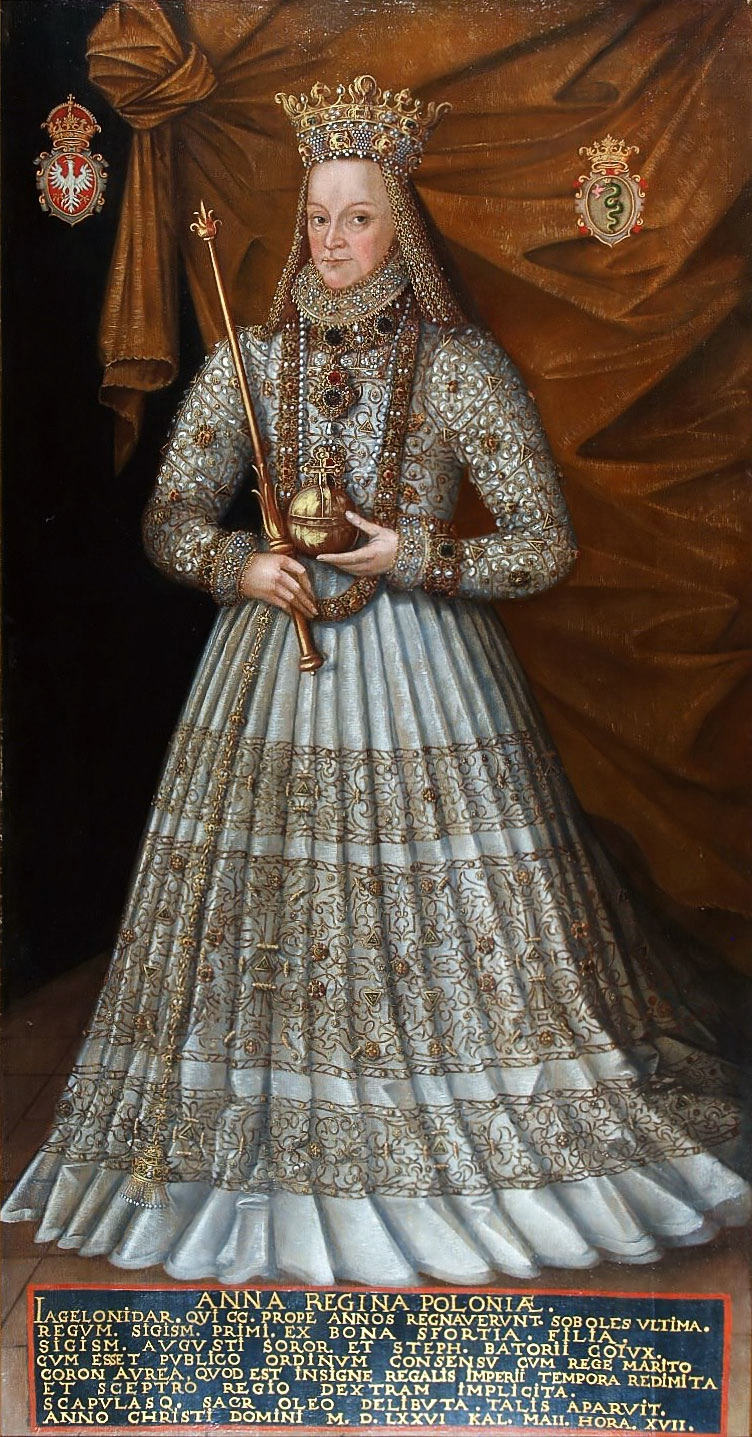
Anna Jagiellon portrait by Marcin Kober

The relics contained in the casket included:

- Portrait of Queen Constance of Austria in a silver dress made by King Sigismund III Vasa
- Silver rosary of Queen Marie Leszczyńska
- Ivory box in a silver gilded frame of King John III Sobieski
- Gold watch of Queen Marie Casimire
- Gold snuff-box decorated with diamonds and an enamel miniature of King Stanisław August Poniatowski
- Gold watch of King Augustus II
- Gold enameled chain of King John II Casimir
- Pectoral cross of King Sigismund the Old, made of red jasper in a gold frame with a gold chain
- Silver filigree cutlery of Prince Zygmunt Kazimierz
- Crystal watch in a gold frame of King Sigismund III Vasa
- Gold watch of King Stanisław Leszczyński
- Gold enameled pendant with "A" monogram and a gold chain of Anna Jagiellon
- Gold filigree chain of Queen Ludwika Maria Gonzaga, etc.

The casket survived all the confiscations after the collapses of the Polish national uprisings, because it had been moved to Kraków.

When World War II broke out, it was transported together with the rich collection of the Czartoryski Museum to Sieniawa and hidden in a repository, in a palace outbuilding, which was later bricked up. However, the German owner of a mill who worked for the Czartoryski family betrayed the hiding place to Wehrmacht soldiers, who entered Sieniawa on 14 September 1939. The soldiers broke into the palace and plundered the collection. They robbed the Royal Casket and distributed its contents among themselves.

== Images ==
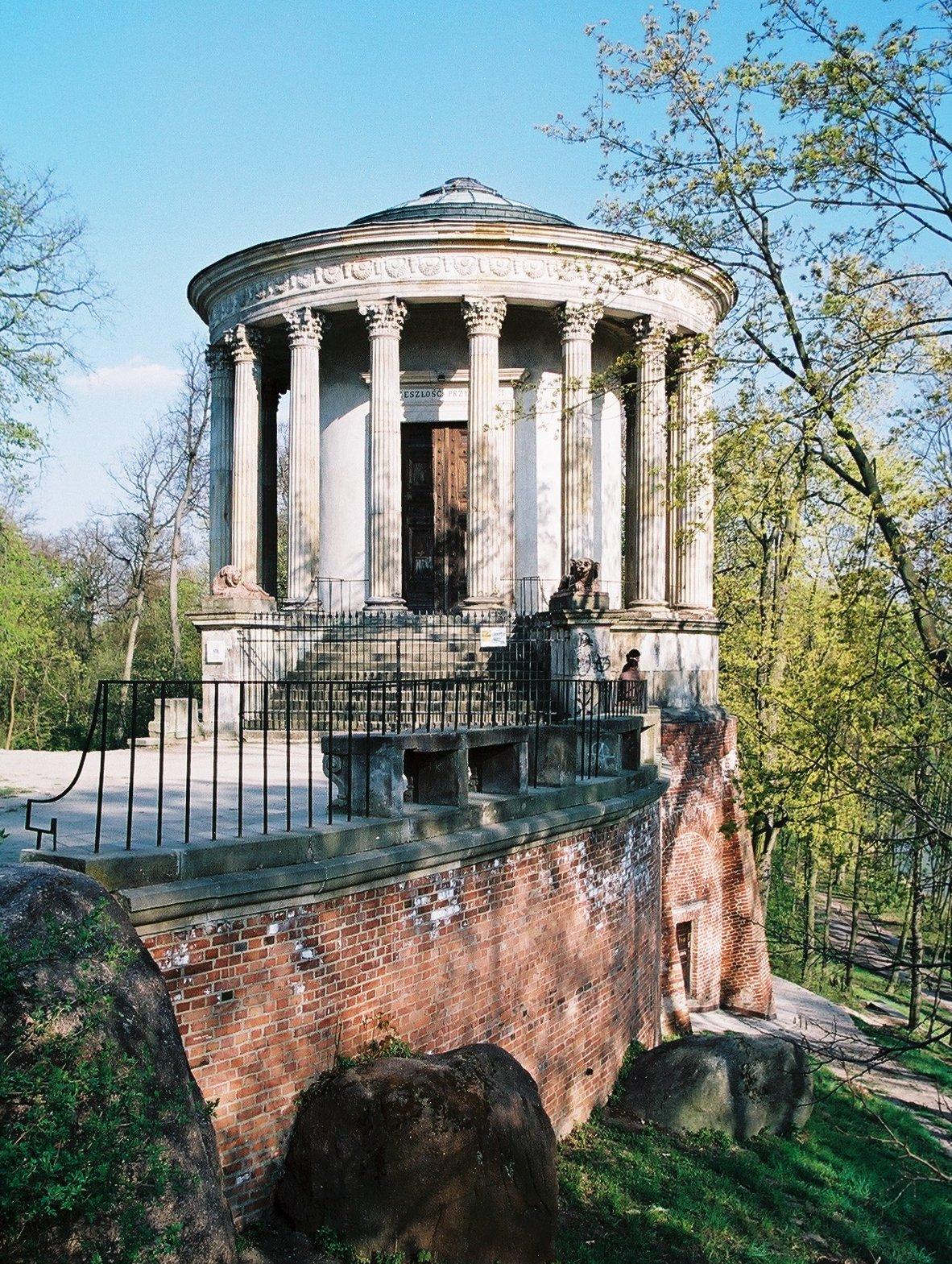
Temple of the Sibyl at Puławy

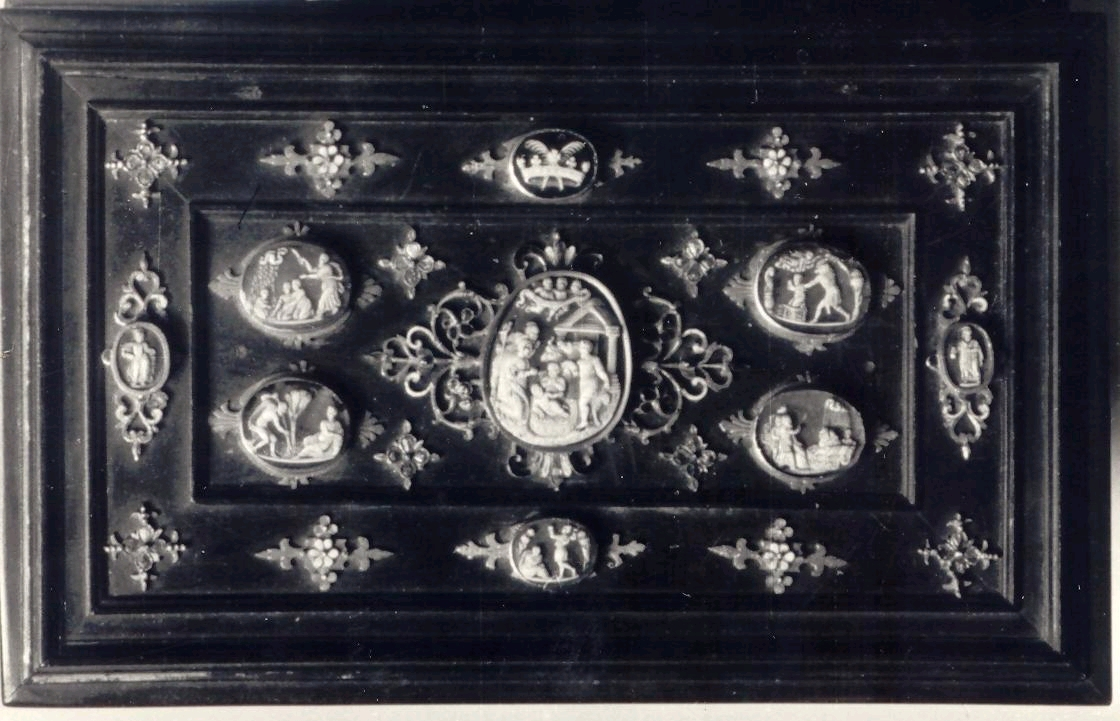
Queen Bona Sforza's casket

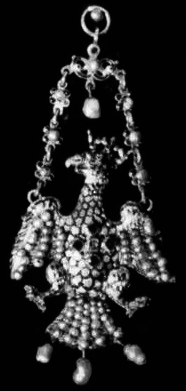
Pendant: Polish Eagle on a chain

== See also ==
- Polish Crown Jewels
- Czartoryski Museum
- Polish culture during World War II
- Nazi plunder
