= Omen (disambiguation) =

An omen is a phenomenon that is believed to foretell the future.

Omen(s) or The Omen may also refer to:

== Fictional characters ==
- Omen (comics), or Lilith Clay, a DC Comics superheroine
- Omen (Dark Oracle), from the TV series Dark Oracle
- Omen, a member of The Legion of Night from Marvel Comics
- The Omen, a recurring antagonist in season 5 of Samurai Jack

== Film and television ==
- The Omen (franchise), a horror film franchise
  - The Omen, a 1976 film directed by Richard Donner starring Gregory Peck and Lee Remick
  - The Omen (2006 film), a 2006 film directed by John Moore, starring Julia Stiles and Liev Schreiber
- Omen (2003 film), a Thai suspense film
- Omen (2023 film), a Belgian drama film
- "Omen" (Soupy Norman), a 2007 television episode

== Literature ==
- The Omen, an 1825 novel by John Galt
- "The Omen", a 1958 short story by Shirley Jackson
- The Omen, a novelization of the 1976 film by David Seltzer
- The Omen, a 1998 five-issue comic book series by Chaos! Comics
- Omen (Star Wars novel), a 2009 Fate of the Jedi novel by Christie Golden
- Omens, a 2013 Cainsville novel by Kelley Armstrong

== Music ==
=== Performers ===
- Omen (band), an American heavy metal band
- Omen (musician) (born 1982), American rapper and producer
- Omen (record producer) (born 1976), American producer and musician
- Thomas "The Omen" Stauch (born 1970), German drummer

=== Albums ===
- Omen (Antestor album), 2012
- Omen (Blutengel album), 2015
- Omen (Soulfly album), 2010
- Omen (The Story Continues...), by Magic Affair, 1994
- Omen (EP), by Within the Ruins, 2011
- An Omen EP, by How to Destroy Angels, 2012
- Omen - The Story, by Mysterious Art, or the title song, 1989
- Omens (3OH!3 album) or the title song, 2013
- Omens (Sorrowful Angels album) or the title song, 2012
- Omens (Lamb of God album), or the title song, 2022

=== Songs ===
- "Omen" (Disclosure song), 2015
- "Omen" (Orbital song), 1990
- "Omen" (The Prodigy song), 2009
- "Omen", by Kim Petras from Turn Off the Light, Vol. 1, 2018
- "The Omen", by Heaven Shall Burn from Invictus (Iconoclast III), 2010

== Places ==
- Omen, Texas, US
- Merkaz Omen, or Omen, a settlement in Israel

== Other uses ==
- Omen (ancient Rome), a sign intimating the future
- HP Omen, a line of gaming computer by HP

== See also ==
- Oman (disambiguation)
