= Kalwa, Rajasthan =

Kalwa Kalwa
- Town
- Location in Rajasthan, India Kalwa (India)
- Coordinates: 25.156278°N 73.841386°E
- Country: India
- State: Rajasthan
- District: nagaur

Languages
  - Official: Hindi
- Time zone: UTC+5:30 (IST)
- 341502: 341502
- ISO 3166 code: RJ-IN
- Vehicle registration: RJ-
- Nearest city: Makrana
- Climate: normal (Köppen)

Kalwa is a small village in Nagaur district, Rajasthan, India. It is birth-place of Lord Krishna devotee, Bhakt Shiromani Karma Bai.
