= Łącko, Warmian-Masurian Voivodeship =

Łącko
- Settlement
- Location within Poland
- Coordinates: 53°30′30″N 20°06′27″E
- Country: Poland
- Voivodeship: Warmian-Masurian
- County: Ostróda
- Gmina: Grunwald

Łącko [ˈwɔnt͡skɔ] is a settlement in the administrative district of Gmina Grunwald, within Ostróda County, Warmian-Masurian Voivodeship, in northern Poland.
