= Kalwa, Warmian-Masurian Voivodeship =

Kalwa
- Settlement
- Location within Poland
- Coordinates: 53°34′02″N 20°05′02″E
- Country: Poland
- Voivodeship: Warmian-Masurian
- County: Ostróda
- Gmina: Grunwald

Kalwa [ˈkalva] is a settlement in the administrative district of Gmina Grunwald, within Ostróda County, Warmian-Masurian Voivodeship, in northern Poland.
