= Charles P. Oman =

American economist (born 1948)

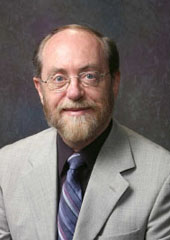
Charles P. Oman

Charles Pennington Oman (born September 30, 1948) is an American economist. From 1978 through 2010, he worked at the OECD Development Centre in Paris, where he was responsible for policy-oriented research programs and then Head of Strategy. Since 2011, he teaches courses on the Political Economy of International Development and on Economics at the Paris School of International Affairs (PSIA) in the Institute of Political Studies ("Sciences Po") in Paris. He has published widely in the areas of international development, the relationship between globalization and regionalization, new forms of international investment and corporate governance.

== Biography ==
Charles Oman was raised in Berkeley, California. He holds a B.A. in Economics (1971) and a PhD in Economics (1978) from the University of California, Berkeley. From 1973 to 1977, he lived in Lima, Peru, where he taught at the Graduate School of Administration (ESAN).

== Publications ==
- Uses and Abuses of Governance Indicators, together with Christiane Arndt, OECD Development Centre 2006
- Corporate Governance: A Development Challenge, together with Daniel Blume, Policy Insights No.3
- Corporate Governance in Developing, Transition and Emerging–Market Economies, together with Steven Fries and William Buiter, OECD Development Centre Policy Brief 23
- Corporate Governance in Development: The Experiences of Brazil, Chile, India, and South Africa, Co-edited with Centre for International Private Enterprise, 2004
- Development is Back, edited together with Colm Foy and Jorge Braga de Macedo, OECD Development Centre 2002
- Corporate Governance and National Development, Development Centre Technical Paper No. 180, 2001.
- Policy Competition for Foreign Direct Investment : A study of Competition among Governments to Attract FDI, OECD Development Centre Studies, 2000.
- The Policy Challenges of Globalisation and Regionalisation, Development Centre Policy Brief No. 11, 1996.
- The Postwar Evolution of Development Thinking, MacMillan and Development Centre Study, 1991.
- Investing in Asia by Colm Foy, Charles P. Oman, Douglas H. Brooks, and Douglas H. Brooks, Edited by Charles P. Oman.
