= Gmina Grunwald =

Gmina Grunwald Grunwald Commune
- Gmina
- Coat of arms
- Interactive map of Gmina Grunwald
- Coordinates (Gierzwałd): 53°33′N 20°5′E
- Country: Poland
- Voivodeship: Warmian-Masurian
- County: Ostróda
- Seat: Gierzwałd

Area
  - Total: 179.84 km^{2} (69.44 sq mi)

Population (2006)
  - Total: 5,648
  - Density: 31.41/km^{2} (81.34/sq mi)

Gmina Grunwald is a rural gmina (administrative district) in Ostróda County, Warmian-Masurian Voivodeship, in northern Poland.

Gmina Grunwald is divided into 19 sołectwos. The villages with the largest population are Gierzwałd, which dates back to the 14th century, and Zybułtowo. Gierzwałd is the administrative seat of the gmina. Unusually the gmina is not named after the seat, but takes its name from the smaller village of Grunwald, because of the historical importance of the Battle of Grunwald of 1410.

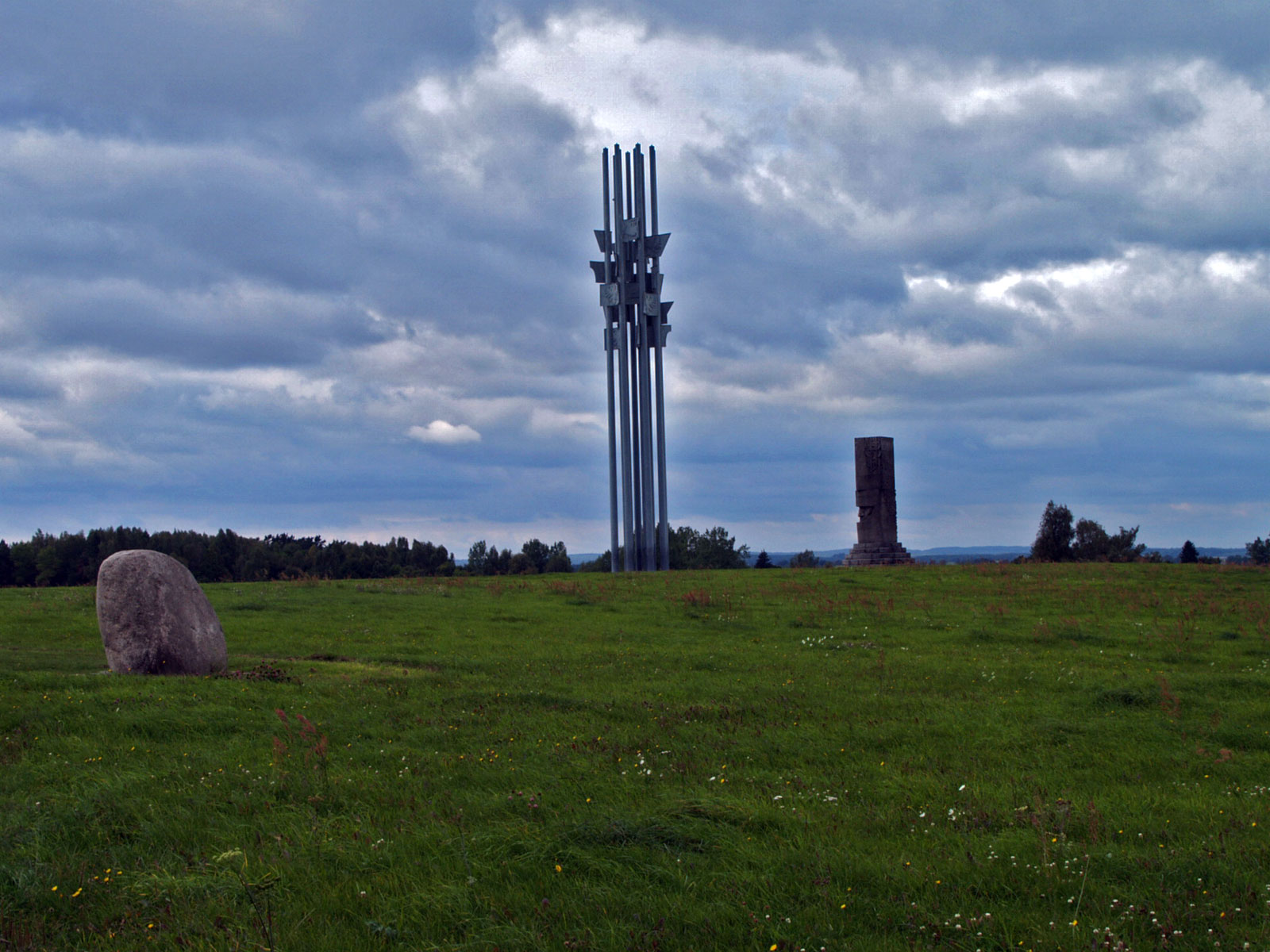

The gmina covers an area of 179.84 square kilometres (69.4 sq mi) (agricultural land 72%, forest 18%), and as of 2006 its total population is 5,648.

== Villages ==
Gmina Grunwald includes the villages and settlements of Dąbrowo, Domkowo, Dylewko, Dylewo, Frygnowo, Gierzwałd, Glądy, Góry Lubiańskie, Grabiczki, Grunwald, Jędrychowo, Kalwa, Kiersztanówko, Kiersztanowo, Kitnowo, Łącko, Lipowa Góra, Łodwigowo, Lubian, Lubianek, Marcinkowo, Mielno, Omin, Pacółtówko, Pacółtowo, Rychnowo, Rychnowska Wola, Rzepki, Stębark, Szczepankowo, Tymawa, Ulnowo, Wróble, Zapieka and Zybułtowo.

== Neighbouring gminas ==
Gmina Grunwald is bordered by the gminas of Dąbrówno, Kozłowo, Olsztynek and Ostróda.

== Historical places of interest ==
- Post-battle chapel in the fields of Grunwald
- Manor house, farm and park in Grunwald
- 14th-century church, cemetery, palace and park in Dylewo
- Methodist church in Gierzwałd
- Church and belfry in Mielno
- Palace in Pacółtów
- Mazurian wooden church, belfry, convent palace park in Rychnowo
- Church in Stębark
- Church in Kiersztanowo
- Granary and barns in Zybułtowo

== Natural features ==
It contains several lakes, the largest of which are Jezioro Tymawskie, Jezioro Lubień, Jezioro Mielno, Jezioro Wielki Omin and Jezioro Mały Omin.

Natural monuments and nature reserves:

- Dylewo Hills Landscape Park (Park Krajobrazowy Wzgórz Dylewskich)
- Devils Valley (Czarci Jar) with the confluences of the Drwęca river
- Trout cultures in Czarci Jarz and Rychnowska Wola
