= New Woman (disambiguation) =

New Woman may refer to:

- New Woman, a feminist ideal emerging in the late 19th century
- "New Woman" (song), by Thai rapper Lisa featuring Spanish singer Rosalía (2024)
- The New Woman, a novel written by the Polish writer Bolesław Prus
- New Woman (magazine), an Indian lifestyle magazine

== See also ==
- New Women, 1935 Chinese silent film
