= Fading Voices =

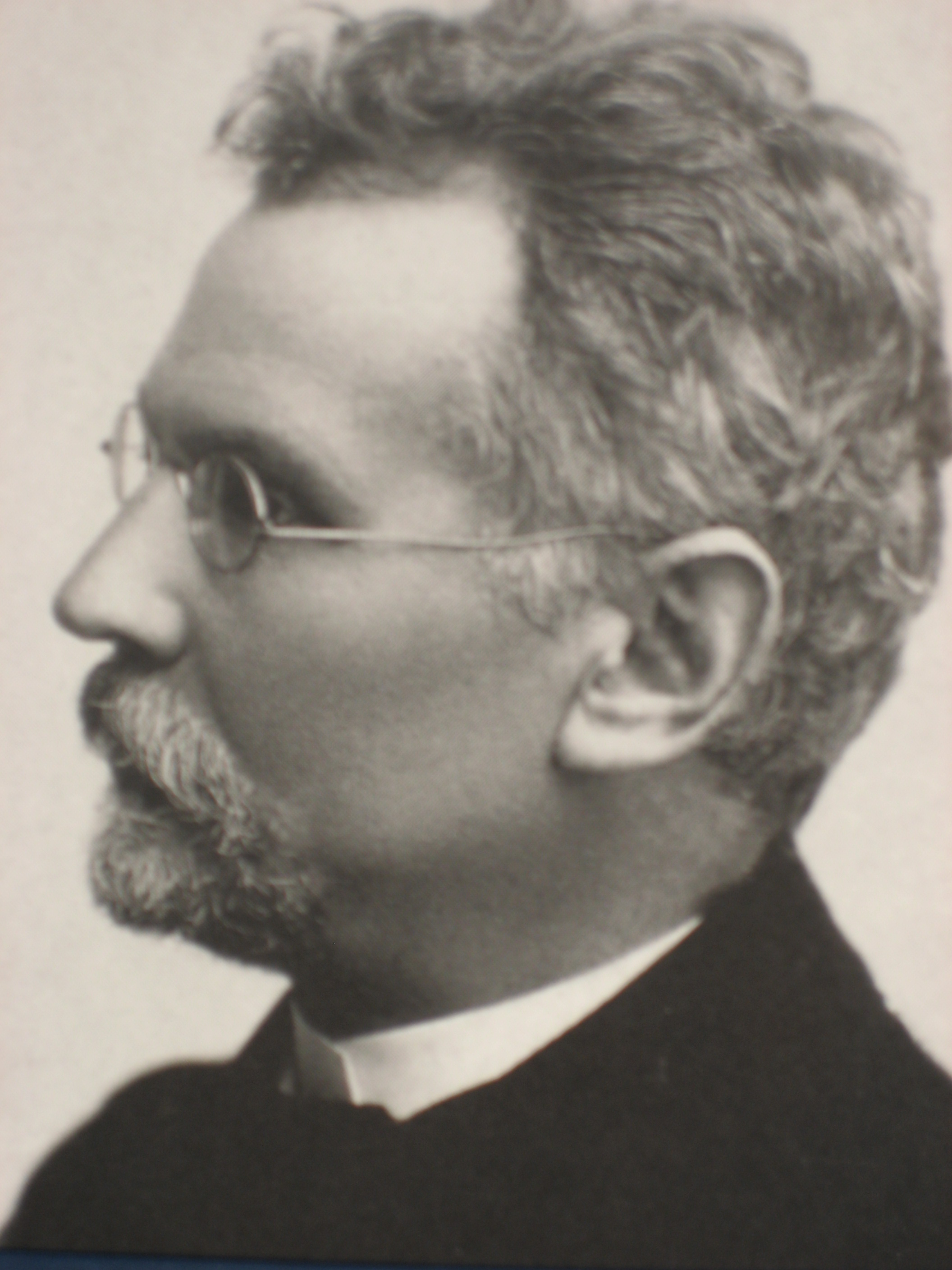
Bolesław Prus

"Fading Voices" (Polish: "Milknące głosy") is an 1883 short story by the Polish writer Bolesław Prus, the leading representative of Realism in 19th-century Polish literature.

== Publication ==
"Fading Voices" was first published, as "Fading Echoes" ("Milknące echa"), in the 1883 New Year's issue (no. 1) of the Warsaw daily Nowiny (News), which was then being edited by Bolesław Prus. (News would fold a year after Prus assumed its editorship.) The story was reprinted in Kraj (The Country), issue 1/2 (21 January 1883).

In December 1885, "Fading Voices" was one of fourteen short stories by Prus to appear in volume I of his Szkice i obrazki (Sketches and Pictures), published by Warszawska Spółka Nakładowa (Warsaw Publishing Company).

In late November 1897, an inexpensive four-volume jubilee edition of Prus' Pisma (Writings) was brought out by Wawelberg and Rotwand. One of the 17 stories included in volume III was "Fading Voices."

"Fading Voices" continues to be reprinted in anthologies of Prus' works and in general Polish anthologies.

== Plot ==
A French Army colonel (a Pole whose name is never given) in late 1871 retires from military service. He is a veteran of "five military campaigns," which may be identified from the names of military commanders and politicians, and of the Battles of Solferino and Gravelotte, mentioned in the story, as likely having been:

- the Polish November 1830 Uprising against Imperial Russia;
- the Hungarian Revolution of 1848 against the Austrian Empire;
- the Franco-Sardinian Campaign against the Austrian Empire (1859);
- the Franco-Prussian War (1870–71); and
- the Paris Commune (1871).

In the last, the Paris Commune campaign, the Colonel would have fought on the side of the Versailles forces, not the Communards (and thus against other Poles, including the Paris Commune's military chief, Jarosław Dąbrowski).

The Colonel has thus participated in campaigns against each of the three imperial powers—Russia, Austria and Prussia—that, acting in concert, had in the 18th century wiped his country, the Polish–Lithuanian Commonwealth, from the political map of Europe. (Poland will be restored to independence only with those empires' collapse in World War I, in 1918—six years after Prus' death in 1912.)

On his retirement, the Colonel decides to return to his homeland, to Russian-occupied Poland. His departure is delayed by the arrival in Lyon of three of his Polish compatriots and comrades-in-arms from, apparently, the 1830–31 Uprising. But eventually all three die and at last the Colonel, having sold his house and garden, departs for Warsaw.

The Colonel is shocked by the changes that have taken place in his native land since his youth. He hardly recognizes the streets of Warsaw, now built up with unattractive tenements; he finds no common language with the people in his social circles, who are absorbed by material concerns and a superficial social life; the very natural landscape of his native country appears, to the Colonel, unrecognizably altered. Disillusioned by the contrast between the country that he had remembered from his youth and the country that meets his gaze, the Colonel contemplates returning to France.

Just as he is pondering whether to leave for France that day or the next day, the Colonel's mind is unexpectedly changed by a chance encounter with an impoverished shoemaker who wishes to show the Colonel to his little son, whom he wants in the future to emulate the military hero of Poland, Hungary and France. The Colonel finds himself at a loss for words; the two men barely exchange glances, but the brief encounter with this rough member of Polish society suffices to change the Colonel's mind. His old vision of his native land is restored, and he decides to stay in Warsaw after all.

== Themes ==
In his never-to-be-finished 1885 novel Sława (Fame), Prus excoriates his countrymen:

"You are backward, and what is worse: sunk in mental lethargy. The great ideas of civilization, if they ever existed in you, have perished, leaving behind shells and scraps... All around you has moved ahead, West and East. In the world's soil there have grown up and matured new ideas, scientific, philosophical, artistic and social, there have arisen new questions and new heroes. You know nothing of this; when something reaches you like contraband, you receive it with mockery or anger and, to occupy your sterile minds with something, you retreat into dreams of the Middle Ages."

Fame's hero, Julian, will characterize Warsaw's upper classes succinctly: "[T]he ladies are dolls, the parlors—mortuaries, and all the intelligentsia—putrefaction."

This, observes Zygmunt Szweykowski, is close to the atmosphere that will imbue Prus' later novel, The Doll (written and published in newspaper serialization in 1887–89). There appears here a motif that will loom large in Prus' subsequent works: flight from this decaying society. Julian flees it; the old Colonel in "Fading Voices" contemplates fleeing it.

Prus, disappointed with the upper reaches of Polish society, seeks recompense elsewhere, and discovers it in the past and in the common people. He finds within himself an affinity for the recent past—a past that is condemned by contemporary Polish Positivist doctrine—the Romanticism whose human representatives are gradually dying off. "Full of elegiac, soft tones," writes Szweykowski, "are [the story's] 'fading voices' which bring echoes of heroic feats of arms, of self-sacrifice for the idea of "For your freedom and ours," and of a fervent, noble faith in the regeneration of mankind." Prus senses a kindred idealism in the common people, and portrays it in his stories, "On Vacation" ("Na wakacjach," 1884), "An Old Tale" ("Stara bajka," 1884) and here in "Fading Voices" (1883).

On 1 September 1863, Prus, then a 16-year-old volunteer in the Polish 1863–65 Uprising against Imperial Russia, had been captured during a battle at the village of Białka, four kilometers south of Siedlce. Thus "Fading Voices" resonates for Prus at a deeply emotional level: not only had the youngster suffered serious physical traumata and probably the beginnings of his lifelong agoraphobia, and subsequently also imprisonment at Lublin, but after the Uprising he had found himself ostracized by many of his compatriots, whom he had sought to restore to national independence.

"Fading Voices" thus combines two of Prus' interests during this period: the common people, and the legacy of the Romantic past—the past out of which Prus had himself grown, as a teenaged participant in the 1863–65 Uprising.

== See also ==
- Positivism in Poland

== Sources ==
- Krystyna Tokarzówna and Stanisław Fita, Bolesław Prus, 1847–1912: Kalendarz życia i twórczości (Bolesław Prus, 1847–1912: A Calendar of His Life and Work), edited by Zygmunt Szweykowski, Warsaw, Państwowy Instytut Wydawniczy, 1969.
- Marian Płachecki, notes to Bolesław Prus, Nowele wybrane (Selected Short Stories), Warsaw, Państwowy Instytut Wydawniczy, 1976, ISBN 83-06-00010-2.
- Zygmunt Szweykowski, Twórczość Bolesława Prusa (The Art of Bolesław Prus), 2nd ed., Warsaw, Państwowy Instytut Wydawniczy, 1972
