= The Outpost (Prus novel) =

Novel by Bolesław Prus

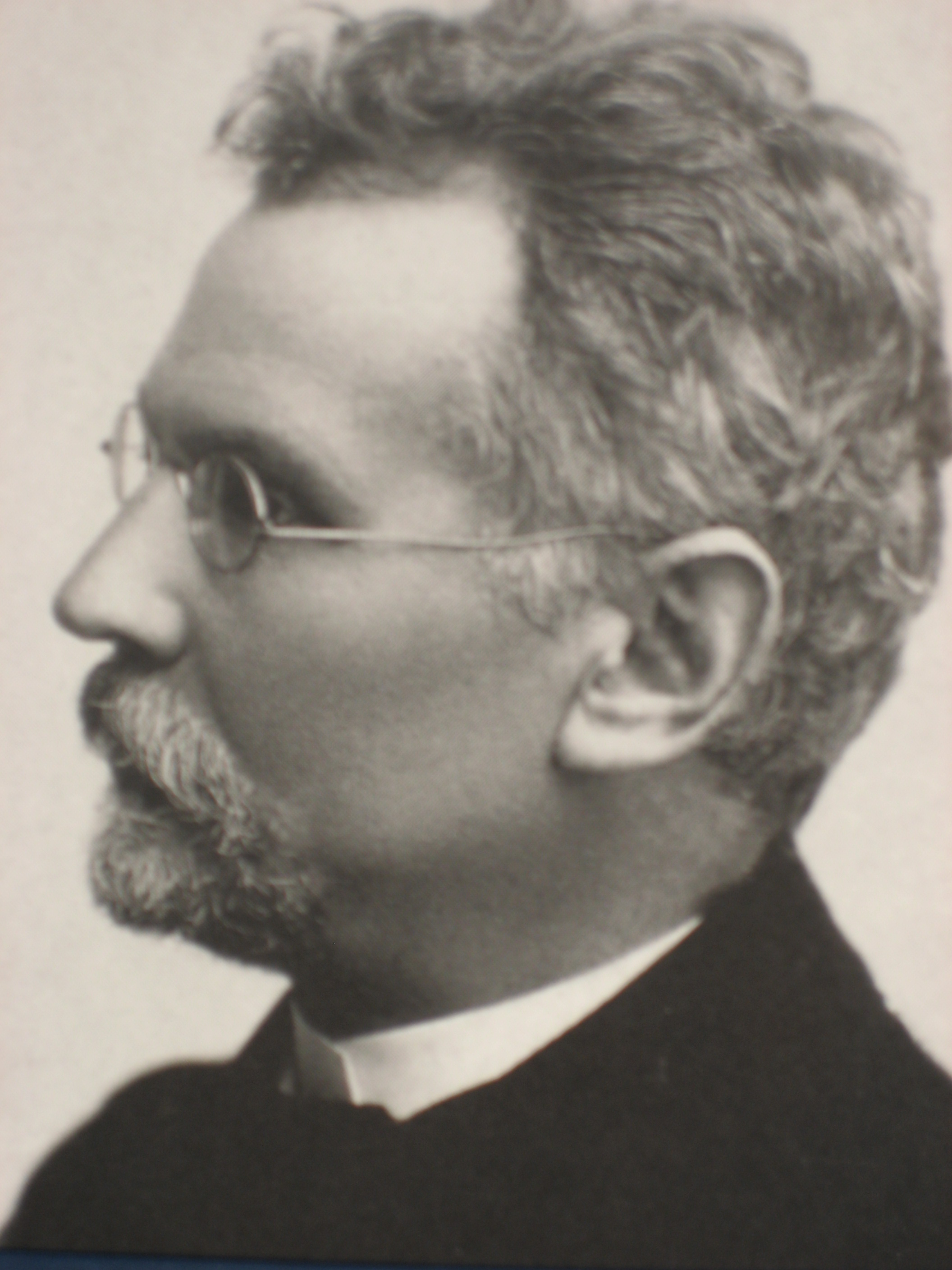
- Author: Bolesław Prus
- Original title: Placówka
- Language: Polish
- Publisher: Gebethner i Wolff, Warsaw
- Original text: Placówka at Polish Wikisource

The Outpost (Polish title: Placówka) was the first of four major novels by the Polish writer Bolesław Prus. The author, writing in a Poland that had been partitioned a century earlier by Russia, Prussia and Austria, sought to bring attention to the plight of rural Poland, which had to contend with poverty, ignorance, neglect by the country's upper crust, and colonization by German settlers backed by Otto von Bismarck's German government.

== Composition ==
Prus began writing The Outpost as early as 1880, initially titling it Nasza placówka (Our Outpost), but soon suspended work on it in favor of close observation of rural life, chiefly around Nałęczów, where he vacationed for 30 years from 1882 until his death. He resumed work on the novel in 1884. Written in installments, The Outpost was serialized in the illustrated weekly, Wędrowiec (The Wanderer) between March 19, 1885, and May 20, 1886. The first book edition appeared in 1886.

== Plot ==
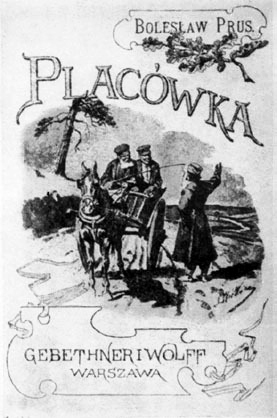
Cover of book edition of The Outpost

The Outpost is a study of rural Poland under the country's foreign partitions. Its principal character, a peasant surnamed Ślimak ("Snail", in Polish), typifies his village's inhabitants, nearly all illiterate; there is no school under Russian imperial rule. Religion is naively superficial: when a villager, Orzechowski, buys an engraving of Leda and the Swan for a mere three roubles at the landowner's moving-out sale, he prays before it with his family, much as other villagers venerate old portraits of noblemen who had been benefactors of the local church.

Changes are, however, coming to the area. A railway line is being built nearby. The owners of a local manor house sell their estate to German settlers . Polish landowners, who speak more French than Polish, are happy to take the money and move to a city or abroad, away from the boring countryside. Ślimak's farm becomes an isolated Polish outpost in an increasingly German-settled neighborhood.

Ślimak suffers a series of adversities as he refuses to sell his plot of land to German settlers (who are described not unsympathetically). The stubborn, conservative peasant is not acting from self-interest, since the money he would have gotten could have bought a better farm elsewhere; he is, rather, acting from inertia and from a principle inculcated in him by his father and grandfather: that when a peasant loses his hereditary plot, he faces the greatest of misfortunes—becoming a mere wage-earner.

Still, Ślimak lacks his wife's strength of will; he hesitates. But on her deathbed she makes him swear that he will never sell their land.

The book's somber picture is relieved by the author's humour and warmth. The local Catholic priest, habitué of dinners and hunting parties at local manors, is not entirely devoid of Christian virtues. Two of the village's humbler denizens turn out to be exemplars of selflessness. Ślimak's half-wit farm hand, on finding an abandoned baby, takes it home to care for it. After Mrs. Ślimak dies and the widower's farm burns down, he is befriended by a poor, empathetic Jewish peddler who comes to his aid and, in the manner of a deus ex machina, saves the day and the farm.

== Influences ==
The Outpost (1886), according to critics, is not Bolesław Prus' highest achievement as a novelist. It does not show the full psychological depth of his other novels such as The Doll (1889) or the conceptual sweep of Pharaoh (1895). The Outpost's "happy ending" has a somewhat contrived quality. Still, the book is a respectable achievement in the European tradition of the realistic novel. Despite Prus' reservations about Émile Zola's naturalism, the Polish writer took some inspirations from the French novelist. Prus' Outpost (1885–86) in turn influenced the Polish Nobel Prize in Literature-winning novelist Władysław Reymont's treatment, two decades later, of rural life in The Peasants (1904–1909).

In 1979, The Outpost was produced as a Polish feature film (Placówka) directed by Zygmunt Skonieczny.

== See also ==
- "Mold of the Earth" (an 1884 thematically-related micro-story by Bolesław Prus).
- Social novel

== Sources ==
- Miłosz, Czesław (1969). The History of Polish Literature. New York: Macmillan. pp. 294–295. ISBN 978-0-02-585010-1.
- Szweykowski, Zygmunt (1972). Twórczość Bolesława Prusa [The Art of Bolesław Prus] (2nd ed.). Warsaw: Państwowy Instytut Wydawniczy. pp. 130–151.
- Jakubowski, Jan Zygmunt, ed. (1979). Literatura polska od średniowiecza do pozytywizmu [Polish Literature from the Middle Ages to Positivism]. Warsaw: Państwowe Wydawnictwo Naukowe. p. 624.
