= Bolesław Prus =

Polish novelist (1847–1912)

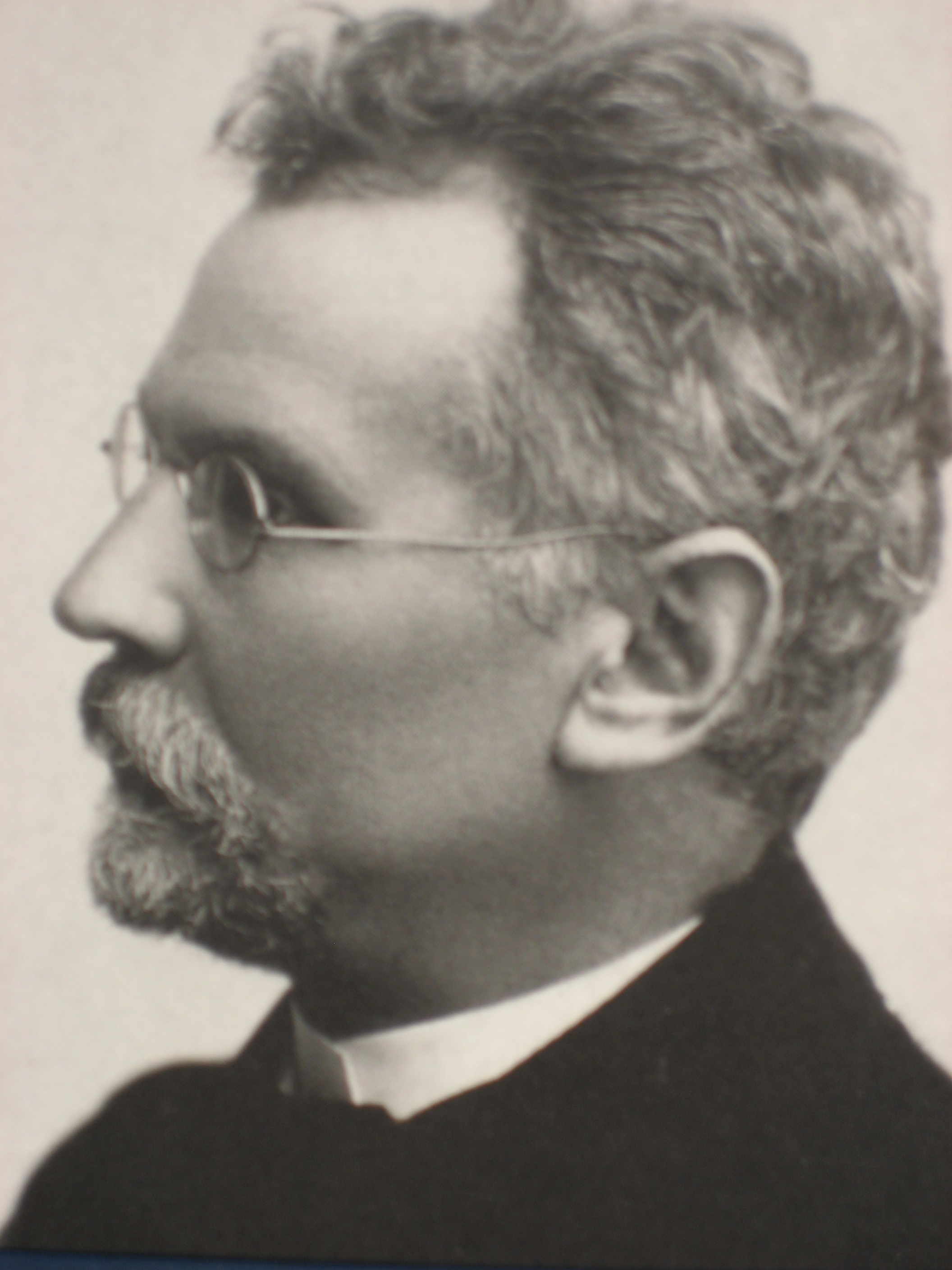
- Born: Aleksander Głowacki; 20 August 1847; Hrubieszów, Congress Poland
- Died: 19 May 1912 (aged 64); Warsaw, Congress Poland
- Occupations: Novelist, journalist, short-story writer
- Spouse(s): Oktawia Głowacka, née Trembińska
- Children: Emil Trembiński (adopted)
- Writing career
- Pen name: Bolesław Prus
- Period: 1872–1912
- Genres: Realist novel; Historical novel; Short story; Micro-story; Prose poetry
- Movement: Positivism

Aleksander Głowacki (20 August 1847 – 19 May 1912), better known by his pen name Bolesław Prus (Polish: [bɔˈlεswaf ˈprus]), was a Polish journalist, novelist, a leading figure in the history of Polish literature and philosophy, and a distinctive voice in world literature.

Aged 15, Aleksander Głowacki joined the Polish 1863 Uprising against Imperial Russia. Shortly after his 16th birthday, he suffered severe battle injuries. Five months later, he was imprisoned. These early experiences may have precipitated the panic disorder and agoraphobia that dogged him through life, and shaped his opposition to seeking Poland's independence by force of arms.

In 1872, in Warsaw, aged 25, he settled into a 40-year journalistic career that focused on science, technology, education, and economic and cultural development – societal enterprises essential to the perseverance of a people who in the 18th century had been partitioned out of political existence by Russia, Prussia, and Austria. Głowacki took the pen name for his popular writings, "Prus", from the appellation of his family's coat-of-arms.

As a sideline, he wrote short stories. Achieving success, he proceeded to a larger canvas: between 1884 and 1895, he completed four major novels: The Outpost, The Doll, The New Woman, and Pharaoh. The Doll depicts the romantic infatuation of a man of action who is frustrated by his country's backwardness. Pharaoh, his only historical novel, is a study of politics, set in ancient Egypt at the fall of its 20th Dynasty and New Kingdom.

== Life ==
=== Early years ===
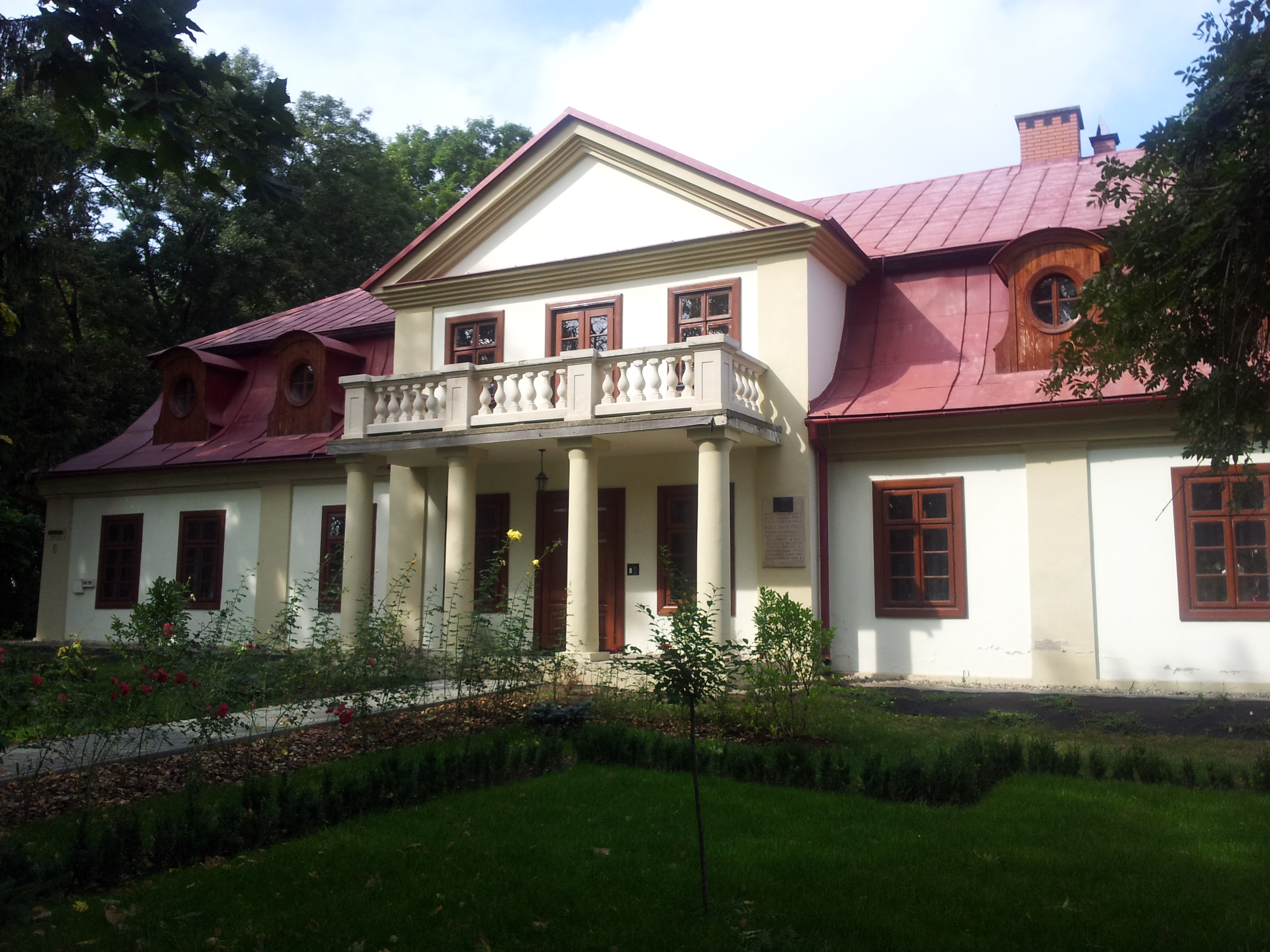
Prus' Hrubieszów birthplace

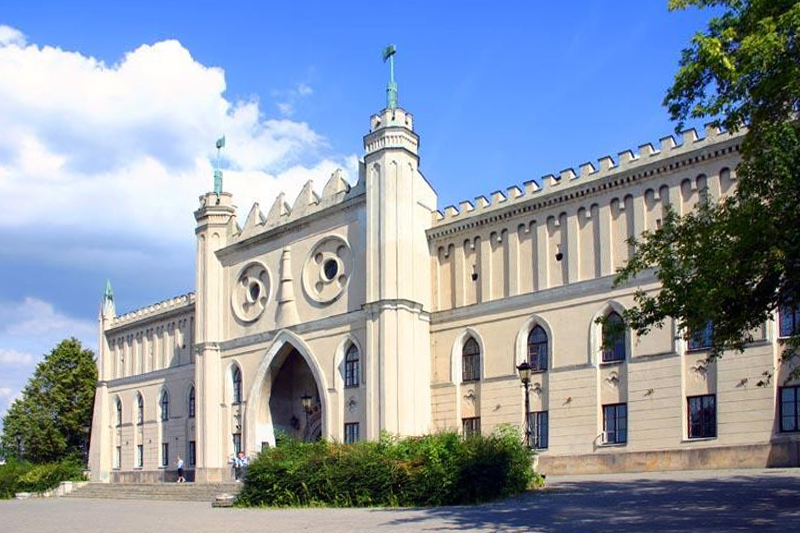
Lublin Castle, Prus' prison during 1863–65 Uprising

Aleksander Głowacki was born 20 August 1847 in Hrubieszów, now in southeastern Poland, very near the present-day border with Ukraine. The town was then in the Russian-controlled sector of partitioned Poland, known as the "Congress Kingdom". Aleksander was the younger son of Antoni Głowacki, an estate steward at the village of Żabcze, in Hrubieszów County, and Apolonia Głowacka (née Trembińska).

In 1850, when the future Bolesław Prus was three years old, his mother died; the child was placed in the care of his maternal grandmother, Marcjanna Trembińska of Puławy, and, four years later, in the care of his aunt, Domicela Olszewska of Lublin. In 1856 Prus was orphaned by his father's death and, aged 9, began attending a Lublin primary school whose principal, Józef Skłodowski, grandfather of the future double Nobel laureate Maria Skłodowska-Curie, administered canings (a customary mode of disciplining) to wayward pupils, including the spirited Aleksander.

In 1862, Prus's brother, Leon, a teacher thirteen years his senior, took him to Siedlce, then to Kielce.

Soon after the outbreak of the Polish January 1863 Uprising against Imperial Russia, 15-year-old Prus ran away from school to join the insurgents. He may have been influenced by his brother Leon, one of the Uprising's leaders. Leon, during a June 1863 mission to Wilno (now Vilnius) in Lithuania for the Polish insurgent government, developed a debilitating mental illness that would end only with his death in 1907.

On 1 September 1863, twelve days after his sixteenth birthday, Prus took part in a battle against Russian forces at a village called Białka, four kilometers south of Siedlce. He suffered contusions to the neck and gunpowder injuries to his eyes, and was captured unconscious on the battlefield and taken to hospital in Siedlce. This experience may have caused his subsequent lifelong agoraphobia.

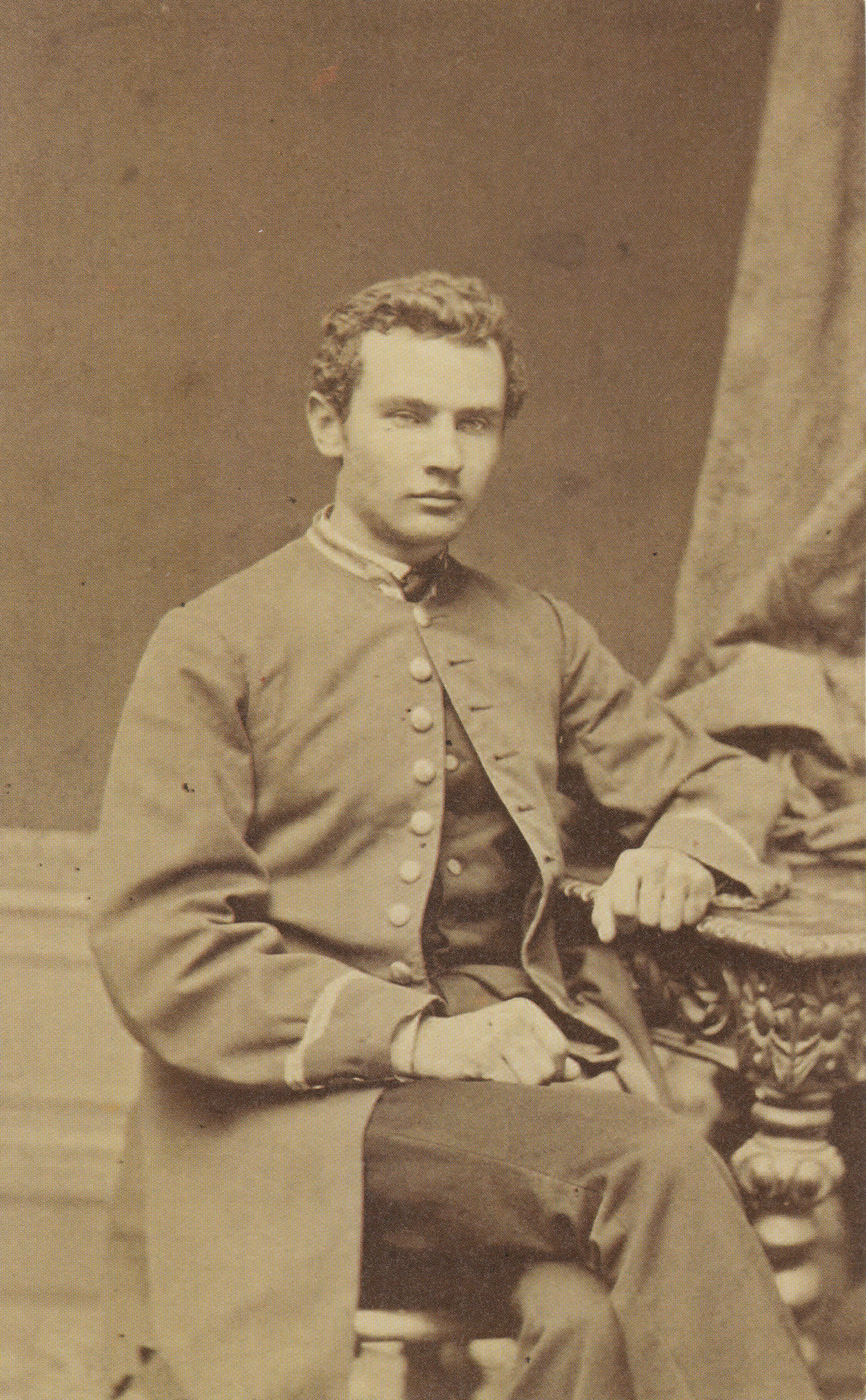
Prus as a Warsaw University student

Five months later, in early February 1864, Prus was arrested and imprisoned at Lublin Castle for his role in the Uprising. In early April a military court sentenced him to forfeiture of his nobleman's status and resettlement on imperial lands. On 30 April, however, the Lublin District military head credited Prus's time spent under arrest and, on account of the 16-year-old's youth, decided to place him in the custody of his uncle Klemens Olszewski. On 7 May, Prus was released and entered the household of Katarzyna Trembińska, a relative and the mother of his future wife, Oktawia Trembińska.

Prus enrolled at a Lublin gymnasium (secondary school), the still functioning prestigious Stanisław Staszic School, founded in 1586. Graduating on 30 June 1866, at nineteen he matriculated in the Warsaw University Department of Mathematics and Physics. In 1868, poverty forced him to break off his university studies.

In 1869, he enrolled in the Forestry Department at the newly opened Agriculture and Forestry Institute in Puławy, a historic town where he had spent some of his childhood and which, 15 years later, was the setting for his striking 1884 micro-story, "Mold of the Earth", comparing human history with the mutual aggressions of blind, mindless colonies of molds that cover a boulder adjacent to the Temple of the Sibyl. In January 1870, after only three months at the institute, Prus was expelled for his insufficient deference toward the martinet Russian-language instructor.

Henceforth he studied on his own while supporting himself mainly as a tutor. As part of his program of self-education, he translated and summarized John Stuart Mill's A System of Logic.

In 1872, he embarked on a career as a newspaper columnist, while working several months at the Evans, Lilpop and Rau Machine and Agricultural Implement Works in Warsaw. In 1873, Prus delivered two public lectures which illustrate the breadth of his scientific interests: "On the Structure of the Universe", and "On Discoveries and Inventions."

=== Columnist ===
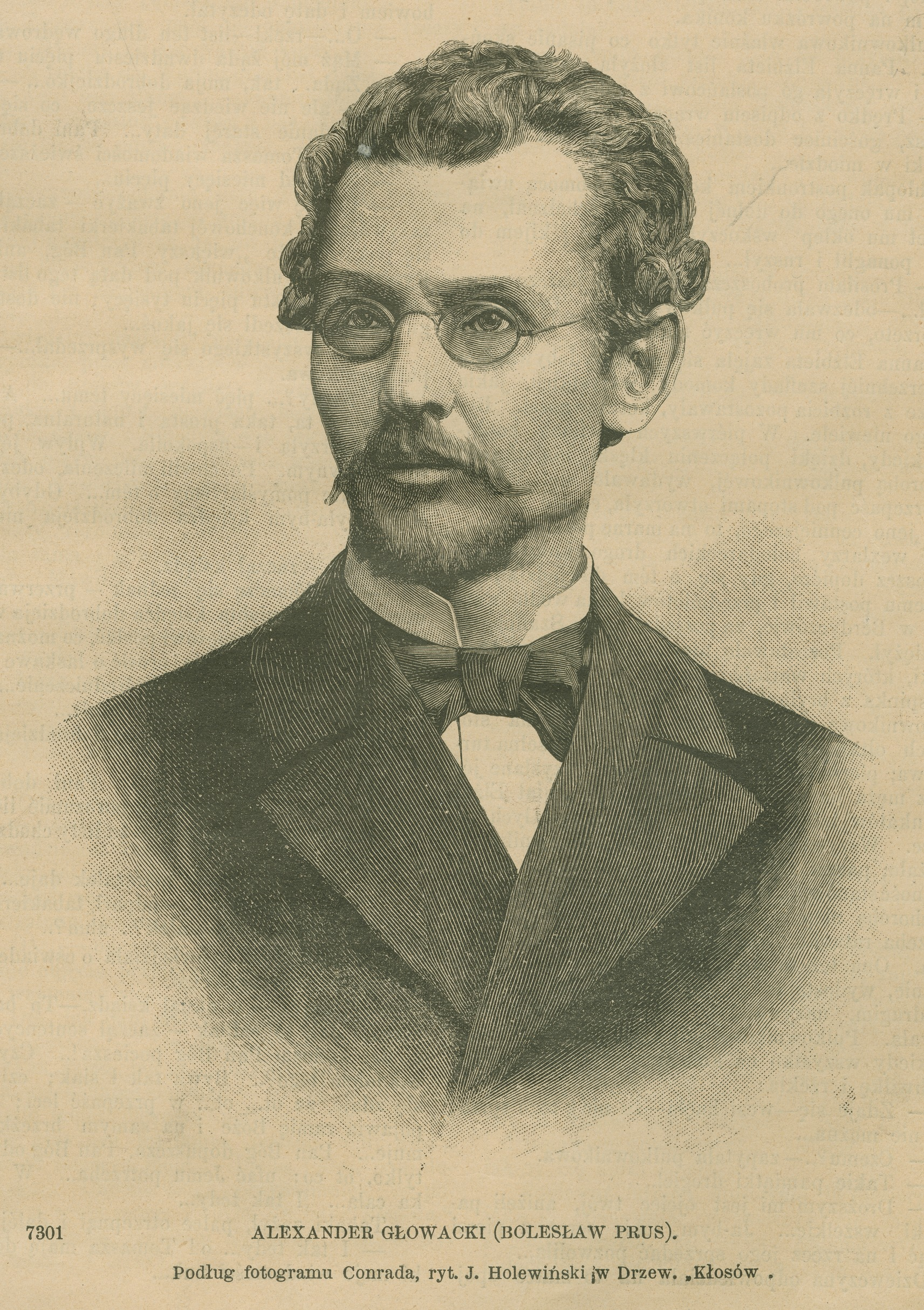
Prus in 1886

As a newspaper columnist, Prus commented on the achievements of scholars and scientists such as John Stuart Mill, Charles Darwin, Alexander Bain, Herbert Spencer and Henry Thomas Buckle; urged Poles to study science and technology and to develop industry and commerce; encouraged the establishment of charitable institutions to benefit the underprivileged; described the fiction and nonfiction works of fellow writers such as H. G. Wells; and extolled man-made and natural wonders such as the Wieliczka Salt Mine, an 1887 solar eclipse that he witnessed at Mława, planned building of the Eiffel Tower for the 1889 Paris Exposition, and Nałęczów, where he vacationed for 30 years.

His "Weekly Chronicles" spanned forty years (they have since been reprinted in twenty volumes) and helped prepare the ground for the 20th-century blossoming of Polish science and especially mathematics. (Note: Prus was not alone in advocating the development of science and technology. It was part of the spirit of the times. The great Polish mathematician Kazimierz Kuratowski writes that in the period when Poland was under complete foreign rule (1795–1918) "It was a common belief that the cultivation of science and the growth of its potential would somehow guarantee the [survival] of the [Polish] nation.") "Our national life," wrote Prus, "will take a normal course only when we have become a useful, indispensable element of civilization, when we have become able to give nothing for free and to demand nothing for free." The social importance of science and technology recurred as a theme in his novels The Doll (1889) and Pharaoh (1895).

Of contemporary thinkers, the one who most influenced Prus and other writers of the Polish "Positivist" period (roughly 1864–1900) was Herbert Spencer, the English sociologist who coined the phrase, "survival of the fittest." Prus called Spencer "the Aristotle of the 19th century" and wrote: "I grew up under the influence of Spencerian evolutionary philosophy and heeded its counsels, not those of Idealist or Comtean philosophy." Prus interpreted "survival of the fittest," in the societal sphere, as involving not only competition but also cooperation; and he adopted Spencer's metaphor of society as organism. He used this metaphor to striking effect in his 1884 micro-story "Mold of the Earth", and in the introduction to his 1895 historical novel, Pharaoh.

After Prus began writing regular weekly newspaper columns, his finances stabilized, permitting him on 14 January 1875 to marry a distant cousin on his mother's side, Oktawia Trembińska. She was the daughter of Katarzyna Trembińska, in whose home he had lived, after release from prison, for two years from 1864 to 1866 while completing secondary school. The couple adopted a boy, Emil Trembiński (born 11 September 1886, the son of Prus's brother-in-law Michał Trembiński, who had died on 10 November 1888). Emil was the model for Rascal in chapter 48 of Prus's 1895 novel, Pharaoh. On 18 February 1904, aged seventeen, Emil fatally shot himself in the chest on the doorstep of an unrequited love.

It has been alleged that in 1906, aged 59, Prus had a son, Jan Bogusz Sacewicz. The boy's mother was Alina Sacewicz, widow of Dr. Kazimierz Sacewicz, a socially conscious physician whom Prus had known at Nałęczów. Dr. Sacewicz may have been the model for Stefan Żeromski's Dr. Judym in the novel, Ludzie bezdomni (Homeless People)—a character resembling Dr. Stockman in Henrik Ibsen's play, An Enemy of the People. Prus, known for his affection for children, took a lively interest in little Jan, as attested by a prolific correspondence with Jan's mother (whom Prus attempted to interest in writing). Jan Sacewicz became one of Prus's major legatees and an engineer, and died in a German camp after the suppression of the Warsaw Uprising of August–October 1944.

Prus coat of arms, which inspired the pen-name "Bolesław Prus"

Though Prus was a gifted writer, initially best known as a humorist, he early on thought little of his journalistic and literary work. Hence at the inception of his career in 1872, at the age of 25, he adopted for his newspaper columns and fiction the pen name "Prus" ("Prus I" was his family coat-of-arms), reserving his actual name, Aleksander Głowacki, for "serious" writing.

An 1878 incident illustrates the strong feelings that can be aroused in susceptible readers of newspaper columns. Prus had criticized the rowdy behavior of some Warsaw university students at a lecture about the poet Wincenty Pol. The students demanded that Prus retract what he had written. He refused, and, on 26 March 1878, several of them surrounded him outside his home, where he had returned shortly before in the company (for his safety) of two fellow writers; one of the students, Jan Sawicki, slapped Prus's face. Police were summoned, but Prus declined to press charges.

Seventeen years later, during his 1895 visit to Paris, Prus's memory of the incident was still so painful that he may have refused (accounts vary) to meet with one of his assailants, Kazimierz Dłuski, and his wife Bronisława Dłuska (Marie Skłodowska Curie's sister who 19 years later, in 1914, scolded Joseph Conrad for writing his novels and stories in English, rather than in Polish for the benefit of Polish culture). These curiously interlinked incidents involving the Dłuskis and the two authors perhaps illustrate the contemporary intensity of aggrieved Polish national pride.

In 1882, on the recommendation of an earlier editor-in-chief, the prophet of Polish Positivism, Aleksander Świętochowski, Prus succeeded to the editorship of the Warsaw daily Nowiny (News). The newspaper had been bought in June 1882 by financier Stanisław Kronenberg. Prus resolved, in the best Positivist fashion, to make it "an observatory of societal facts"—an instrument for advancing the development of his country. After less than a year, however, Nowiny—which had had a history of financial instability since changing in July 1878 from a Sunday paper to a daily—folded, and Prus resumed writing columns. He continued working as a journalist to the end of his life, well after he had achieved success as an author of short stories and novels.

In an 1884 newspaper column, published two decades before the Wright brothers flew, Prus anticipated that powered flight would not bring humanity closer to universal comity: "Are there among flying creatures only doves, and no hawks? Will tomorrow's flying machine obey only the honest and the wise, and not fools and knaves?... The expected societal changes may come down to a new form of chase and combat in which the man who is vanquished on high will fall and smash the skull of the peaceable man down below."

In a January 1909 column, Prus discussed H. G. Wells's 1901 book, Anticipations, including Wells's prediction that by the year 2000, following the defeat of German imperialism "on land and at sea," there would be a European Union that would reach eastward to include the western Slavs—the Poles, Czechs and Slovaks. The latter peoples, along with the Hungarians and six other countries, did in fact join the European Union in 2004.

=== Fiction ===
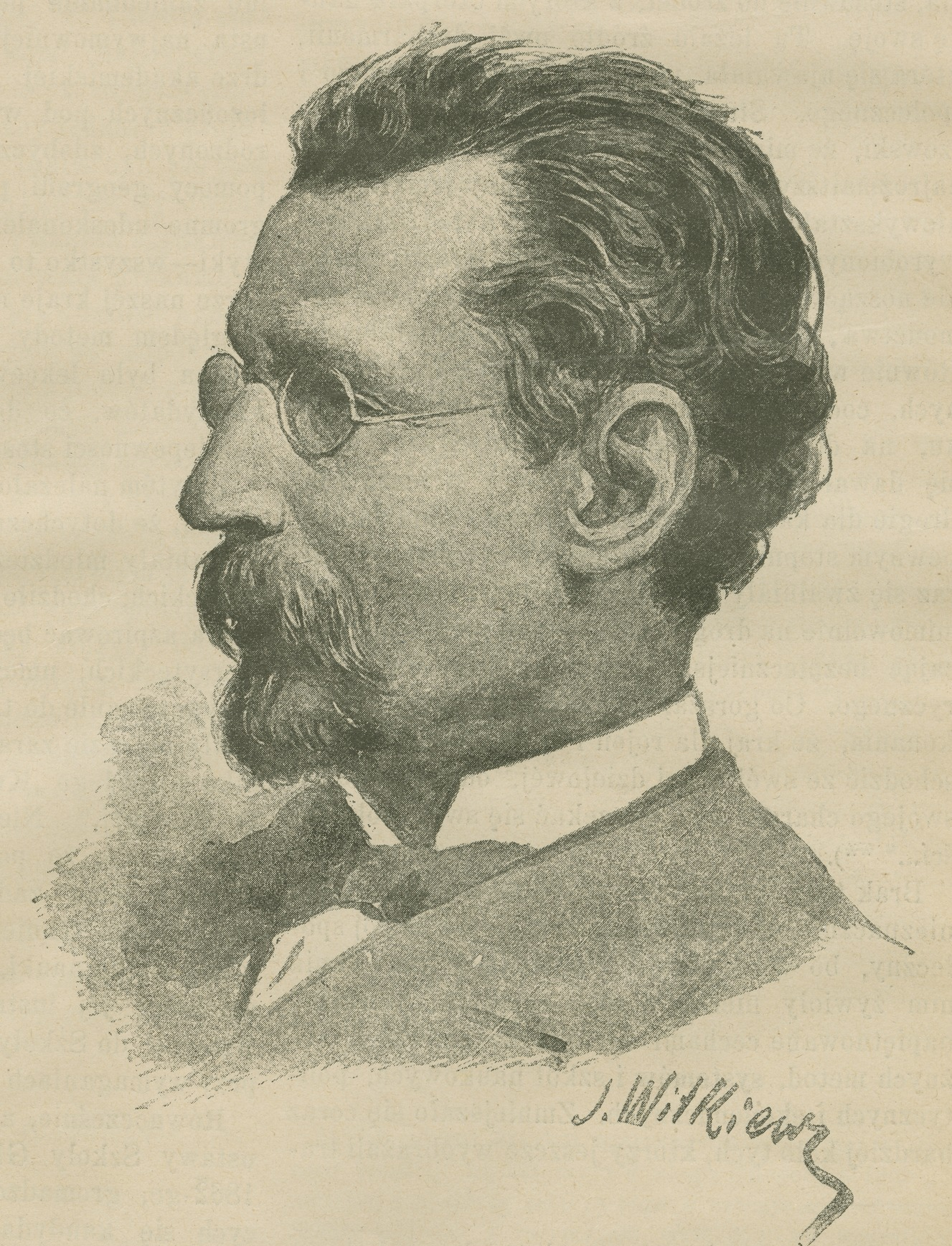
Prus, drawn by his friend Stanisław Witkiewicz, 1887

In time, Prus adopted the French Positivist critic Hippolyte Taine's concept of the arts, including literature, as a second means, alongside the sciences, of studying reality, and he devoted more attention to his sideline of short-story writer. Prus's stories, which met with great acclaim, owed much to the literary influence of Polish novelist Józef Ignacy Kraszewski and, among English-language writers, to Charles Dickens and Mark Twain. His fiction was also influenced by French writers Victor Hugo, Gustave Flaubert, Alphonse Daudet and Émile Zola.

Prus wrote several dozen stories, originally published in newspapers and ranging in length from micro-story to novella. Characteristic of them are Prus's keen observation of everyday life and sense of humor, which he had early honed as a contributor to humor magazines. The prevalence of themes from everyday life is consistent with the Polish Positivist artistic program, which sought to portray the circumstances of the populace rather than those of the Romantic heroes of an earlier generation. The literary period in which Prus wrote was ostensibly a prosaic one, by contrast with the poetry of the Romantics; but Prus's prose is often a poetic prose. His stories also often contain elements of fantasy or whimsy. A fair number originally appeared in New Year's issues of newspapers.

Prus long eschewed writing historical fiction, arguing that it must inevitably distort history. He criticized contemporary historical novelists for their lapses in historical accuracy, including Henryk Sienkiewicz's failure, in the military scenes in his Trilogy portraying 17th-century Polish history, to describe the logistics of warfare. It was only in 1888, when Prus was forty, that he wrote his first historical fiction, the stunning short story, "A Legend of Old Egypt." This story, a few years later, served as a preliminary sketch for his only historical novel, Pharaoh (1895).

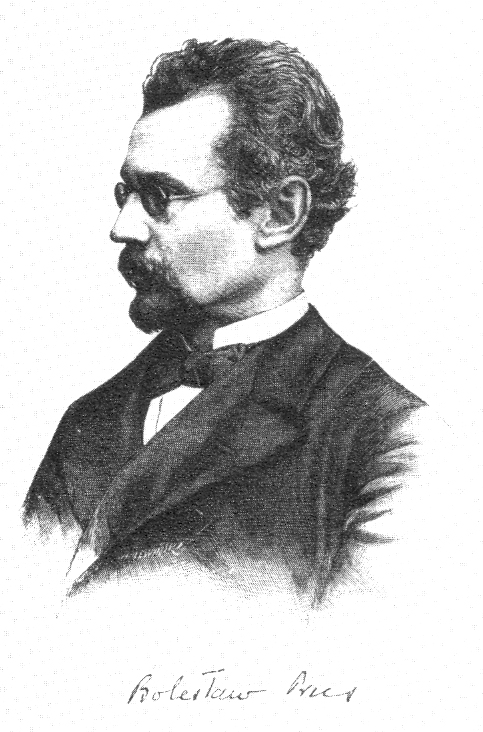
Prus, frontispiece to 1890 book edition of The Doll

Eventually Prus composed four novels on what he had referred to in an 1884 letter as "great questions of our age": The Outpost (Placówka, 1886) on the Polish peasant; The Doll (Lalka, 1889) on the aristocracy and townspeople and on idealists struggling to bring about social reforms; The New Woman (Emancypantki, 1893) on feminist concerns; and his only historical novel, Pharaoh (Faraon, 1895), on mechanisms of political power. The work of greatest sweep and most universal appeal is Pharaoh. Prus's novels, like his stories, were originally published in newspaper serialization.

After having sold Pharaoh to the publishing firm of Gebethner and Wolff, Prus embarked, on 16 May 1895, on a four-month journey abroad. He visited Berlin, Dresden, Karlsbad, Nuremberg, Stuttgart and Rapperswil. At the latter Swiss town he stayed two months (July–August), nursing his agoraphobia and spending much time with his friends, the promising young writer Stefan Żeromski and his wife Oktawia. The couple sought Prus's help for the Polish National Museum, housed in the Rapperswil Castle, where Żeromski was librarian.

The final stage of Prus's journey took him to Paris, where he was prevented by his agoraphobia from crossing the Seine River to visit the city's southern Left Bank. He was nevertheless pleased to find that his descriptions of Paris in The Doll had been on the mark (he had based them mainly on French-language publications). From Paris, he hurried home to recuperate at Nałęczów from his journey, the last that he made abroad.

=== Later years ===
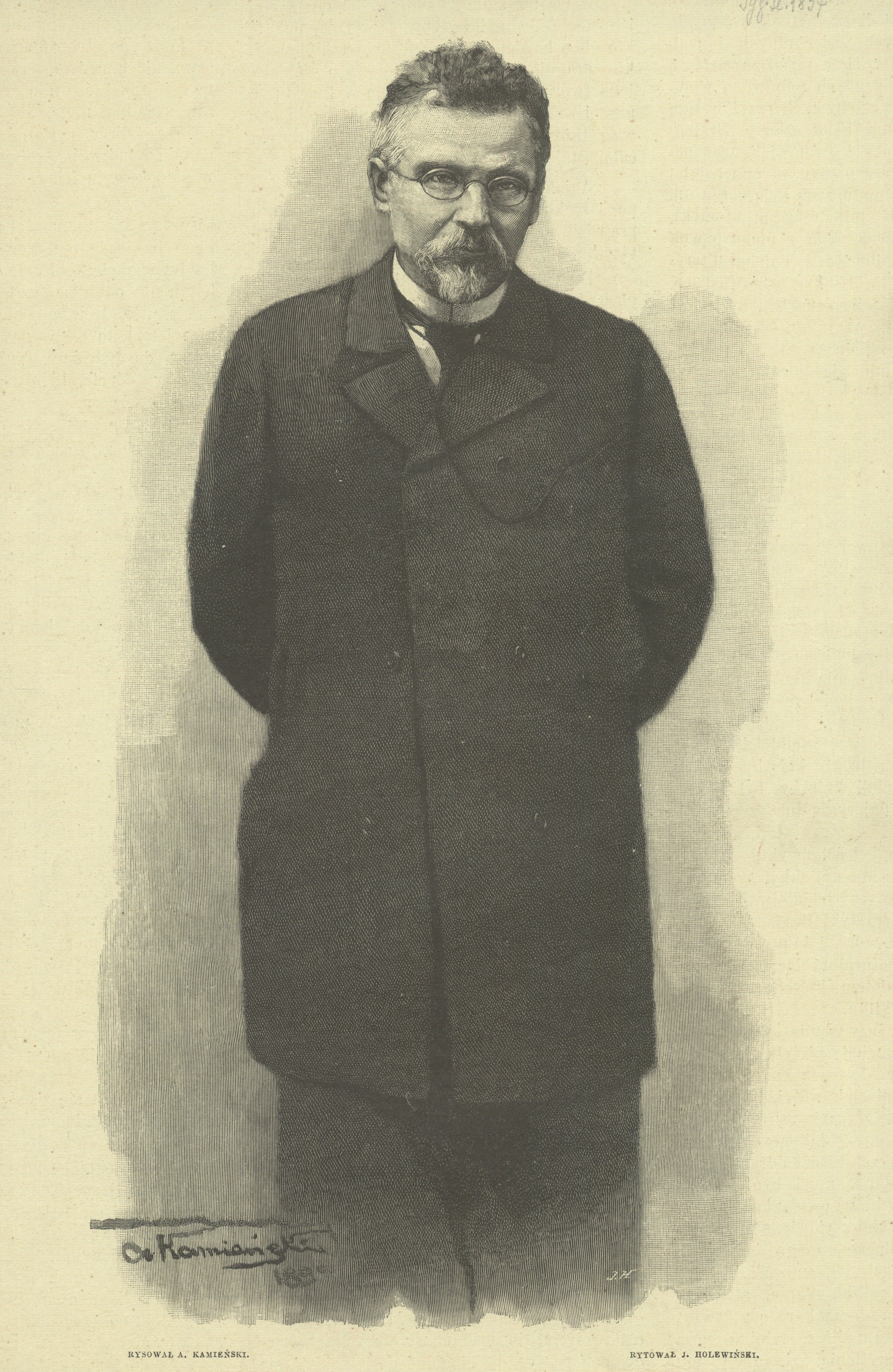
Portrait, 1897, celebrating Prus' 25 years as journalist and fiction writer

Over the years, Prus lent his support to many charitable and social causes, but there was one event he came to rue for the broad criticism it brought him: his participation in welcoming Russia's tsar during Nicholas II's 1897 visit to Warsaw. As a rule, Prus did not affiliate himself with political parties, as this might compromise his journalistic objectivity. His associations, by design and temperament, were with individuals and select worthy causes rather than with large groups.

The disastrous January 1863 Uprising had persuaded Prus that society must advance through learning, work and commerce rather than through risky social upheavals. He departed from this stance, however, in 1905, when Imperial Russia experienced defeat in the Russo-Japanese War and Poles demanded autonomy and reforms. On 20 December 1905, in the first issue of a short-lived periodical, Młodość (Youth), he published an article, "Oda do młodości" ("Ode to Youth"), whose title harked back to an 1820 poem by Adam Mickiewicz. Prus wrote, in reference to his earlier position on revolution and strikes: "with the greatest pleasure, I admit it—I was wrong!"

In 1908, Prus serialized, in the Warsaw Tygodnik Ilustrowany (Illustrated Weekly), his novel Dzieci (Children), depicting the young revolutionaries, terrorists and anarchists of the day – an uncharacteristically humorless work. Three years later a final novel, Przemiany (Changes), was to have been, like The Doll, a panorama of society and its vital concerns. However, in 1911 and 1912, the novel had barely begun serialization in the Illustrated Weekly when its composition was cut short by Prus's death.

Neither of the two late novels, Children or Changes, is generally regarded as part of the essential Prus canon, and Czesław Miłosz has called Children one of Prus's weakest works.

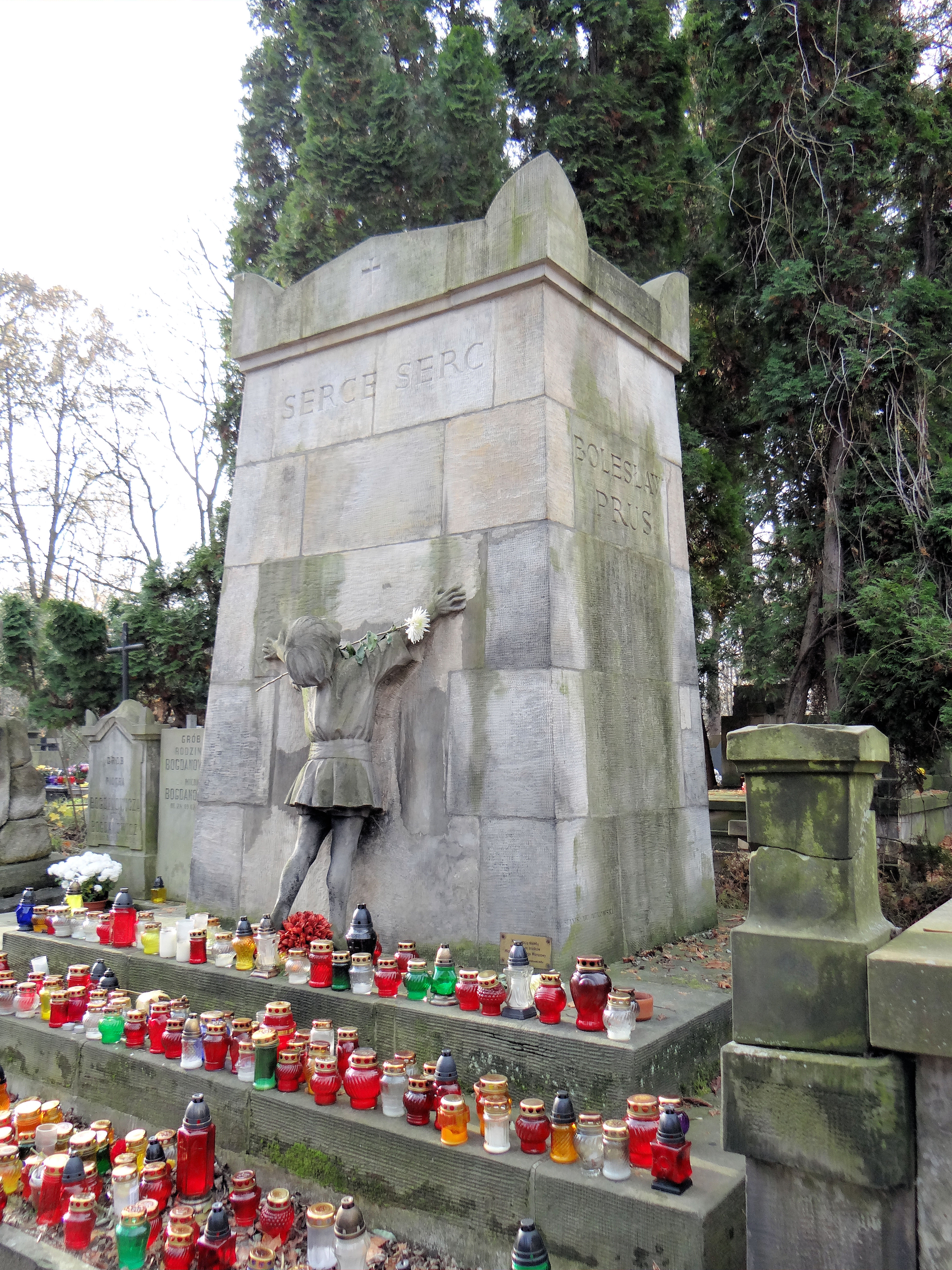
Prus' tomb at Warsaw's Powązki Cemetery

Prus' last novel to meet with popular acclaim was Pharaoh, completed in 1895. Depicting the demise of ancient Egypt's Twentieth Dynasty and New Kingdom three thousand years earlier, Pharaoh had also reflected Poland's loss of independence a century before in 1795—an independence whose post-World War I restoration Prus did not live to see.

On 19 May 1912, in his Warsaw apartment at 12 Wolf Street (ulica Wilcza 12), near Triple Cross Square, his forty-year journalistic and literary career came to an end when the 64-year-old author died.

He was mourned by the nation that he had striven, as soldier, thinker, and writer, to rescue from oblivion. Thousands attended his 22 May 1912 funeral service at St. Alexander's Church on nearby Triple Cross Square (Plac Trzech Krzyży) and his interment at Powązki Cemetery.

Prus's tomb was designed by his nephew, the noted sculptor Stanisław Jackowski. On three sides it bears, respectively, the novelist's name, Aleksander Głowacki, his years of birth and death, and his pen name, Bolesław Prus. The epitaph on the fourth side, "Serce Serc" ("Heart of Hearts"), was deliberately borrowed from the Latin "Cor Cordium" on the grave of the English Romantic poet Percy Bysshe Shelley in Rome's Protestant Cemetery. Below the epitaph stands the figure of a little girl embracing the tomb – a figure emblematic of Prus's well-known empathy and affection for children.

Prus's widow, Oktawia Głowacka, survived him by twenty-four years, dying on 25 October 1936.

In 1902 the editor of the Warsaw Kurier Codzienny (Daily Courier) had opined that, if Prus's writings had been well known abroad, he should have received one of the recently created Nobel Prizes.

== Legacy ==
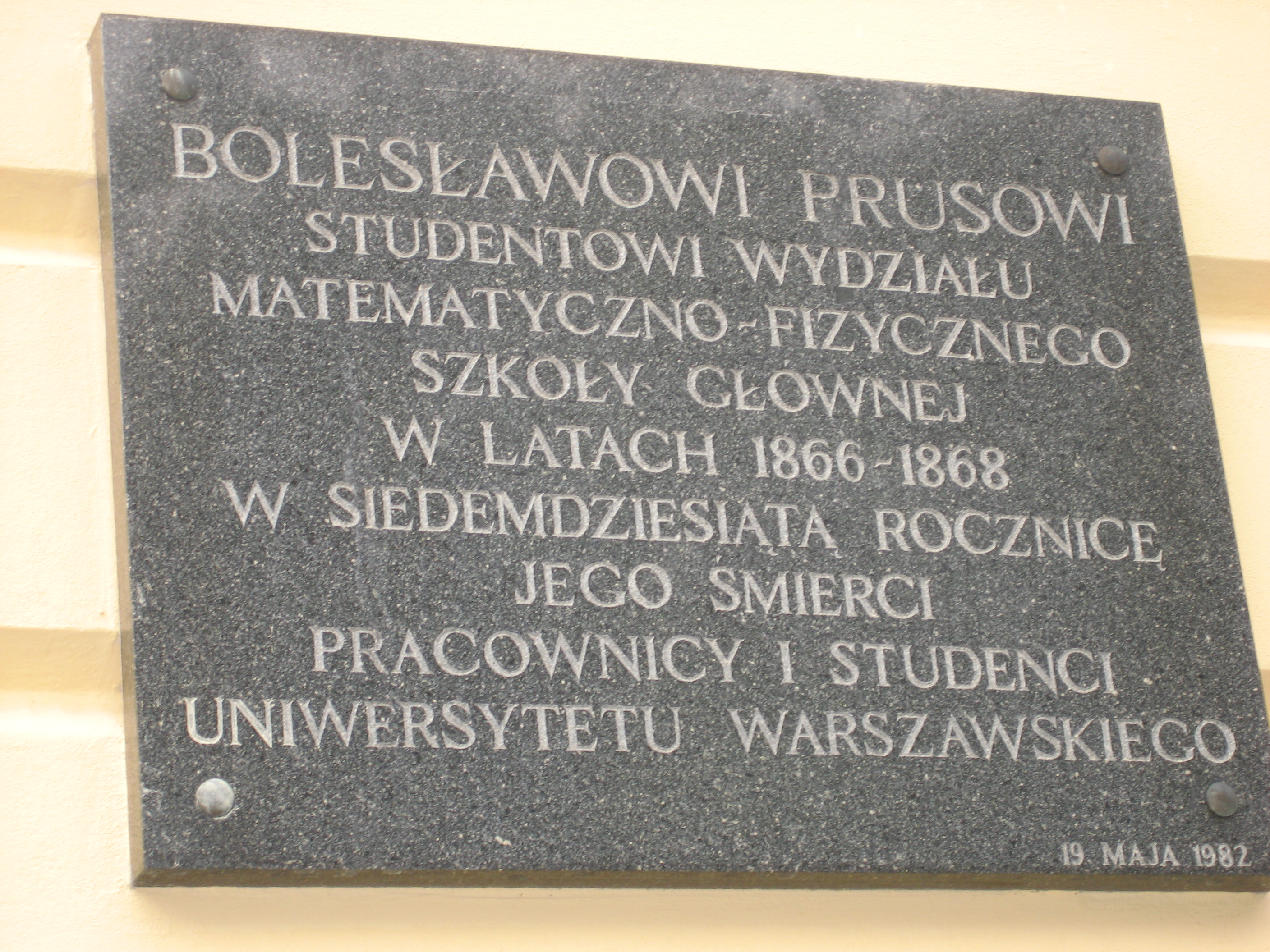
Plaque on Warsaw University's Kazimierz Palace, commemorating student Bolesław Prus

On 3 December 1961, nearly half a century after Prus's death, a museum devoted to him was opened in the 18th-century Małachowski Palace at Nałęczów, near Lublin in eastern Poland. Outside the palace is a sculpture of Prus seated on a bench. Another statuary monument to Prus at Nałęczów, sculpted by Alina Ślesińska, was unveiled on 8 May 1966. It was at Nałęczów that Prus vacationed for thirty years from 1882 until his death, and that he met the young Stefan Żeromski. Prus stood witness at Żeromski's 1892 wedding and generously helped foster the younger man's literary career.

While Prus espoused a positivist and realist outlook, much in his fiction shows qualities compatible with pre-1863-Uprising Polish Romantic literature. Indeed, he held the Polish Romantic poet Adam Mickiewicz in high regard. Prus's novels in turn, especially The Doll and Pharaoh, with their innovative composition techniques, blazed the way for the 20th-century Polish novel.

Prus' novel The Doll, with its rich realistic detail and simple, functional language, was considered by Czesław Miłosz to be the great Polish novel.

Joseph Conrad, during his 1914 visit to Poland just as World War I was breaking out, "delighted in his beloved Prus" and read everything by the ten-years-older, recently deceased author that he could get his hands on. He pronounced The New Woman (the first novel by Prus that he read) "better than Dickens"—Dickens being a favorite author of Conrad's. Miłosz, however, thought The New Woman "as a whole... an artistic failure..." Zygmunt Szweykowski similarly faulted The New Woman's loose, tangential construction; but this, in his view, was partly redeemed by Prus's humor and by some superb episodes, while "The tragedy of Mrs. Latter and the picture of [the town of] Iksinów are among the peak achievements of [Polish] novel-writing."

Pharaoh, a study of political power, became the favorite novel of Soviet dictator Joseph Stalin, prefigured the fate of U.S. President John F. Kennedy, and continues to point analogies to more recent times. Pharaoh is often described as Prus's "best-composed novel"—indeed, "one of the best-composed [of all] Polish novels." This was due in part to Pharaoh having been composed complete prior to newspaper serialization, rather than being written in installments just before printing, as was the case with Prus's earlier major novels.

The Doll and Pharaoh are available in English versions. The Doll has been translated into twenty-eight languages, and Pharaoh into twenty-four. In addition, The Doll has been filmed several times (including a 1968 film directed by Wojciech Jerzy Has) and been produced as a 1977 television miniseries (Lalka, directed by Ryszard Ber). Pharaoh was adapted into a 1966 feature film.

Between 1897 and 1899 Prus serialized in the Warsaw Daily Courier (Kurier Codzienny) a monograph on The Most General Life Ideals (Najogólniejsze ideały życiowe), which systematized ethical ideas that he had developed over his career regarding happiness, utility and perfection in the lives of individuals and societies. As the monograph's epitome, he wrote: "Perfect your Will, Mind, and Feeling, their corporal organs, and their material tools; be useful to yourselves, to your own ones, and to others, and Happiness, insofar as it exists on this earth, will come of itself." In the monograph, he returned to the society-organizing (i.e., political) interests that had been frustrated during his Nowiny editorship fifteen years earlier. A book edition appeared in 1901 (2nd, revised edition, 1905). This work, rooted in Jeremy Bentham's Utilitarian philosophy and Herbert Spencer's view of society-as-organism, retains interest especially for philosophers and social scientists.

Another of Prus's learned projects remained incomplete at his death. He had sought, over his writing career, to develop a coherent theory of literary composition. Notes of his from 1886 to 1912 were never put together into a finished book as he had intended. (Note: In 1890 Prus wrote: "When I was starting out as a writer, I wrote in part instinctively, in part by inadvertent imitation. My productions were a collection of haphazard observations, put together no doubt against the backdrop of what I had read. Every beginning author does the same. To be sure, this kind of work was to me a great mortification. [...] Then I began asking older authors, and they told me that 'there are no rules, nor can there be any, for the art of novel-writing.' [...] Then [about 1880], brought to desperation, I set about trying to resolve for myself the question: 'Can literary art be reduced to general rules?' After several years of observing and thinking, the matter began to get clearer for me, and as early as August 1886 I set down my first notes [...] and, God willing, I hope to publish a scientific theory of literary art. I expect that it will contain some fairly new things.") His precepts included the maxim, "Nouns, nouns and more nouns." Some particularly intriguing fragments describe Prus's combinatorial calculations of the millions of potential "individual types" of human characters, given a stated number of "individual traits."

A curious comparative-literature aspect has been noted to Prus's career, which paralleled that of his American contemporary, Ambrose Bierce (1842–1914). Each was born and reared in a rural area and had a "Polish" connection (Bierce, born five years before Prus, was reared in Kosciusko County, Indiana, and attended high school at the county seat, Warsaw, Indiana). Each became a war casualty with combat head trauma—Prus in 1863 in the Polish 1863–65 Uprising; Bierce in 1864 in the American Civil War. Each experienced false starts in other occupations, and at twenty-five became a journalist for the next forty years; failed to sustain a career as editor-in-chief; achieved celebrity as a short-story writer; lost a son in tragic circumstances (Prus, an adopted son; Bierce, both his sons); attained superb humorous effects by portraying human egoism (Prus especially in Pharaoh, Bierce in The Devil's Dictionary); was dogged from early adulthood by a health problem (Prus, agoraphobia; Bierce, asthma); and died within two years of the other (Prus in 1912; Bierce presumably in 1914). Prus, however, unlike Bierce, went on from short stories to write novels.

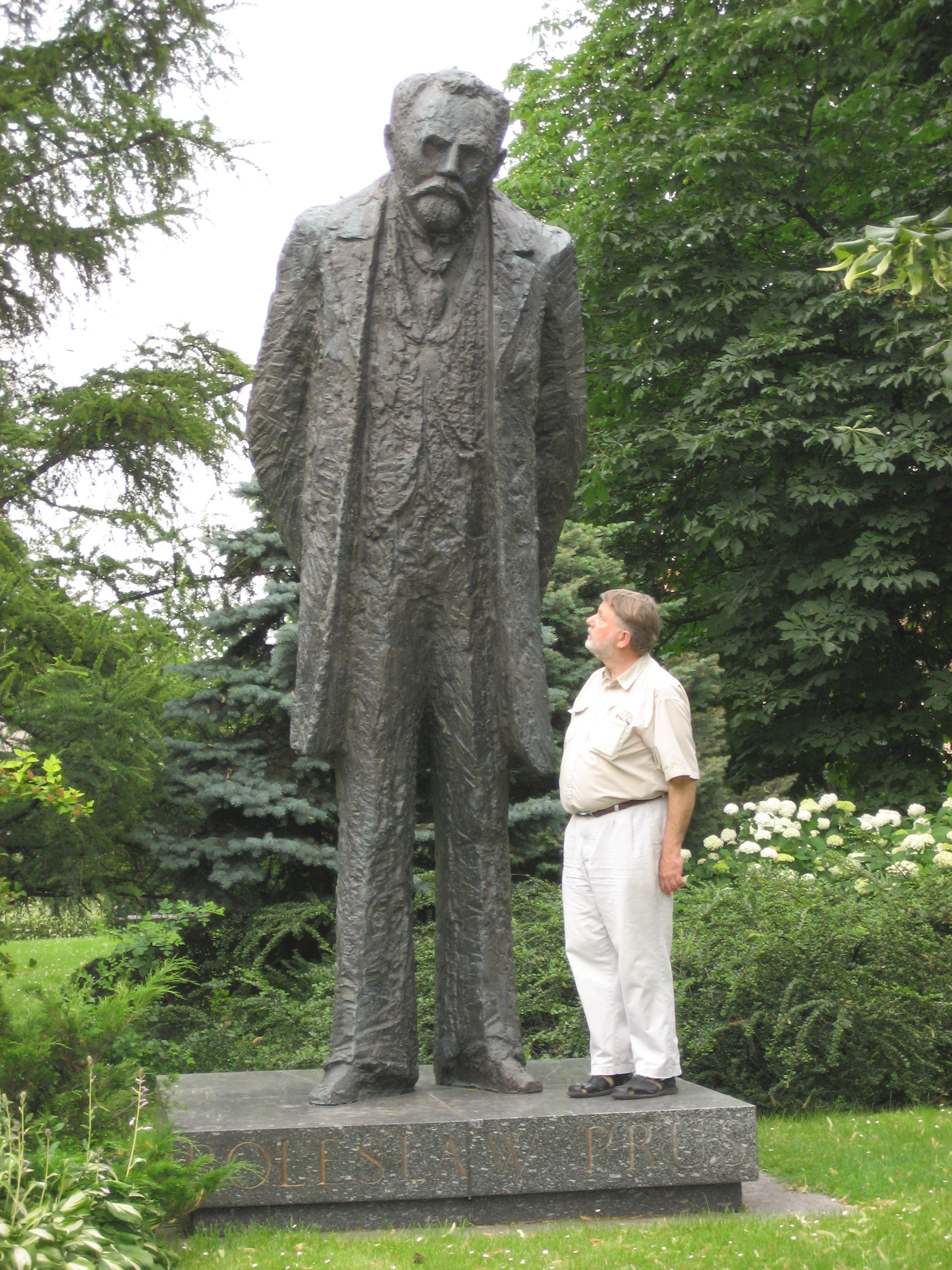
Over twice-lifesize Prus statue on Warsaw's Krakowskie Przedmieście

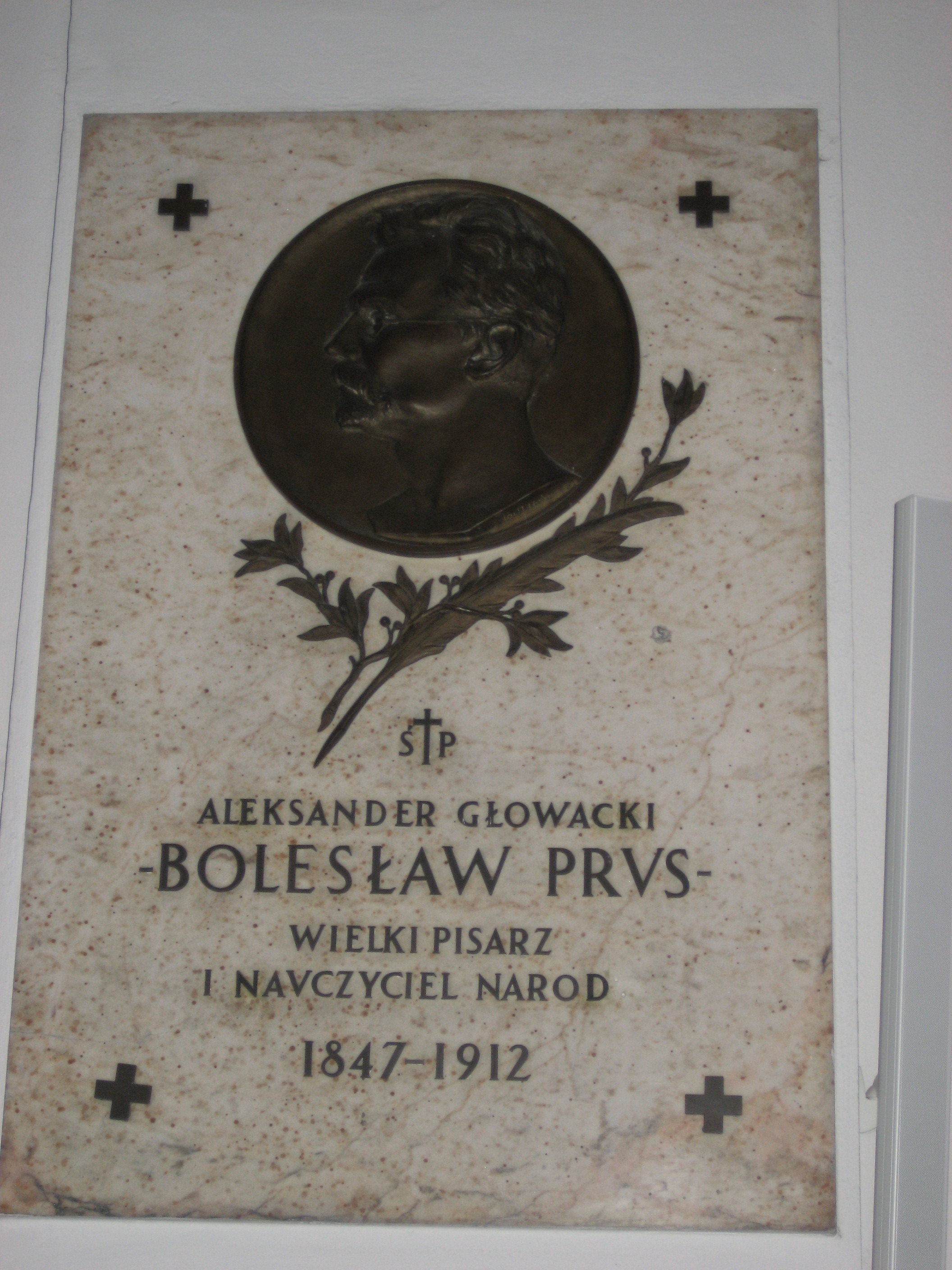
Plaque, Holy Cross Church, Warsaw, commemorating Prus, "great writer and teacher of the nation"

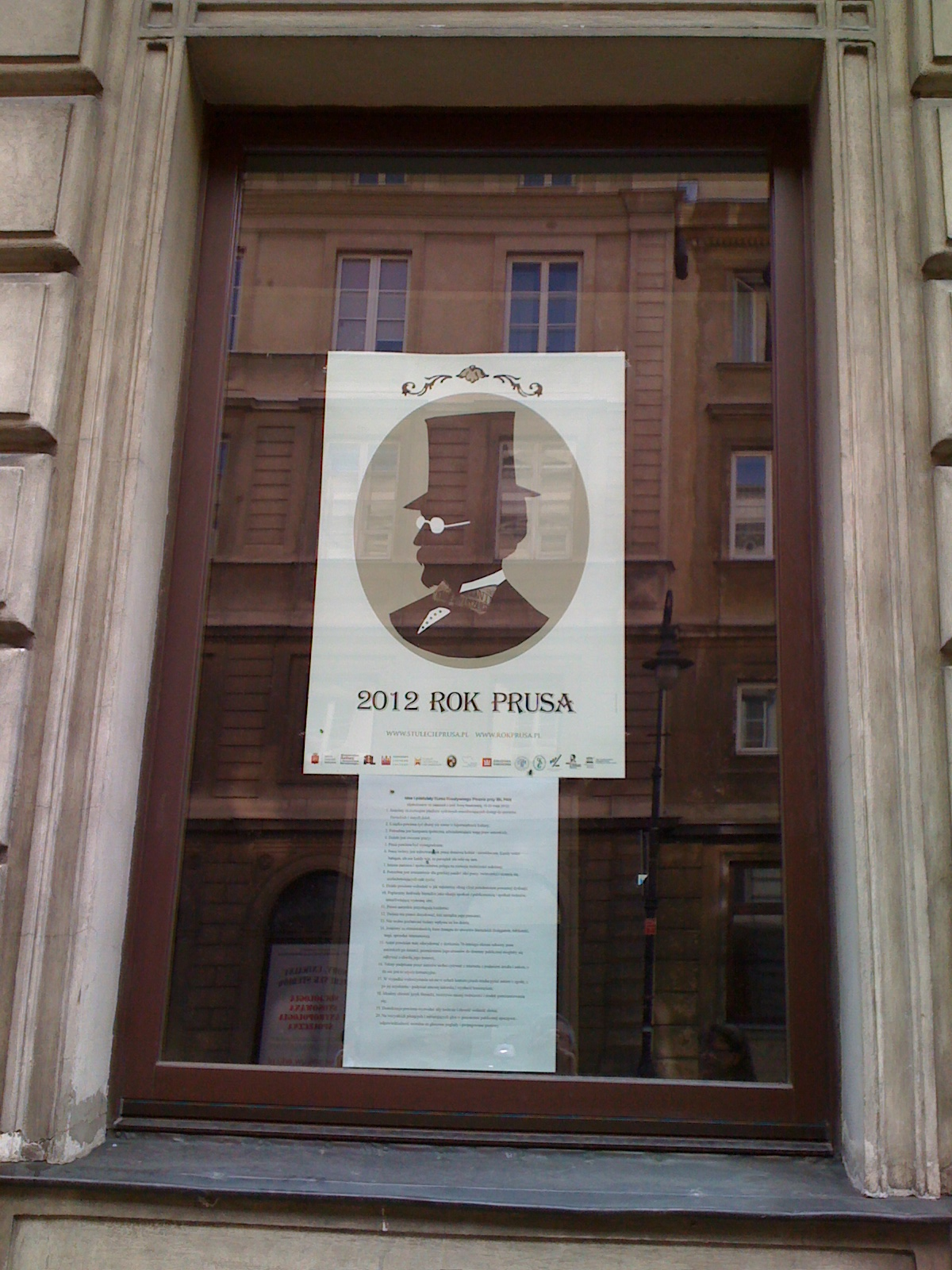
"2012: Year of Prus": poster commemorating 100th anniversary of Prus' death, in a window of the Polish Academy of Sciences, Krakowskie Przedmieście, Warsaw

In Prus' lifetime and since, his contributions to Polish literature and culture have been memorialized without regard to the nature of the political system prevailing at the time. His 50th birthday, in 1897, was marked by special newspaper issues celebrating his 25 years as a journalist and fiction writer, and a portrait of him was commissioned from artist Antoni Kamieński.

The town where Prus was born, Hrubieszów, near the present Polish–Ukrainian border, is graced by an outdoor sculpture of him.

A 1982 plaque on Warsaw University's administration building, the historic Kazimierz Palace, commemorates Prus' years at the university in 1866–68. Across the street (Krakowskie Przedmieście) from the university, in Holy Cross Church, adjacent to the pillar that holds Chopin's heart, a 1936 plaque by Prus' nephew Stanisław Jackowski, featuring Prus' profile, is dedicated to the memory of the "great writer and teacher of the nation."

On the front of Warsaw's present-day ulica Wilcza 12 (12 Wolf Street), the site of Prus' last home, is a plaque commemorating the earlier, now-nonexistent building's most famous resident. A few hundred meters from there, ulica Bolesława Prusa (Bolesław Prus Street) debouches into the southeast corner of Warsaw's Triple Cross Square. In this square stands St. Alexander's Church, where Prus' funeral was held.

In 1937, plaques were installed at Warsaw's Krakowskie Przedmieście 4 and 7, where the two chief characters of Prus' novel The Doll, Stanisław Wokulski and Ignacy Rzecki, respectively, were deduced to have resided. On the same street, in a park adjacent to the Hotel Bristol, near the site of a newspaper for which Prus wrote, stands the Bolesław Prus Monument, a twice-life-size statue of Prus, sculpted in 1977 by Anna Kamieńska-Łapińska; it is some 12 feet tall, on a minimal pedestal as befits an author who walked the same ground with his fellow men.

Consonant with Prus' interest in commerce and technology, a Polish Ocean Lines freighter has been named for him.

For 10 years, from 1975 to 1984, Poles honored Prus' memory with a 10-zloty coin featuring his profile. In 2012, to mark the 100th anniversary of his death, the Polish mint produced three coins with individual designs: in gold, silver, and an aluminum-zinc alloy.

Prus' fiction and nonfiction writings continue relevant in our time.

== Writings ==
Following is a chronological list of notable works by Bolesław Prus. Translated titles are given, followed by original titles and dates of publication.

=== Novels ===
- Souls in Bondage (Dusze w niewoli, written 1876, serialized 1877)
- Fame (Sława, begun 1885, never finished)
- The Outpost (Placówka, 1885–86)
- The Doll (Lalka, 1887–89)
- The New Woman (Emancypantki, 1890–93)
- Pharaoh (Faraon, written 1894–95; serialized 1895–96; published in book form 1897)
- Children (Dzieci, 1908; approximately the first nine chapters had originally appeared, in a somewhat different form, in 1907 as Dawn [Świt])
- Changes (Przemiany, begun 1911–12; unfinished)

=== Stories ===
- "Granny's Troubles" ("Kłopoty babuni", 1874)
- "The Palace and the Hovel" ("Pałac i rudera", 1875)
- "The Ball Gown" ("Sukienka balowa", 1876)
- "An Orphan's Lot" ("Sieroca dola", 1876)
- "Eddy's Adventures" ("Przygody Edzia", 1876)
- "Damnable Happiness" ("Przeklęte szczęście", 1876)
- "The Honeymoon" ("Miesiąc nektarowy", 1876)
- "In the Struggle with Life" ("W walce z życiem", 1877)
- "Christmas Eve" ("Na gwiazdkę", 1877)
- "Grandmother's Box" ("Szkatułka babki", 1878)
- "Little Stan's Adventure" ("Przygoda Stasia", 1879)
- "New Year" ("Nowy rok", 1880)
- "The Returning Wave" ("Powracająca fala", 1880)
- "Michałko" (1880)
- "Antek" (1880)
- "The Convert" ("Nawrócony", 1880)
- "The Barrel Organ" ("Katarynka", 1880)
- "One of Many" ("Jeden z wielu", 1882)
- "The Waistcoat" ("Kamizelka", 1882)
- "Him" ("On", 1882)
- "Fading Voices" ("Milknące głosy", 1883)
- "Sins of Childhood" ("Grzechy dzieciństwa", 1883)
- "Mold of the Earth" ("Pleśń świata", 1884: a brilliant micro-story portraying human history as an endless series of conflicts among mold colonies inhabiting a common boulder)
- "The Living Telegraph" ("Żywy telegraf", 1884)
- "Orestes and Pylades" ("Orestes i Pylades", 1884)
- "She Loves Me?... She Loves Me Not?..." ("Kocha—nie kocha?...", a micro-story, 1884)
- "The Mirror" ("Zwierciadło", 1884)
- "On Vacation" ("Na wakacjach", 1884)
- "An Old Tale" ("Stara bajka", 1884)
- "In the Light of the Moon" ("Przy księżycu", 1884)
- "A Mistake" ("Omyłka," 1884)
- "Mr. Dutkowski and His Farm" ("Pan Dutkowski i jego folwark", 1884)
- "Musical Echoes" ("Echa muzyczne", 1884)
- "In the Mountains" ("W górach", 1885)
- "Shades" ("Ciene", 1885: an evocative micro-story on existential themes)
- "Anielka" (1885)
- "A Strange Story" ("Dziwna historia," 1887)
- "A Legend of Old Egypt" ("Z legend dawnego Egiptu", 1888: Prus's stunning first piece of historical fiction; a preliminary sketch for his only historical novel, Pharaoh, which he wrote in 1894–95)
- "The Dream" ("Sen", 1890)
- "Lives of Saints" ("Z żywotów świętych", 1891–92)
- "Reconciled" ("Pojednani", 1892)
- "A Composition by Little Frank: About Mercy" ("Z wypracowań małego Frania. O miłosierdziu", 1898)
- "The Doctor's Story" ("Opowiadanie lekarza", 1902)
- "Memoirs of a Cyclist" ("Ze wspomnień cyklisty", 1903)
- "Revenge" ("Zemsta", 1908)
- "Phantoms" ("Widziadła", 1911, first published 1936)

=== Nonfiction ===
- "Letters from the Old Camp" ("Listy ze starego obozu"), 1872: Prus's first composition signed with the pseudonym Bolesław Prus.
- "On the Structure of the Universe" ("O budowie wszechświata"), public lecture, 23 February 1873.
- "On Discoveries and Inventions" ("O odkryciach i wynalazkach"): A Public Lecture Delivered on 23 March 1873 by Aleksander Głowacki [Bolesław Prus], Passed by the [Russian] Censor (Warsaw, 21 April 1873), Warsaw, Printed by F. Krokoszyńska, 1873. Translated from the Polish by Christopher Kasparek.
- "Travel Notes (Wieliczka)" ["Kartki z podróży (Wieliczka)," 1878—Prus's impressions of the Wieliczka Salt Mine; these helped inform the conception of the Egyptian Labyrinth in Prus's 1895 novel, Pharaoh]
- "A Word to the Public" ("Słówko do publiczności," 11 June 1882 – Prus's inaugural address to readers as the new editor-in-chief of the daily, Nowiny [News], famously proposing to make it "an observatory of societal facts, just as there are observatories that study the movements of heavenly bodies, or—climatic changes.")
- "Sketch for a Program under the Conditions of the Present Development of Society" ("Szkic programu w warunkach obecnego rozwoju społeczeństwa," 23–30 March 1883—swan song of Prus's editorship of Nowiny)
- "With Sword and Fire—Henryk Sienkiewicz's Novel of Olden Times" ("Ogniem i mieczem—powieść z dawnych lat Henryka Sienkiewicza," 1884—Prus's review of Sienkiewicz's historical novel, and essay on historical novels)
- "The Paris Tower" ("Wieża paryska," 1887—whimsical divagations involving the Eiffel Tower, the world's tallest structure, then yet to be constructed for the 1889 Paris Exposition Universelle)
- "Travels on Earth and in Heaven" ("Wędrówka po ziemi i niebie," 1887—Prus's impressions of a solar eclipse that he observed at Mława; these helped inspire the solar-eclipse scenes in his 1895 novel, Pharaoh)
- "A Word about Positive Criticism" ("Słówko o krytyce pozytywnej," 1890—Prus's part of a polemic with Positivist guru Aleksander Świętochowski)
- "Eusapia Palladino" (1893—a newspaper column about mediumistic séances held in Warsaw by the Italian Spiritualist, Eusapia Palladino; these helped inspire similar scenes in Prus's 1895 novel, Pharaoh)
- "From Nałęczów" ("Z Nałęczowa," 1894—Prus's paean to the salubrious waters and natural and social environment of his favorite vacation spot, Nałęczów)
- The Most General Life Ideals (Najogólniejsze ideały życiowe, 1905—Prus's system of pragmatic ethics)
- "Ode to Youth" ("Oda do młodości," 1905—Prus's admission that, before the Russian Empire's defeat in the Russo-Japanese War, he had held too cautious a view of the chances for an improvement in Poland's political situation)
- "Visions of the Future" ("Wizje przyszłości," 1909—a discussion of H. G. Wells' 1901 futurological book, Anticipations, which predicted, among other things, the defeat of German imperialism, the ascendancy of the English language, and the existence, by the year 2000, of a "European Union" that included the Slavic peoples of Central Europe)
- "The Poet, Educator of the Nation" ("Poeta wychowawca narodu," 1910—a discussion of the cultural and political principles imparted by the Polish poet Adam Mickiewicz)
- "What We... Never Learned from the History of Napoleon" ("Czego nas... nie nauczyły dzieje Napoleona"—Prus's contribution to 16 December 1911 issue of the Warsaw Illustrated Weekly, devoted entirely to Napoleon)

== Translations ==
Prus' writings have been translated into many languages – his historical novel Pharaoh, into twenty-four; his contemporary novel The Doll, into twenty-eight.

== Film versions ==
- 1966: Faraon (Pharaoh), adapted from the novel Pharaoh, directed by Jerzy Kawalerowicz
- 1968: Lalka (The Doll), adapted from the novel The Doll, directed by Wojciech Jerzy Has
- 1977: Lalka (TV serial, The Doll), adapted from the novel The Doll, directed by Ryszard Ber
- 1979: Placówka (The Outpost), adapted from the novel The Outpost, directed by Zygmunt Skonieczny
- 1982: Pensja pani Latter (Mrs. Latter's Boarding School), adapted from the novel The New Woman, directed by Stanisław Różewicz
- 2026: Lalka (The Doll), adapted from the novel The Doll, directed by Maciej Kawalski

== See also ==
- Bolesław Prus Monument
- Flash fiction
- History of philosophy in Poland
- List of coupled cousins
- List of newspaper columnists
- List of Poles—Philosophy
- List of Poles—Prose literature
- Political fiction
- Positivism in Poland
- Zakopane

== Sources ==
- Fita, Stanisław, ed. (1962). Wspomnienia o Bolesławie Prusie (Reminiscences about Bolesław Prus). Warsaw: Państwowy Instytut Wydawniczy.
- Jan Zygmunt Jakubowski, ed., Literatura polska od średniowiecza do pozytywizmu (Polish Literature from the Middle Ages to Positivism), Warsaw, Państwowe Wydawnictwo Naukowe, 1979.
- Christopher Kasparek, "Prus' Pharaoh: the Creation of a Historical Novel", The Polish Review, vol. XXXIX, no. 1, 1994, pp. 45–50.
- Christopher Kasparek, "Two Micro-stories by Bolesław Prus", The Polish Review, vol. XL, no. 1, 1995, pp. 99–103.
- Christopher Kasparek, "Prus' Pharaoh: Primer on Power", The Polish Review, vol. XL, no. 3, 1995, pp. 331–34.
- Christopher Kasparek, "Prus' Pharaoh and the Wieliczka Salt Mine", The Polish Review, vol. XLII, no. 3, 1997, pp. 349–55.
- Christopher Kasparek, "Prus' Pharaoh and the Solar Eclipse", The Polish Review, vol. XLII, no. 4, 1997, pp. 471–78.
- Christopher Kasparek, "A Futurological Note: Prus on H. G. Wells and the Year 2000," The Polish Review, vol. XLVIII, no. 1, 2003, pp. 89–100.
- Melkowski, Stefan (1963). Poglądy estetyczne i działalność krytycznoliteracka Bolesława Prusa (Bolesław Prus' Esthetic Views and Literary-Critical Activity). Warsaw: Państwowy Instytut Wydawniczy.
- Miłosz, Czesław (1983), The History of Polish Literature, second edition, Berkeley, University of California Press, ISBN 0-520-04477-0.
- Zdzisław Najder, Conrad under Familial Eyes, Cambridge University Press, 1984, ISBN 0-521-25082-X.
- Zdzisław Najder, Joseph Conrad: A Life, translated by Halina Najder, Rochester, Camden House, 2007, ISBN 1-57113-347-X.
- Pauszer-Klonowska, Gabriela (1962). Ostatnia miłość w życiu Bolesława Prusa (The Last Love in the Life of Bolesław Prus). Warsaw: Państwowy Instytut Wydawniczy.
- Monika Piątkowska, Prus: Śledztwo biograficzne (Prus: A Biographical Investigation), Kraków, Wydawnictwo Znak, 2017, ISBN 978-83-240-4543-3.
- Pieścikowski, Edward (1985). Bolesław Prus (2nd ed.). Warsaw: Państwowe Wydawnictwo Naukowe. ISBN 83-01-05593-6.
- Bolesław Prus, On Discoveries and Inventions: A Public Lecture Delivered on 23 March 1873 by Aleksander Głowacki [Bolesław Prus], Passed by the [Russian] Censor (Warsaw, 21 April 1873), Warsaw, Printed by F. Krokoszyńska, 1873.
- Prus, Bolesław (1996). The Sins of Childhood & Other Stories. translated by Bill Johnston. Evanston, Illinois: Northwestern University Press. ISBN 0-8101-1462-3. (This book contains twelve stories by Prus, including the volume's title story, in inaccurate, clunky translations.)
- Prus, Bolesław (1996). The Doll. translation by David Welsh, revised by Dariusz Tołczyk and Anna Zaranko, and introduction by Stanisław Barańczak. Budapest: Central European University Press. ISBN 1-85866-065-3.
- Prus, Bolesław (2001). Pharaoh. translation by Christopher Kasparek (2nd ed.). Warsaw: Polestar Publications. ISBN 83-88177-01-X.
- Robert Reid, Marie Curie, New York, New American Library, 1974.
- Szweykowski, Zygmunt (1967). Nie tylko o Prusie: szkice (Not Only about Prus: Sketches) (1st ed.). Poznań: Wydawnictwo Poznańskie.
- Szweykowski, Zygmunt (1972). Twórczość Bolesława Prusa (The Writings of Bolesław Prus) (2nd ed.). Warsaw: Państwowy Instytut Wydawniczy.
- Tokarzówna, Krystyna; Stanisław Fita (1969). Szweykowski, Zygmunt (ed.). Bolesław Prus, 1847–1912: Kalendarz życia i twórczości (Bolesław Prus, 1847–1912: a Calendar of His Life and Work). Warsaw: Państwowy Instytut Wydawniczy.
- Tokarzówna, Krystyna (1981), Młodość Bolesława Prusa (Bolesław Prus' Youth), Warsaw, Państwowy Instytut Wydawniczy, ISBN 83-06-00603-8.
- Tyszkiewicz, Teresa (1971). Bolesław Prus. Warsaw: Państwowe Zakłady Wydawnictw Szkolnych.
- Wróblewski, Zbigniew (1984). To samo ramię (The Same Arm). Warsaw: Wydawnictwo Ministerstwa Obrony Narodowej (Ministry of National Defense). ISBN 83-11-07127-6.
