= The Waistcoat =

1882 short story by Bolesław Prus

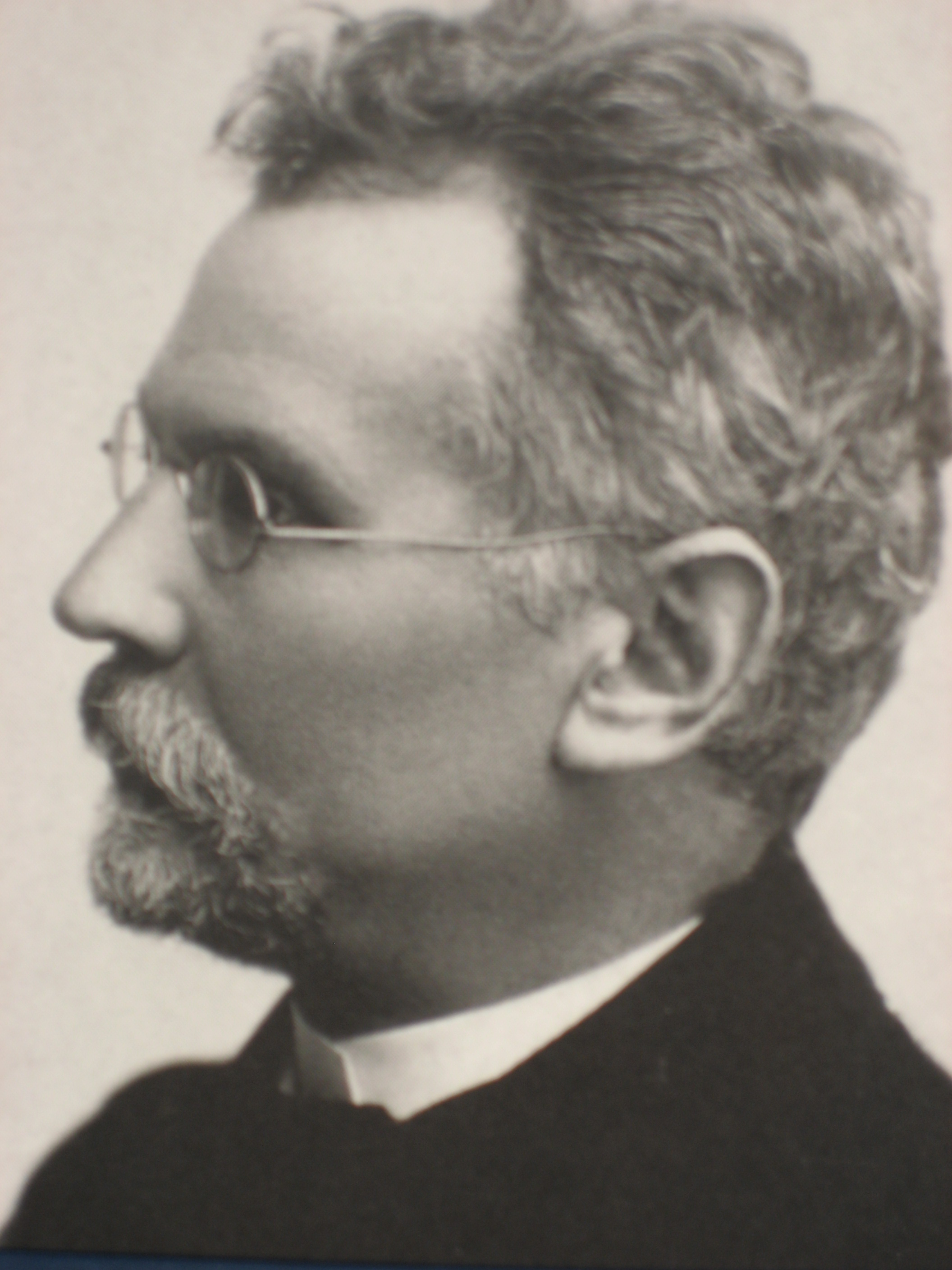
Bolesław Prus

"The Waistcoat" ("Kamizelka") is an 1882 short story by the Polish writer Bolesław Prus, and is considered a masterpiece of short-story writing. It is a sketch of everyday life of impoverished Warsaw residents. The narrator, the title waistcoat's current owner, reconstructs its history, based on his observations of the lives of its original owner and his wife. The story has been translated into Czech, English, French, German, Hebrew, Italian, Russian, and Slovak.

The first English translation was done in 1930-1931 by N. B. Jopson. Others include the 1955 translation by Olga Scherer-Virski and Ilona Ralf Sues in 1960.

== Plot ==
The story is contemporary with its author and plays out in an old Warsaw tenement building. All the action takes place within an enclosed space: the narrator is, as it were, a viewer in a movie theater, whose screen is his neighbors' window across the courtyard.

For sentimental reasons, the narrator purchases the waistcoat (vest) of the story's title for half a ruble from a Jewish peddler; it had belonged to the narrator's neighbor. It is faded in front, bears many stains, is threadbare in back, is missing buttons, and has two bands: one, shortened and sewn on, with a clasp; the other, with piercings from the first band's clasp. The vest is in a sorry state from its earlier use, and recalls the previous owner's sad story.

The couple to whom the vest had belonged, had moved into the Warsaw tenement in early April. They would rise early in the morning, drink tea brewed in a samovar, and leave together for work: she to the school where she taught, he to the office where he worked. They were gentle young people. The wife was slim and was a part-time seamstress; the husband was sturdy and hard-working, often staying at work till late in the night. Every Sunday they would go out for a walk and return in the evening. In April they were living with a servant girl, from July they were alone, and in October only the wife remained, as her husband had died of the tuberculosis that had been diagnosed by a physician during a home visit. As the husband had been losing weight, he had been shortening one of the vest's bands in order not to worry his wife; and she had been shortening the other one in order to give him hope. Thus they had deceived one another in a good cause. After her husband's death, the woman had left town.

== See also ==
- Rear Window, a 1954 Alfred Hitchcock film, starring James Stewart, Grace Kelly, and Raymond Burr, which features a similar conceit of observing neighbors' windows in an apartment building.
