= The Barrel Organ =

1880 short story by Bolesław Prus

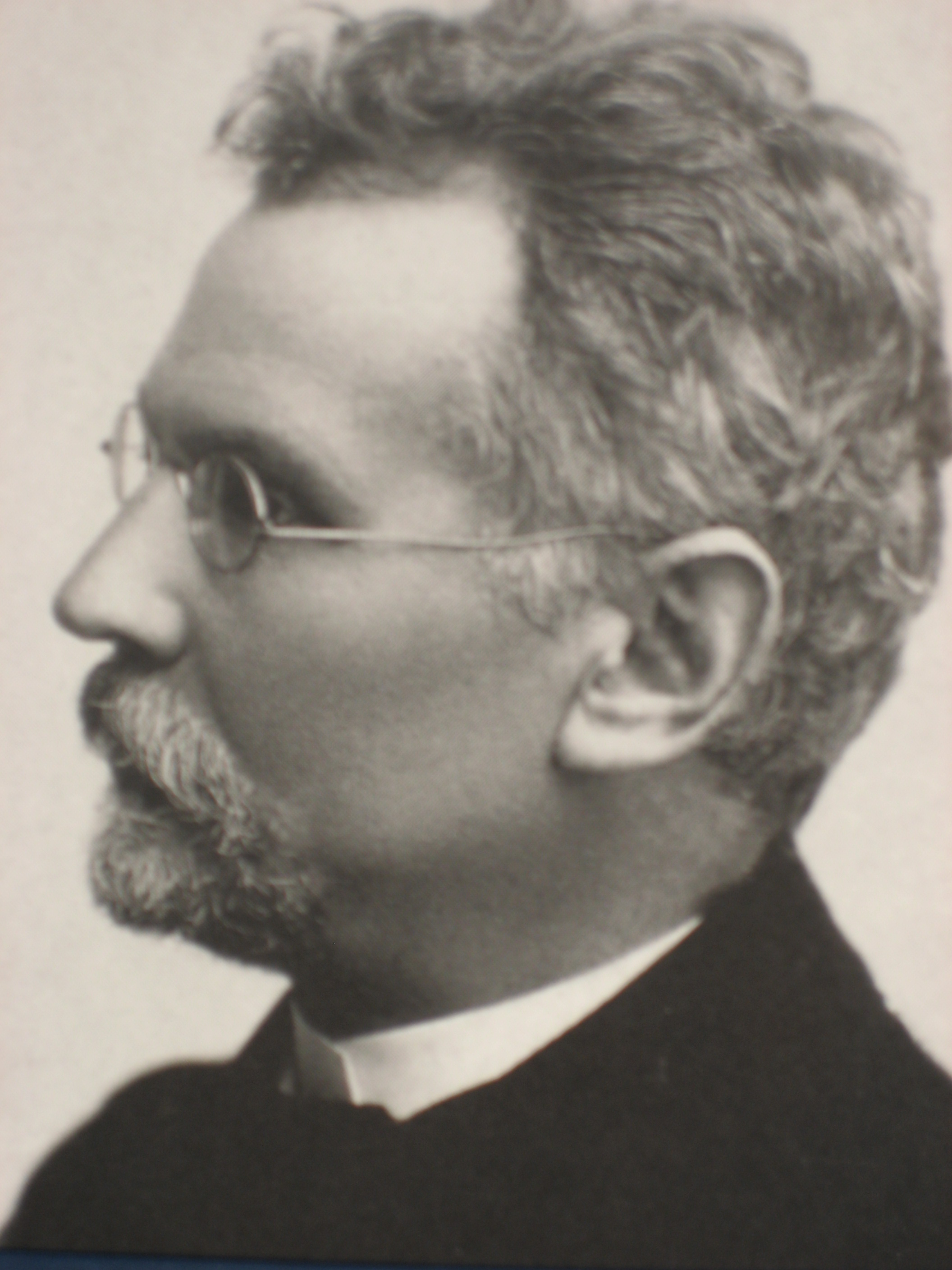
Bolesław Prus

The Barrel Organ ("Katarynka" in Polish) is an 1880 short story by the Polish writer Bolesław Prus.

== Plot ==
Mr. Tomasz (this is his given name, "Thomas" in English) is a middle-aged gentleman who lives adjacent to Warsaw's Old Town. He is always neatly dressed and is endowed with a good sense of taste. Around midday, he walks from Krasiński Square to Senatorska Street, as he has been doing for 30 years. As a young man, Tomasz was a spontaneous and sociable attorney. He dedicated his days to two passions, work and women. Though he had many lady friends, he never married; Instead, he grew increasingly interested in high culture. He is now retired and is still alone. His apartment holds an impressive collection of art and furniture; he is very rich but has no women friends.

Tomasz has one aversion: he cannot stand the sound of a barrel organ. His aversion is so extreme that he pays the porter to keep organ grinders out of the courtyard.

One day Tomasz discovers that a blind eight-year-old girl has moved into an opposite flat with her mother and the mother's friend. Tomasz feels intrigued by the little girl's odd behavior. Then he realizes she is blind. The child’s affliction shocks him.

The narration shifts to the life of the girl and her mother since the girl's loss of vision. It has been one of fairly happy moments spent in their old flat.

One day, as Tomasz is busy working, he ignores his daily routines, even forgetting to instruct the new porter not to let organ grinders into the courtyard. He is very upset on hearing the sounds of a barrel organ. But when he gets up in order to chase the organ grinder away, he sees the little girl in the opposite window enjoying the music's metallic tones. She likes listening to melodies played by organ grinders. Tomasz finds himself yielding to her charm and, in turn, to the barrel-organ music. He now pays the porter to let organ grinders in every day. He also decides to support the girl's medical treatment. In the final scene, he sets out to the eye doctor with a new life goal: to help the little girl and her mother.

== Characters ==
- Mr Tomasz – the short story's main character, a solitary retired attorney, connoisseur of art, owner of a collection of rare trinkets and stylish furniture. He enjoys leading a quiet life, writing letters, giving legal counsel, and taking walks in the city. He finds himself attracted to the little girl who moves into the opposite flat. He later decides to help her and her mother as much as he can.
- Blind girl – the 8-year-old neighbor girl. Despite her disability, she is curious about the world. The quiet, calm courtyard of her new apartment building takes away her smile. But she is drawn out of her isolation by barrel-organ music and Mr. Tomasz's kind heart.
- Blind girl’s mother – almost absent from the short story, she is young and caring, and works at home as a seamstress.
