= The New Woman =

1894 novel by Bolesław Prus

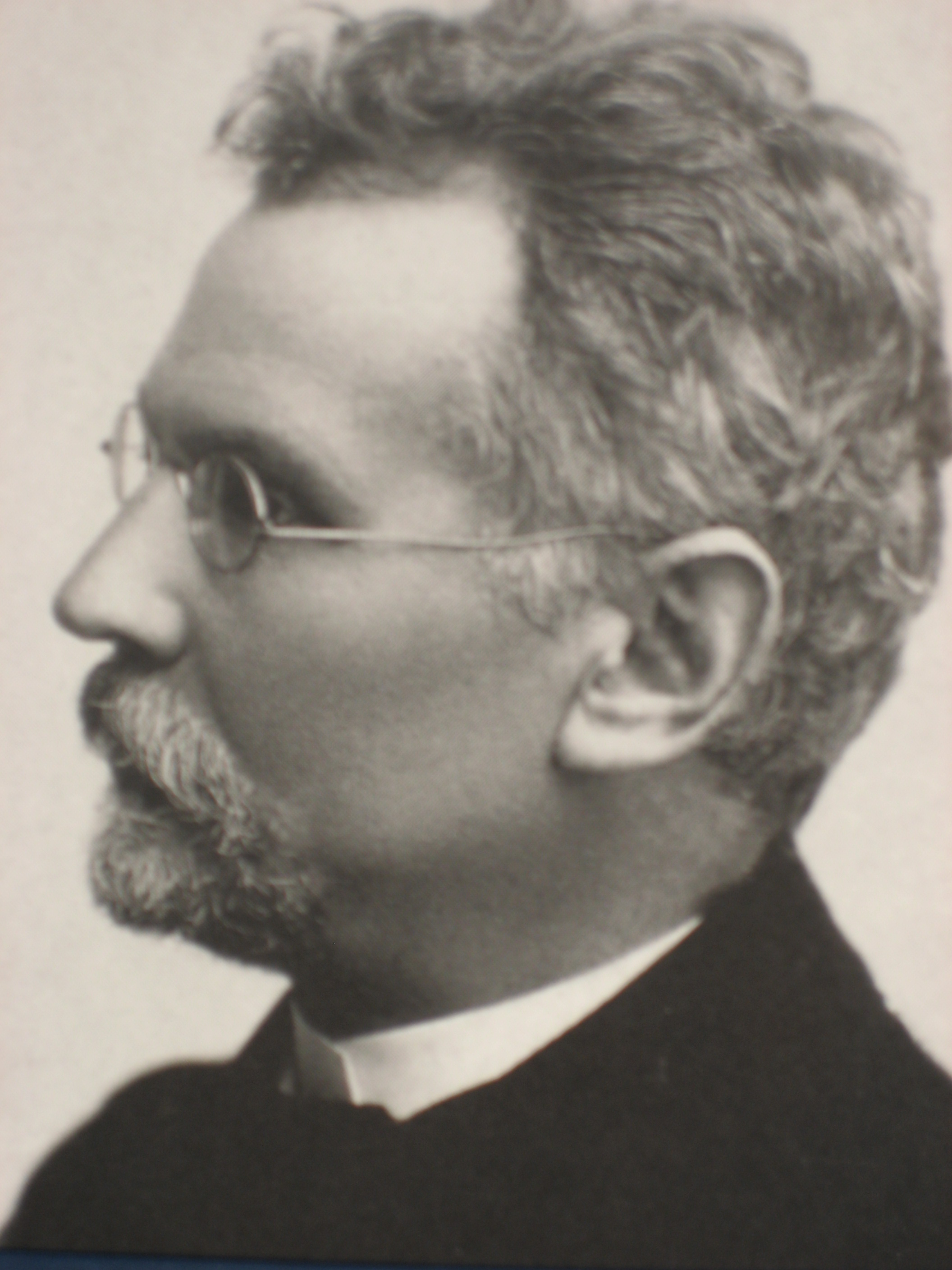
Bolesław Prus

The New Woman (Polish: Emancypantki) is the third of four major novels by the Polish writer Bolesław Prus. It was composed, and appeared in newspaper serialization, in 1890-93, and dealt with societal questions involving feminism.

== History ==
The New Woman, written in 1890–93, first appeared serially in the Warsaw Kurier Codzienny (Daily Courier). Its first book publication followed in 1894.

== Plot ==
The novel takes place in late-1800s Warsaw in the small fictional settlement of Iksinów. The main character is Magdalena Brzeska, who attends a progressive boarding school for girls run by forward-thinking schoolmistress Emma Latter. Magdalena later, as an adult, establishes her own girls' boarding school to continue sharing progressive ideas with future generations of students.

The novel's central ideas focus on the changing role of women in society and on their desire for independence.

== Characters ==
=== Main ===
- Magdalena (Madzia) Brzeska - Often referred to as Madzia, she is an 18-year old woman who is the central character of the novel. A teacher at Ms. Latter's boarding school, she is friendly, soft-hearted, and loved by all the students and teachers for her kindness. As a child she attended Ms. Latter's boarding school, and was inspired by her progressive teachings of self-sufficiency and independence, but as time goes on she is forced to realize that Ms. Latter is not as perfect nor progressive as she grew up to believe. Madzia is from a conservative middle-class family that values education, though they still expect her to focus on marrying into a good family rather than pursue a career. Due to this clash of personal desire and familial expectation, she has not visited her family in seven years. She later opens her own boarding school for girls and formally pursue a career in education.
- Ms. Emma Latter - A stern and beautiful schoolmistress in her forties who oversees the boarding school where Magdalena—once her pupil—now teaches under her. She is considered a widow, and has two grown children, Helena and Kazimierz, from her first marriage. She provided Madzia a strong education and emotional support as a child, leaving a significant impact on Madzia's ambitions and perspectives into adulthood. Ms. Latter's school emphasizes female empowerment and independence, concepts considered novel for the era. Despite this, Ms. Latter is a hypocrite and has antiquated ideals and habits in her personal life: openly favoring and spoiling her son Kazimierz despite his problematic behaviors, not providing her daughter Helena with the same opportunities or luxuries as her son, fostering extreme pay disparity among her staff, and issuing unfair rules and punishments based on what benefits her personally. She is also not above using her beauty and gender as a way to request favors, but chastises other women for doing the same. Due to the controversial progressive topics taught at her school, she faces criticism and scrutiny from conservative members of society, and often struggles to maintain funding. The stress eventually takes a toll on her health, and, along with an increase in criticism, scandals in her personal life, and a decline in funding, she is forced to close her school.
- Helena Norska - Ms. Latter's beautiful and prideful daughter, and Ada's best friend. She has a sibling rivalry with Kazimierz due to the disparity in freedom and financial support Ms. Latter gives him, and often clashes with Kaz regarding his conservative views about women's roles in society. Helena does not follow an interest in education like her mother, and instead dreams of marrying a rich man to fund her dreams of a lavish lifestyle. Although Ms. Latter does not favor Helena, Helena remains empathetic of her mother's financial troubles and worries about her. She is popular and extremely flirtatious, always keeping an eye open for a rich man to settle down with, and at one point attempts to woo Ada's brother Stefan solely for his money. Unfortunately her extremely flirtatious nature causes scandal for both herself and Ms. Latter.
- Kazimierz (Kaz) Norski - Often referred to as Kaz, he is Ms. Latter's handsome, spoiled 25-year-old playboy son from her first marriage, and Helena's older brother. Kaz is openly favored by Ms. Latter, who often covers for his various scandals. He flirts with many of the school teachers, even causing rivalries between them. He secretly has a gambling addiction and often loans money from Ms. Latter's high society friends, which later affects her credit and reputation as she attempts to secure funding for her school. Ms. Latter finally loses patience with Kaz and sends him abroad after she hears rumors that he may have impregnated one of her unmarried teachers during a brief affair. He is initially dismissive towards Ada, but over time he comes to respect her for her determination and intelligence, and eventually falls in love with her.
- Ada Solska - A rich but humble orphan around Madzia's age who resides at Ms. Latter's boarding school, even though she has already graduated. She is a bookish, intelligent woman who loves science and provides Ms. Latter's school with her personal collection of lab equipment for use. She is very close with her older brother, Stefan. Ada is uninterested in living a domestic life, and instead pursues a career in education. Although she has low self-esteem, she openly supports many feminist initiatives, and advocates for education reforms geared towards the empowerment of female students. Her best friend is Helena, despite their opposite personalities and Helena's frequent disregard of her needs as a friend. Despite this, Ada is generous with her money and does not mind supporting Helena's needs.
- Stefan Solski - Ada's quiet and intelligent older brother who travels a lot for work and networking. Multiple characters in the novel describe him as being ugly ("brzydki"), but he is well-respected for his kindness and societal status. Though the siblings are already rich from the inheritance left by their parents, Stefan is shown to be a hard worker with dreams of becoming a businessman. He is very close with Ada and often worries about her happiness and well-being. He is immune to Helena's beauty and instead feels wary about her flirtatious nature and treatment of Ada, preferring Madzia instead. Although he has mutual respect for Madzia, their class differences and societal expectations cause tensions in their relationship, and Madzia rejects his marriage proposal near the end of the novel.

== Film ==
In 1982, the novel was adapted as a Polish feature film, Pensja Pani Latter (Mrs. Latter's Boarding School).

== See also ==
- List of feminist literature

== Sources ==
- Czesław Miłosz, The History of Polish Literature, New York, Macmillan, 1969.
- Edward Pieścikowski, Bolesław Prus, 2nd edition, Warsaw, Państwowe Wydawnictwo Naukowe, 1985.
- Zygmunt Szweykowski, Twórczość Bolesława Prusa (The Art of Bolesław Prus), 2nd edition, Warsaw, Państwowy Instytut Wydawniczy, 1972.
