= Statue of Bolesław Prus =

Monument in Warsaw, Poland

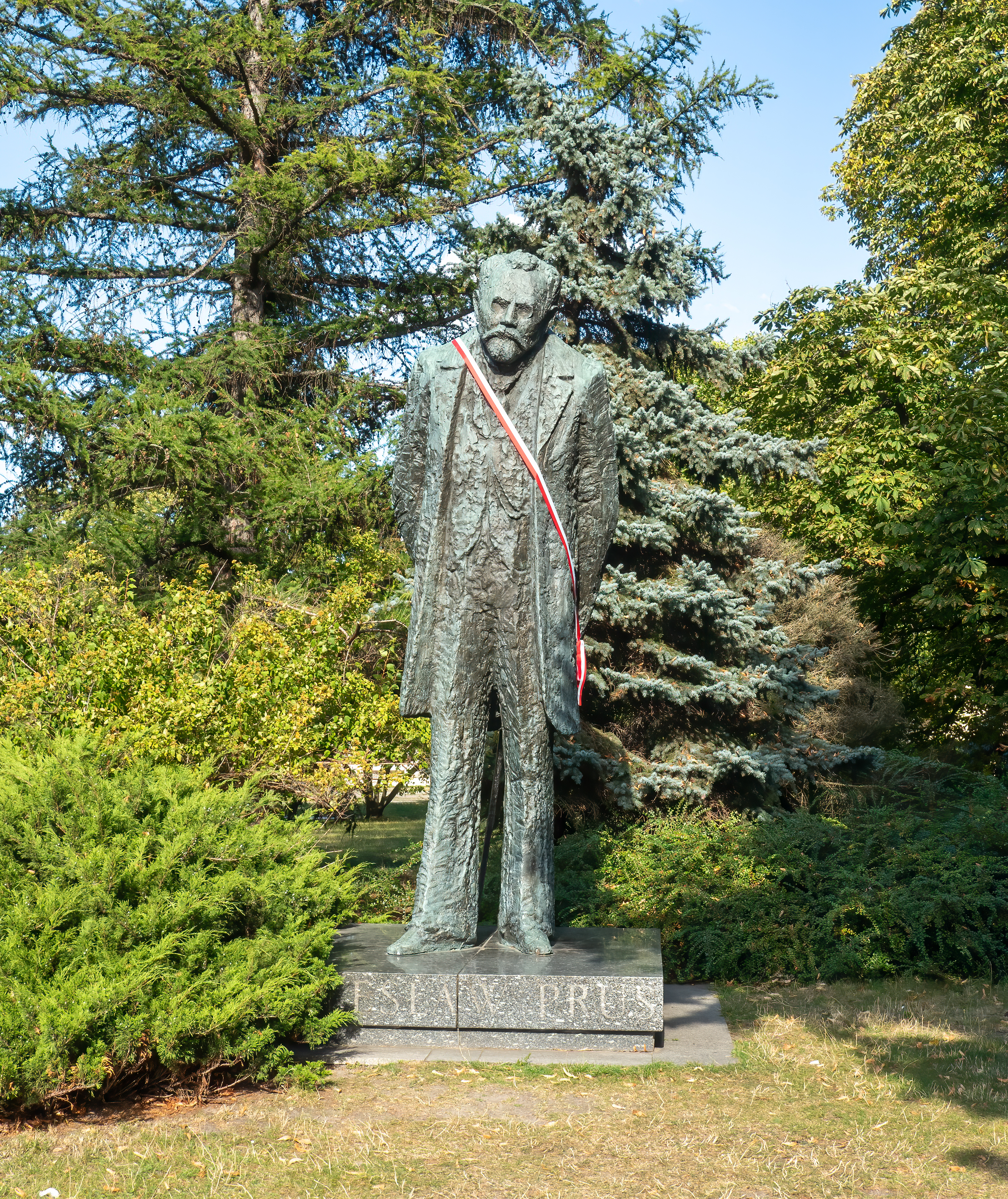
- The monument in 2024
- Interactive map of Statue of Bolesław Prus
- Location: Twardowski Square, Downtown, Warsaw, Poland
- Coordinates: 52°14′30.22″N 21°00′58.91″E
- Designer: Anna Kamieńska-Łapińska
- Type: Statue
- Material: bronze (statue); granite (pedestal)
- Height: 3.6 m (12 ft)
- Opening date: 15 January 1977
- Dedicated to: Bolesław Prus

The statue of Bolesław Prus (Polish pronunciation: [bɔˈlεs.waf ˈprus]; Polish: Pomnik Bolesława Prusa) is a bronze statue of Bolesław Prus in Warsaw, Poland, located in the Downtown district on Twardowski Square, near the intersection of Krakowskie Przedmieście and Karowa Streets.

Prus was a 19th- and 20th-century Polish Positivist journalist and novelist, and a leading figure in the history of Polish literature and philosophy.

The monument, designed by Anna Kamieńska-Łapińska, was unveiled on 15 January 1977.

== History ==
The monument is dedicated to Bolesław Prus, a 19th- and 20th-century novelist, and a leading figure in the history of Polish literature and philosophy. It was first proposed in 1916 in the magazine Tygodnik Illustrowany. The idea was revisited in the early 1960s, in the radio drama The Matysiaks. Money for its construction was donated by Warsaw artisans.

In 1962 four teams of artists were awarded in a contest for the monument's design. However, none of these designs was used. Instead Anna Kamieńska-Łapińska was commissioned to create a new design. The monument was unveiled on 15 January 1977.

== Description ==
The monument is located on Twardowski Square, near the intersection of Krakowskie Przedmieście and Karowa Streets. Before the Second World War, at this site stood a building that housed the presses of Kurier Warszawski, a newspaper for which Bolesław Prus wrote.

The monument is a bronze statue 3.6 meters tall (over twice-lifesize), standing on a low granite pedestal. The monument depicts Bolesław Prus as an elderly man in a pensive pose, holding a cane behind his back.
