= Anna Kamieńska-Łapińska =

Polish sculptor

Anna Kamieńska-Łapińska (Rowiny, Drohiczyn Poleski County, 26 July 1932 – 29 June 2007, Warsaw) was a Polish sculptor and animated-film scenarist.

== Life ==
In 1952–58 she studied in the Sculpture Department of the Warsaw Academy of Fine Arts with Professor Jerzy Jarnuszkiewicz. On 15 June 1958 she obtained a diploma with distinction. From the 1960s she participated in many Polish and foreign exhibitions.

== Work ==
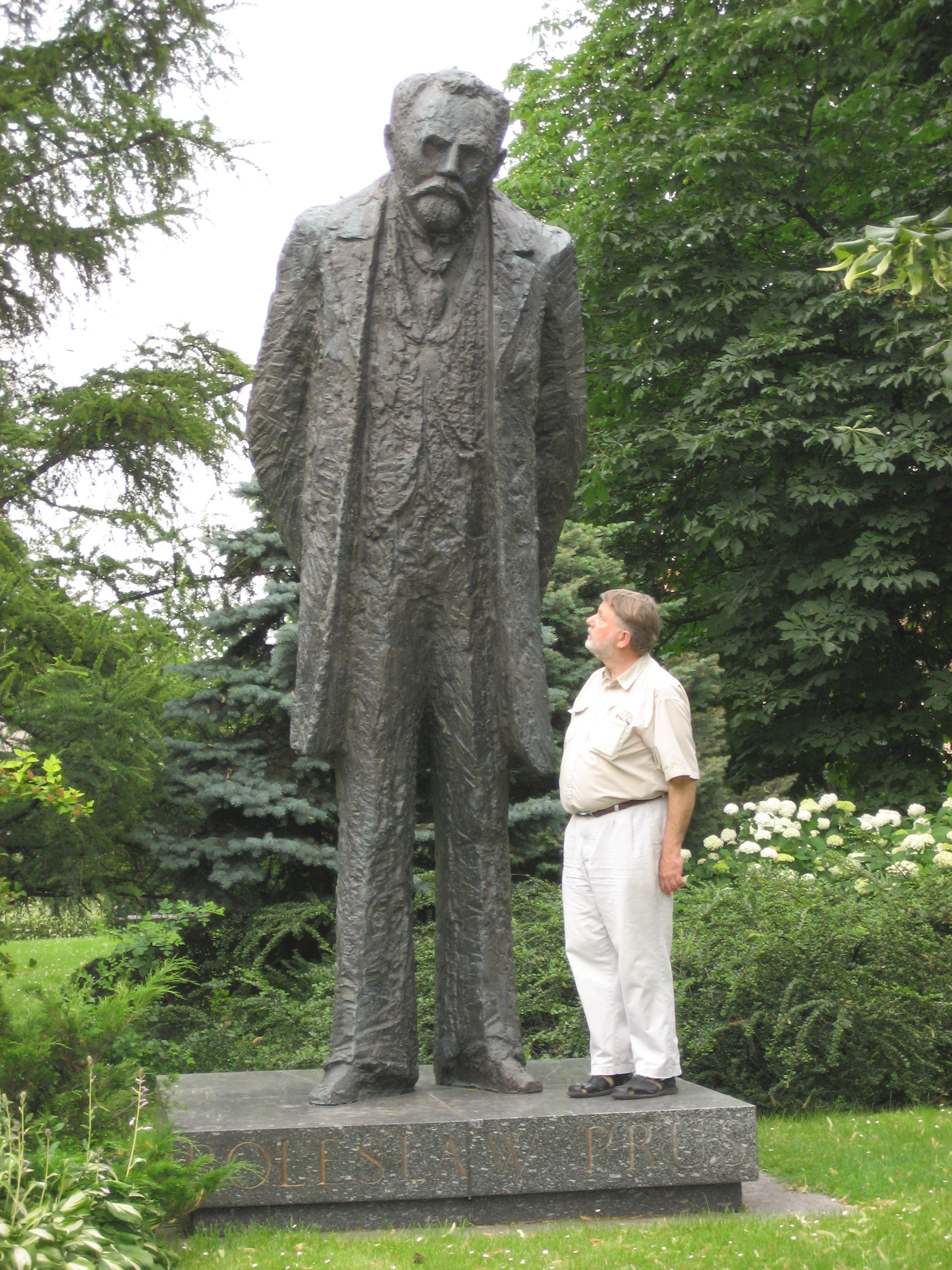
Anna Kamieńska-Łapińska's statue of Bolesław Prus on Warsaw's Krakowskie Przedmieście, erected in 1977

Her work may be classified as belonging to biological expressionism. She worked principally in small sculptural forms, in the media of ceramics, aluminum, bronze and cast iron. In the 1960s her chief subject was the natural world and its transformations—cycles of insects, lichens, corals, trees.

Ensuing years brought an interest in the human figure and scenes from everyday life. In 1963 she took third place in a competition for a Monument to the Heroes of Westerplatte.

In 1977 she co-authored a winning design for a monument to Bolesław Prus. The sculpture was executed in Warsaw in 1977.

== Sculpture cycles ==
- Moths—ceramic, 1965
- Crabs—ceramic, 1968–70
- Insects—ceramic, bronze, cast iron, 1969–80
- Nuns—ceramic, 1975–80
- Tables—ceramic, aluminum, 1974
- Remembered scenes—ceramic, aluminum, 1974
- Crowd portraits—ceramic, aluminum, 1975–85
- Sculptures to fairy tales by Hans Christian Andersen–porcelain, 1988

== See also ==
- List of Poles
