= Alina Ślesińska =

Polish sculptor (1922–1994)

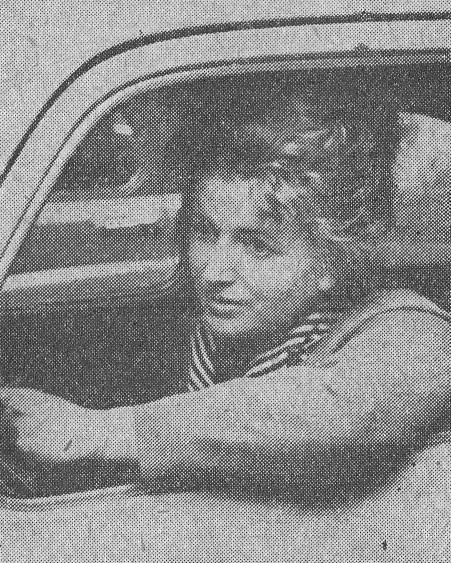
- Born: 1922
- Died: 1994 (aged 71–72)

Alina Ślesińska (1922 – 1994) was a Polish sculptor.
