= Zygmunt Szweykowski (historian) =

Polish historian (1894-1978)

Zygmunt Szweykowski (7 April 1894 – 11 February 1978) was a historian of Polish literature who specialized in 19th-century Polish prose.

== Life ==
Zygmunt Szweykowski was born on 7 April 1894 in Krośniewice. In 1932–39, Szweykowski held a professorship at the Free Polish University (Wolna Wszechnica Polska) in Warsaw and Łódź. He was the father of musicologist Zygmunt Szweykowski.

During the World War II Nazi occupation of Poland, he participated, at the risk of his life, in underground university teaching in Warsaw.

From 1946 he held a chair at Poznań University. In 1950 he was inducted into the Polish Academy of Learning, and in 1951 into the Polish Academy of Sciences. He died on 11 February 1978 in Poznań.

Szweykowski studied the 19th-century Polish novel. His books in this field included Powieści historyczne Henryka Rzewuskiego (The Historical Novels of Henryk Rzewuski, 1922) and Trylogia Sienkiewicza (Sienkiewicz's Trilogy, 1961).

His specialty, however, was the writings of Bolesław Prus. His books on Prus include Tworczość Bolesława Prusa (The Art of Bolesław Prus, 1947; 2nd ed., 1972) and Nie tylko o Prusie: szkice (Not Only about Prus: Sketches, 1967).

Beginning in 1948, Szweykowski produced monumental editions of Prus' collected Pisma (Writings). He also edited Krystyna Tokarzówna's and Stanisław Fita's exhaustive Bolesław Prus, 1847-1912: Kalendarz życia i twórczości (Bolesław Prus, 1847-1912: a Calendar of [His] Life and Work), Warsaw, Państwowy Instytut Wydawniczy, 1969.

== Works ==
- Powieści historyczne Henryka Rzewuskiego (The Historical Novels of Henryk Rzewuski, 1922)
- "Lalka" Bolesława Prusa (Bolesław Prus' The Doll, 1927)
- Twórczość Bolesława Prusa (The Creative Writing of Bolesław Prus, 1947, 1972)
- "Trylogia" Henryka Sienkiewicza. Szkice (Henryk Sienkiewicz's Trilogy: Sketches, 1961)
- Nie tylko o Prusie (Not Only about Prus, 1967)
- "Trylogia" Sienkiewicza i inne szkice o twórczości pisarza (Sienkiewicz's Trilogy and Other Sketches about the Writer's Works, 1973)
