= Pharaoh (Prus novel) =

1895 novel by Bolesław Prus

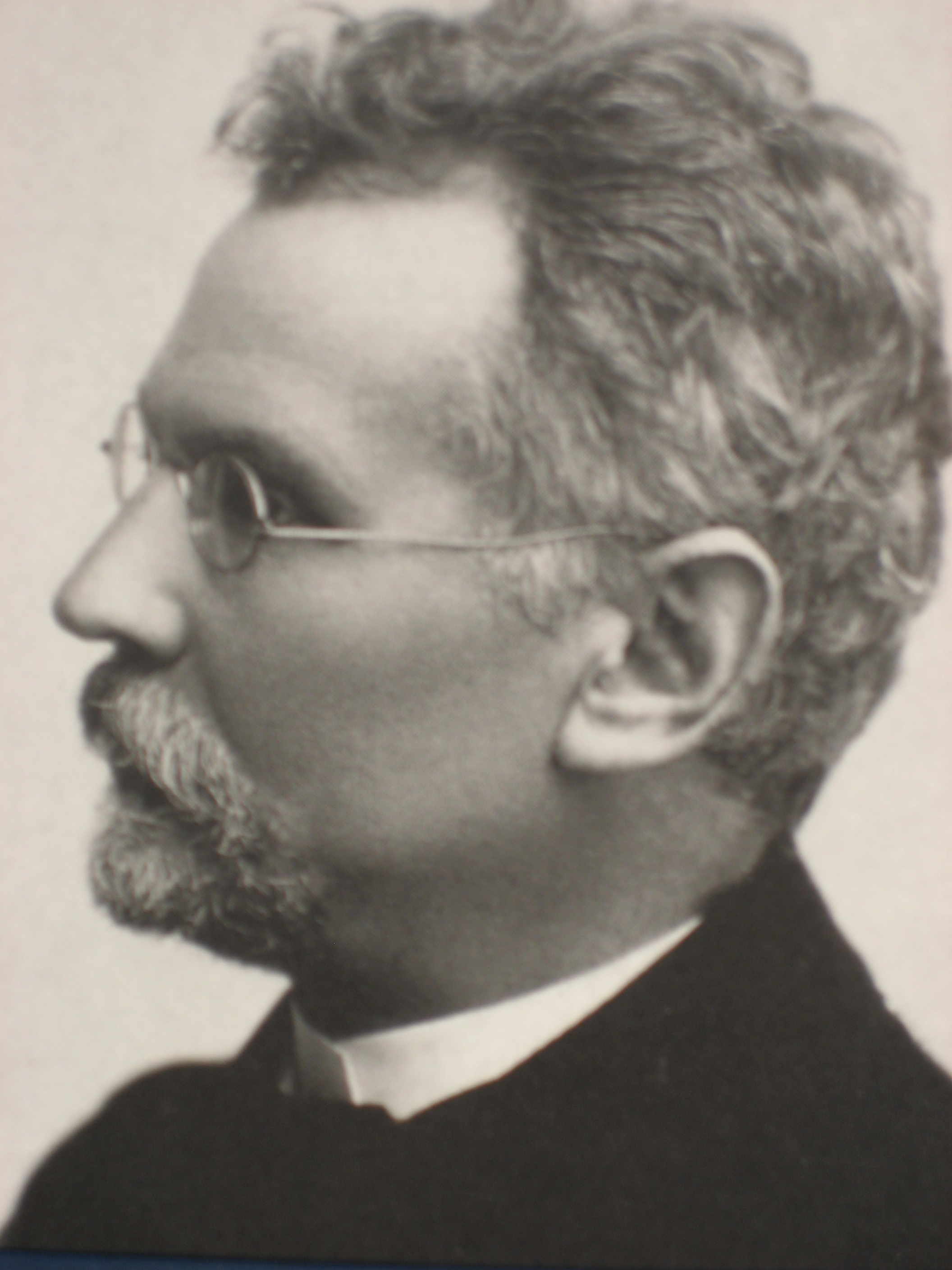
- Bolesław Prus (1887)
- Author: Bolesław Prus
- Original title: Faraon
- Language: Polish
- Genre: Historical novel
- Publisher: Tygodnik Ilustrowany (Illustrated Weekly); Gebethner i Wolff (book)
- Publication date: 1895 (Illustrated Weekly); 1897 (book edition)
- Publication place: Poland
- Media type: Newspaper, hardback, paperback
- Preceded by: The Outpost, The Doll, A Legend of Old Egypt, The New Woman
- Original text: Faraon at Polish Wikisource

Pharaoh (Polish: Faraon) is the fourth and last major novel by the Polish writer Bolesław Prus (1847–1912). Composed over a year's time in 1894–95, serialized in 1895–96, and published in book form in 1897, it was the sole historical novel by an author who had earlier disapproved of historical novels on the ground that they inevitably distort history.

Pharaoh has been described by Czesław Miłosz as a "novel on... mechanism[s] of state power and, as such, ... probably unique in world literature of the nineteenth century.... Prus, [in] selecting the reign of 'Pharaoh Ramses XIII' [a fictitious character] in the eleventh century BCE, sought a perspective that was detached from... pressures of [topicality] and censorship. Through his analysis of the dynamics of an ancient Egyptian society, he... suggest[s] an archetype of the struggle for power that goes on within any state."

Pharaoh is set in the Egypt of 1087–85 BCE as that country experiences internal stresses and external threats that will culminate in the fall of its Twentieth Dynasty and New Kingdom. The young protagonist Ramses learns that those who would challenge the powers that be are vulnerable to co-option, seduction, subornation, defamation, intimidation and assassination. Perhaps the chief lesson, belatedly absorbed by Ramses as pharaoh, is the importance, to power, of knowledge.

Prus' vision of the fall of an ancient civilization derives some of its power from the author's keen awareness of the final demise of the Polish–Lithuanian Commonwealth in 1795, a century before the completion of the novel.

Preparatory to writing Pharaoh, Prus immersed himself in ancient Egyptian history, geography, customs, religion, art and writings. In the course of telling his story of power, personality, and the fates of nations, he produced a compelling literary depiction of life at every level of ancient Egyptian society. Further, he offers a vision of humankind as rich as Shakespeare's, ranging from the sublime to the quotidian, from the tragic to the comic. The book is written in limpid prose and is imbued with poetry, leavened with humor, graced with moments of transcendent beauty.

Pharaoh has been translated into twenty-four languages and adapted as a 1966 Polish feature film. It is also known to have been Joseph Stalin's favorite book.

From May 2024, a manuscript copy of the novel is presented at a permanent exhibition in the Palace of the Commonwealth in Warsaw.

== Publication ==
Pharaoh comprises a compact, substantial introduction; sixty-seven chapters; and an evocative epilogue (the latter omitted at the book's original publication, and restored in the 1950s). Like Prus' previous novels, Pharaoh debuted (1895–96) in newspaper serialization—in the Warsaw Tygodnik Ilustrowany (Illustrated Weekly). It was dedicated "To my wife, Oktawia Głowacka, née Trembińska, as a small token of esteem and affection."

Unlike the author's earlier novels, Pharaoh had first been composed in its entirety, rather than being written in chapters from issue to issue. This may account for its often being described as Prus' "best-composed novel"—indeed, "one of the best-composed Polish novels."

The original 1897 book edition and some subsequent ones divided the novel into three volumes. Later editions have presented it in two volumes or in a single one. Except in wartime, the book has never been out of print in Poland.

A 2014 edition of Faraon, in Poland, is furnished by Andrzej Niwiński, professor of Egyptian archaeology at the University of Warsaw, with extensive annotations. Though Prus was not a historian and, apart from Pharaoh, wrote no other historical novel, it is regarded as superior to any other novel on ancient Egypt. From available sources, Prus drew information and authentic ancient texts and worked them, as vital elements, into his masterpiece. Regardless of occasional anachronisms, anatopisms, and errors in description of some realia, the novel has well stood the test of time. In spite of translations into many languages, however, it still remains little known in the wider world.

== Plot ==
Pharaoh begins with one of the more memorable openings in a novel — an opening written in the style of an ancient chronicle:

In the thirty-third year of the happy reign of Ramses XII, Egypt celebrated two events that filled her loyal inhabitants with pride and joy.

In the month of Mechir, in December, there returned to Thebes laden with sumptuous gifts the god Khonsu, who had traveled three years and nine months in the land of Bukhten, restoring to health the local king's daughter named Bent-res and exorcising the evil spirit not only from the king's family but even from the fortress of Bukhten.

And in the month of Pharmouthi, in February, the Lord of Upper and Lower Egypt, the ruler of Phoenicia and of the nine nations, Mer-amen-Ramses XII, after consulting the gods, to whom he is equal, named as his Successor to the Throne his twenty-two-year-old son Ham-sem-merer-amen-Ramses.

This choice delighted the pious priests, eminent nomarchs, valiant army, faithful people and all creatures living on Egyptian soil. For the Pharaoh's elder sons, born of the Hittite princess, had, due to spells that could not be investigated, been visited by an evil spirit. One, twenty-seven years old, had been unable to walk from his majority; another had cut his veins and died; and the third, after drinking tainted wine that he had been unwilling to give up, had gone mad and, fancying himself an ape, spent days on end in the trees.

The fourth son Ramses, however, born of Queen Nikotris, daughter of High Priest Amenhotep, was strong as the Apis bull, brave as a lion and wise as the priests....

Pharaoh combines features of several literary genres: the historical novel, the political novel, the Bildungsroman, the utopian novel, the sensation novel. It also comprises a number of interbraided strands — including the plot line, Egypt's cycle of seasons, the country's geography and monuments, and ancient Egyptian practices (e.g. mummification rituals and techniques) — each of which rises to prominence at appropriate moments.

Much as in an ancient Greek tragedy, the fate of the novel's protagonist, the future "Ramses XIII," is known from the beginning. Prus closes his introduction with the statement that the narrative "relates to the eleventh century before Christ, when the Twentieth Dynasty fell and when, after the demise of the Son of the Sun the eternally living Ramses XIII, the throne was seized by, and the uraeus came to adorn the brow of, the eternally living Son of the Sun Sem-amen-Herhor, High Priest of Amon." What the novel will subsequently reveal is the elements that lead to this denouement—the character traits of the principals, the social forces in play.

Ancient Egypt at the end of its New Kingdom period is experiencing adversities. The deserts are eroding Egypt's arable land. The country's population has declined from eight to six million. Foreign peoples are entering Egypt in ever-growing numbers, undermining its unity. The chasm between the peasants and craftsmen on one hand, and the ruling classes on the other, is growing, exacerbated by the ruling elites' fondness for luxury and idleness. The country is becoming ever more deeply indebted to Phoenician merchants, as imported goods destroy native industries.

The Egyptian priesthood, backbone of the bureaucracy and virtual monopolists of knowledge, have grown immensely wealthy at the expense of the pharaoh and the country. At the same time, Egypt is facing prospective peril at the hands of rising powers to the north — Assyria and Persia.

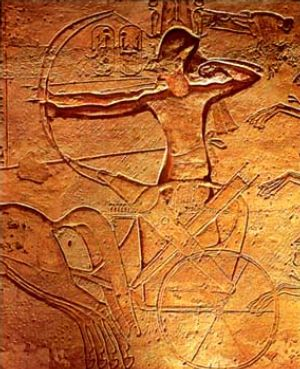
Ramses II ("the Great") at the Battle of Kadesh. (bas relief at Abu Simbel)

The 22-year-old Egyptian crown prince and viceroy Ramses, having made a careful study of his country and of the challenges that it faces, evolves a strategy that he hopes will arrest the decline of his own political power and of Egypt's internal viability and international standing. Ramses plans to win over or subordinate the priesthood, especially the High Priest of Amon, Herhor; obtain for the country's use the treasures that lie stored in the Labyrinth; and, emulating Ramses the Great's military exploits, wage war on Assyria.

Ramses proves himself a brilliant military commander in a victorious lightning war against the invading Libyans. On succeeding to the throne, he encounters the adamant opposition of the priestly hierarchy to his planned reforms. The Egyptian populace is instinctively drawn to Ramses, but he must still win over or crush the priesthood and their adherents.

In the course of the political intrigue, Ramses' private life becomes hostage to the conflicting interests of the Phoenicians and the Egyptian high priests.

Ramses' ultimate downfall is caused by his underestimation of his opponents and by his impatience with priestly obscurantism. Along with the chaff of the priests' myths and rituals, he has inadvertently discarded a crucial piece of scientific knowledge.

Ramses is succeeded to the throne by his arch-enemy Herhor, who paradoxically ends up raising treasure from the Labyrinth to finance the very social reforms that had been planned by Ramses, and whose implementation Herhor and his allies had blocked. But it is too late to arrest the decline of the Egyptian polity and to avert the eventual fall of the Egyptian civilization.

The novel closes with a poetic epilogue that reflects Prus' own path through life. The priest Pentuer, who had declined to betray the priesthood and aid Ramses' campaign to reform the Egyptian polity, mourns Ramses, who like the teenage Prus had risked all to save his country. As Pentuer and his mentor, the sage priest Menes, listen to the song of a mendicant priest, Pentuer says:

"Do you hear? [...] He whose heart no longer beats not only is not saddened by the mourning of others, he does not even take pleasure in his own life, no matter how beautifully sculpted... What for, then, this sculpting for which one pays in pain and bloody tears?..."

Night was falling. Menes wrapped himself in his gaberdine and replied:

"Whenever such thoughts assail you, go to one of our temples and look at its walls crammed with pictures of men, animals, trees, rivers, stars—just like the world we live in.

"For the simple man such figures have no value, and more than one may have asked, what are they for?... why carve them at such great expense of labor?... But the wise man approaches these figures with reverence and, sweeping them with his eye, reads in them the history of distant times or secrets of wisdom."

== Characters ==
Prus took characters' names where he found them, sometimes anachronistically or anatopistically. At other times (as with Nitager, commander of the army that guards the gates of Egypt from attack by Asiatic peoples, in chapter 1 et seq.; and as with the priest Samentu, in chapter 55 et seq.) he apparently invented them. The origins of the names of some prominent characters may be of interest:

- Ramses, the novel's protagonist: the name of two pharaohs of the 19th Dynasty and nine pharaohs of the 20th Dynasty.
- Nikotris, Ramses' mother: semi-historic Sixth Dynasty female pharaoh Nitocris; or the identically named daughter, Nitocris, of the Twenty-sixth Dynasty king Psamtik I.
- Amenhotep, high priest and Ramses' maternal grandfather: name of a number of ancient Egyptians, including four 18th Dynasty pharaohs and the High Priest of Amon under Pharaohs Ramses IX to Ramses XI (the High Priest played a key role in the civil war that ended Egypt's 20th Dynasty and, with it, the New Kingdom).
- Herhor, High Priest of Amon and Ramses' principal antagonist: historic high priest Herihor.
- Pentuer, scribe to Herhor: historic scribe Pentewere (Pentaur); or perhaps Pentawer, a son of Pharaoh Ramses III.
- Thutmose, Ramses' cousin: a fairly common name, also the name of four pharaohs of the 18th Dynasty.
- Sarah, Ramses' Jewish mistress; Taphath, Sarah's relative and servant; Gideon, Sarah's father: names drawn from those of Biblical personalities.
- Patrokles, a Greek mercenary general: Patroclus, in Homer's Iliad.
- Ennana, a junior military officer: Egyptian scribe-pupil's name, attached to an ancient text (cited in Pharaoh, chapter 4: Ennana's "plaint on the sore lot of a junior officer").
- Dagon, a Phoenician merchant: a Phoenician and Philistine god of agriculture and the earth; the national god of the Philistines.
- Tamar, Dagon's wife (chapters 8, 13): Biblical wife of Er, then of his brother Onan; she subsequently had children by their father Judah, eponymous ancestor of the Judeans and Jews.

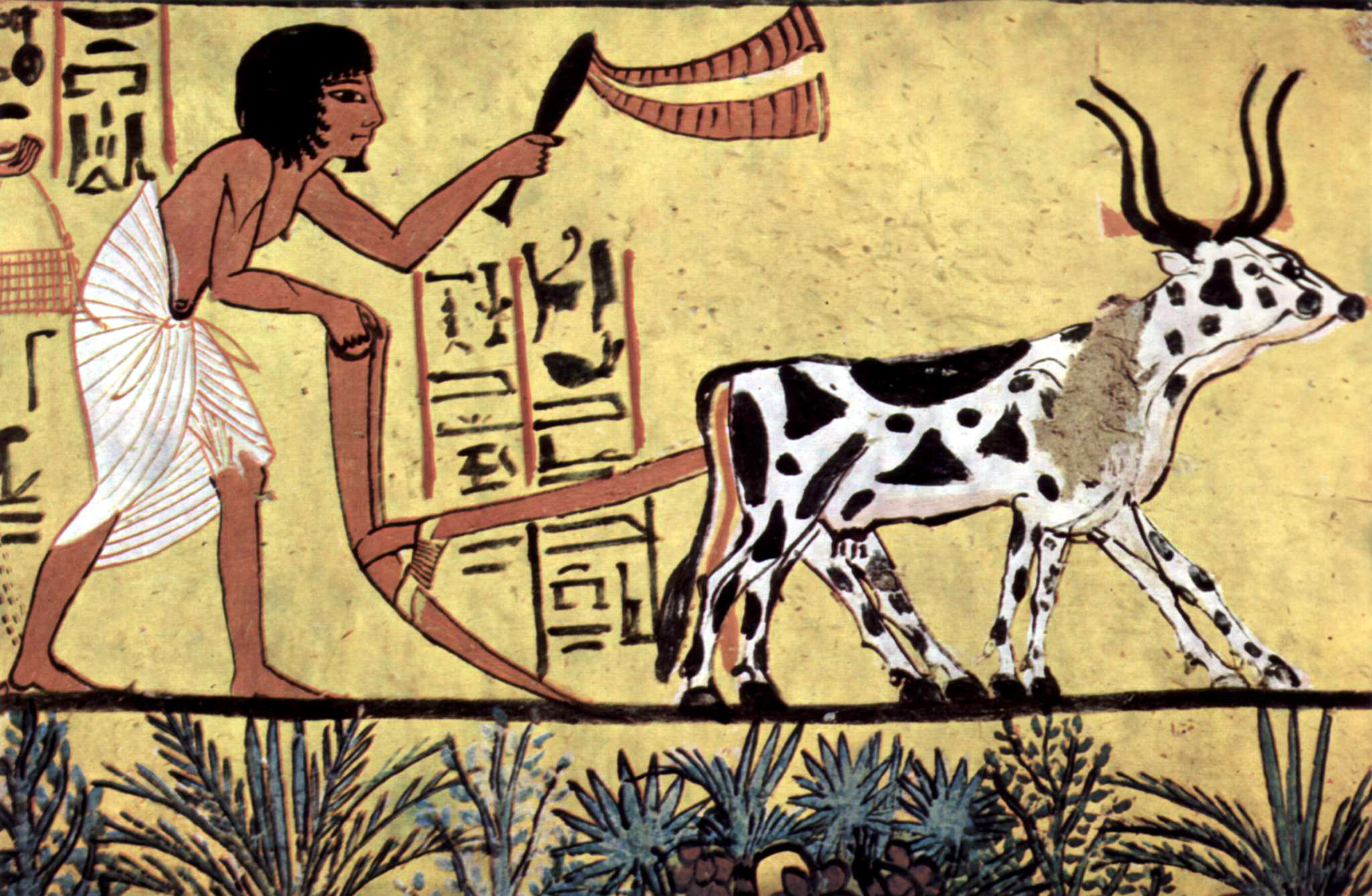
All classes, including peasants, appear in Pharaoh.

- Dutmose, a peasant (chapter 11): historic scribe Dhutmose, in the reign of Pharaoh Ramses XI.
- Menes (three distinct individuals: the first pharaoh; Sarah's physician; a savant and Pentuer's mentor): Menes, the first Egyptian pharaoh.
- Asarhadon, a Phoenician innkeeper: a variant of "Esarhaddon", an Assyrian king.
- Berossus, a Chaldean priest: Berossus, a Babylonian historian and astrologer who flourished about 300 BCE.
- Phut (another name used by Berossus): Phut, a descendant of Noah named in Genesis.
- Cush, a guest at Asarhadon's inn: Cush, a descendant of Noah named in Genesis.
- Mephres, an elderly Egyptian high priest and the most implacable foe of the protagonist, Ramses: an 18th-Dynasty pharaoh, evidently identical with Thutmose I.
- Mentesuphis, a priest aide to Herhor: name given by Manetho to Pharaoh Nemtyemsaf II of the 6th Dynasty.
- Hiram, a Phoenician prince: Hiram I, king of Tyre, in Phoenicia.
- Kama, a Phoenician priestess who becomes Ramses' mistress: Kama, a word in Hindu scriptures, associated variously with sensuality, longing and sexuality.
- Lykon, a young Greek, Ramses' look-alike and nemesis: Lykaon, in the Iliad.
- Sargon, an Assyrian envoy: name of two Assyrian kings. Additionally, the earlier Sargon of Akkad was the first ruler of the Semitic-speaking Akkadian Empire, known for his conquests of the Sumerian city-states in the 24th to 23rd centuries BCE; he was the founder of one of history's first empires.
- Seti, Ramses' infant son by Sarah: name of several ancient Egyptians, including two Pharaohs.
- Osochor, a priest thought (chapter 40) to have sold Egyptian priestly secrets to the Phoenicians: a Meshwesh king who ruled Egypt in the late 21st Dynasty.
- Musawasa, a Libyan prince: the Meshwesh, a Libyan tribe.
- Tehenna, Musawasa's son: "Tehenu", a generic Egyptian term for "Libyan."
- Dion, a Greek architect: Dion, a historic name that appears in a number of contexts.
- Hebron, Ramses' last mistress: Hebron, the largest city in the present-day West Bank.

== Themes ==
Pharaoh belongs to a Polish literary tradition of political fiction whose roots reach back to the 16th century and Jan Kochanowski's play, The Dismissal of the Greek Envoys (1578), and also includes Ignacy Krasicki's Fables and Parables (1779) and Julian Ursyn Niemcewicz's The Return of the Deputy (1790). Pharaoh's story covers a two-year period, ending in 1085 BCE with the demise of the Egyptian Twentieth Dynasty and New Kingdom.

Polish Nobel laureate Czesław Miłosz has written of Pharaoh:

The daring conception of [Prus'] novel Pharaoh... is matched by its excellent artistic composition. It [may] be [described] as a novel on... mechanism[s] of state power and, as such, is probably unique in world literature of the nineteenth century.... Prus, [in] selecting the reign of 'Pharaoh Ramses XIII' [the last Ramesside was actually Ramses XI] in the eleventh century [BCE], sought a perspective that was detached from... pressures of [topicality] and censorship. Through his analysis of the dynamics of an ancient Egyptian society, he... suggest[s] an archetype of the struggle for power that goes on within any state. [Prus] convey[s] certain views [regarding] the health and illness of civilizations.... Pharaoh... is a work worthy of Prus' intellect and [is] one of the best Polish novels.

The perspective of which Miłosz writes, enables Prus, while formulating an ostensibly objective vision of historic Egypt, simultaneously to create a satire on man and society, much as Jonathan Swift in Britain had done the previous century.

Pharaoh's young protagonist, Prince Ramses (who is 22 years old at the novel's opening), learns that those who would oppose the priesthood are "vulnerable to cooption, seduction, subornation, defamation, intimidation, or assassination. Perhaps the chief lesson, belatedly absorbed by [Ramses], is the importance, to power, of knowledge or science."

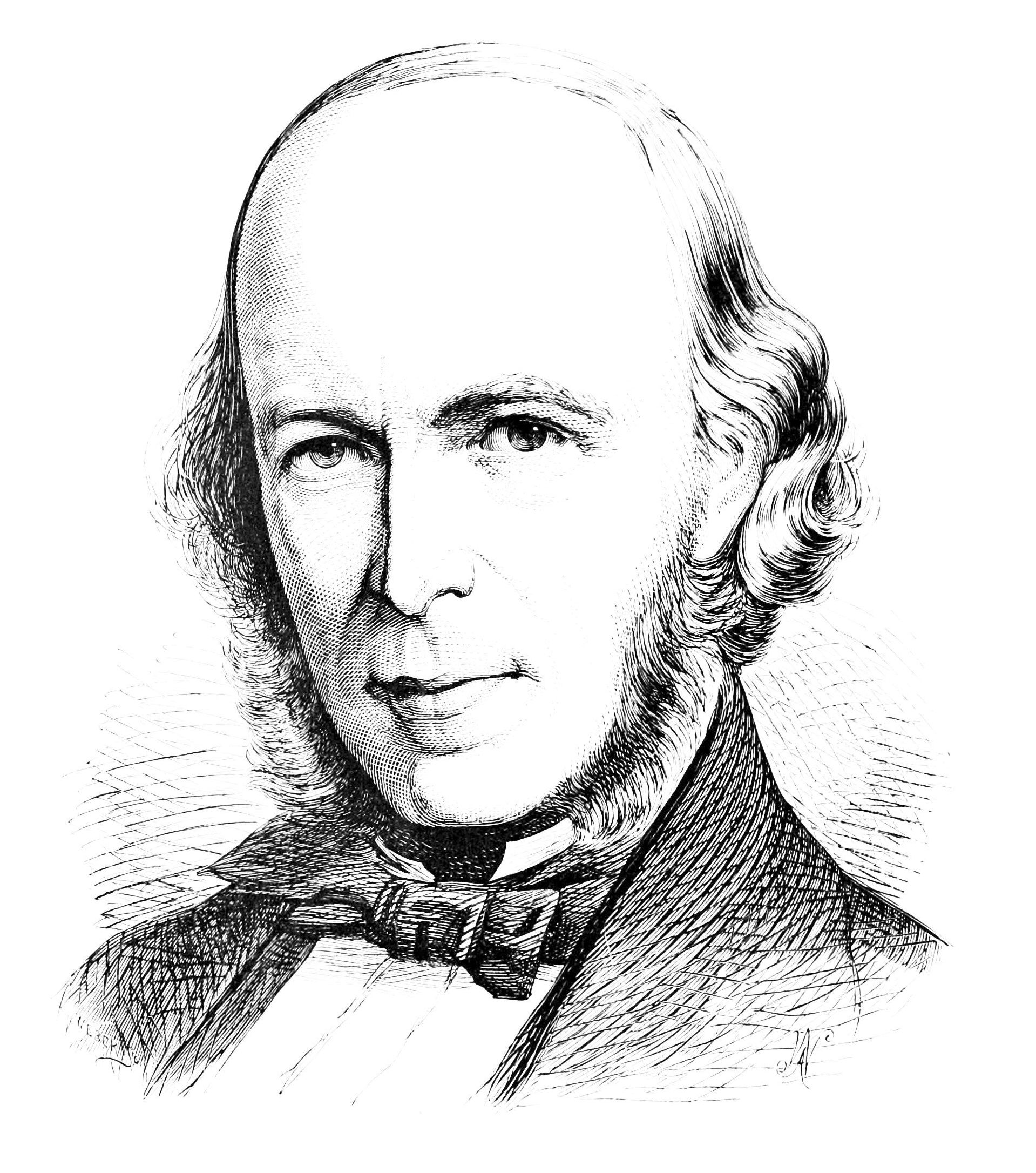
Herbert Spencer saw society as an organism.

As a political novel, Pharaoh became a favorite of Joseph Stalin's; similarities have been pointed out between it and Sergei Eisenstein's film Ivan the Terrible, produced under Stalin's tutelage. Pharaoh is, in a sense, an extended study of the metaphor of society-as-organism that Prus had adopted from English philosopher and sociologist Herbert Spencer, and that Prus makes explicit in the introduction to the novel: "the Egyptian nation in its times of greatness formed, as it were, a single person, in which the priesthood was the mind, the pharaoh was the will, the people the body, and obedience the cement." All of society's organ systems must work together harmoniously, if society is to survive and prosper.

Pharaoh is a study of factors that affect the rise and fall of civilizations.

Egypt developed as long as a homogeneous nation, energetic kings and wise priests worked together for the common good. But there came a time when the populace declined in number in the aftermath of wars and lost their vitality under oppression and extortion, while the influx of foreigners undermined their racial unity. When, in addition, the energy of the pharaohs and the wisdom of the priests were dissipated in a flood of Asian profligacy and these two forces began between them a struggle over the monopoly of fleecing the people, Egypt fell under the power of foreigners, and the light of civilization that had burned for several thousand years at the Nile expired.

== Inspirations ==
Pharaoh is unique in Prus' oeuvre as a historical novel. A Positivist by philosophical persuasion, Prus had long argued that historical novels must inevitably distort historic reality. He had, however, eventually come over to the view of the French Positivist critic Hippolyte Taine that the arts, including literature, may act as a second means alongside the sciences to study reality, including broad historic reality.

Prus, in the interest of making certain points, intentionally introduced some anachronisms and anatopisms into the novel.

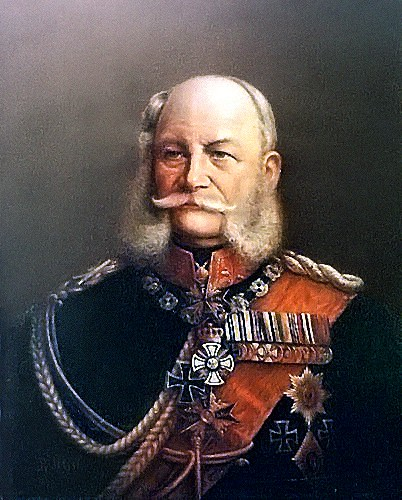
Warlike Kaiser Wilhelm I

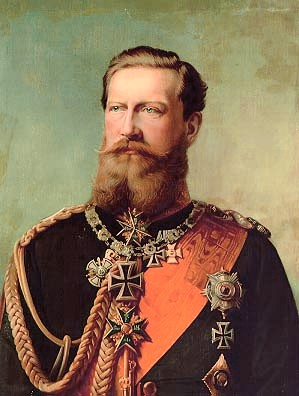
Reform-minded Friedrich III barely outlived Wilhelm I.

The book's depiction of the demise of Egypt's New Kingdom three thousand years earlier, reflects the demise of the Polish–Lithuanian Commonwealth in 1795, exactly a century before Pharaoh's completion.

A preliminary sketch for Prus' only historical novel was his first historical short story, "A Legend of Old Egypt." This remarkable story shows clear parallels with the subsequent novel in setting, theme and denouement. "A Legend of Old Egypt", in its turn, had taken inspiration from contemporaneous events: the fatal 1887-88 illnesses of Germany's warlike Kaiser Wilhelm I and of his reform-minded son and successor, Friedrich III. The latter emperor would, then unbeknown to Prus, survive his ninety-year-old predecessor, but only by ninety-nine days.

In 1893 Prus' old friend Julian Ochorowicz, having returned to Warsaw from Paris, delivered several public lectures on ancient Egyptian knowledge. Ochorowicz (whom Prus had portrayed in The Doll as the scientist "Julian Ochocki," obsessed with inventing a powered flying machine, a decade and a half before the Wright brothers’ 1903 flight) may have inspired Prus to write his historical novel about ancient Egypt. Ochorowicz made available to Prus books on the subject that he had brought from Paris.

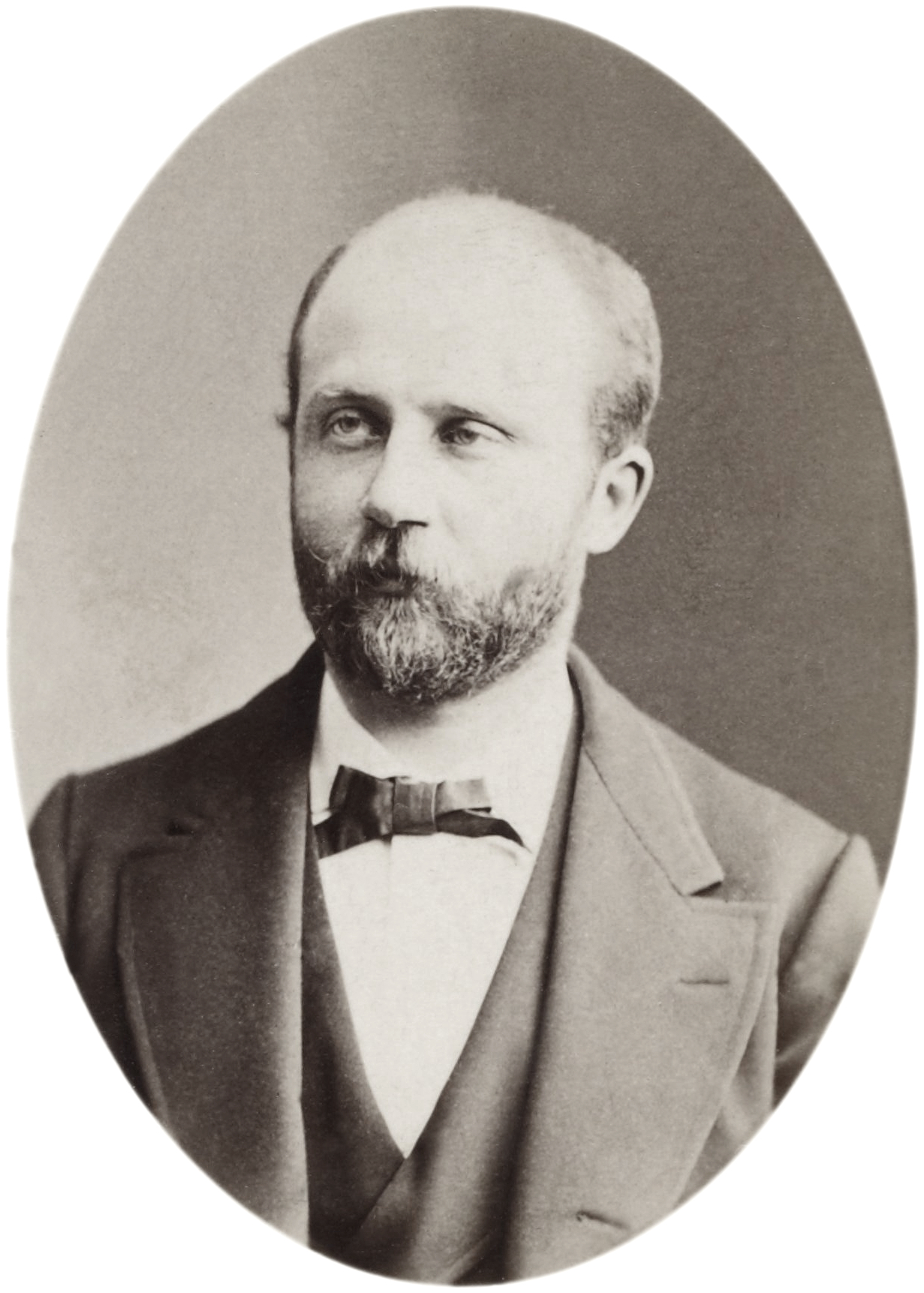
Gaston Maspero

In preparation for composing Pharaoh, Prus made a painstaking study of Egyptological sources, including works by John William Draper, Ignacy Żagiell, Georg Ebers and Gaston Maspero. Prus actually incorporated ancient texts into his novel like tesserae into a mosaic; drawn from one such text was a major character, Ennana.

Pharaoh also alludes to biblical Old Testament accounts of Moses (chapter 7), the plagues of Egypt (chapter 64), and Judith and Holofernes (chapter 7); and to Troy, which had recently been excavated by Heinrich Schliemann.

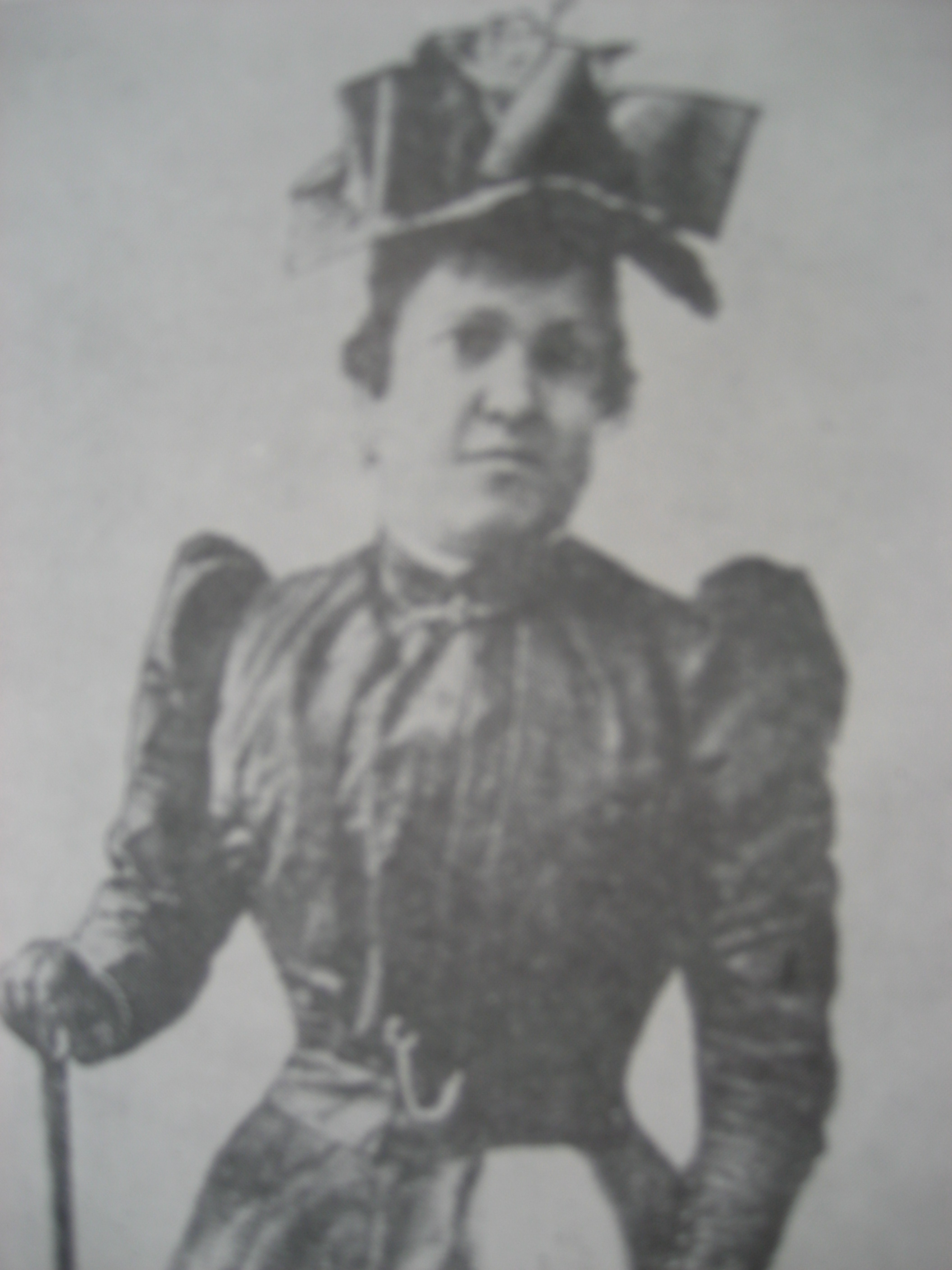
Eusapia Palladino, spiritualist medium, Warsaw, 1893

For certain of the novel's prominent features, Prus, the conscientious journalist and scholar, seems to have insisted on having two sources, one of them based on personal or at least contemporary experience. One such dually-determined feature relates to Egyptian beliefs about an afterlife. In 1893, the year before beginning his novel, Prus the skeptic had started taking an intense interest in Spiritualism, attending Warsaw séances which featured the Italian medium, Eusapia Palladino—the same medium whose Paris séances, a dozen years later, would be attended by Pierre and Marie Curie. Palladino had been brought to Warsaw from a St. Petersburg mediumistic tour by Prus' friend Ochorowicz.

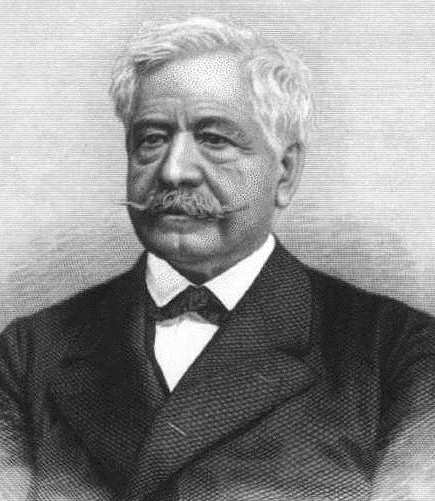
De Lesseps, builder of the Suez Canal

Modern Spiritualism had been initiated in 1848 in Hydeville, New York, by the Fox sisters, Katie and Margaret, aged 11 and 15, and had survived even their 1888 confession that forty years earlier they had caused the "spirits'" telegraph-like tapping sounds by snapping their toe joints. Spiritualist "mediums" in America and Europe claimed to communicate through tapping sounds with spirits of the dead, eliciting their secrets and conjuring up voices, music, noises and other antics, and occasionally working "miracles" such as levitation.

Spiritualism inspired several of Pharaoh's most striking scenes, especially (chapter 20) the secret meeting at the Temple of Seth in Memphis between three Egyptian priests—Herhor, Mefres, Pentuer—and the Chaldean magus-priest Berossus; and (chapter 26) the protagonist Ramses' night-time exploration at the Temple of Hathor in Pi-Bast, when unseen hands touch his head and back.

Another dually determined feature of the novel is the "Suez Canal" that the Phoenician Prince Hiram proposes digging. The modern Suez Canal had been completed by Ferdinand de Lesseps in 1869, a quarter-century before Prus commenced writing Pharaoh. But, as Prus was aware when writing chapter one, the Suez Canal had had a predecessor in a canal that had connected the Nile River with the Red Sea — during Egypt's Middle Kingdom, centuries before the period of the novel.

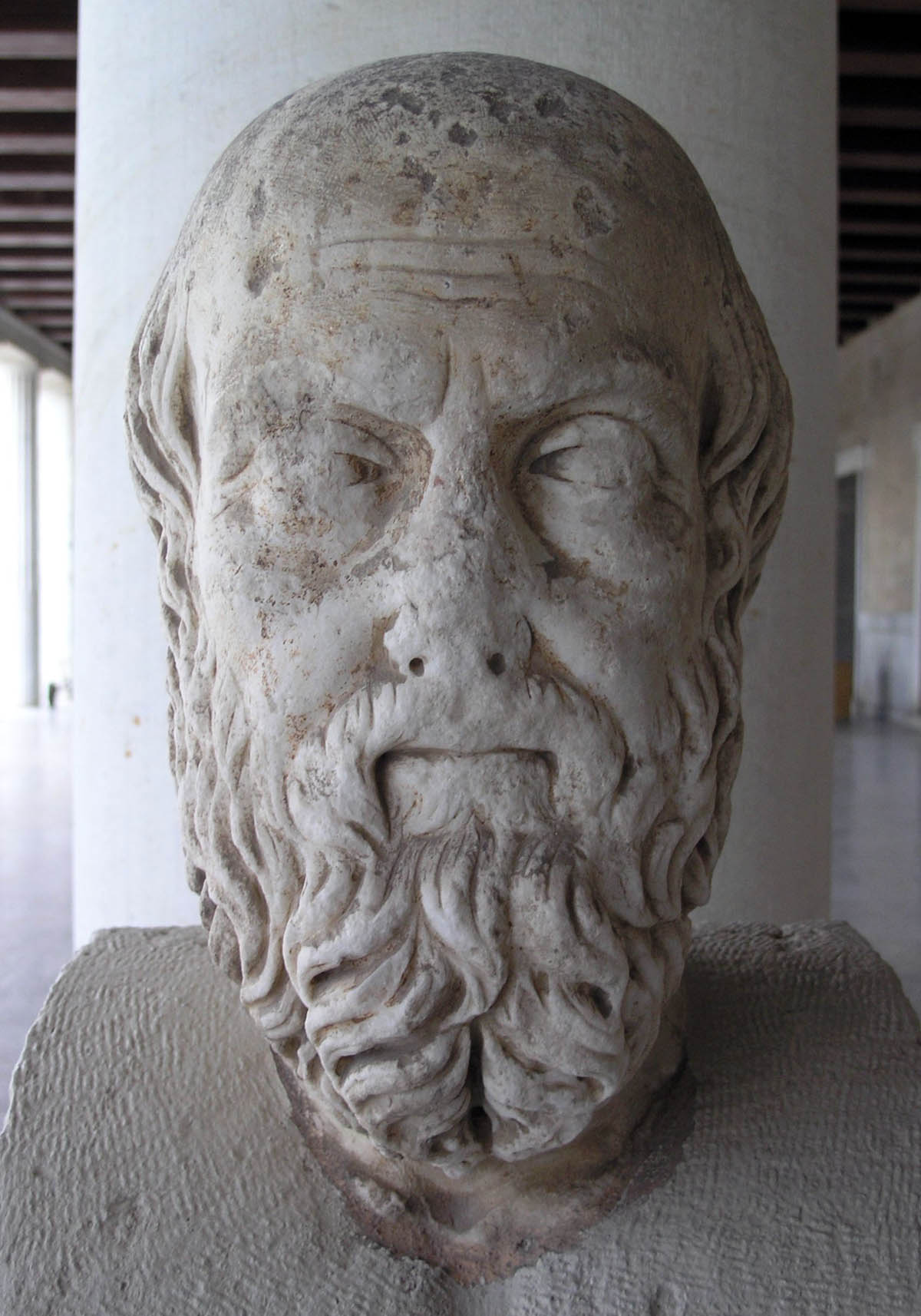
Herodotus described Egypt's Labyrinth.

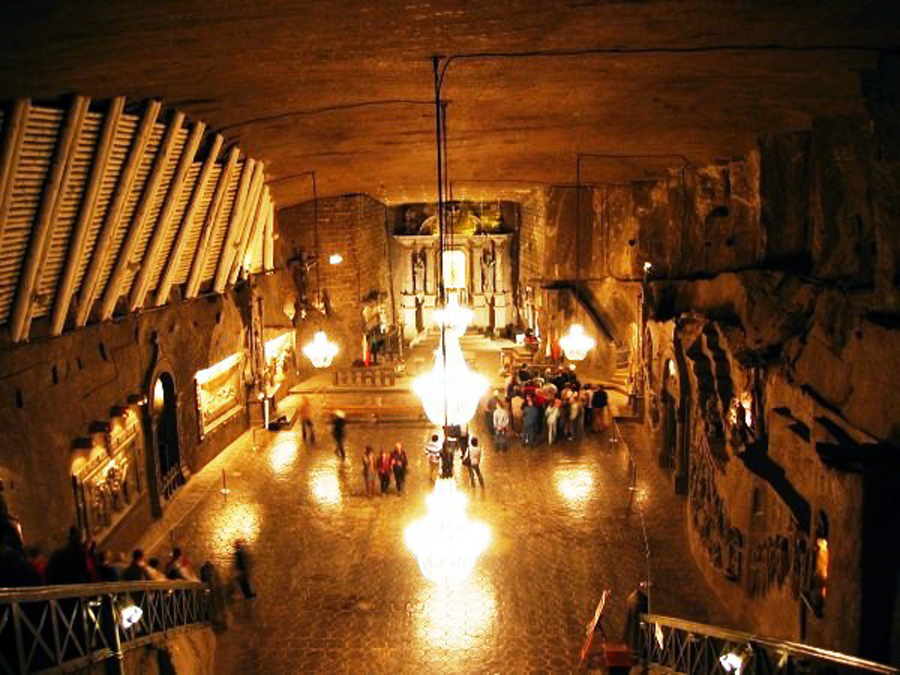
Wieliczka salt mine helped inspire Prus' vision of the Egyptian Labyrinth.

A third dually determined feature of Pharaoh is the historical Egyptian Labyrinth, which had been described in the fifth century BCE in Book II of The Histories of Herodotus. The Father of History had visited Egypt's entirely stone-built administrative center, pronounced it more impressive than the pyramids, declared it "beyond my power to describe"—then proceeded to give a striking description that Prus incorporated into his novel. The Labyrinth had, however, been made palpably real for Prus by an 1878 visit that he had paid to the famous ancient labyrinthine salt mine at Wieliczka, near Kraków in southern Poland. According to the foremost Prus scholar, Zygmunt Szweykowski, "The power of the Labyrinth scenes stems, among other things, from the fact that they echo Prus' own experiences when visiting Wieliczka."

Writing over four decades before the construction of the United States' Fort Knox Depository, Prus pictures Egypt's Labyrinth as a perhaps flood-able Egyptian Fort Knox, a repository of gold bullion and of artistic and historic treasures. It was, he writes (chapter 56), "the greatest treasury in Egypt. [H]ere... was preserved the treasure of the Egyptian kingdom, accumulated over centuries, of which it is difficult today to have any conception."

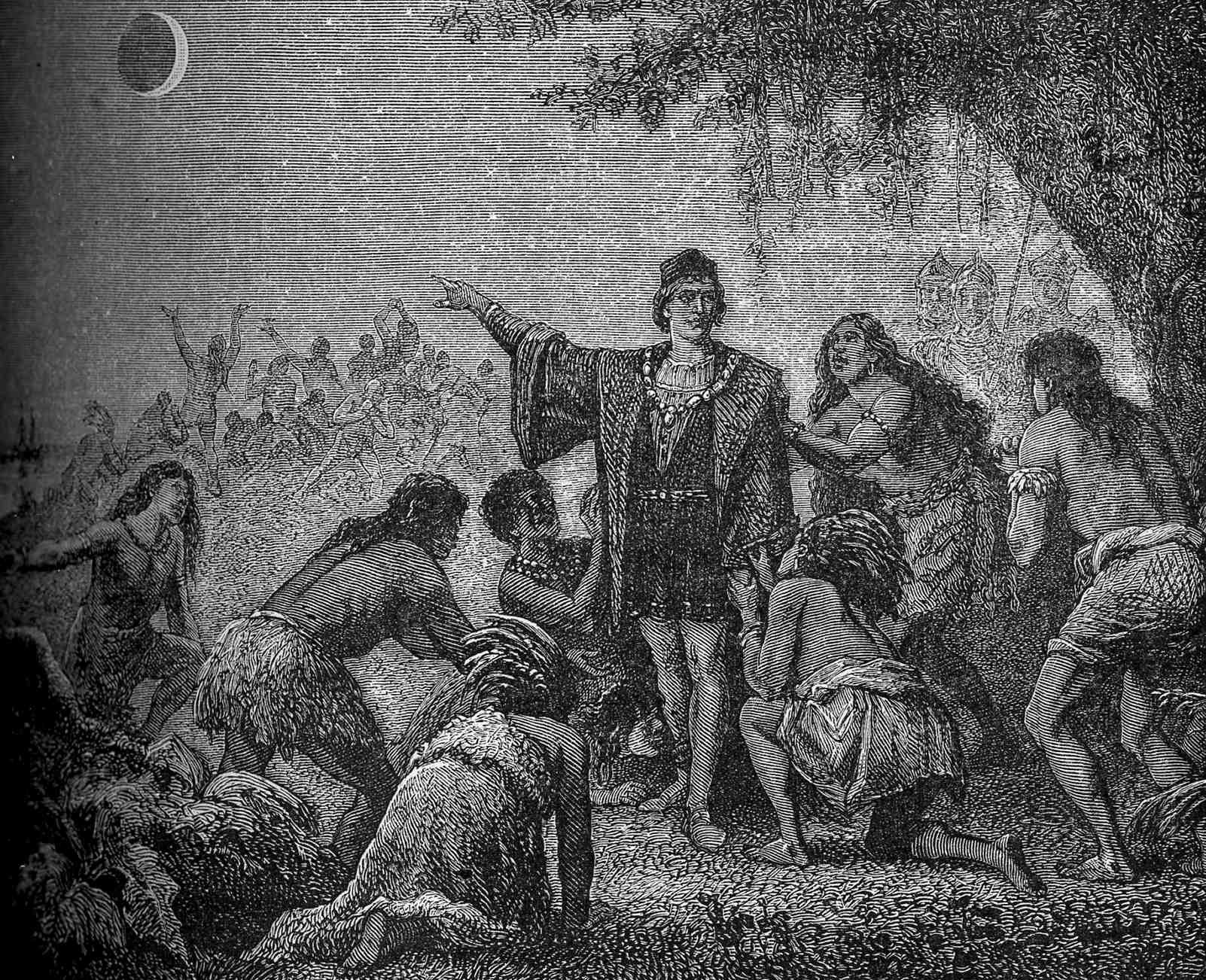
Columbus intimidates natives by predicting a lunar eclipse.

Finally, a fourth dually determined feature was inspired by a solar eclipse that Prus had witnessed at Mława, a hundred kilometers north-northwest of Warsaw, on 19 August 1887, the day before his fortieth birthday. Prus probably also was aware of Christopher Columbus' manipulative use of a lunar eclipse on 29 February 1504, while marooned for a year on Jamaica, to extort provisions from the Arawak natives. The latter incident strikingly resembles the exploitation of a solar eclipse by Ramses' chief adversary, Herhor, high priest of Amon, in a culminating scene of the novel. (Similar use of Columbus' lunar eclipse had in 1889 been made by Mark Twain in A Connecticut Yankee at King Arthur's Court.)

Yet another plot element involves the Greek, Lykon, in chapters 63 and 66 and passim—hypnosis and post-hypnotic suggestion.

It is unclear whether Prus, in using the plot device of the look-alike (Berossus' double; Lykon as double to Ramses), was inspired by earlier novelists who had employed it, including Alexandre Dumas (The Man in the Iron Mask, 1850), Charles Dickens (A Tale of Two Cities, 1859) and Mark Twain (The Prince and the Pauper, 1882).

Prus, a disciple of Positivist philosophy, took a strong interest in the history of science. He was aware of Eratosthenes' remarkably accurate calculation of Earth's circumference, and the invention of a steam engine by Heron of Alexandria, centuries after the period of his novel, in Alexandrian Egypt. In chapter 60, he fictitiously credits these achievements to the priest Menes, one of three individuals of the identical name who are mentioned or depicted in Pharaoh: Prus was not always fastidious about characters' names.

== Accuracy ==
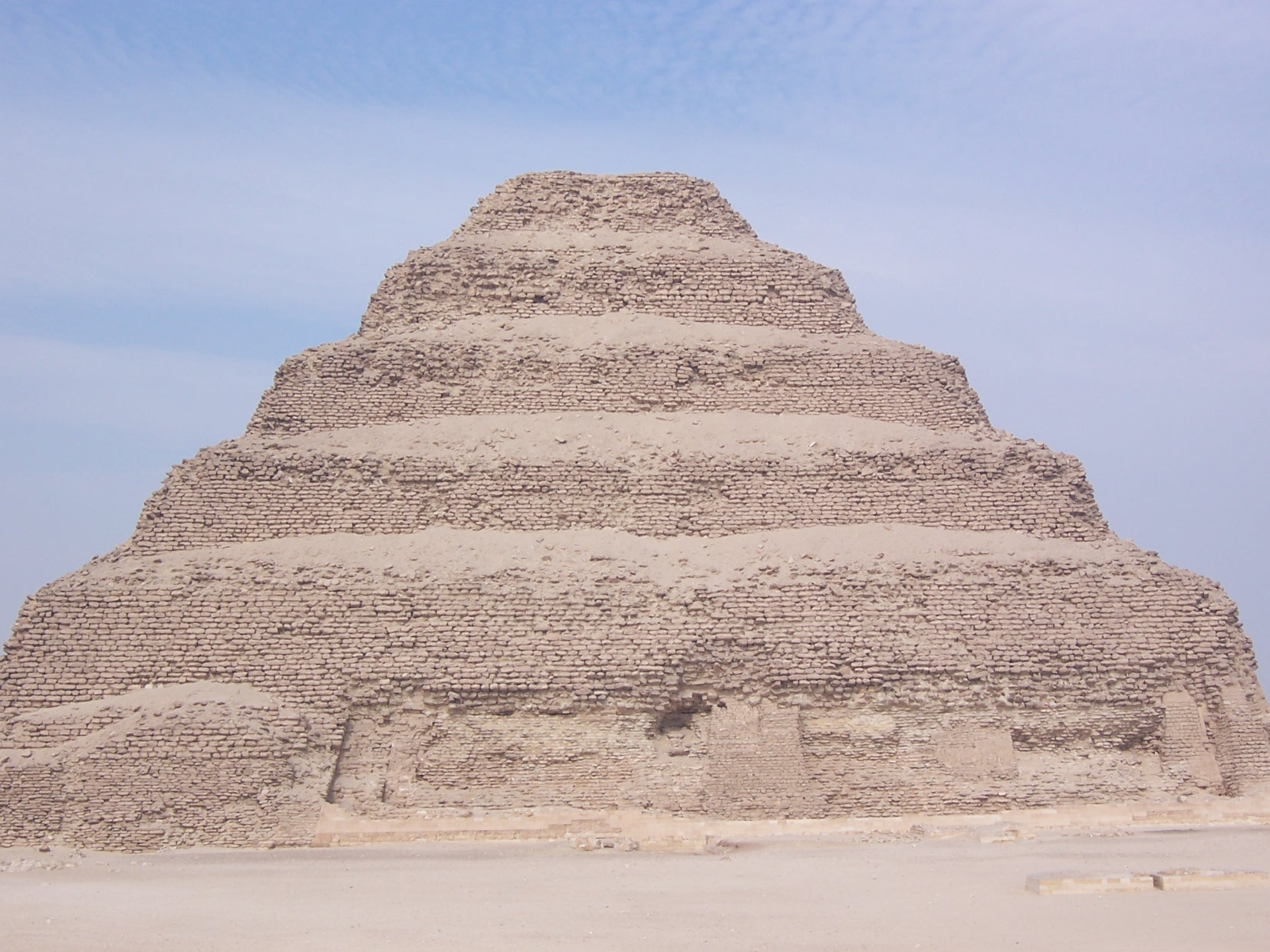
Zoser's Step Pyramid at Saqqara — metaphor, in stone, for Egypt's social stratification (discussed in Pharaoh, chapter 18)

Examples of anachronism and anatopism, mentioned above, bear out that a punctilious historical accuracy was never an object with Prus in writing Pharaoh. "That's not the point", Prus' compatriot Joseph Conrad told a relative. Prus had long emphasized in his "Weekly Chronicles" articles that historical novels cannot but distort historic reality. He used ancient Egypt as a canvas on which to depict his deeply considered perspectives on man, civilization and politics.

Nevertheless, Pharaoh is remarkably accurate, even from the standpoint of present-day Egyptology. The novel does a notable job of recreating a primal ancient civilization, complete with the geography, climate, plants, animals, ethnicities, countryside, agriculture, cities, trades, commerce, social stratification, politics, religion and warfare. Prus succeeds remarkably in transporting readers back to the Egypt of thirty-one centuries ago.

The embalming and funeral scenes; the court protocol; the waking and feeding of the gods; the religious beliefs, ceremonies and processions; the concept behind the design of Pharaoh Zoser's Step Pyramid at Saqqara; the descriptions of travels and of locales visited on the Nile and in the desert; Egypt's exploitation of Nubia as a source of gold — all draw upon scholarly documentation. The personalities and behaviors of the characters are keenly observed and deftly drawn, often with the aid of apt Egyptian texts.

== Popularity ==
Pharaoh, as a "political novel", has remained perennially topical ever since it was written. The book's enduring popularity, however, has as much to do with a critical yet sympathetic view of human nature and the human condition. Prus offers a vision of mankind as rich as Shakespeare's, ranging from the sublime to the quotidian, from the tragic to the comic. The book is written in limpid prose, imbued with poetry, leavened with humor, graced with moments of transcendent beauty.

Joseph Conrad, during his 1914 visit to Poland just as World War I was breaking out, "delighted in his beloved Prus" and read Pharaoh and everything else by the ten-years-older, recently deceased author that he could get his hands on. He pronounced his fellow victim of Poland's 1863 Uprising "better than Dickens"—Dickens being a favorite author of Conrad's.

The novel has been translated into 24 languages: Arabic, Armenian, Bulgarian, Croatian, Czech, Dutch, English, Esperanto, Estonian, French, Georgian, German, Hebrew, Hungarian, Latvian, Lithuanian, Romanian, Russian, Serbo-Croatian, Slovak, Slovenian, Spanish, and Ukrainian.

== Film ==
In 1966 Pharaoh was adapted as a Polish feature film directed by Jerzy Kawalerowicz. In 1967 the film was nominated for an Academy Award for Best Foreign-Language Film.

== See also ==
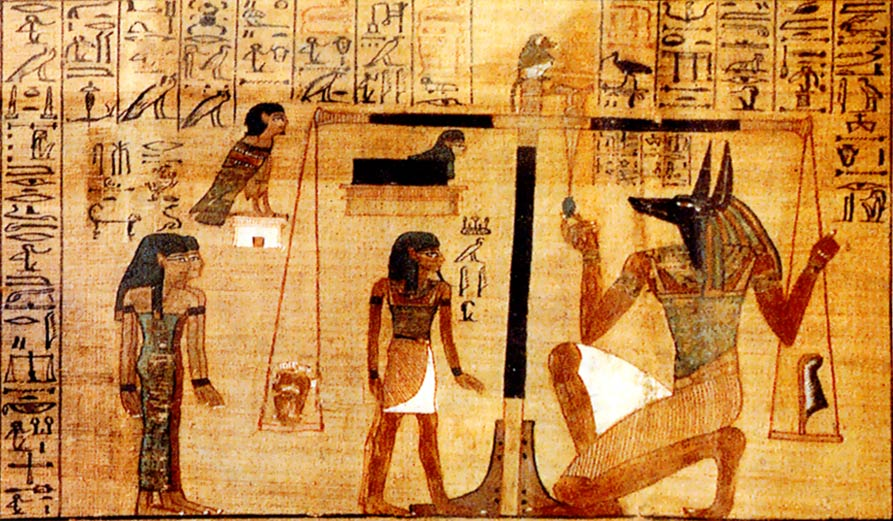
Weighing-of-the-heart scene from Egyptian Book of the Dead (described in Pharaoh, chapter 53). Illustration from Papyrus of Ani at the British Museum.

- Anachronism
- Anatopism
- Assassinations in fiction
- Bildungsroman
- Egypt in the European imagination
- Historically significant lunar eclipses
- Hypnosis in fiction
- Jeremiah Curtin
- Kazimierz Bein
- Labyrinth of Egypt
- "A Legend of Old Egypt"
- Look-alike
- "Mold of the Earth"
- Pharaoh (film)
- Political fiction
- Politics in fiction
- Solar eclipses in fiction
- Spiritualism in fiction
- Utopian and dystopian fiction
- Wieliczka Salt Mine

== Sources ==
- Czesław Miłosz, The History of Polish Literature, New York, Macmillan, 1969.
- Kasparek, Christopher (1986). "Prus' Pharaoh and Curtin's Translation". The Polish Review. XXXI (2–3): 127–35. JSTOR 25778204.
- Kasparek, Christopher (1994). "Prus' Pharaoh: the Creation of a Historical Novel". The Polish Review. XXXIX (1): 45–50. JSTOR 25778765.
- Christopher Kasparek, "Prus' Pharaoh: Primer on Power", The Polish Review, vol. XL, no. 3, 1995, pp. 331–34.
- Christopher Kasparek, "Prus' Pharaoh and the Wieliczka Salt Mine", The Polish Review, vol. XLII, no. 3, 1997, pp. 349–55.
- Christopher Kasparek, "Prus' Pharaoh and the Solar Eclipse", The Polish Review, vol. XLII, no. 4, 1997, pp. 471–78.
- Christopher Kasparek, "A Futurological Note: Prus on H.G. Wells and the Year 2000," The Polish Review, vol. XLVIII, no. 1, 2003, pp. 89–100.
- Zygmunt Szweykowski, Twórczość Bolesława Prusa (The Creative Writing of Bolesław Prus), 2nd edition, Warsaw, Państwowy Instytut Wydawniczy, 1972.
- Zygmunt Szweykowski, Nie tylko o Prusie: szkice (Not Only about Prus: Sketches), Poznań, Wydawnictwo Poznańskie, 1967.
- Krystyna Tokarzówna and Stanisław Fita, Bolesław Prus, 1847-1912: Kalendarz życia i twórczości (Bolesław Prus, 1847-1912: a Calendar of [His] Life and Work), edited by Zygmunt Szweykowski, Warsaw, Państwowy Instytut Wydawniczy, 1969.
- Edward Pieścikowski, Bolesław Prus, 2nd ed., Warsaw, Państwowe Wydawnictwo Naukowe, 1985.
- Stanisław Fita, ed., Wspomnienia o Bolesławie Prusie (Reminiscences about Bolesław Prus), Warsaw, Państwowy Instytut Wydawniczy, 1962.
- Zdzisław Najder, Joseph Conrad: a Life, translated by Halina Najder, Rochester, Camden House, 2007, ISBN 1-57113-347-X.
- Zdzisław Najder, Conrad under Familial Eyes, Cambridge University Press, 1984, ISBN 0-521-25082-X.
- Teresa Tyszkiewicz, Bolesław Prus, Warsaw, Państwowe Zakłady Wydawnictw Szkolnych, 1971.
- Jan Zygmunt Jakubowski, ed., Literatura polska od średniowiecza do pozytywizmu (Polish Literature from the Middle Ages to Positivism), Warsaw, Państwowe Wydawnictwo Naukowe, 1979.
- James Henry Breasted, A History of Egypt from the Earliest Times to the Persian Conquest, New York, Bantam Books, 1967.
- Adolf Erman, ed., The Ancient Egyptians: a Sourcebook of Their Writings, translated [from the German] by Aylward M. Blackman, introduction to the Torchbook edition by William Kelly Simpson, New York, Harper & Row, 1966.
- Herodotus, The Histories, translated and with an introduction by Aubrey de Sélincourt, Harmondsworth, England, Penguin Books, 1965.
- Samuel Eliot Morison, Christopher Columbus, Mariner, Boston, Little, Brown and Company, 1955.
- Bolesław Prus, Pharaoh, translated from the Polish, with foreword and notes, by Christopher Kasparek, Amazon Kindle e-book, 2020, ASIN:BO8MDN6CZV.
