= Labyrinth of Egypt =

Archaeological site in Egypt

- معبد اللابرانت (Arabic) /maʕbad al.laːbranˈt/
- قصر التيه (Arabic) /ˈqasˤr ətˈtiːh/
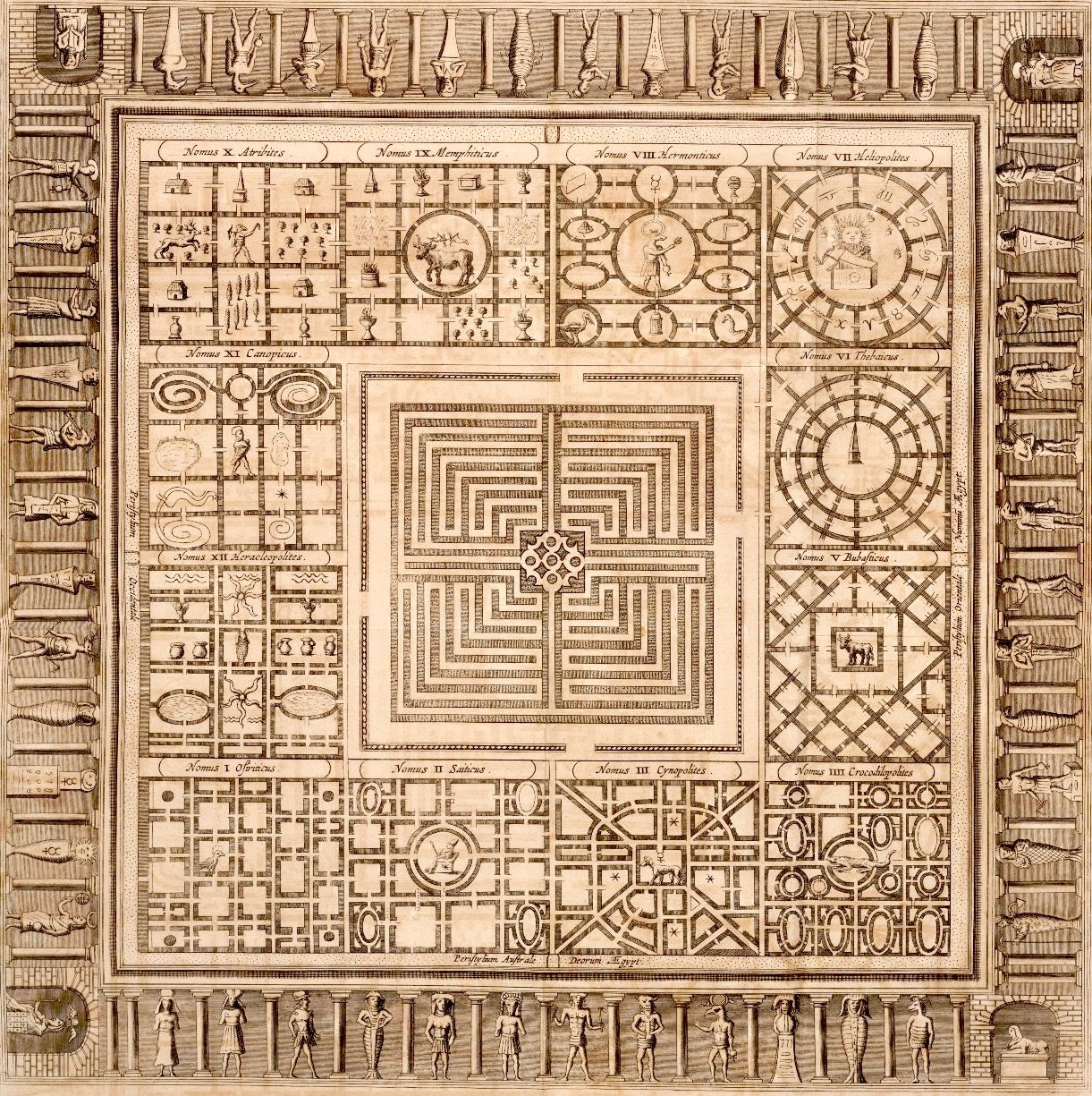
- Interpretation of the Egyptian Labyrinth—original by Athanasius Kircher 1670—as described by Herodotus.

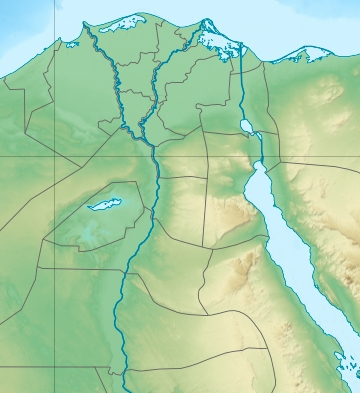
- Location within Northern Egypt
- 29.273°N 30.899°E
- Type: Archaeological site
- Periods: Middle Kingdom of Egypt
- Cultures: Twelfth Dynasty
- Associated with: Amenemhat III
- Location: Faiyum Governorate
- Region: Middle Egypt
- Part of: Hawara

Site notes
- Archaeologists: Karl Richard Lepsius Flinders Petrie
- Public access: Open

The Labyrinth of Egypt was a structure, or temple, built south of Amenemhat III's pyramid at Hawara. Not much is known about its use, but it was probably a multifunctional building—with a palace, town and administrative centre. Its complex layout reminded visitors in classical times of the legendary labyrinth of Minos at Knossos in Crete.

The site has garnered interest throughout history, and contemporary excavations have unearthed artifacts from both Amenemhat's reign and the Roman era. More recently, the area has been subject to new studies using geophysical imaging—but a high local water table may threaten the site's conservation and impede future research.

== Description ==
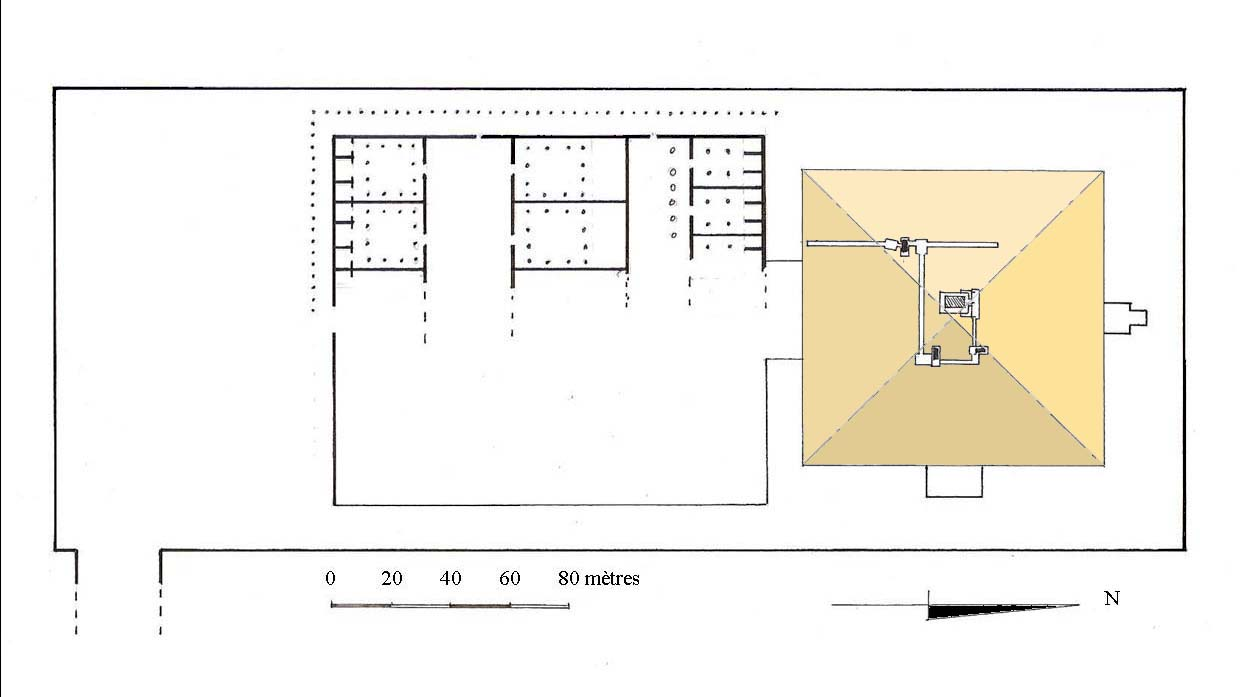
A reconstruction of the Labyrinth of Egypt's western portion (center). The structure itself was formerly located at the foot of the Pyramid of Amenemhat III at Hawara (right).

The labyrinth's construction has been most frequently attributed to Amenemhat III, who ruled c. 1800 BC as the sixth pharaoh of the Twelfth Dynasty and was likely buried in the Hawara pyramid. Karl Richard Lepsius also discovered cartouches bearing the name of Amenemhat's daughter, Sobekneferu, suggesting that she made additions to the complex's decorations during her reign as Egypt's first female pharaoh.

The structure may have been a collection of funerary temples, like those commonly found near Egyptian pyramids, but was probably also a multifunctional building, used as a town, administrative centre, palace, and place of worship.

Since the temple was destroyed in antiquity, it can only be partially reconstructed. A north-south oriented perimeter wall enclosed the entire complex which thus measured 385 m (1,263 ft) by 158 m (518 ft), and the floorplan of the labyrinth itself is estimated to have covered around 28,000 m^{2} (300,000 ft^{2}). After excavating the site in 1888, Flinders Petrie argued that the northernmost portion of the labyrinth had been composed of nine shrines that collectively stood behind twenty-seven columns that ran east-to-west; in front of these stood twelve columned courts that were divided into two groups by a long hall.

== Historical record ==
=== Classical accounts ===
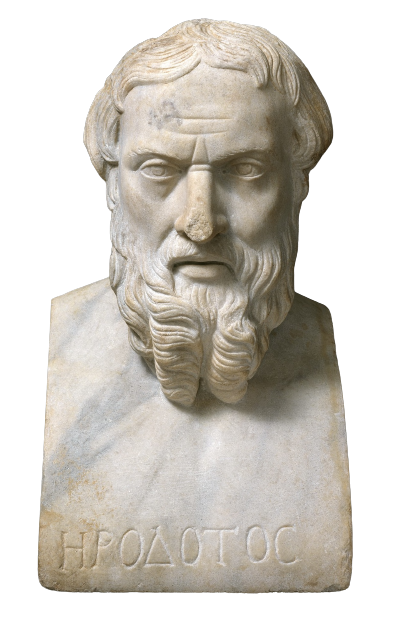
The Labyrinth of Egypt was notably described by the Ancient Greek author Herodotus, who claimed in Book II of his Histories that the structure's greatness surpassed that of the Egyptian pyramids.

The first major historian to discuss the labyrinth was the Greek author Herodotus (c. 484 BC – c. 425 BC), who, in Book II of his Histories, wrote that the structure surpassed the greatness of even the Egyptian pyramids:

[The Egyptians] made a labyrinth [... which] surpasses even the pyramids. It has twelve roofed courts with doors facing each other: six face north and six south, in two continuous lines, all within one outer wall. There are also double sets of chambers, three thousand altogether, fifteen hundred above and the same number under ground. ... We learned through conversation about [the labyrinth's] underground chambers; the Egyptian caretakers would by no means show them, as they were, they said, the burial vaults of the kings who first built this labyrinth, and of the sacred crocodiles. ... The upper we saw for ourselves, and they are creations greater than human. The exits of the chambers and the mazy passages hither and thither through the courts were an unending marvel to us ... Over all this is a roof, made of stone like the walls, and the walls are covered with cut figures, and every court is set around with pillars of white stone very precisely fitted together. Near the corner where the labyrinth ends stands a pyramid two hundred and forty feet high, on which great figures are cut. A passage to this has been made underground.

Several centuries after Herodotus, the Greek geographer Strabo (c. 64 BC – c. 24 AD) described the labyrinth in his work Geographica, noting a connection between the number of courts in the structure and the nomes of ancient Egypt:

We have [near Lake Moeris] also the Labyrinth, a work equal to the Pyramids, and adjoining to it the tomb of the king who constructed the Labyrinth. [... This structure is a] large palace composed of as many palaces as there were formerly nomes. ... At the end of this building ... is the tomb, which is a quadrangular pyramid ... The name of the person buried there is Imandes. [This king] built [the labyrinth with] this number of aulae, because it was the custom for all the nomes to assemble there together according to their rank, with their own priests and priestesses, for the purpose of performing sacrifices and making offerings to the gods, and of administering justice in matters of great importance.

Around the general time of Strabo, the Greek historian Diodorus Siculus (fl. 1st century BC) also wrote about the structure, contending in his Bibliotheca historica that it was constructed by "King Mendes" and was "not so remarkable for its size as it was impossible to imitate in respect to its ingenious design; for a man who enters it cannot easily find his way out, unless he gets a guide who is thoroughly acquainted with the structure." Diodorus Siculus also furthered the claim that the Egyptian labyrinth inspired Daedalus to build the Cretan labyrinth for King Minos.

Circa 44 AD, the Roman geographer Pomponius Mela discussed the labyrinth in his work Chorographia, and later that century, Pliny the Elder described the structure in his Naturalis Historia, writing:

There is still in Egypt ... a labyrinth, which was the first constructed, three thousand six hundred years ago, they say, by King Petesuchis or Tithöes: although, according to Herodotus, the entire work was the production of no less than twelve kings, the last of whom was Psammetichus. As to the purpose for which it was built [... many] assert that it was a building consecrated to the Sun, an opinion which mostly prevails. ... A thing that surprises me [is that] the building is constructed of Parian marble, while throughout the other parts of it the columns are of syenites. With such solidity is this huge mass constructed, that the lapse of ages has been totally unable to destroy it, seconded as it has been by the people of Heracleopolites, who have marvelously ravaged a work which they have always held in abhorrence.

One of the last mentions of the labyrinth in classical literature occurs in the Historia Augusta, which states that the Roman emperor Septimius Severus (145–211 AD) visited the structure c. 200 AD.

The classical accounts of various authors are not entirely consistent, perhaps due to degradation of the structure during classical times. Other errors are likely due to certain authors not having seen the structure in person: Diodorus Siculus, for instance, describes the labyrinth as possessing "architectural features which are virtually impossible in an Egyptian temple", which suggests that he was relying on a source who erroneously assumed that the labyrinth looked like Grecian temples of the time. Likewise, Pliny's description includes a number of odd flourishes that Alan B. Lloyd argues is evidence of "a desperate attempt [by Pliny] to reconcile several accounts of the building".

=== Destruction ===
At some point in antiquity, the Labyrinth of Egypt was dismantled. Inge Uytterhoeven and Ingrid Blom-Böer argue that, since Greco-Roman buildings were erected only on top of the western portion of the labyrinth's ruins, it is likely that this portion of the structure had already been demolished by the Late Period or early Ptolemaic era. Uytterhoeven and Blom-Böer further reason that the eastern portion was likely used or maintained into the Ptolemaic and possibly Roman eras, given both the absence of Greco-Roman ruins in that area and the fact that the labyrinth's most "imposing architectural and sculptural elements" were found there.

Following the end of Roman rule, the ruins of the labyrinth were quarried for stone. After most of the stones had been carted away, the location of the structure was gradually forgotten. What little remained of the labyrinth was further marred when, some time prior to the mid-13th century AD, (Note: Many sources, such as Uytterhoeven & Blom-Böer (2002), claim that this canal was constructed in the 14th century based on Lepsius's claim that the Bahr Sharqiyyah was constructed by the Mamluk Sultan Barquq (c. 1336–1399). However, as Bryan Kraemer notes, the 13th century writer Uthman al-Nabulsi "includes the Bahr Sharqiyyah in his description of the Fayum, [meaning] that the canal across Hawara in fact was dug before the mid 13th cent. AD.") a canal (the Bahr Sharqiyyah, also known as the Bahr Seilah) was dug through the middle of the labyrinth's reported location in Hawara. In 1900–1907, a newer canal (the Bahr Abdul Wahbi) was built over the Bahr Sharqiyyah, which caused additional damage to the site.

== Rediscovery ==
=== Modern era ===
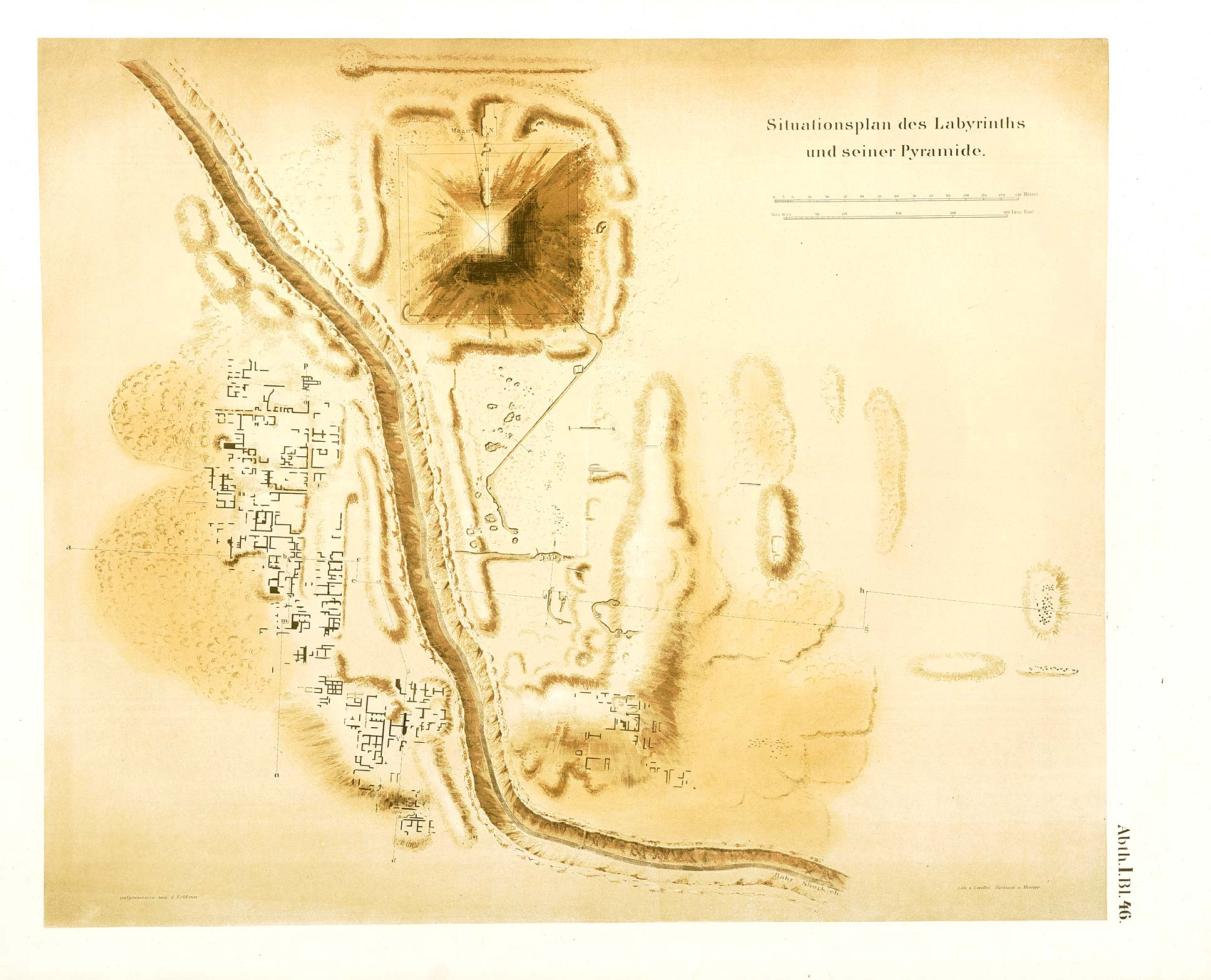
A drawing of the Pyramid of Amenemhat III at Hawara and the surrounding ruins, made by Karl Richard Lepsius c. 1850. Note the Bahr Sharqiyyah canal running through the site.

In the 17th century, Claude Sicard suggested that the labyrinth may have been located at Hawara. Two centuries later, in a volume of Description de l'Égypte (1821), Philippe Joseph Marie Caristie and Edme-François Jomard discussed the location of the labyrinth in an extended consideration of the Hawara site; Eric P. Uphill has thus argued that Jomard and Caristie's chapter was consequently "the first published description of ... the Labyrinth site [that] distinguish[ed] the salient features [of the structure] correctly". Subsequent works postulated that the ruins south of the Pyramid of Amenemhat III were in fact the remains of the labyrinth, including brief reports by Howard Vyse and John Shae Perring (1842) and John Gardner Wilkinson (1843).

In 1843, the Prussian Egyptologist Karl Richard Lepsius excavated the area around the Pyramid of Amenemhat III at Hawara and, after uncovering the remnants of a series of brick chambers, argued that he had positively identified the location of the famed labyrinth. Around this time, Lepsius's student, G. M. Ebers, further contended that if one were to climb the pyramid, they would be able to see the horseshoe-like imprint of the structure. However, as W. H. Matthews notes: "The data furnished by [Lepsius and his associates] were not altogether of a convincing character, and it was felt that further evidence was required before their conclusions could be accepted."

The last person to conduct an official survey of the labyrinth's location in Hawara was the British Egyptologist Flinders Petrie. In 1888, he examined the brick chambers that Lepsius had uncovered and determined that they were the remnants of a Greco-Roman town that had been constructed on top of the labyrinth's ruins. During his survey, Petrie reportedly managed to uncover what little remained of its foundations amidst a "great bed of chips", although his investigations were ultimately cut short due to a lack of resources. Petrie was also able to locate a limestone statue of Sobek and another of Hathor, as well as two granite shrines that each contained a statue of Amenemhat III. Among his other finds included many Greco-Roman artifacts, including papyri containing parts of the Iliad. The results of Petrie's investigation were later published in the monograph The Labyrinth Gerzeh and Mazghuneh (1912).

=== Contemporary research ===
Since Petrie's study in the early 20th century, no large-scale excavations of the labyrinth have been carried out. Some projects, however, have employed non-destructive methods to study the site instead, including geophysical imaging. Using VLF-EM scanning techniques, Khalil et al. (2010) reported subsurface anomalies south of the Pyramid of Amenemhat that the authors suggest "may identify the walls and rooms of the labyrinth mortuary temple complex". The VLF data were supplemented by a VES survey, the results of which were in agreement. Similarly, Elshazly & Massoud (2024) used electrical resistivity tomography to examine the Hawara complex, discovering possible evidence for "subsurface archaeological remains" where the labyrinth once stood (although the researchers noted that further verification through excavation was necessary). Elshazly & Massoud (2024) further note that water intrusion was threatening the Hawara complex and that potential remediation methods, such as adjustments to irrigation systems of neighbouring agricultural land, could protect the site.

== Legacy ==
Herodotus' description of the Labyrinth of Egypt would go on to inspire several scenes in Bolesław Prus' 1895 historical novel Pharaoh.
