= Anatopism =

Something out of its proper place

An anatopism (from the Ancient Greek ἀνά, "against," and τόπος, "place") is something that is out of its proper place.

The concept of anatopism is less widely familiar than that of anachronism, perhaps because much that is anatopic is also anachronistic. Yet the distinction is a valid one; not all that is anatopic is necessarily also anachronistic.

The online Collins English Dictionary gives a synonym for "anatopism": anachorism (from Greek: ana- + khōros, "place"): "a geographical misplacement; something located in an incongruent position".

== Examples ==
Catherine Hardwicke's 2006 film The Nativity Story shows a field of maize in a Nazareth farming scene. Maize is native to Mesoamerica, not to the Middle East, and in pre-Columbian times was grown only in the Americas. The use of maize in this film is an anatopism as well as an anachronism.

The same anatopism appears in the first part ("The Warrior Pharaohs") of a three-part 2002 PBS documentary series on "Egypt's Golden Empire" depicting the history of ancient Egypt's New Kingdom: ears of maize corn are shown in a scene recreating the battle and siege of Megiddo in the 15th century BC.

Ridley Scott's 2000 film Gladiator, set in 180 AD, features Roman soldiers riding horses using saddles with stirrups. While the Romans had had saddles since about 100 BC, and stirrups had existed in the world since about 700 BC, stirrups did not appear in Europe until about the 6th or 7th century AD, making them both anatopic and anachronistic.

The opening scene of Disney's 1994 film The Lion King features a variety of African animals venturing to Pride Rock. However, the ants that appear in the scene hold leaves in their mandibles, behavior that only leaf cutter ants in Latin America exhibit.

In King of Kings (1961), directed by Nicholas Ray, Jesus is shown dropping to the ground during his journey through the wilderness to suck water from a prickly pear cactus. However, cacti are native to the Americas, and prickly pears were only introduced to the Middle East in the 18th century.

John Ford's much-lauded 1939 film Stagecoach was filmed in Monument Valley on the Arizona-Utah border, but textually set in southeastern Arizona and southwestern New Mexico. The vegetation and topography of Monument Valley and the lower-altitude deserts are vastly different, rendering the film's actual location notably anatopic.

Scenes of the Oklahoma Land Rush of 1889 in the 1960 film Cimarron were shot near Tucson, Arizona. The arid subtropical Sonoran Desert landscape bears no resemblance to the fertile terrain of the central Oklahoma of the land rush, and in the background are sky island mountains typical of the desert Southwest but non-existent in Oklahoma.

The Polish writer Bolesław Prus, for the sake of making a point, introduces into chapter 63 of his historical novel Pharaoh, set in the ancient Egypt of 1087–1085 BC, a substance that behaves like gunpowder. This appears to be both an anachronism and an anatopism, since gunpowder is thought to have been invented, some time later, in China or in Arabia. Another apparent anatopism introduced by the author (in chapter 45) is an object that resembles a telescope, that may also be an anachronism.

== See also ==
- Anachronism
