= Hawara =

Village in Faiyum Governorate, Egypt

Coordinates: 29°16′27″N 30°53′56″E

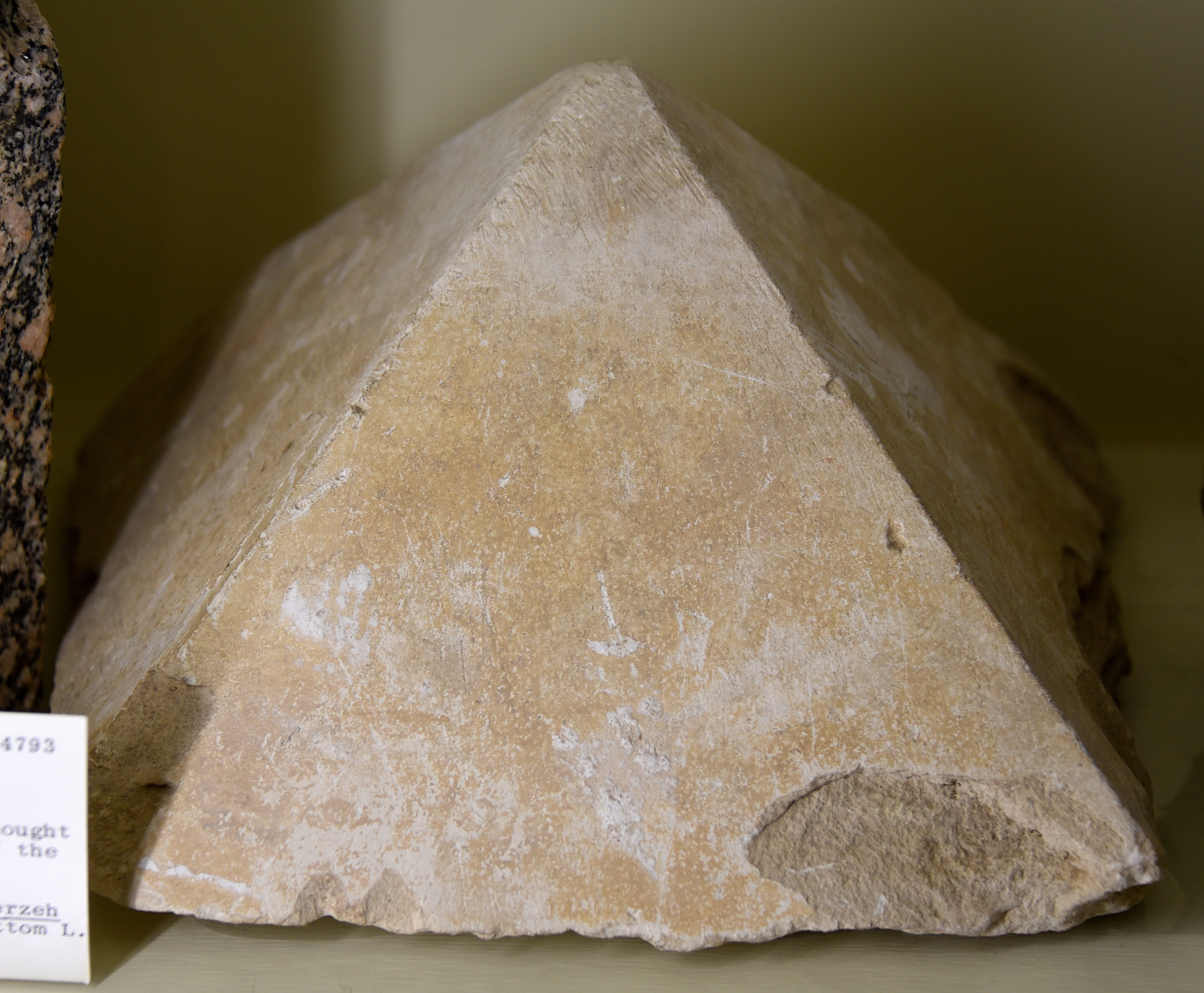
Limestone pyramidion from the Hawara pyramid. Sir Flinders Petrie thought that this represented a model for Hawara pyramid. 12th Dynasty. From Hawara, Egypt. Petrie Museum, London.

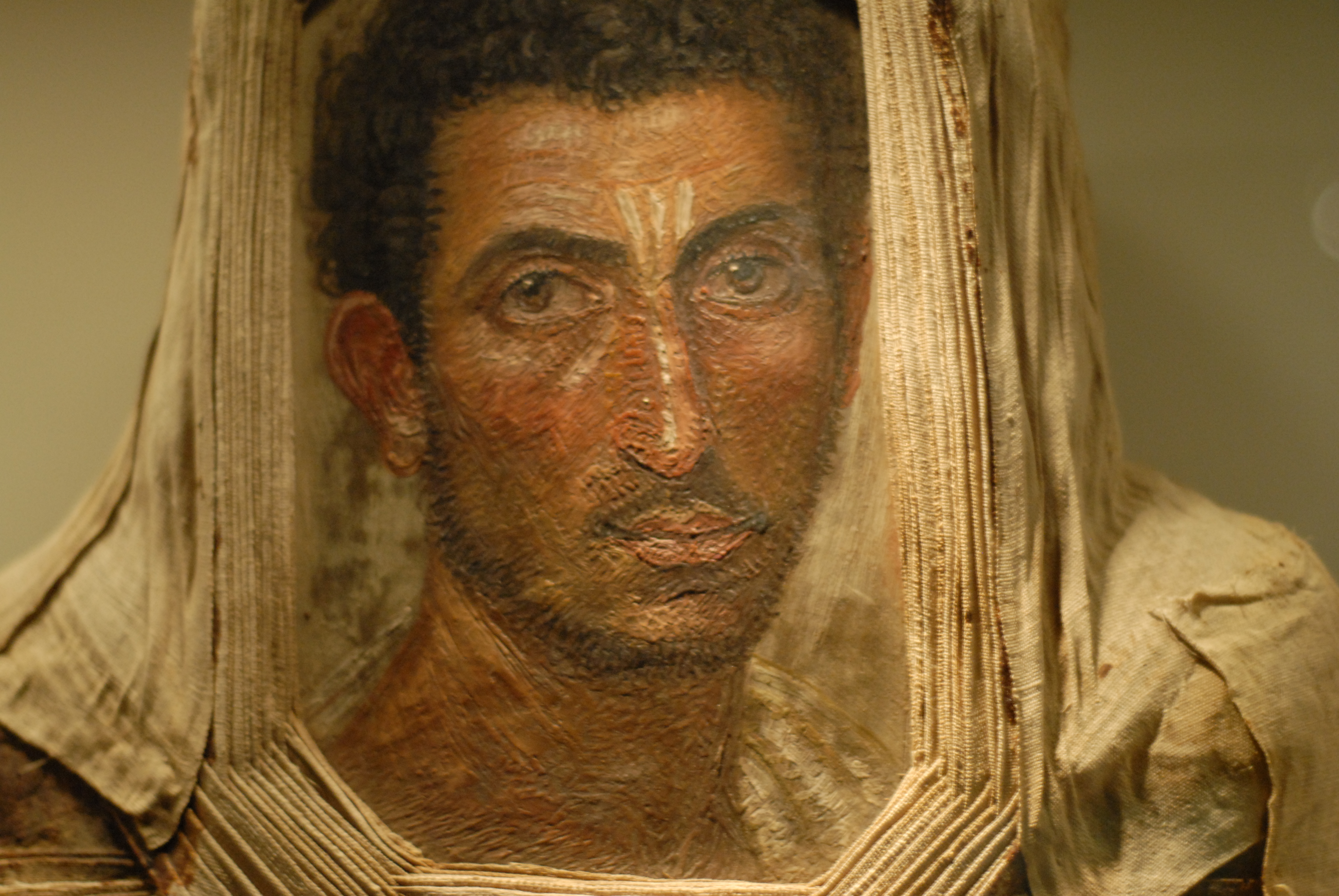
Petrie unearthed a number of vivid Fayum mummy portraits in 1911

Hawara (Arabic: هوارة المقطع, romanized: Hawāra al-Maqṭaʿ) is an archaeological site of Ancient Egypt, south of the site of Crocodilopolis ('Arsinoë', also known as 'Medinet al-Faiyum') at the entrance to the depression of the Fayyum oasis. It is the site of a pyramid built by King Amenemhat III of the 12th dynasty, between the 19th and 18th centuries BC.

== History ==
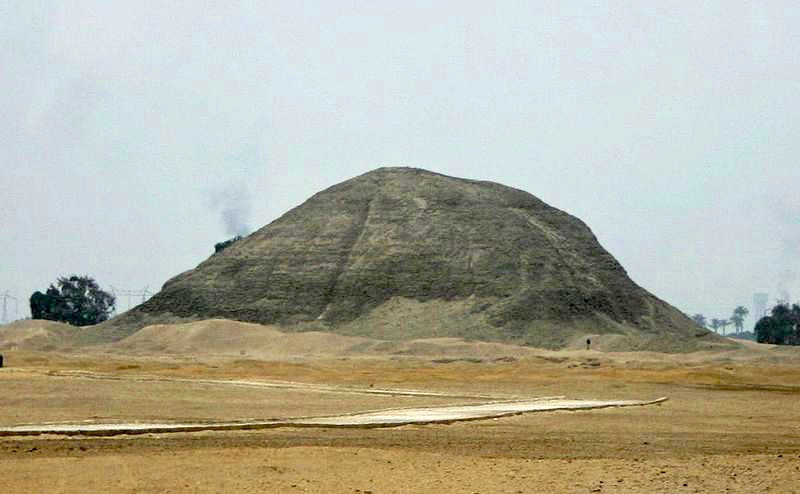
The Pyramid of the 12th Dynasty Pharaoh Amenemhat III at Hawara, from the east

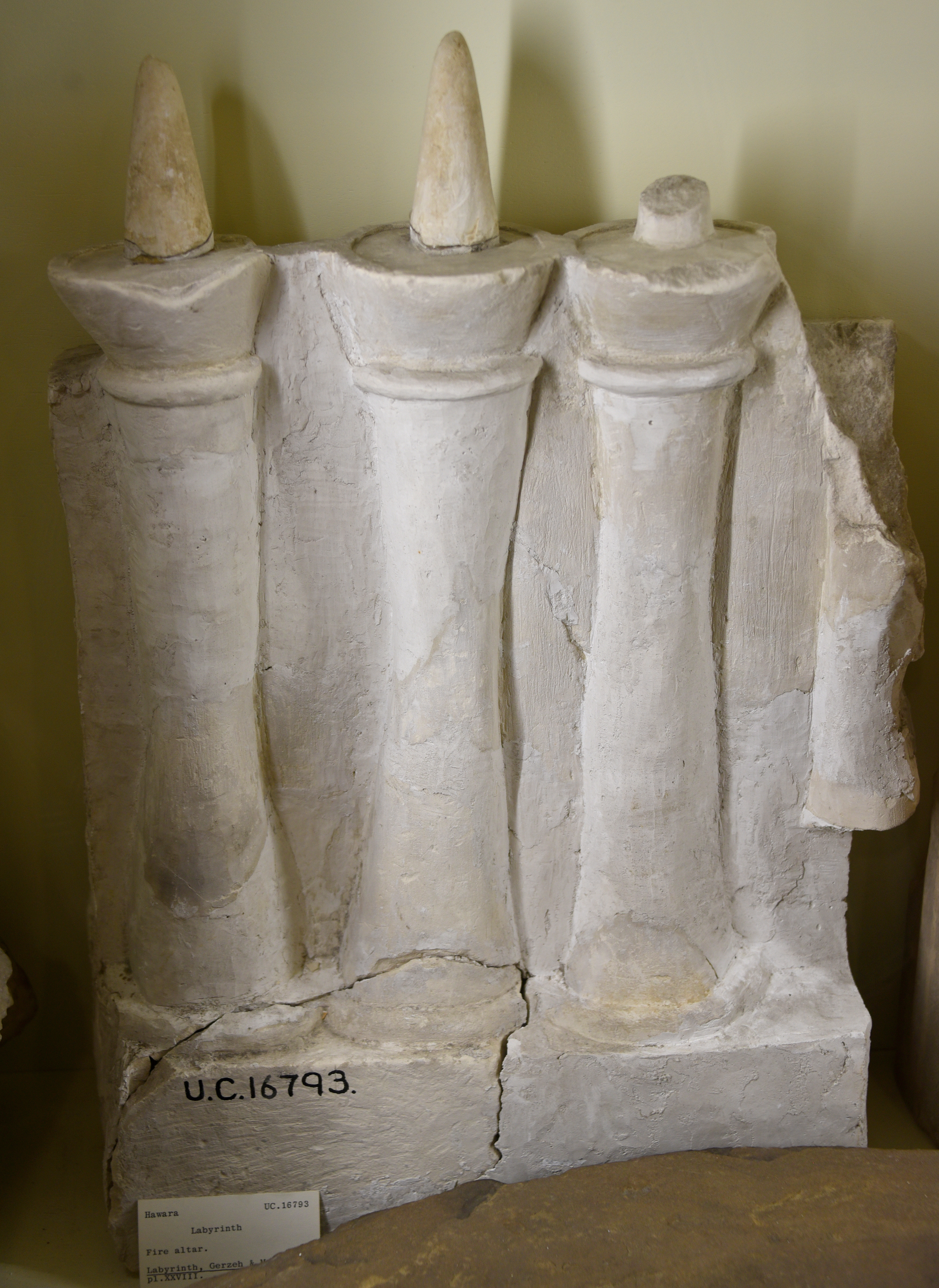
Labyrinth, fire altar. Part of a limestone frieze, model of lamps on a stand. 12th Dynasty. From Hawara, Fayum, Egypt. Petrie Museum, London.

Amenemhat III was the last powerful ruler of the 12th Dynasty, and the pyramid he built at Hawara is believed to post-date the so-called "Black Pyramid" built by the same ruler at Dahshur. This is believed to have been Amenemhat's final resting place. At Hawara there was also the intact (pyramid) tomb of Neferuptah, daughter of Amenemhat III. This tomb was found around 2 km south of the king's pyramid.

In common with the Middle Kingdom pyramids constructed after Amenemhat II, it was built of mudbrick round a core of limestone passages and burial chambers, and faced with limestone. Most of the facing stone was later pillaged for use in other buildings— a fate common to almost all of Egypt's pyramids— and today the pyramid is little more than an eroded, vaguely pyramidal mountain of mud brick, and of the once magnificent mortuary temple precinct formerly enclosed by a wall there is little left beyond the foundation bed of compacted sand and chips and shards of limestone.

The huge mortuary temple that originally stood adjacent to this pyramid is believed to have formed the basis of the complex of buildings with galleries and courtyards called the "Labyrinth" by Herodotus; this building was also mentioned by Strabo and Diodorus Siculus. (There is no historicity to the assertion of Diodorus Siculus that this was the model for the labyrinth of Crete that Greeks imagined housed the Minotaur.)

The demolition of the "labyrinth" may date in part to the reign of Ptolemy II, under whom the Pharaonic city of Shedyt (Greek Crocodilopolis, the modern Medinet el-Fayum) was renamed to honour his sister-wife Arsinoë; a massive Ptolemaic building program at Arsinoë has been suggested as the ultimate destination of Middle Kingdom limestone columns and blocks removed from Hawara, and now lost.

Pharaoh Sobekneferu of the 12th Dynasty also built at the complex. Her name meant "most beautiful of Sobek", the sacred crocodile.

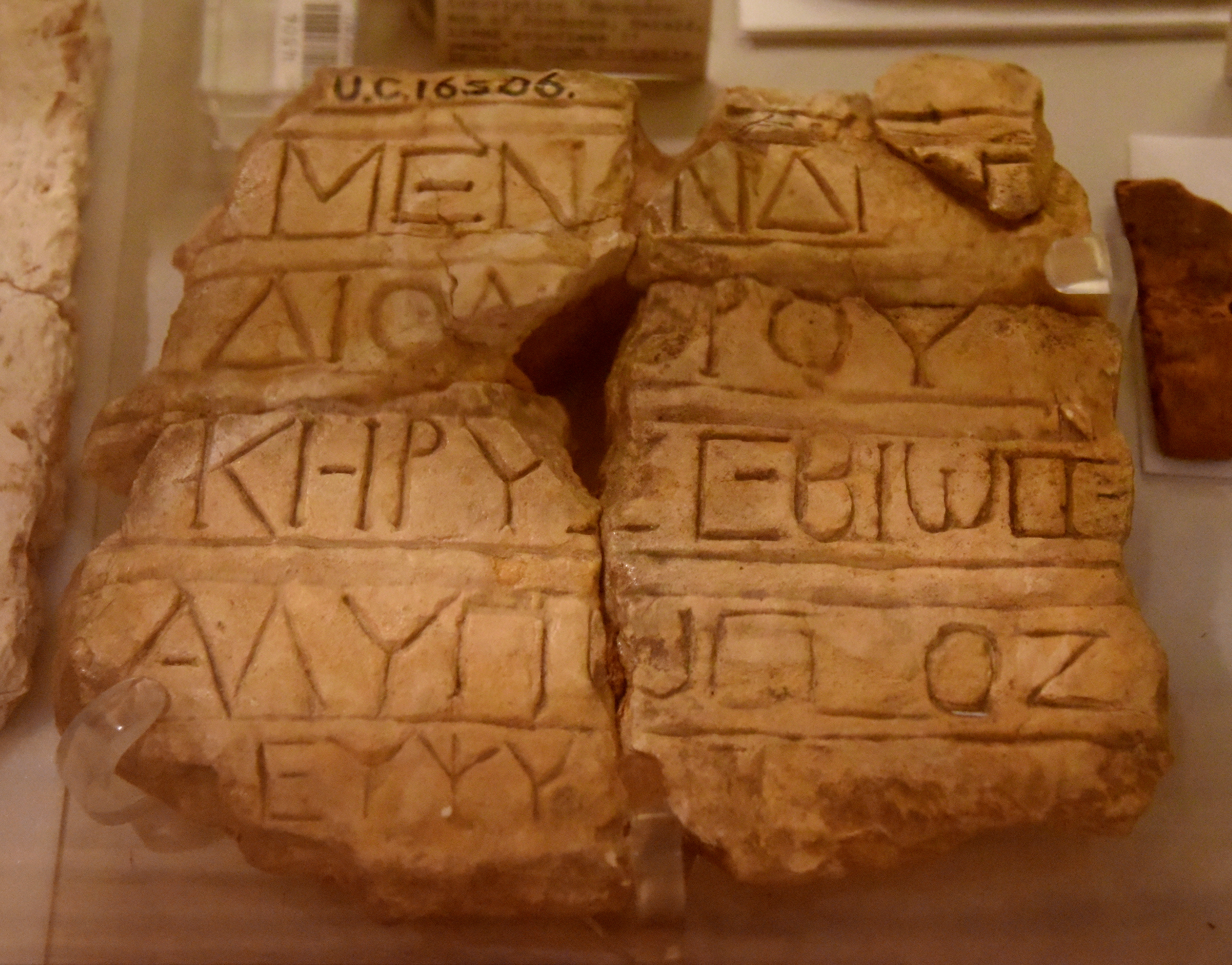
Tombstone inscribed in Greek Uncial script. Limestone, 4 fragments. From Hawara, Fayum, Egypt. Petrie Museum, London.

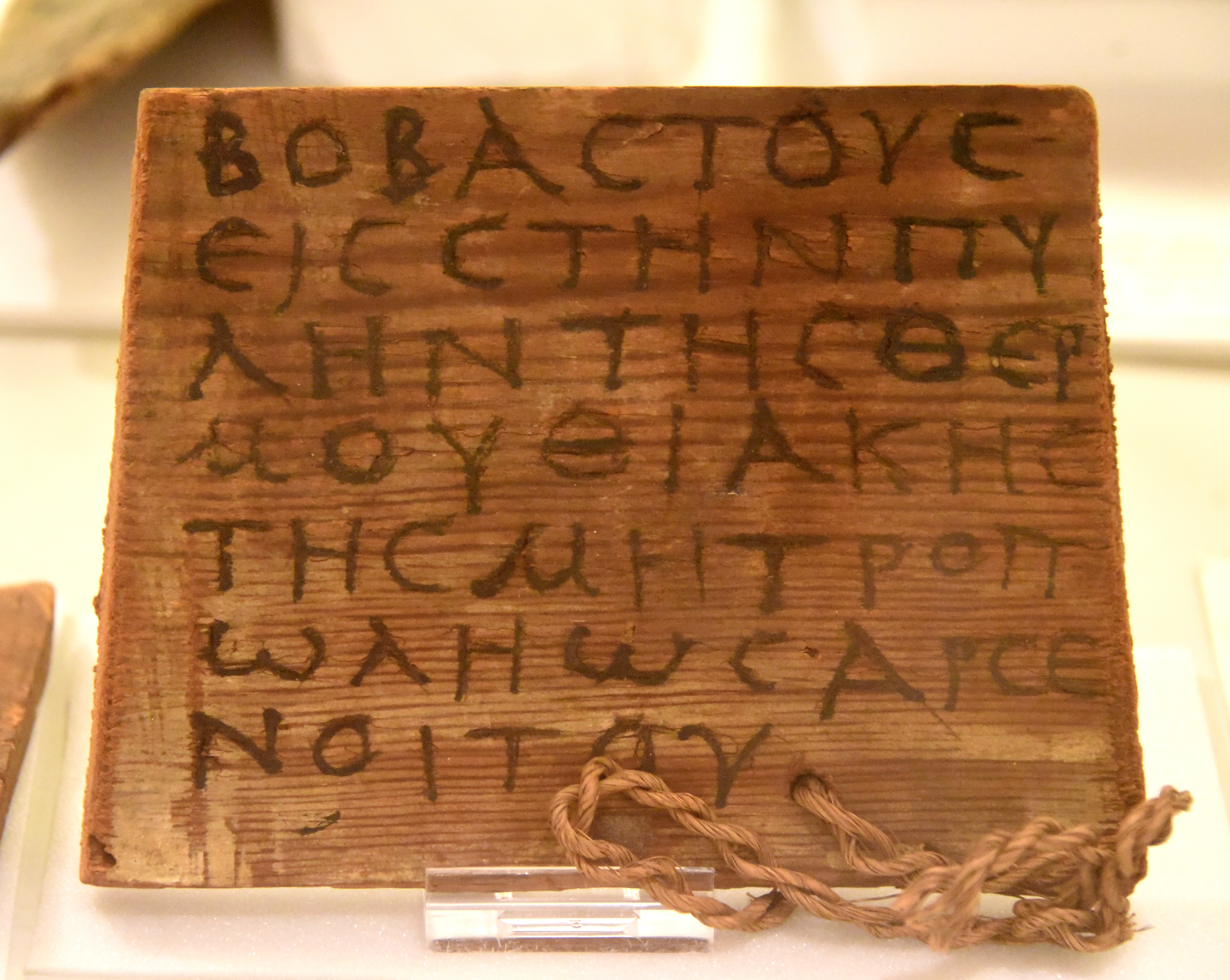
This wooden mummy label was inscribed in black ink. The original cord is still in situ. Roman Period. From Hawara, Fayum, Egypt. Petrie Museum, London.

== Pyramid ==
From the pyramid entrance a sloping passageway with steps runs down to a small room and a further short horizontal passage. In the roof of this horizontal passage there was a concealed sliding trapdoor weighing 20 tons. If this was found and opened, a robber would find himself confronted by an empty passage at a right angle to the passage below, closed by wooden doors, or by a passage parallel to the passage below, carefully filled with mud and stone blocking. He would assume that the blocking concealed the entrance and waste time removing it (thereby increasing the likelihood of detection by the pyramid guardians).

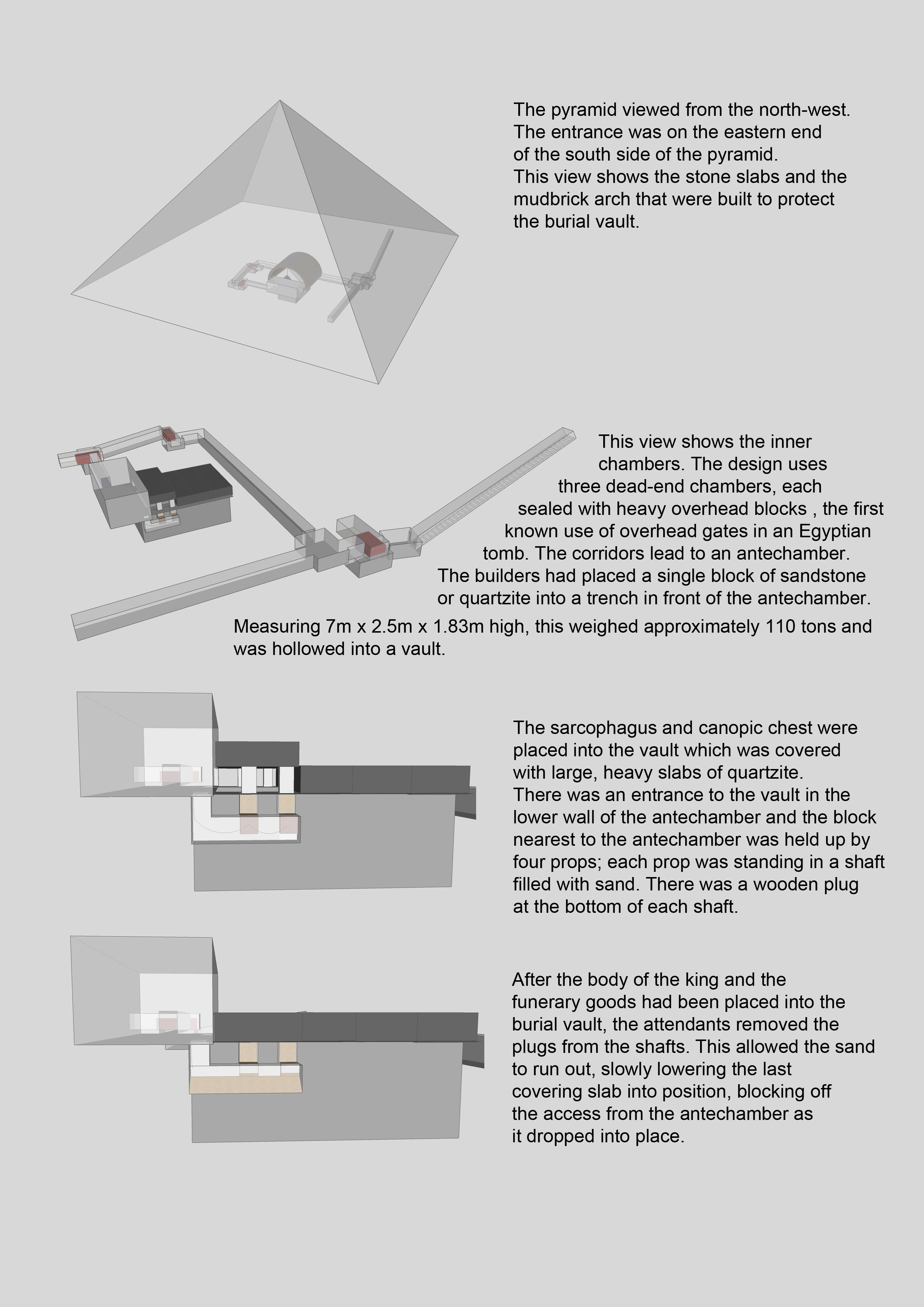
An annotated model of the interior of Amenemhat III's pyramid

There was a second 20-ton trapdoor in the roof of the empty passage, giving onto a second empty passage, also at a right angle to the first. This too had a 20-ton trapdoor giving onto a passage at a right angle to its predecessor (thus the interior of the pyramid was circled by these passages). However this passage ended in a large area of mud and stone blocking that presumably concealed the burial chamber.

This, however, was a blind and merely filled a wide but shallow alcove. Two blind shafts in the floor, carefully filled with cut stone blocks, further wasted the robbers' time, for the real entrance to the burial chamber was even more carefully concealed and lay between the blind shafts and opposite the alcove.

Despite these elaborate protective measures, Petrie found that none of the trapdoors had been slid into place and the wooden doors were open. Whether this indicated negligence on the part of the burial party, an intention to return and place further burials in the pyramid (when found there were two sarcophagi in the quartzite monolith described below and room for at least two more), or a deliberate action to facilitate robbery of the tomb, we cannot know.

The burial chamber was made out of a single quartzite monolith which was lowered into a larger chamber lined with limestone. This monolithic slab weighed an estimated 110 tons according to Petrie. A course of brick was placed on the chamber to raise the ceiling then the chamber was covered with 3 quartzite slabs (estimated weight 45 tons each). Above the burial chamber were 2 relieving chambers. This was topped with 50 ton limestone slabs forming a pointed roof. Then an enormous arch of brick 3 feet thick was built over the pointed roof to support the core of the pyramid. When Petrie excavated the burial chamber, he found a bead of lapis lazuli for inlaying, burned bone fragments, burned wood, and charcoal, suggesting that tomb robbers had burned the wooden coffins and mummy of the pharaoh.

The entrance to the pyramid is today flooded to a depth of 6 metres as a result of the waters from the Abdul Wahbi canal (an offshoot of the Bahr Yussef canal), which flows around two sides of the site and passes within 30m of the pyramid.

== Excavations ==
The labyrinth was first located in modern times by Karl Lepsius, in 1843. William Petrie excavated at Hawara, in 1888, finding papyri of the 1st and 2nd centuries AD, and, north of the pyramid, a vast necropolis where he found 146 portraits on coffins dating to the Roman period—famed to be among the very few surviving examples of painted portraits from classical antiquity—the "Fayum" mummy portraits of Roman Egypt. Among the discoveries made by Petrie were papyrus manuscripts, including a great papyrus scroll which contained parts of books 1 and 2 of the Iliad (the "Hawara Homer" of the Bodleian Library, Oxford).

Petrie's first excavation at Hawara can be retraced in four, overlapping phases. Phase 1 was the excavation of the Pyramid of Amenemhat III itself (not to be confused with the Black Pyramid). Petrie initially wanted to tunnel into the pyramid's center, but once the excavation teams realized the enormity of this task, this work was ultimately postponed until 1889. Phase 2, a survey of the "Site of the Labyrinth," was cut short after Petrie and his team made only limited discoveries. The excavation's resources were then redirected to further exploring the pyramid and the surrounding tombs.

Phase 3 began after a painted portrait was discovered in the "Scattered Tombs", north of the pyramid. Petrie was quick to realize the worth of this object: "If we can get one or two a week," Petrie noted in his journal, "we shall be well repaid." Petrie was also interested in any potential eugenic interpretations of the artifacts, and so he wrote a letter to fellow eugenicist, Francis Galton, discussing his findings. After increasing pressure from competition posed by other antiquities dealers, Petrie finally finished excavating both the pyramid and the northern cemetery. Phase 4 entailed the excavation of the "very promising" "Crocodile Tomb-Chapels", north-east of the pyramid.

== See also ==
- Labyrinth of Egypt
- List of Egyptian pyramids
- List of megalithic sites
