= Sargon =

Sargon may refer to:

== Mesopotamian kings ==
- Sargon of Akkad (r. c. 2334–2279 BC), founder of the Akkadian Empire
- Sargon I (r. c. 1920–1881 BC), king of the Old Assyrian city-state
- Sargon II (r. 722–705 BC), king of the Neo-Assyrian Empire

== Modern people ==
=== Given name ===
- Sargon Boulus (1944–2007), Assyrian-Iraqi poet
- Sargon Dadesho (born 1948), Assyrian nationalist
- Sargon Duran (born 1987), Assyrian Austrian football player
- Sargon Gabriel (born 1947), Assyrian folk music singer

=== Surname ===
- Brett Sargon (born 1991), New Zealand curler
- Cindy Sargon, Assyrian Australian TV chef
- Simon Sargon (1938–2022), Assyrian American composer and professor

=== Nickname ===
- Carl Benjamin, British political commentator and YouTuber known as Sargon of Akkad

== Characters ==
- Sargon the Sorcerer, a comic superhero character from DC Comics, first appeared in 1941
- Sargon, a disembodied alien leader in the 1968 Star Trek episode "Return to Tomorrow"
- Sargon, a character in Daniel Pinkwater's 1982 novel Slaves of Spiegel
- One of the Titans in the 2019 film Godzilla: King of the Monsters
- The player character in the 2024 action-adventure video game Prince of Persia: The Lost Crown

== Other uses ==
- Sargon (chess), a 1978 computer game series
- Sargon (beetle), a genus of beetles in the tribe tropiphorini
- Sargon Stele, Assyrian royal stele found on Cyprus in 1845
- Sargonid dynasty, Assyrian royal dynasty
- Dur-Sharrukin (meaning 'city of Sargon), Assyrian city of the Neo-Assyrian Empire (911-605 BC)
