= Ignacy Żagiell =

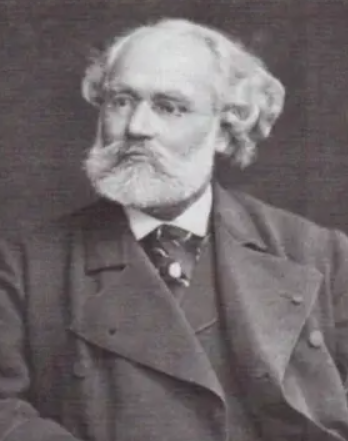
- Born: 14 February 1826; Pavirinčiai or Kelpšiškiai, Russian Empire
- Died: 21 June 1891 (aged 65); Vilnius or Warsaw, Russian Empire
- Education: University of Kyiv
- Occupations: Physician, traveler, writer

Ignacy Żagiell (Lithuanian: Ignotas Žagelis; 14 February 1826 - 21 June 1891) was a physician, traveler, and Polish-language writer descended from Lithuanian nobility.

== Life ==
Ignacy Żagiell was born 14 February 1826 either at the manor of Pavirinčiai or at Kelpšiškiai, then part of the Russian Empire. (Żagiell's brother Adam became a poet.)

Ignacy attended school at Ukmergė and studied medicine at the University of Kyiv, graduating in 1850.

After briefly working as a physician in Odessa, Żagiell traveled to western Europe, where he continued broadening his knowledge of medicine in Paris, Berlin, Dresden, Prague, and Vienna. In 1856 he obtained a doctorate in Paris.

From 1859, Żagiell worked as an army physician in Great Britain, briefly studying at Oxford and Paris. A famous ophthalmologist, Żagiell was made an honorary fellow of Oxford University.

After joining the British Army, he traveled to India, and from 1860 lived in Egypt, where he was ophthalmologist at the court of Sa'id of Egypt. He participated in excavations at Thebes and Karnak with Egyptologist Michał Tyszkiewicz.

From 1864, Żagiell worked as a civilian physician in Turkey.

in 1876 he returned to Lithuania, living in Vilnius, and became the city's sanitary-commission president. He married Countess Maria Broel-Pliater, with whom he had two sons.

Żagiell died 21 June 1891 either in Warsaw or in Vilnius.

== Works ==
- Historja starożytnego Egiptu (History of Ancient Egypt, 1880);
- Podróż historyczna po Abissynii, Adel, Szoa, Nubii, u źródeł Nilu, z opisaniem jego wodospadów, oraz po krajach podrównikowych; do Mekki i Medyny, Syryi i Palestyny, Konstantynopolu i po Archipelagu (1884; reprint published in 2012; some of the descriptions in this book are probably not authentic).

== See also ==
- List of Poles
- Pharaoh (1895 historical novel by Bolesław Prus) drew on Żagiell's History of Ancient Egypt).
