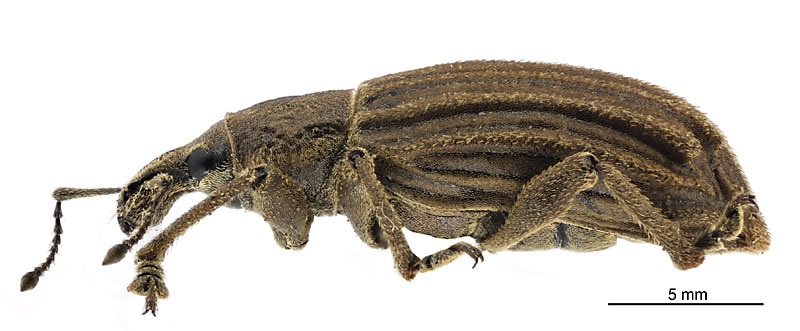
- Sargon carinatus

Scientific classification
- Kingdom: Animalia
- Phylum: Arthropoda
- Class: Insecta
- Order: Coleoptera
- Suborder: Polyphaga
- Infraorder: Cucujiformia
- Family: Curculionidae
- Genus: Sargon; Broun, 1903

= Sargon (beetle) =

Genus of beetles

Sargon is a genus of true weevils in the family of beetles known as Curculionidae. There are at least two described species in Sargon.

== Species ==
These two species belong to the genus Sargon:

- Sargon carinatus Broun, 1903^{c g}
- Sargon hudsoni Broun, 1909^{c g}

Data sources: i = ITIS, c = Catalogue of Life, g = GBIF, b = Bugguide.net
