= History of the Polish–Lithuanian Commonwealth (1648–1764) =

The history of the Polish–Lithuanian Commonwealth (1648–1764) covers a period in the history of the Kingdom of Poland and the Grand Duchy of Lithuania, from the time their joint state became the theater of wars and invasions fought on a great scale in the middle of the 17th century, to the time just before the election of Stanisław August Poniatowski, the last king of the Polish–Lithuanian Commonwealth and its partitioning.

From the 17th century, the nobles' democracy, experienced devastating wars and fell into internal disorder and then anarchy, and as a result declined. The once powerful Commonwealth had become vulnerable to internal warfare and foreign intervention. In 1648 the Cossack Khmelnytsky Uprising engulfed the south and east of the vast Polish–Lithuanian state, and was soon followed by a Swedish invasion, which raged through core Polish lands. Warfare with the Cossacks and Russia left Ukraine divided; the eastern part, lost by the Commonwealth, became a dependency of the Tsardom of Russia. John III Sobieski, who fought protracted wars against the Ottoman Empire, revived the Commonwealth's military might once more. In one decisive engagement he helped in 1683 to deliver Vienna from a Turkish onslaught.

Further disintegration followed nevertheless. The Commonwealth, subjected to almost constant warfare until 1720, suffered devastating population losses and massive damage to its economy and social structure. The economic regression had not been fully compensated for the duration of the Commonwealth's existence. The government became ineffective because of large scale internal conflicts (e.g. Lubomirski's Rokosz against John II Casimir and rebellious confederations), corrupted legislative processes (such as the infamous use of the liberum veto) and manipulation by foreign interests. The nobility class fell under the control of a handful of powerful families with established territorial domains, the urban population and infrastructure fell into ruin, together with most peasant farms.

The reigns of two kings of the Saxon Wettin dynasty, Augustus II the Strong and Augustus III, brought the Commonwealth more political damage and little meaningful reform. The Great Northern War, a period seen by the contemporaries as a passing eclipse, may have been the decisive blow that critically weakened the Polish-Lithuanian state. The Kingdom of Prussia became a strong regional power and took Silesia from the Habsburg monarchy. The Commonwealth-Saxony personal union, however, gave rise to the emergence of the reform movement in the Commonwealth, and the beginnings of the Polish Enlightenment culture.

== Economic and social decline ==
=== War destruction, economic breakdown, social disintegration ===
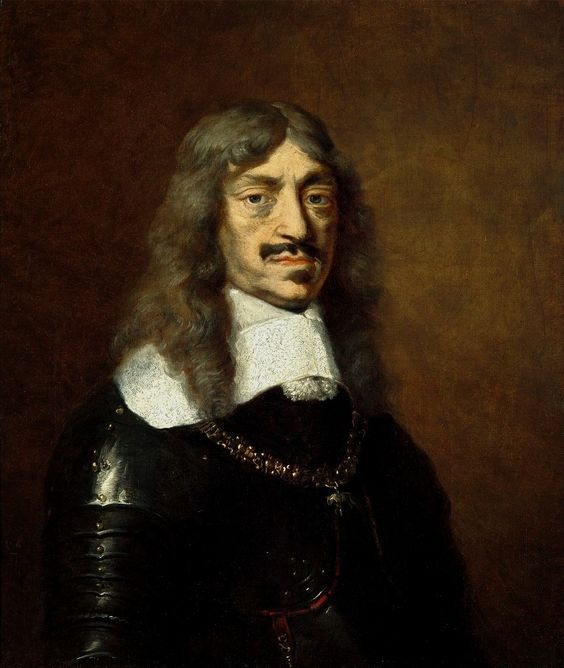
John Casimir, Władysław IV's half brother, was the third and last of the Vasa kings. He was also the last descendant of Władysław Jagiełło on the Polish–Lithuanian throne.

The economic breakdown in the Commonwealth in the second half of the 17th century has often been seen as a result of the destruction of the country caused by wars. There were also other depressing factors present that affected at that time large portions of Europe, to which the manorial, serfdom-based economy of the Commonwealth had tried to adjust. The particular solutions adopted resulted eventually in deterioration of the effectiveness of agricultural practices, lower productivity and pauperization of the rural population. But the degree to which the economic regression in the Commonwealth had progressed had no parallels in the economies of the neighboring countries, some of which practiced the same type of rural economy. While the war destruction that took place during the events of 1655–60 was particularly devastating, the Commonwealth was subjected to constant warfare from 1648 to 1720.

Unlike the previously fought wars, which had affected mostly the peripheries of the huge state, from the mid-17th century onward central Poland was being ravaged by warfare as well. The two Northern Wars turned out particularly destructive. Several massive foreign armies traversed the Commonwealth in the course of the Second Northern War. The protracted role of the country as a battlefield, the quartering of troops and armies, combined with the policy of exacting contributions and pillage during the Great Northern War, greatly deteriorated the economy of the country which had not yet recovered from the damage incurred two generations earlier. Internal warfare and looting by unpaid Commonwealth troops added to the damage.

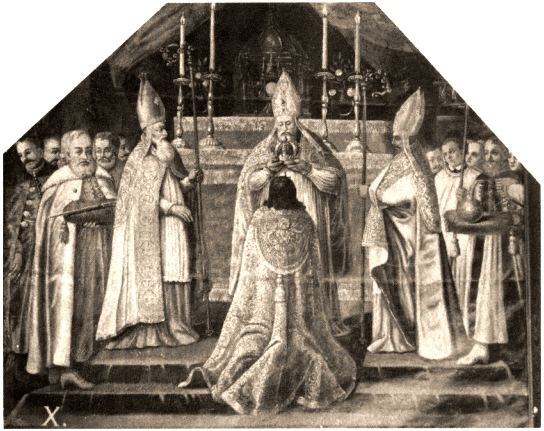
The crowning of John II Casimir Vasa

The destruction and depletion of resources applied to all segments of the society, affecting rural villages, cities and towns, of which many had practically lost their urban character. Industry and manufacturing suffered as well as the funds flowing into the state treasury. The war losses and epidemic disease outbreaks (especially during 1659–63) reduced the population by a third to 6–7 million. As the peasants, the townspeople and ordinary szlachta each lost their economic base, the magnate class had become the only social group capable of significant economic and political activity, which led to their more total domination of what was left of the Commonwealth politics.

The war and economic pressures intensified the already present fragmentation processes and class conflicts between the social classes and within each of them. Xenophobia and intolerance became prevalent, different social and territorial groups stressed their separate statuses and traditions. The nation building efforts of Renaissance era reformers was undone.

=== Further stratification among nobility ===
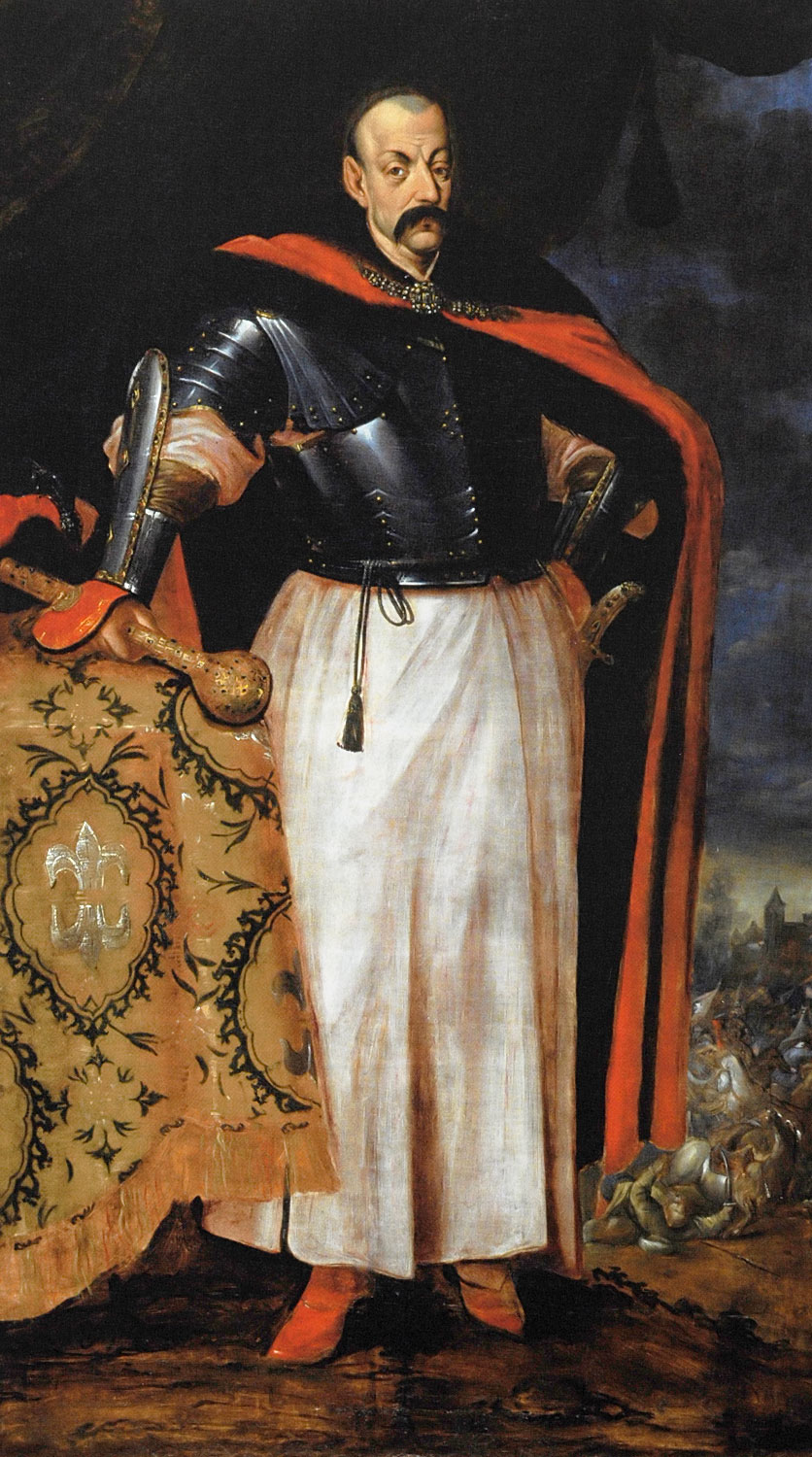
Hetman Michał Kazimierz Pac of Lithuania

The predominant 16th century agricultural production organization, the Szlachta's folwark gave way by the middle of the 17th century to the magnate-owned latifundia, huge networks of landed estates. Latifundia were present throughout the Polish–Lithuanian federation, but developed most extensively in the eastern reaches of the Crown, having expanded in that direction before the Union of Lublin. War destruction affected the diversified magnate possessions to a lesser degree than single estates of middle szlachta, which increasingly turned szlachta into dependent clients of their "elder brothers". Parts of a latifundium were typically leased or run by hired szlachta or urban, often Jewish, hierarchy of administrators, with each layer exploiting the serf laborers. The various aspects of commercial life in the territories, including agriculture, trade, mining, and manufacturing, had previously been controlled by szlachta in a legally protected way. Now, in the more decentralized and anarchistic feudal state, the magnate class was in a position to establish in its state-like domains absolute rule, based not on laws but on practical advantages they enjoyed. The regional authority and power that the magnates attained was exerted by a variety of means, including private military forces.

The increased dominance of the magnates negatively affected the class integrity of the so far crucially important middle szlachta stratum. The fragmentation of szlachta deepened the decentralizing tendencies in the large state. The magnates established networks of szlachta supporters and national loyalty was being replaced with loyalty based on regional ties, as for the nobility the weak state institutions provided neither attractive career opportunities, nor sufficient protection.

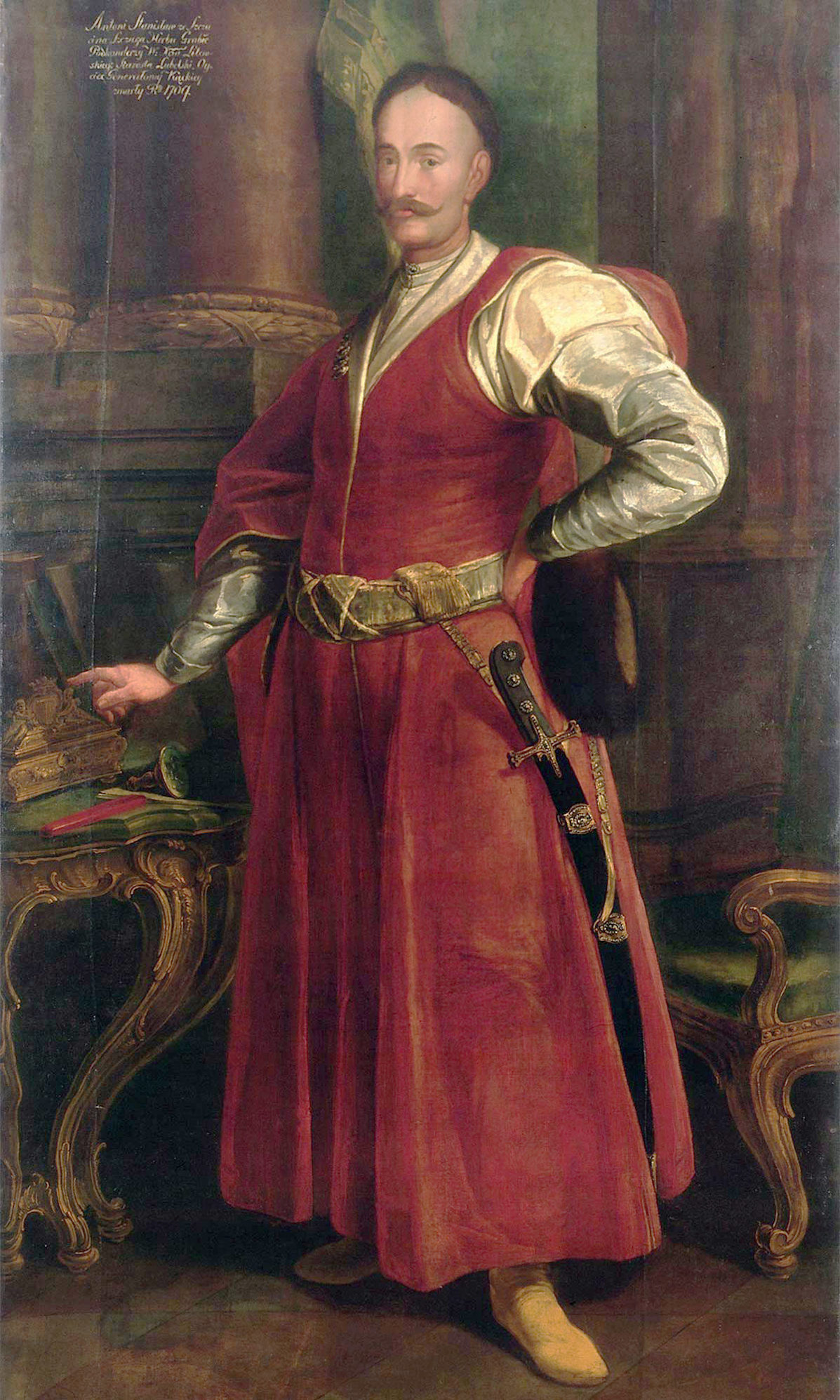
Stanisław Antoni Szczuka, a member of szlachta, was a political publicist

The magnate control over the lesser or petty szlachta (szlachta zaściankowa), a group whose members possessed little or no property and were poorly educated, has long been recognized. The lesser szlachta was useful, as it provided crowds of armed men able to influence various public events, such as sejmiks or elections, according to directions given. Most commonly the basic "clientele" of the magnates constituted the lowest ranked nobles, czynszownicy (renters), free but landless and poor, whose status in reality resembled that of the peasants: they were completely dependent on a wealthy patron. The brukowcy (pavement people) had no property and engaged in a variety of trades. Domestic szlachta functioned as servants in magnate family households. Szlachta zaściankowa proper, or zagrodowa (homestead people) was the very numerous propertied petty nobility; among the lower ranks they alone enjoyed something of a, at least symbolic, privileged noble status.

Of fundamentally greater importance was the role of the middle nobility, propertied and better qualified people, able to pursue careers within magnate courts, or assume public offices obtained with the help of their magnate benefactors. The noblemen in question, through the magnates they served, experienced also material gains, such as profitable land leases, and legal protection in times of common and often reckless and disruptive litigation.

The magnates themselves or magnate clans formed groupings, or factions, with common regional or other interests. In the 17th century, the factions were usually confined to a region, such as the Lithuanian cliques of the Pac or Sapieha families. In the 18th century, the Czartoryskis and the Potockis established Commonwealth-wide magnate factions of great importance.

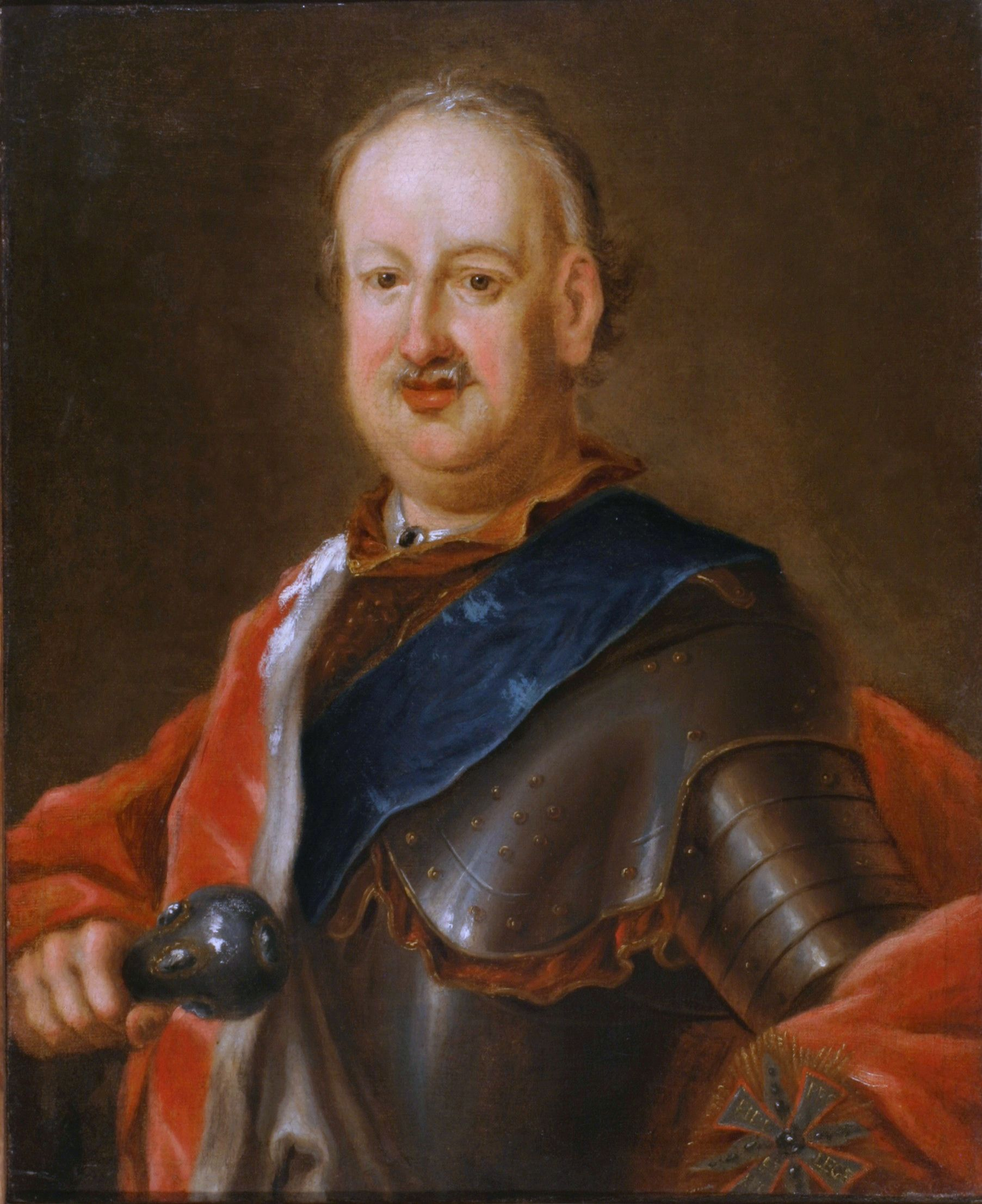
Michał Kazimierz Radziwiłł represented the great Lithuanian Radziwiłł magnate family

The subordination to magnate interests took place not without some resistance, but the various szlachta movements lacked coordination and in the first half of the 18th century the middle nobility ceased being an independent force in national politics.

The lack of legal distinction among various ranks of the nobility gave many noblemen a false sense of equality and opportunity. The majority of the nobility of the Lithuanian, Ruthenian, or German origin, had become Polonized and Catholic. Some minority Protestant nobility remained active in Royal Prussia and Greater Poland. After the triumph of the Counter-Reformation, the Jesuits and other Catholic educators lost incentives to provide competitive high-quality education. The backward mentality and close-mindedness of the szlachta masses has become proverbial, and as the nation experienced its greatest decline, the typically uniform szlachta indulged in the sarmatism ideology of a chosen nation and contempt for everything foreign. Nonconformity was not tolerated, corruption was at its highest, while public morale at the lowest.

Among the more worldly of the magnates, influenced by foreign elements in the Commonwealth's royal courts and West European currents, admiration of foreign (often French and German) ways and fashions was becoming increasingly common. The magnates built splendid palaces of brick and stone in the main cities and on their rural estates; the wooden manors and feasting social life style of the szlachta attempted to imitate the surroundings and lives of the rich, famous and powerful.

=== Agricultural regression and peasantry ===
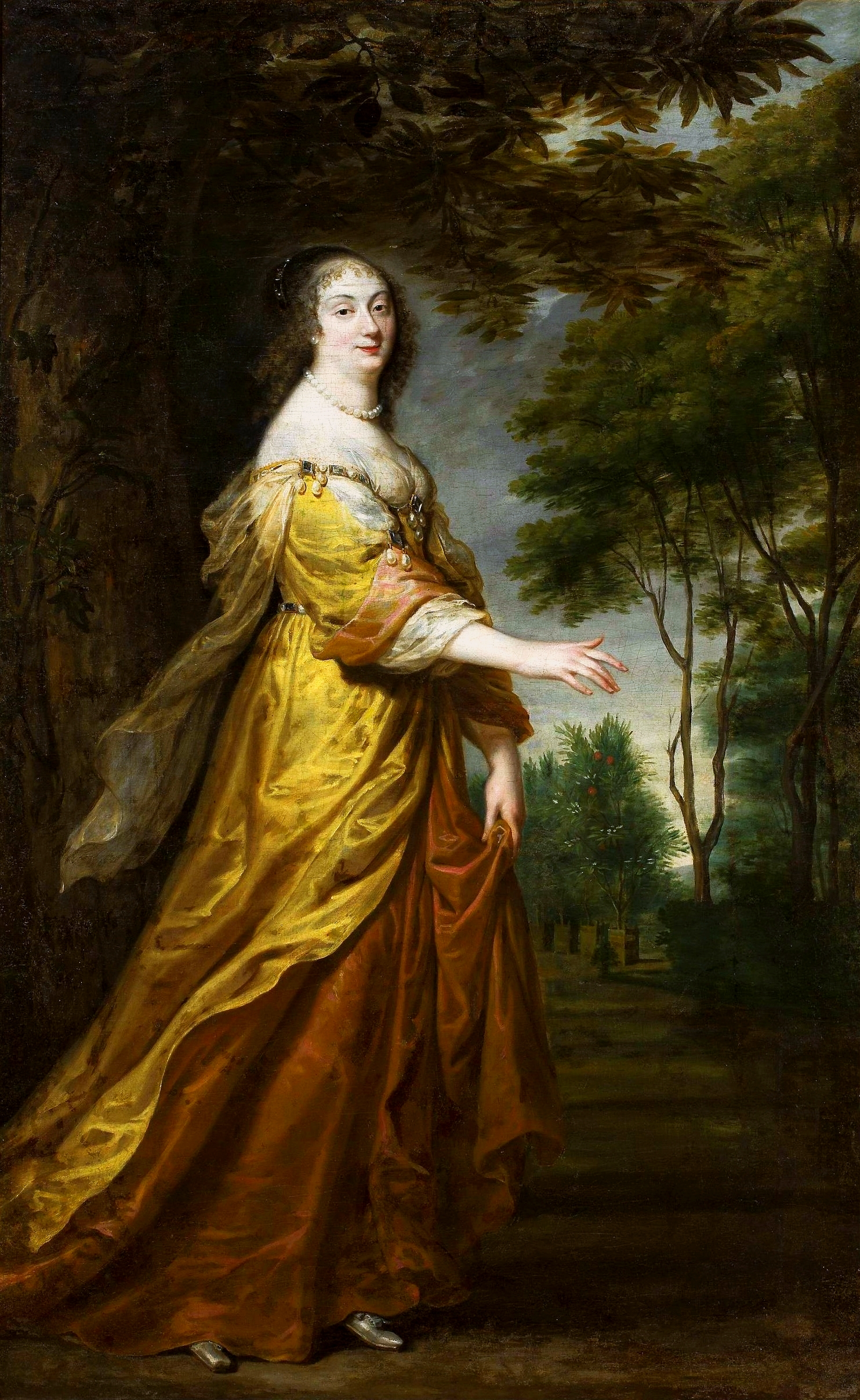
Ludwika Maria (Marie Louise) Gonzaga was the wife of Władysław IV and then of John Casimir, whom she strongly influenced

The deep agricultural crisis lasted from the 1650s through the 1720s. Under the plight of constant warfare and adverse economic conditions the peasants were being increasingly burdened with excessive obligations. Their communities suffered population losses and many villages disappeared altogether. The serf labor force was displaced and their plots taken over under estate consolidation schemes (to further increase the already dominant folwark portion of the rural economy), or manorial duties were replaced by feudal rent arrangements if that seemed more profitable to landlords. Those and many other measures amounting to extreme exploitation and imposition of hardship had not resulted in increased production, but rather made the crisis more acute by ruining the peasant farming operation. Not all the regions suffered equally, as northern Poland's (Gdańsk Pomerania and Greater Poland) agriculture maintained moderate profitability, while southern Poland (Lesser Poland) experienced the greatest rural decline, and correspondingly the greatest decrease in the percentage of farms under peasant family hereditary holding.^{[d]}

After the Khmelnytsky Uprising and the Swedish Deluge, approx. 35% of villages in Royal Prussia and 60% in Podolia were destroyed completely.

The tendency was for each village, or a small cluster of villages, possibly corresponding to a parish, to function as a self-contained organism, arbitrarily ruled by the lord's administrator, with some participation from local self-government, whose continuous existence depended on its degree of cooperativeness. The parish schools taught mostly the catechism with added social indoctrination. The one allowed peasant activity, sometimes even required because of mandatory purchases of such staples as beer form the lord's brewery, was the participation in village tavern life. The taverns provided some entertainment, functioned as outlets for significant folk artistic creativity, and places of occasional contacts with traveling representatives of the largely unknown to the peasants, outside world.

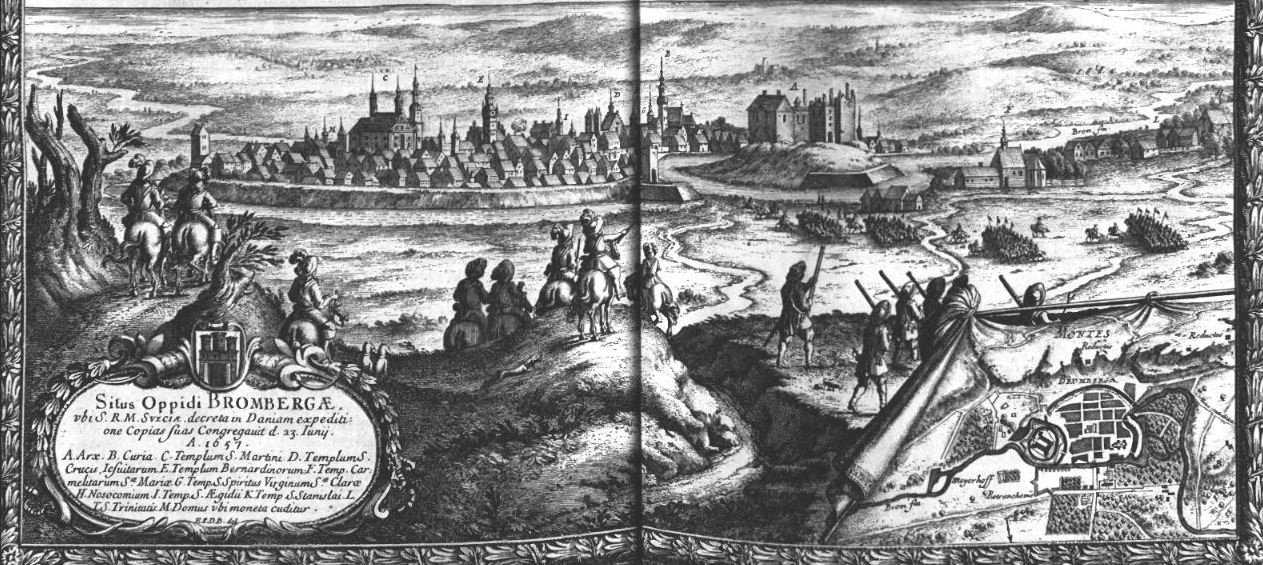
Bydgoszcz (Bromberg) in 1657 by Erik Dahlbergh

Average living conditions in the increasingly impoverished rural villages were very bad and the exploited peasants resorted to various forms of resistance, most often running away from particularly abusive landlords. Some villages or areas engaged in collectively refusing to perform the prescribed duties, or, rarely in ethnically Polish lands, armed rebellions. The Kostka-Napierski Uprising took place in 1651, there were rebellions in the Podhale region in 1670 and in other regions in 1735–38. In Silesia the ethnically Polish peasantry rebelled during 1722–29 and in 1750 around Pszczyna, when the Prussian army was brought to bear. Highway robbery band activity was another form of peasant resistance; some of its leaders, especially from mountainous regions, have become immortalized in folk tales.

On a grand scale peasant armed resistance became a crucial factor in the eastern Ruthenian lands of the Commonwealth, where it combined with Cossack unrest.

=== Disintegration of towns and urban classes ===
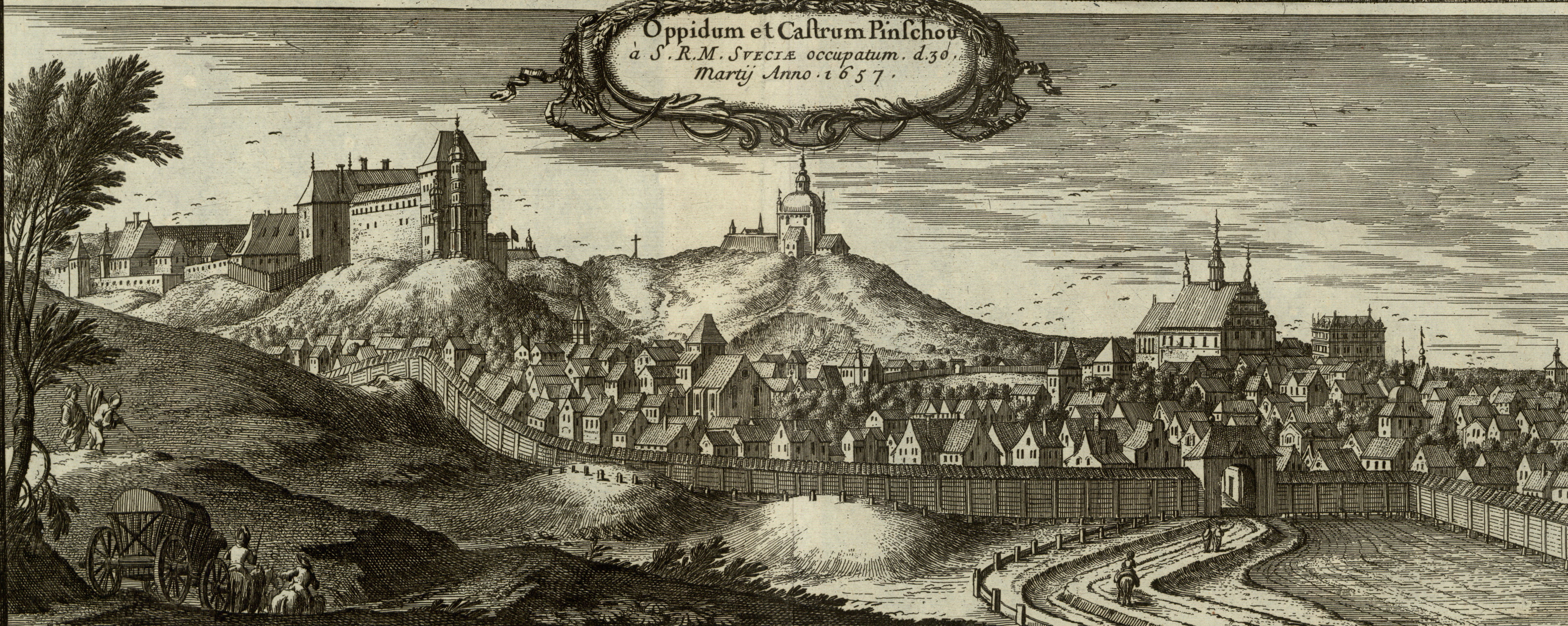
Pińczów, a center of Protestant Reformation activities, was taken over by the Catholic establishment long before this 1657 image was created

The fall of the cities and towns was the most pronounced aspect of the economic breakdown of the Commonwealth. The nascent manifestations of capitalist practices of the Renaissance era were weakened or wiped out, which irreversibly retarded the short- and long-term aspects of economic development in absolute terms or in comparison with Poland's neighbors, or even with Silesia and parts of Pomerania, areas lost by the Crown.

The peasants, who had traditionally constituted a vital part of the town merchants' clientele, now impoverished and forced by their feudal masters to limit their purchases to what was produced or sold within their home estate, largely stopped plying their role in the internal market. The market became confounded further by the monetary crisis, warfare destruction and the fact that some of the most major Poland's and Lithuania's municipal centers were lost to the neighboring states, either permanently or at times of reversals of military fortunes.

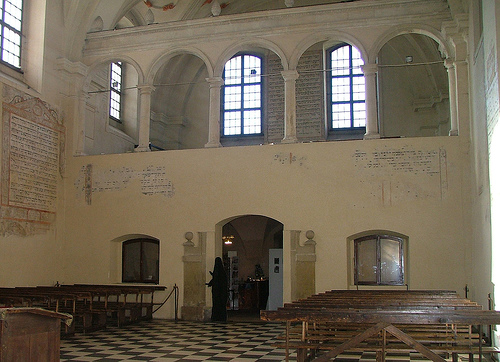
Izaak Synagogue in Kazimierz district of Kraków

The slow rebuilding after 1720 took place unevenly, with some of the largest cities, Warsaw and Danzig (Gdańsk) among them, faring the best, while other like Kraków, reduced to 10 thousand inhabitants, remaining depressed. Most smaller towns suffered badly, except for those in western Greater Poland, where the remarkable ascent of Wschowa took place.

The changes altered the ethnic character of the burgher classes. The peasant influx into towns slowed to a trickle, while the proportion of Jewish inhabitants increased considerably. Of the 750,000 Jews living in the Commonwealth in the middle of the 18th century (other sources give about a million in the 1770s), 3/4 resided in cities, making up almost half of the total urban population. The Jews were very industrious, accepted even marginal profits and soon dominated the crafts and trade, especially in smaller towns. Their communities (Qahal autonomous congregations) conducted extensive credit operations, servicing the Polish middle and upper social strata. Christian townspeople had made at times unsuccessful attempts to limit the commercial rights of the Jews.

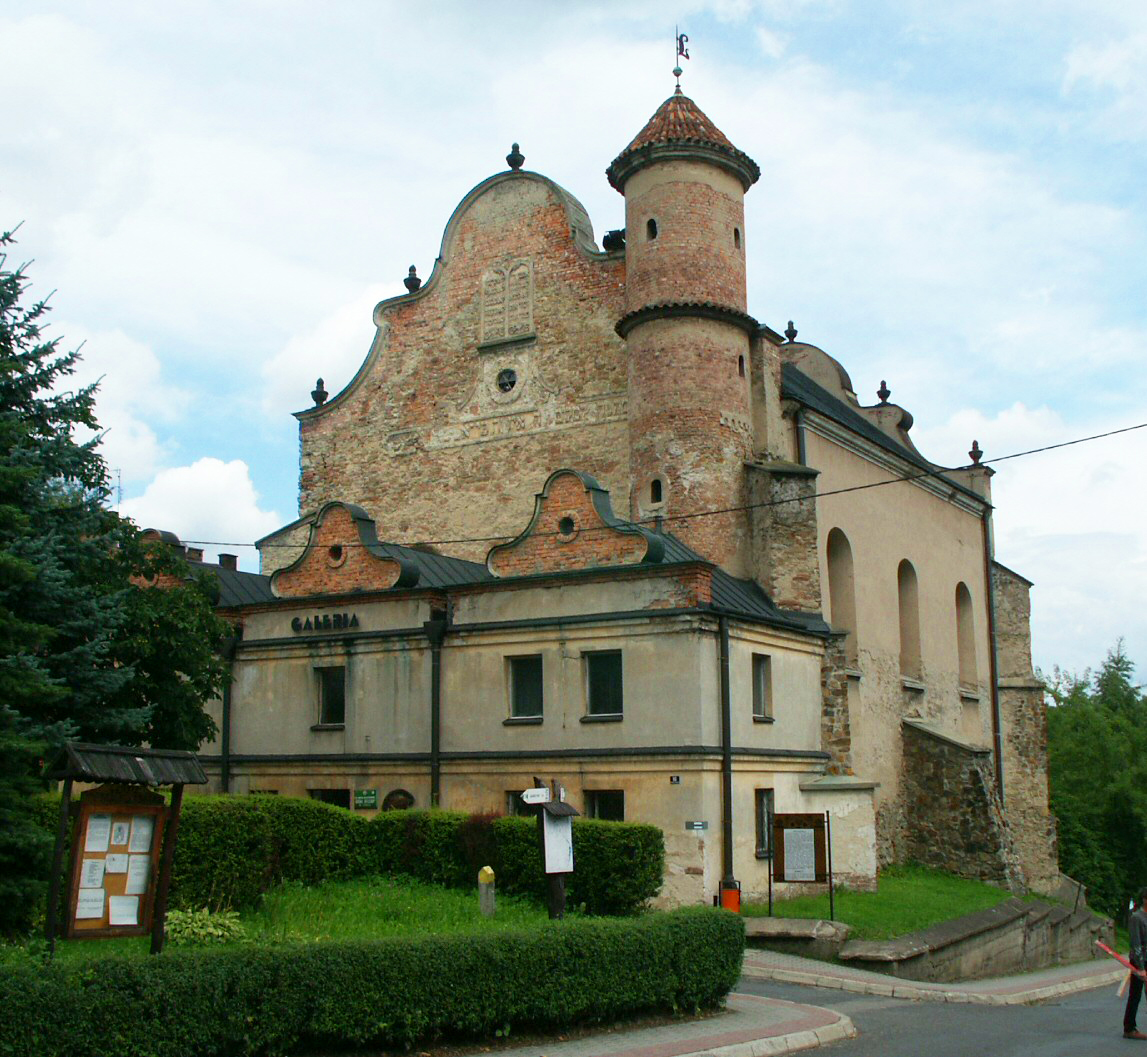
Lesko Synagogue. During the Khmelnytsky Uprising the Jews had suffered disproportionately heavy losses.

Some Polish cities had the de non tolerandis Judaeis "privilege", which meant that they were able to exclude Jews from the area under the town's jurisdiction. Many Jews were often still able to remain within city limits, while others lived in jurydykas, areas typically under feudal jurisdiction outside city walls. Jews also lived in shtetls, their own small countryside towns, existing under protection of a feudal lord. Jews usually functioned under the Jewish court system, subject to noble (sejm mandated) courts in case of conflict with municipal authorities or other Christians and in appellate cases. The spatial separation was only partial and in the Commonwealth there were no formal ghettos. Jewish residents of cities participated in the upkeep of public infrastructure, and made other contributions, including to common military defense.

The weakness of central government prevented an introduction of a uniform statewide economic policy, even as feeble attempts to implement mercantilism and state protectionism (widely then practiced in Europe) were being made. The balance of trade remained negative most of the time, and the country's transit role diminished. The lack of central controls opened the Commonwealth to exploitation by more advanced economies. The monetary crisis and chaotic policy in that area, as well as Frederick the Great's flooding of Poland with fake Polish currency, resulted in massive devaluations and economic losses. With the townspeople increasingly employed in agriculture, where there was demand for labor, the guild crafts and manufacturing, the mainstay of the urban middle class, became reduced to a fraction of its past capacity. However, the Commonwealth was able to preserve or rebuild much of the mining, metallurgy and heavier industries, some of which were important for military applications.

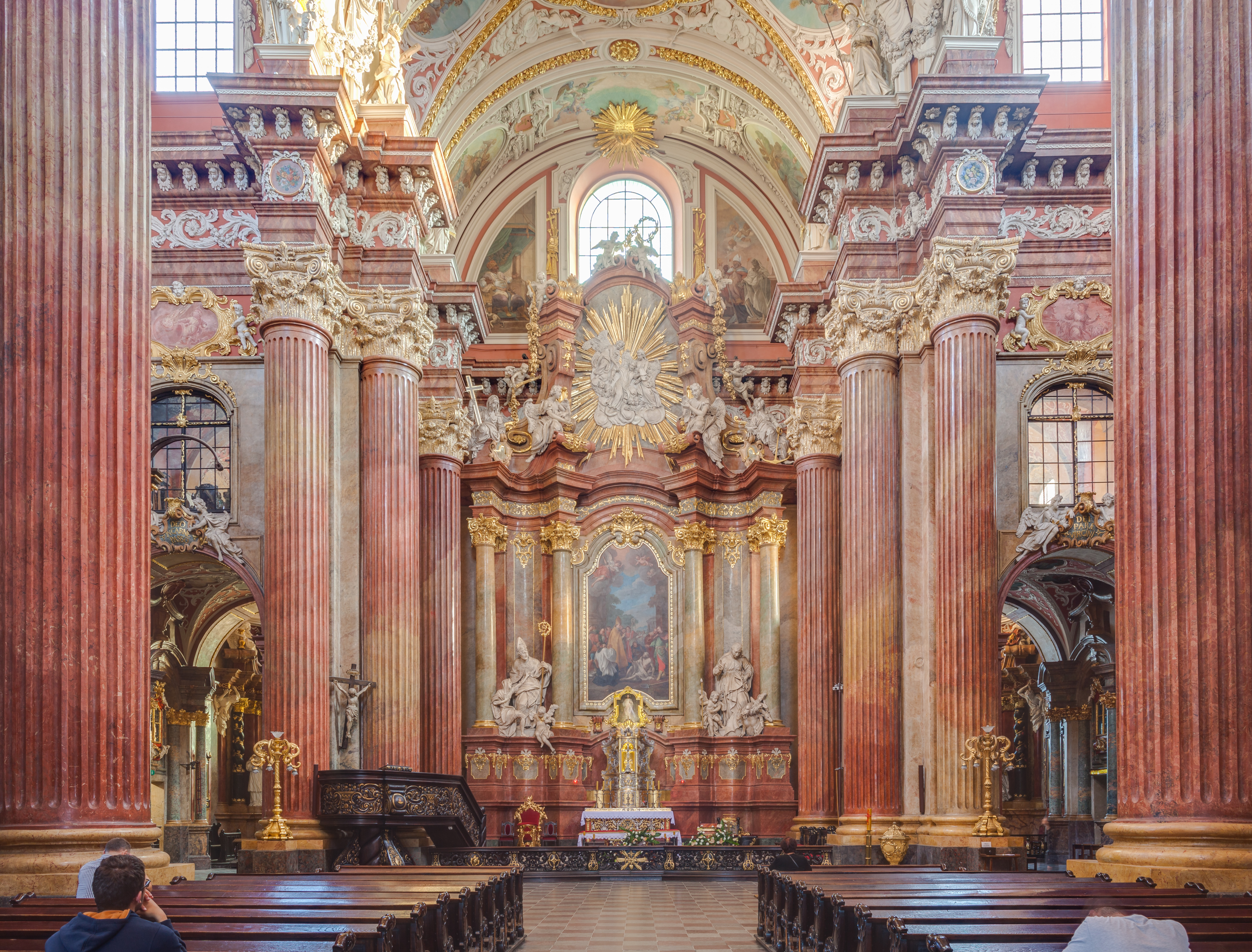
Many lavish Baroque churches were built despite the country's depressed economy (originally Jesuit church in Poznań)

Nationwide the urban classes had become marginalized and lacked influence, as even by the end of the 18th century the population of town residents constituted no more than 15% of the Commonwealth total. Most cities were private, as opposed to "royal" or public, with their inhabitants accordingly subjected to arbitrary obligations imposed by feudal owners. In the 18th century royal city of Kraków, 55% of the grounds within the city walls belonged to the Church, 17% to nobility interests and only the rest to the actual city folks. The degradation of towns was recognized as one of the leading factors contributing to national decline by the more enlightened of szlachta publicists (Garczyński, Fredro, Leszczyński).

The Commonwealth city populations were fragmented on the basis of trade, class, ethnicity, religious affiliation or jurisdiction type and consumed by internal conflicts. The most enterprising and successful of burghers were able to join the ranks of nobility, thus leaving the urban occupations or introducing additional tensions within cities. Townspeople in larger cities, including Danzig, supported with dedication and generosity the national cause during the foreign invasions. The Commonwealth's urban upper layer had lost its previously prominent role in the promotion of cultural advancement, but in Silesia, where Polish gentry no longer existed, Protestant townspeople continued Polish language educational and cultural activities, including literary work and publications, in several cities. Toward the middle of the 18th century the Polish and German burghers of Danzig, Thorn (Toruń) and other municipalities of Royal Prussia were among the pioneers of Polish Enlightenment. The typically parochial climate of ignorance, backwardness and prejudice in many small towns found its expression in a number of witch trials. Many magnate residencies were built and public improvement projects completed in Warsaw during the first half of the 18th century.

=== Beginnings of recovery ===
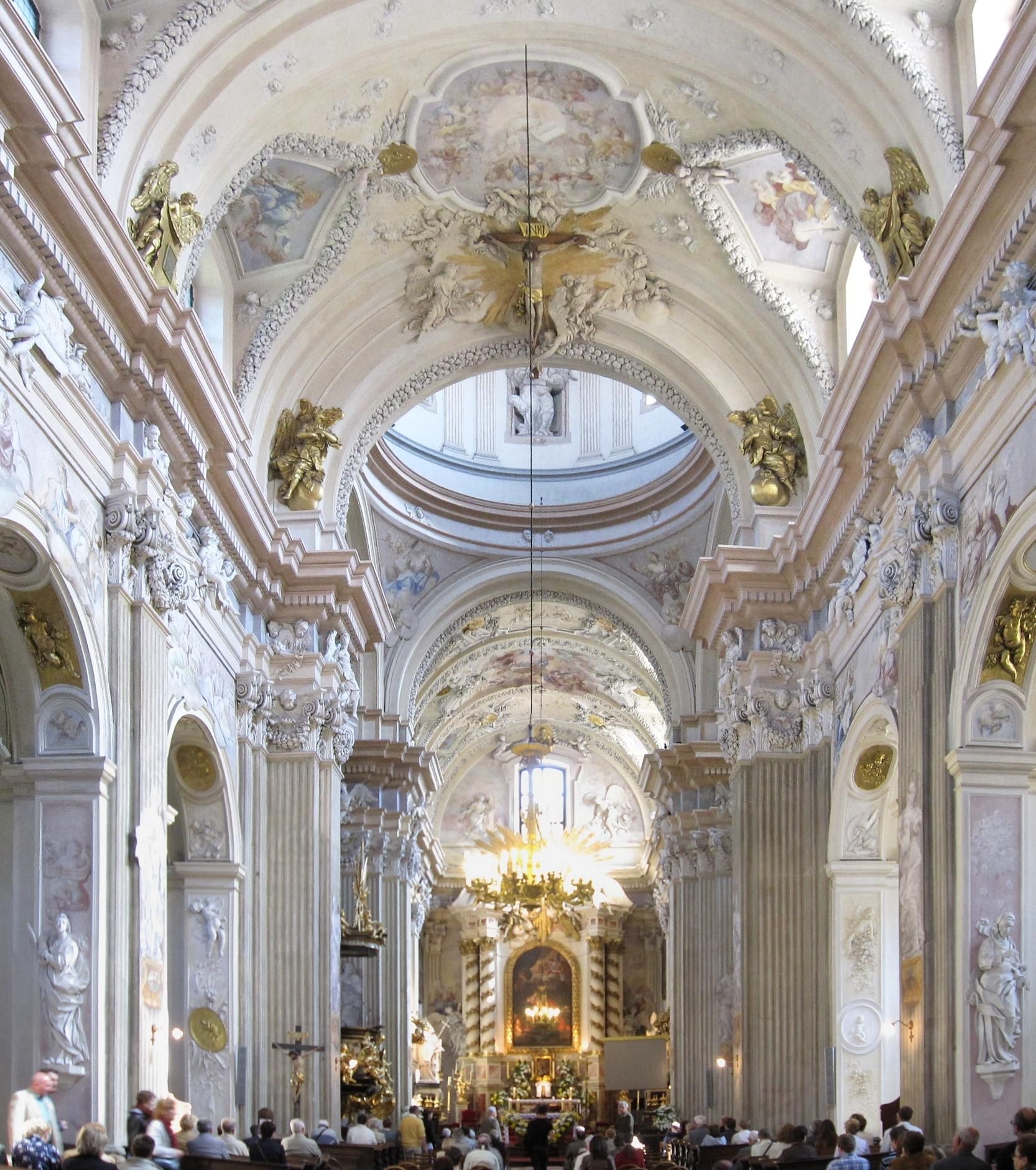
Church of St. Anne, Kraków

The first changes indicating an upcoming economic recovery took place in the 1725–50 period. More clearly visible agricultural and industrial progress occurred during the two following decades (1750–70) and had to do with the improved by that time state of the agricultural market in Europe. During the earlier period some technical advances were made and contributed to improved agriculture and, more importantly, the nature of rural social relations was changing. Beginning in Poznań region and then elsewhere in western Greater Poland and Royal Prussia, the manorial serfdom labor requirements were being replaced with peasant land rentals and owners collecting monetary compensation. This "buying off" of the forced labor obligations was often favored by the peasants themselves, as it improved their financial situation and reconnected them to city markets.

The same two regions and the capital city of Warsaw experienced also a moderate awakening in the area of industrial activities and urban business enterprises. A major trading house was established in Warsaw by French Huguenots in 1723. Manufacturing businesses were created by a number of magnates in various regions. Among the most important was the developing iron industry in southern and central Poland (Old-Polish Industrial Region). These modest signs of industrial progress occurred within the Commonwealth with a nearly half-century delay not only in comparison to Poland's western and southern neighbors, but also with respect to Russia.

== Wars fought to protect territorial integrity, decline of government ==
=== Khmelnytsky Uprising, peasant movements, Cossack alliance with Russia ===
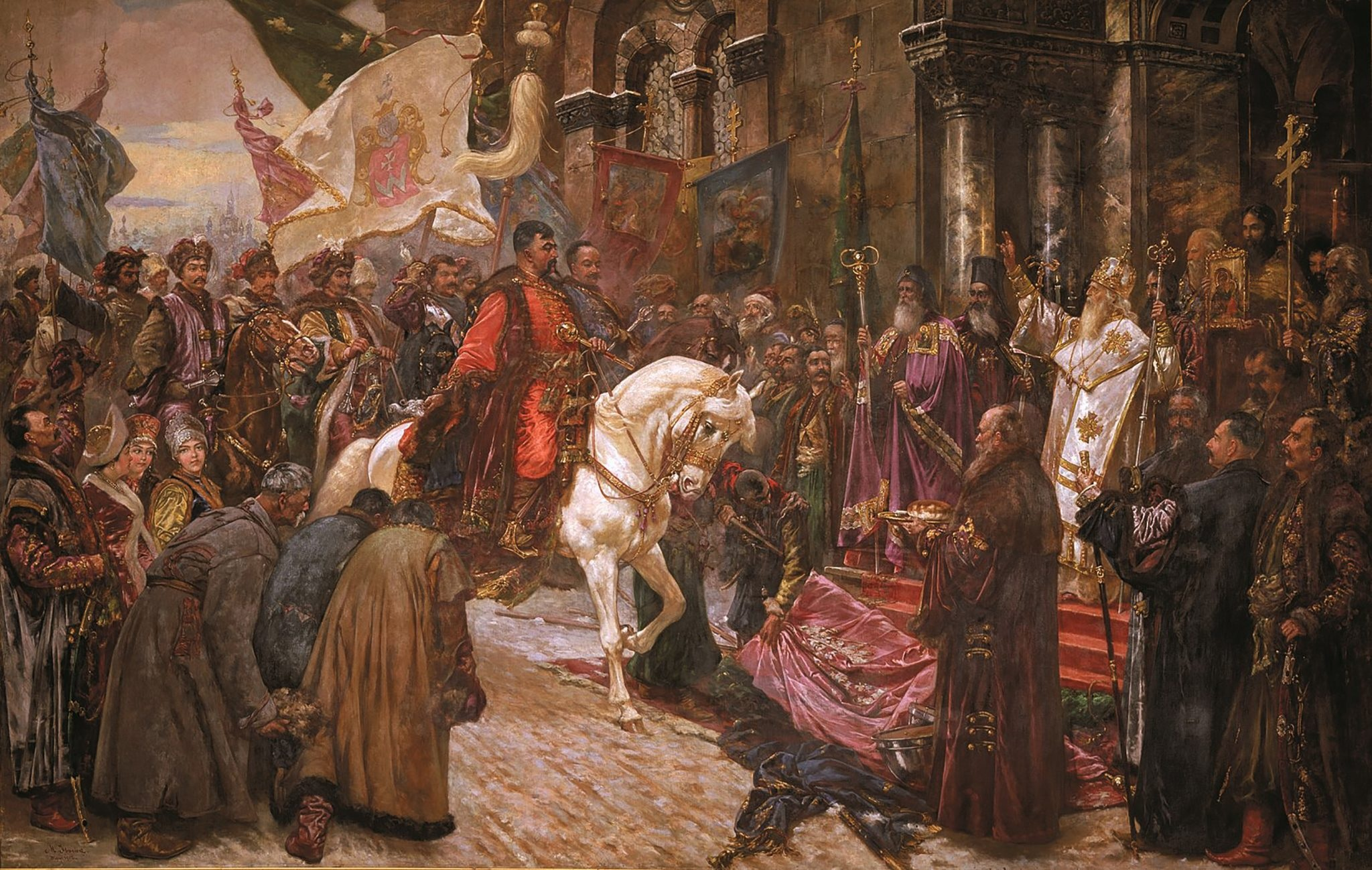
The Entrance of Bogdan Khmelnytsky to Kiev in 1649

The long-lasting Cossack uprising began in 1648 and was led by Bohdan Khmelnytsky. It was a great national and social movement, as the increasingly exploited Rus' peasant masses joined the Cossacks to fight their szlachta oppressors. Polonization, catholicizing, state support for the Uniate Church (especially in western Ukraine) at the expense of the often persecuted Orthodox religion, and denying the Ukrainian people cultural opportunities were some of the factors that contributed greatly to the unrest. In spite of the suppression, during the first half of the 17th century the Rus' elements in the region matured, consolidated and gained strength at all levels of society. Accordingly, a great majority of the Ukrainian nobility from the Kiev and Bratslav Voivodeships and the Ukrainian urban people joined the uprising as well.^{[c]}

The unusually dry summer of 1648 and locust attacks caused destruction of crops and hunger in Ukraine, adding to the region's instability.

As Władysław IV carried out preparations for the Turkish expedition that he had planned, by the time the Sejm halted the undertaking, large numbers of Cossack warriors had been mobilized and put in a state of military readiness. The appearance of an outstanding leader, a scribe in the Zaporizhian Army of Registered Cossacks, Bohdan Khmelnytsky, was another decisive factor. Having suffered a wrong from Daniel Czapliński, a Polish nobleman, and unable to obtain redress through official channels, Khmelnytsky headed for the Zaporizhian Sich, where he agitated among the Cossacks already embittered by the repressions of the 1630s, and now also made restless by the cancellation of the war they were told to expect. Khmelnytsky effectively caused the Cossack force to change sides. He was able to secure support from the Crimean Khanate, taking advantage of the Tatars' (and their Ottoman overlords') interest in disabling the Commonwealth's offensive military capabilities. The Cossack-Tatar alliance, a new factor in the regional civil warfare, turned out to be militarily highly effective.

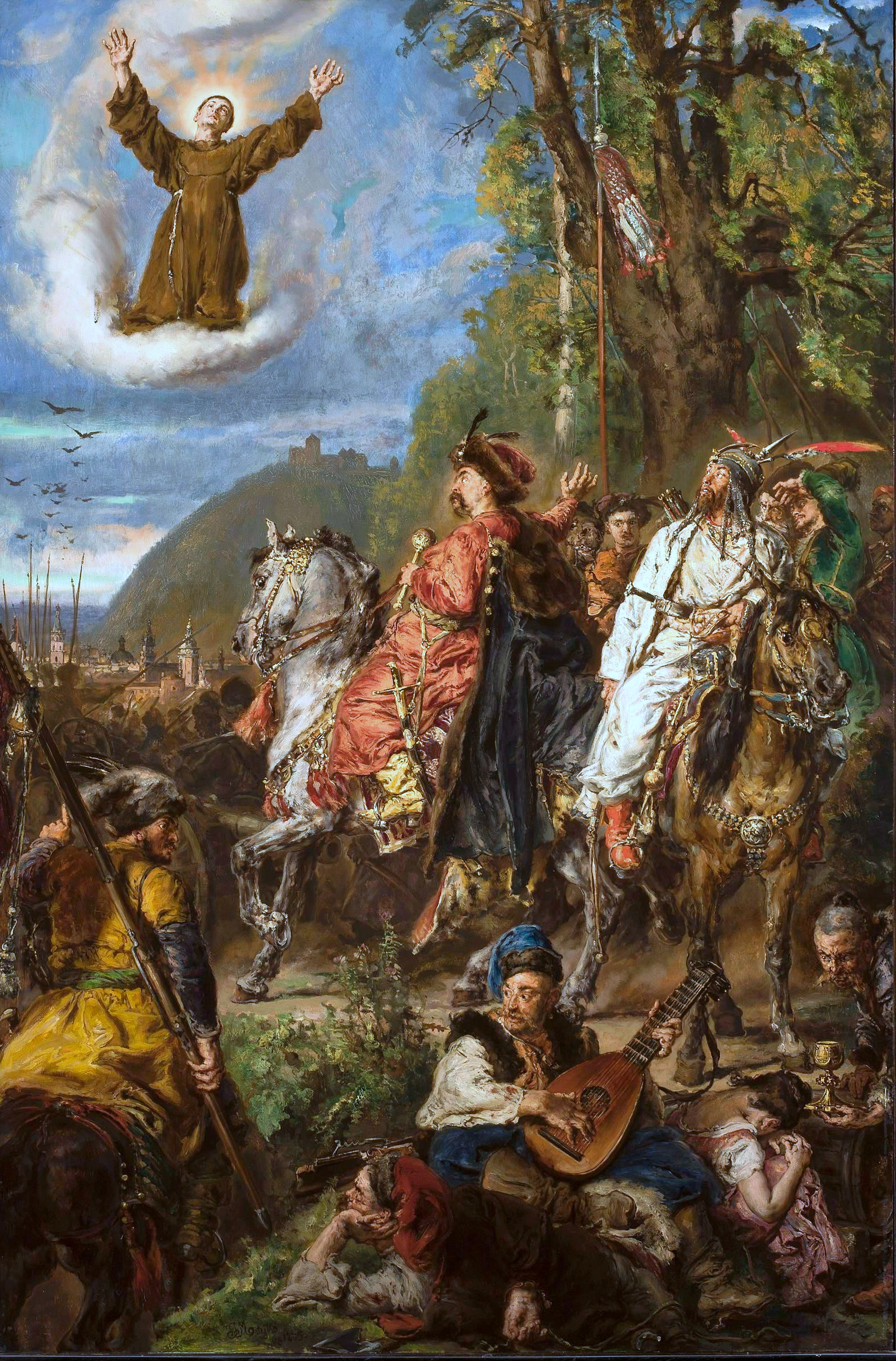
Bohdan Khmelnytsky with Tugay Bey near Lviv

The disastrous consequences of the erroneous and short-sighted, during the reigns of the first two Vasa kings, Cossack policies of the Polish Republic of Nobility were about to make their impact, first of many. In April and May 1648, in the Battle of Zhovti Vody and the Battle of Korsuń the joined Cossack-Tatar forces completely destroyed the Crown army, capturing Crown Hetmans Mikołaj Potocki and Marcin Kalinowski. Thousands of Registered Cossacks, sent into combat with the Polish forces, were persuaded by the rebels to change sides. As a result of the dramatic events, vast expanses of Dnieper Ukraine became engulfed in the spreading social upheaval and the region's separation from the Polish kingdom had begun.

Ukrainian land potentate Jeremi Wiśniowiecki, who embarked on the defense of his huge threatened latifundium and its people, began retreating at the end of May from left-bank Ukraine. Fighting the Cossacks with some measure of success he matched the ruthlessness of the rebels, but brought no resolution to the conflict and prevented a possibility of the considered negotiated solution. Wiśniowiecki commanded his army at the Battle of Starokostiantyniv in late July against Cossack forces led by Maksym Kryvonis; its indecisive outcome allowed Wiśniowiecki and his units to continue their westward movement.

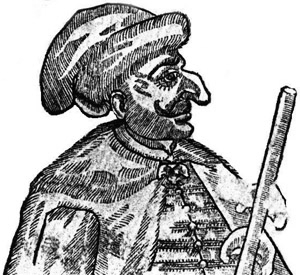
Maksym Kryvonis, a peasant Cossack commander

The death of Władysław IV on May 20 and the discordant interregnum had made the matters worse. Chancellor Jerzy Ossoliński and Voivode Adam Kisiel, a magnate influential with the Ukrainian population, advocated making the concessions necessary to placate the Cossacks. Other magnates, especially Wiśniowiecki, Aleksander Koniecpolski and Janusz Radziwiłł, demanded taking whatever radical punitive steps were required to quench the disorder. The convocation sejm was likewise indecisive and the newly appointed military chiefs incompetent, which resulted in a disastrous defeat at the Battle of Pyliavtsi in September. This allowed Khmelnytsky to move toward Lwów and Zamość, while the uprising expanded into Volhynia and Belarus.

The situation made it possible for the self-styled Cossack Hetman Khmelnytsky to influence the royal election, during which John Casimir Vasa was chosen with his support. John Casimir and the peace nobility faction made offers and engaged in fruitless talks with Khmelnytsky, who had withdrawn into Ukraine. In February 1649 in Pereiaslav the self-confident Hetman, now speaking of total liberation of the "Rus' nation", negotiated with Adam Kisiel, but only a temporary suspension of hostilities was agreed to. Both sides pursued armaments and in spring military activities were resumed.

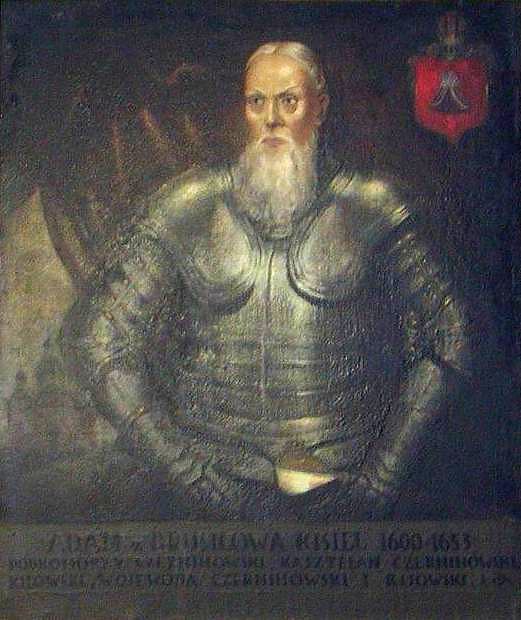
Adam Kisiel, Voivode of Bratslav and the last Eastern Orthodox member of the Commonwealth senate, favored accommodation with the Cossacks

The Polish units protecting Volhynia under Wiśniowiecki were able to defend their fortified encampment at Zbarazh in July and August against the overwhelming Cossack and Tatar armies. Their situation was getting increasingly desperate when the main Crown forces under King John Casimir approached in a rescue attempt. The King was surprised by the enemy at the Battle of Zboriv, but Ossoliński saved the Polish army by successfully negotiating with İslâm III Giray, the Tatar Khan, who was becoming worried about the Cossacks' growing power. Since the Lithuanian forces under Janusz Radziwiłł also entered the Dnieper region, Khmelnytsky consented to ceasing of hostilities on favorable for him, the Cossacks and the Eastern Orthodox Church conditions negotiated in the Treaty of Zboriv (the Cossack Hetmanate was officially recognized by the Commonwealth).

A period of peace lasted from August 1649 to February 1651, but the Polish side balked at the implementation of the Zboriv agreements and further confrontations became inevitable. Khmelnytsky pursued diplomatic activities and obtained a promise of the Ottoman Empire protection and Moldavia's rule for himself upon swearing a fealty oath to the Sultan in 1650. The Cossack Hetman's emissaries also established contacts with Commonwealth dissidents and disaffected peasants in several regions of the Polish Crown and Silesia.

The Kostka-Napierski Uprising erupted in June 1651 in the Podhale region. The peasant rebels, influenced by Khmelnytsky and his uprising, took over the Czorsztyn castle, from where their leader Napierski issued universals calling on the peasants to throw off their lord's yoke. The insurgency generated limited following and was soon suppressed, its leaders executed. There were also a few other centers of peasant revolt, including one organized by Piotr Grzybowski in Greater Poland.

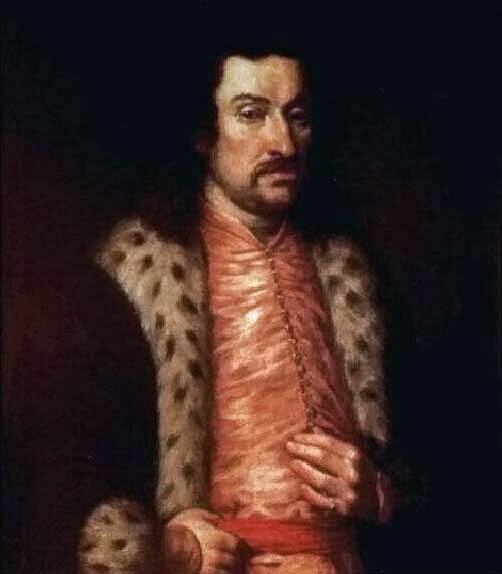
Jeremi Wiśniowiecki, noted for ruthlessness, was a great magnate in the eastern borderlands

In February 1651, Hetman Kalinowski advanced against the Cossacks, but suffered heavy losses and withdrew to Kamieniec Podolski; in May he fought his way to Sokal, where he joined the gathering of the Crown army. In June, both the regular army and szlachta's pospolite ruszenie moved decisively against the Tatar-Cossack forces. At the Battle of Berestechko King John Casimir was able to impose on the enemy the site for the confrontation he chose and in heavy fighting destroy the Cossack army, while the fleeing Tatars took Khmelnytsky with them. However, a majority of the Cossack soldiers were saved by one of their outstanding commanders, Ivan Bohun.

Berestechko, "one of the greatest achievements of the Polish military", removed the threat to the Commonwealth present since 1648, but brought no resolution to the Ukrainian conflict. The szlachta fighters soon left. Khmelnytsky regrouped and with Tatar reinforcements resumed his military harassment. As the combined Crown and Lithuanian armies were not able to follow up the Berestechko victory in the inconclusive Battle of Bila Tserkva, the two sides signed the Treaty of Bila Tserkva, which reduced the Treaty of Zboriv Cossack gains.

With the Sultan's support Hetman Khmelnytsky then attempted to subjugate Moldavia by demanding a marriage of his son Tymofiy to Ruxandra, daughter of Vasile Lupu, the Moldavian ruler connected to the Radziwiłł family. After Vasile's refusal the Hetman sent to Moldavia a strong Cossack-Tatar army. This force was confronted in May 1652 by Hetman Kalinowski and his over ten thousand men Crown army. At the disastrous for the Poles Battle of Batoh most of them, including Kalinowski, were killed.

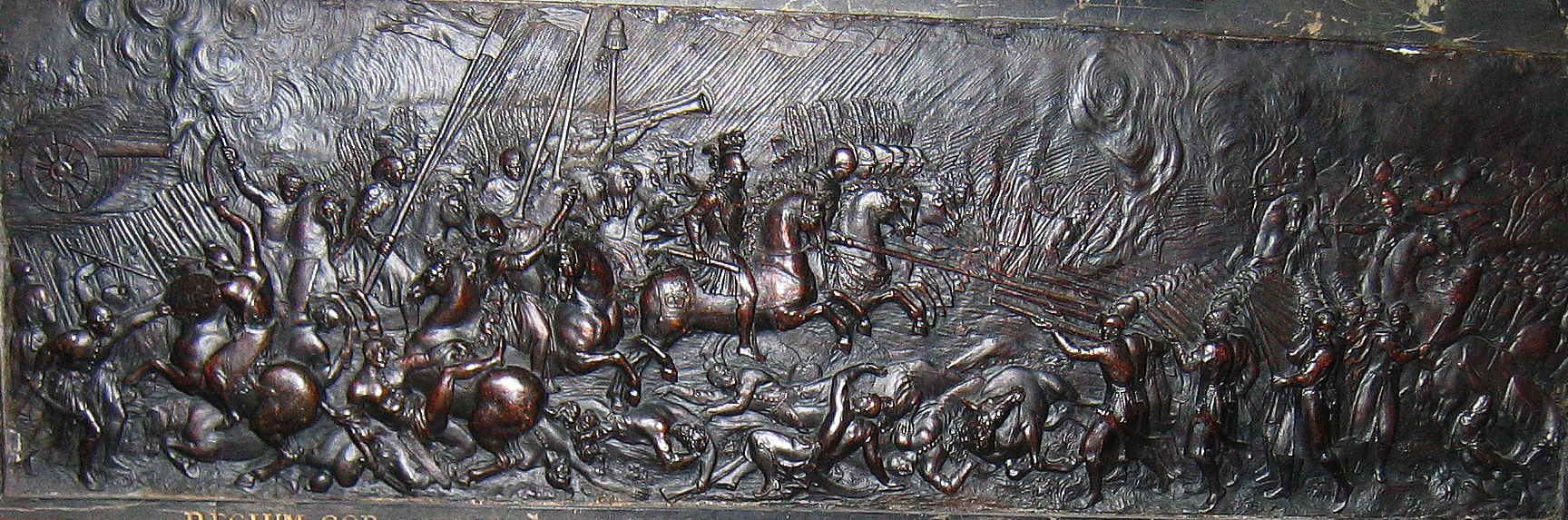
Battle of Berestechko 1651, relief at Saint-Germain-des-Prés (abbey) in Paris

The marriage did take place, but the Moldavian boyars conspired against the Hospodar. Tymofiy, defending his father-in-law, died at the Polish-Transylvanian siege of Suceava. The main Polish forces led by John Casimir became stuck at a camp near Zhvanets. John Casimir negotiated with the Tatar Khan İslâm Giray again and in December 1653 accepted in the Treaty of Zhvanets the old Treaty of Zboriv's conditions.

The Tatars, concerned with the preservation of the regional balance of power, over all may have saved the Commonwealth, by deciding not to support the Cossacks at crucial junctures. While for the moment they reaped the benefits of their position and actions (the King agreed not to resist the next Tatar slave-taking raids into Poland), for the Poles the Berestechko victory was by that time wasted.

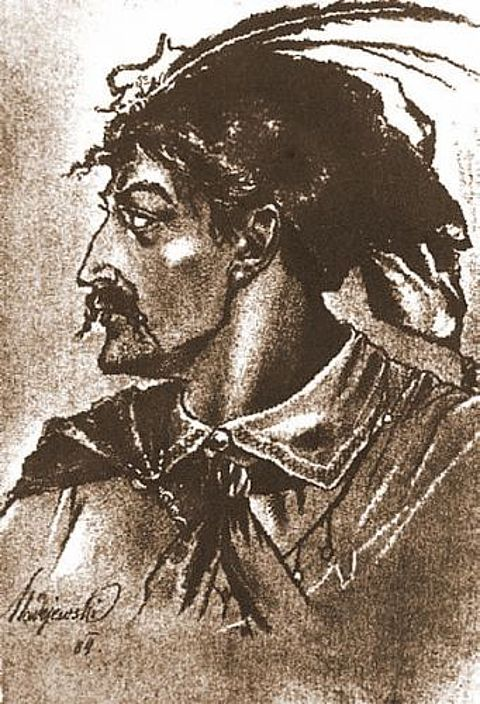
Ivan Bohun

The Commonwealth and Cossack combatants were unable to arrive at a military solution, the Crimean and Ottoman alliances had not been reliable for Bohdan Khmelnytsky, and Ukraine was devastated by five years of warfare. Enslavement of Ukrainians by the Tatar "allies", plagues and periods of hunger complemented the destruction and depopulation reached 40% in some regions of the country. The losses caused damage to the cohesiveness of the Cossack army and led to greater pro-Moscow orientation and dependence on the northeastern neighbor. The Cossack hetman turned to his prior concepts of increasing cooperation with Russia (talks with the Tsardom took place already in 1651, but the deal was not consummated at that time because of the Berestechko defeat), the country of more distant common historic tradition, but close linguistic, religious and East Slavic cultural ties with Ukraine. The Cossack leaders expected on the one hand Russia's help in eliminating what was left of the Commonwealth's nobility rule in Ukraine, and broad autonomy for the Cossack state on the other. The Polish reverses in the region convinced Tsar Alexis to abandon his policy of non-involvement and move against the Commonwealth.

A Russian mission arrived in Pereiaslav in January 1654 and the Cossack council deliberating there accepted (not without grave misgivings and futile attempts to negotiate concessions) the supremacy of the Tsar. The Cossacks were offered an elected hetman post, a sixty thousand registry and possession of landed estates. Khmelnytsky and his entire Zaporizhian army pledged being faithful followers of the Russian ruler and Ukraine was taken under the protection of the Tsardom of Russia. Ukrainians of all ranks gathered, or were compelled to gather in Kiev and other towns to take oath of fealty; part of the secular and Orthodox clergy leaders objected or refused. The actual agreement was finalized in April in Moscow, where the Cossack emissaries managed to convince the Tsardom to accept a majority of the Cossack demands (the degree of Ukrainian autonomy was specified) and obtain the promise of Russian intervention in the Commonwealth.

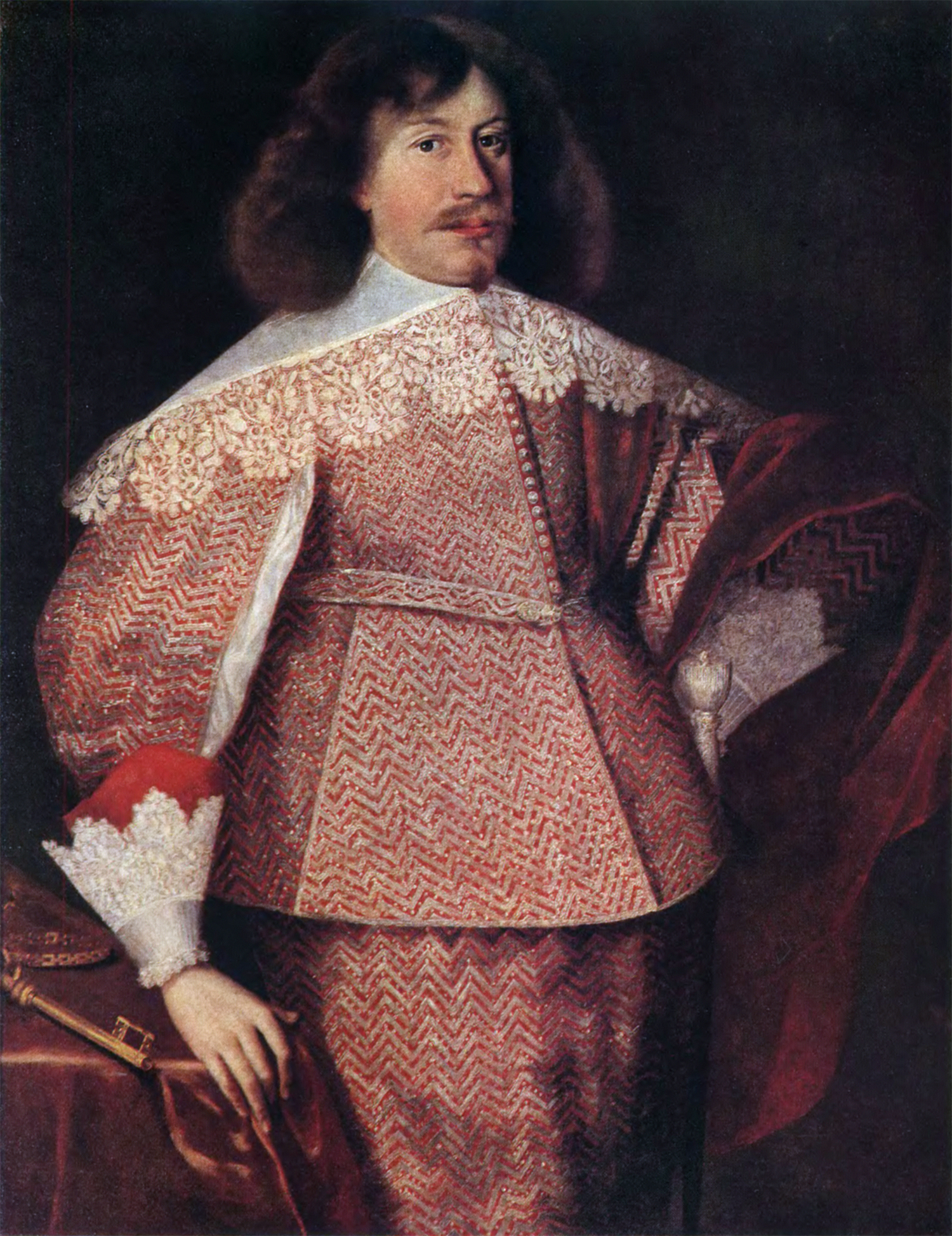
Janusz Radziwiłł by Bartholomeus Strobel

The Cossack hetman and his advisers meant a military alliance to facilitate common fight against Poland, even at the price of losing some of the sovereignty acquired in recent years; to Russia a new avenue for imperial expansion was opened. The Treaty of Pereyaslav, an act of "unification of Ukraine with Russia", was from the Commonwealth's point of view an instance of rebellion combined with foreign meddling. It led to a new Russo-Polish war that lasted from 1654 to 1667. Powerful Russian armies entered the Commonwealth and the conflict with the Cossacks became a war with the Tsardom.

The Russian plans included not only incorporation of Ukraine, but also recovery of the lands lost by Russia further north. The Ottoman Empire and the Crimean Khanate, worried by the new configuration, were now inclined to support the Commonwealth. With the Tatars the Polish units waged a destructive raid into Ukraine and fought in early 1655 the victorious Battle of Okhmativ against combined Russian and Ukrainian forces. Later that year Khmelnytsky counterattacked, took Lublin and reached the Vistula, but was forced to acknowledge John Casimir's supremacy again when his efforts were thwarted by the Tatars. Until his death in 1657 the Cossack leader, despite the Pereyaslav treaty, conducted independent policy, intent on taking advantage of the calamities that had befallen upon the Commonwealth, but also considered an improvement of the relationship with the great power that he shook up ("fatally wounded", according to historian Timothy Snyder).

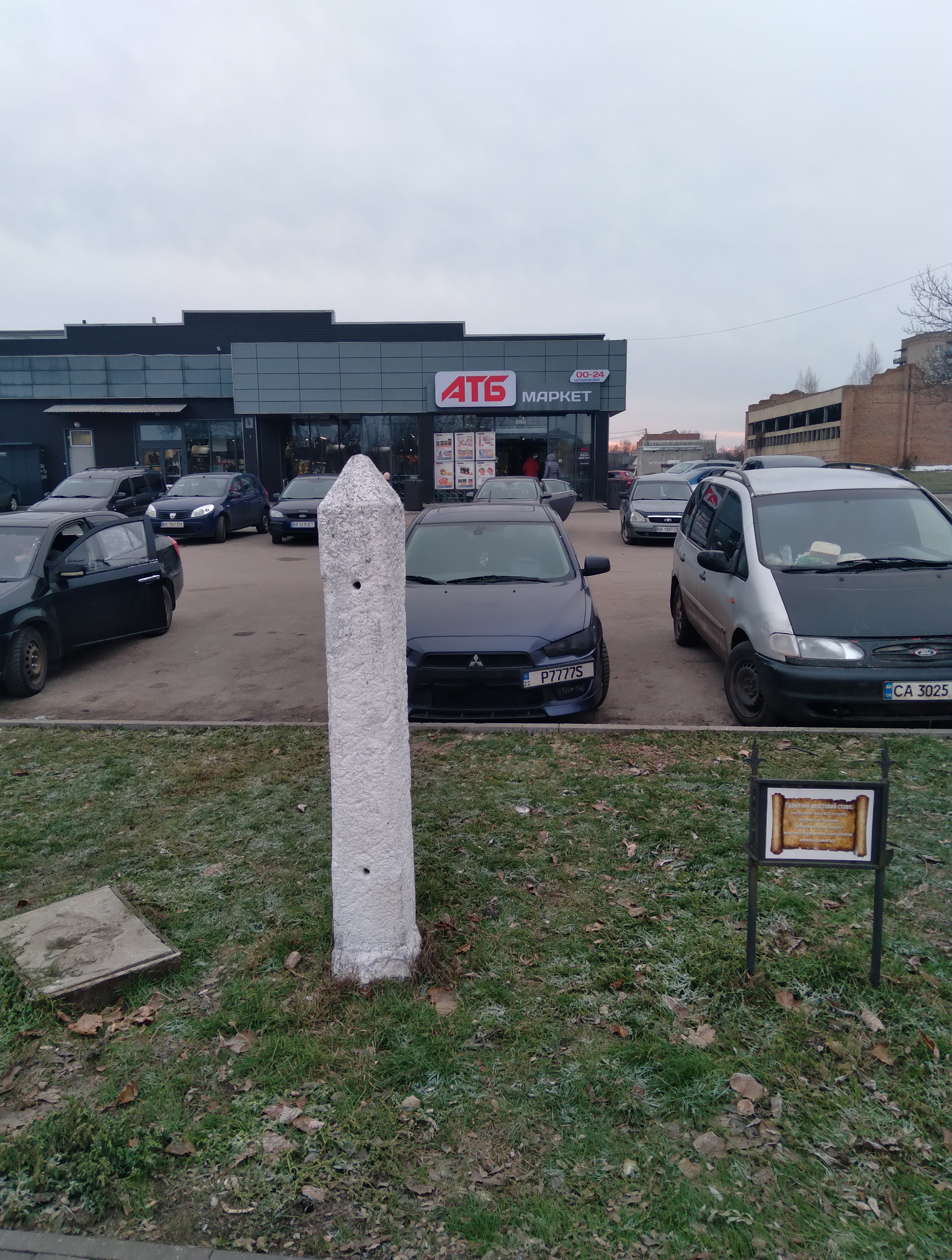
One of the unique granite columns with which Ukrainian Cossacks marked their territory

In the Grand Duchy of Lithuania the first phase of the war with the Tsardom ended with a total defeat of the Commonwealth. At the Battle of Shklow (1654) and the Battle of Shepelevichy the Russians destroyed the small Lithuanian force under Janusz Radziwiłł. The country laid open to the conquerors. Belarusian towns surrendered one after another and in 1654 Smolensk fell after a three-month-long siege. The next year the Russians took Minsk, Grodno (Hrodna) and Vilnius. With the simultaneous Swedish war disasters the Commonwealth had to accede in 1656 to the Truce of Vilnius accord.

The Commonwealth's failure to emancipate the Cossacks led to a shift in the regional balance of power (the Khmelnytsky Uprising marks the turning point) and gave rise to the western expansion of the Russian Empire, which eventually resulted in the loss of the Commonwealth's independent existence.

=== Defense and foreign policy in time of crisis ===
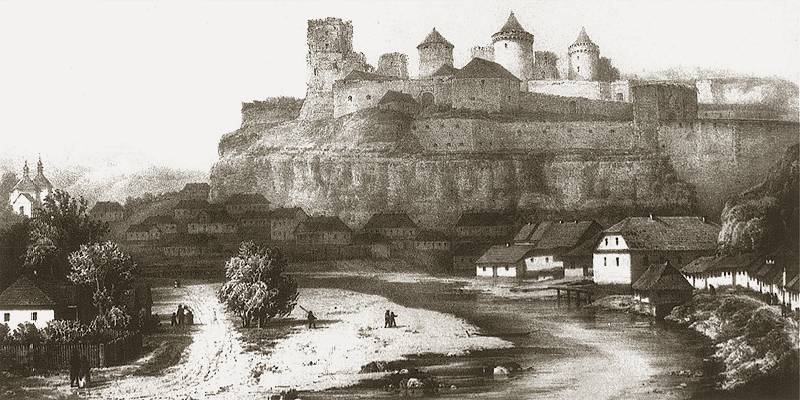
Kamieniec Podolski (Kamianets-Podilskyi) fortress

The Khmelnytsky Uprising was the beginning of a long period of internal crisis in the Polish–Lithuanian Commonwealth. The external situation also deteriorated, because of the increased strength of Sweden, Russia, Prussia and the Ottoman Empire. Being forced to simultaneously fight on the Baltic and Ukrainian fronts, the Commonwealth incurred significant territorial losses, even though for the time being its existence was not realistically threatened. The Commonwealth was regarded by main European states, including the France of Louis XIV, as a regional power and valuable partner, necessary component of the European balance of power. This perception was being reinforced by military victories, especially under the Hetman and then King John III Sobieski.

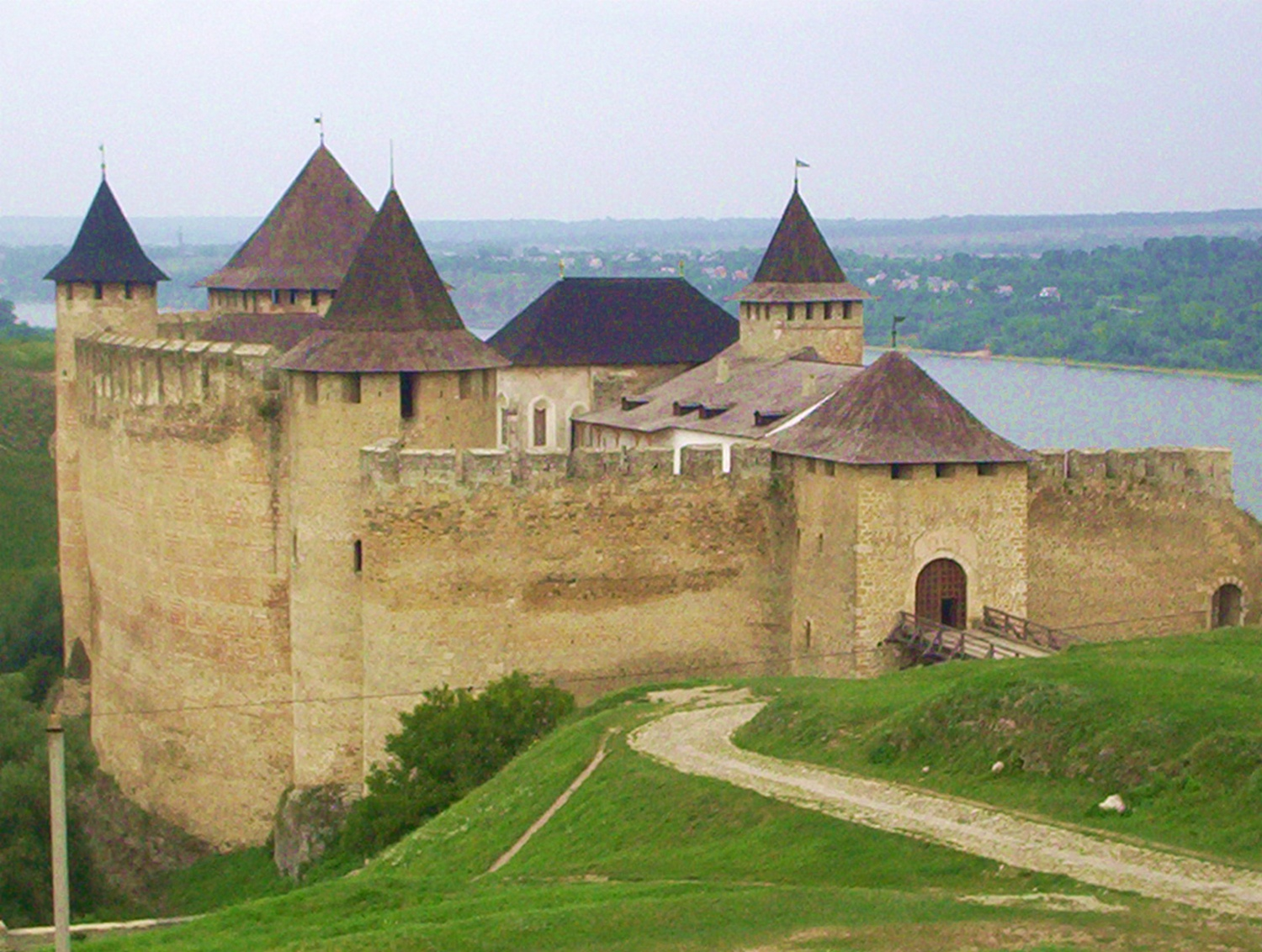
The Khotyn stronghold changed hands on a number of occasions

In the decentralized state and treasury, the military potential was hampered by the inefficient fiscal apparatus and insufficient taxation. The Commonwealth in the second half of the 17th century developed huge indebtedness in respect to its own armed forces. Military confederations or rebellions, through which the army "collected" its own pay typically from royal and church estates, were getting increasingly common. Hetman Sobieski was unable to follow up his Khotyn victory in part because the unpaid Lithuanian and Crown troops left. The Commonwealth was able to field a 60,000 army (plus the unreliable pospolite ruszenie) at the very most, at times when the Habsburg monarchy or the Tsardom of Russia were capable of an effort twice that size. After the Cossack-Tatar wars and to a lesser degree after 1655, the armed forces had to be rebuilt almost completely.

The Commonwealth forces had a much higher (50%) than in other European, infantry-dominated armies, proportion of cavalry, which was of unrivaled in Europe quality. The infantry was also of high battlefield value. Artillery was well-developed and effective, with nearly two thousand pieces present throughout the country. A majority and increasing proportion of soldiers were now of native, rather foreign origin, with decreasing participation of szlachta, who however monopolized the command and dominated the officer corps. The highest ranks belonged to wealthy magnates, with the notable exception of Stefan Czarniecki, a nobleman of more humble origins. Czarniecki introduced guerrilla warfare with heavy participation of peasant masses. Afterwards the last great Polish battlefield successes were made possible by the universal military talent of Jan Sobieski.

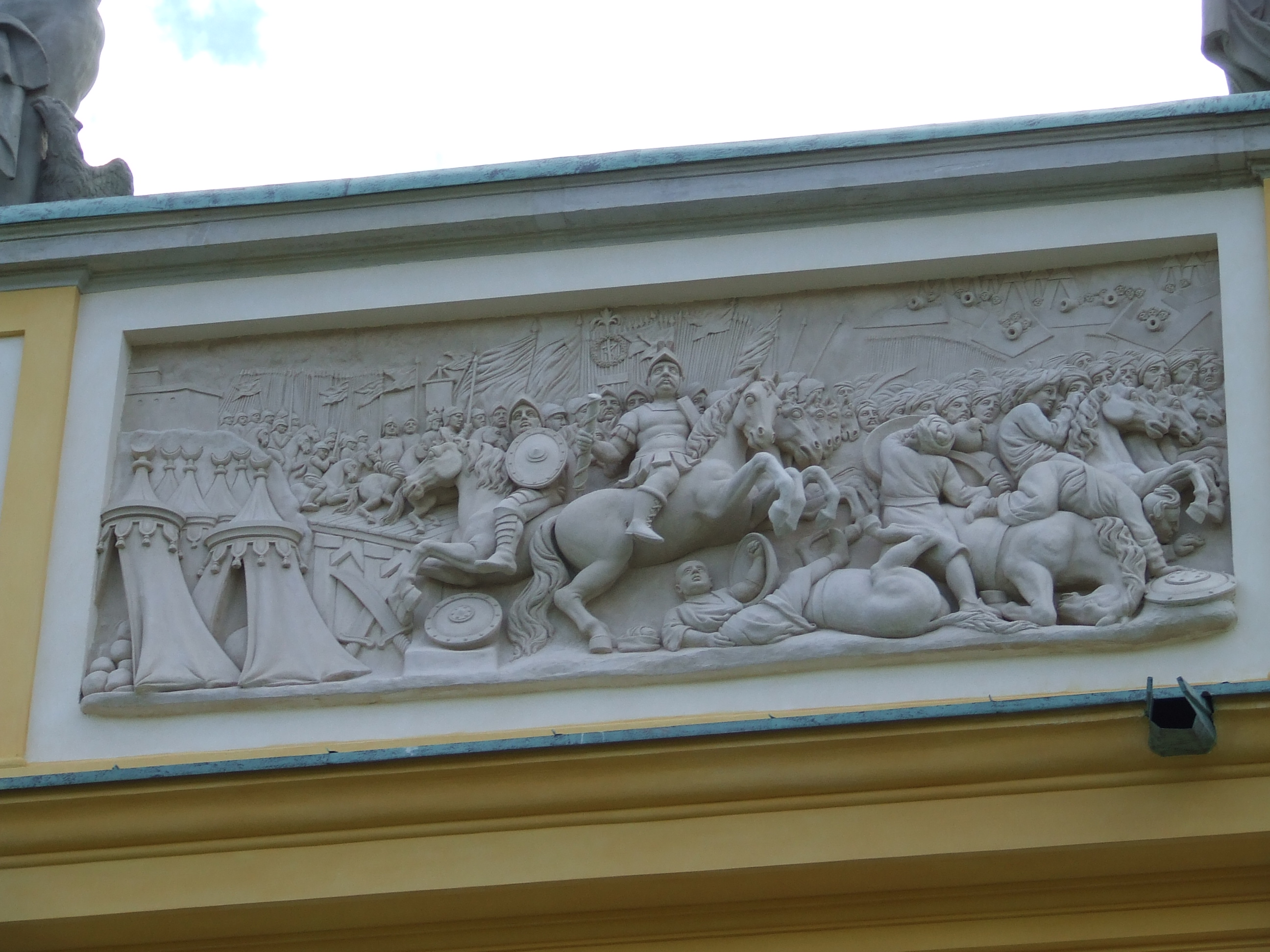
Hetman Jan Sobieski at the Battle of Khotyn (1673)

The one major weakness and backwardness of the Commonwealth defenses was the lack of significant system of modern fortifications throughout most of its territory, which allowed the invading armies to inflict damage disproportionate to military effort. The exceptions were the mouth of the Vistula region and the south-east, where there were powerful, even if neglected fortresses, such as the Kamieniec Podolski (Kamianets-Podilskyi) Castle.

The fiscal difficulties affected also the Commonwealth diplomacy and foreign policy. John III kept resident diplomats in several major capitals, but the Sejm imposed limits on what they could undertake. The Sejm also banned long-term resident foreign representations in Warsaw, a prohibition ignored by the papacy and numerous governments. The Sejm itself had rather frequently sent its own missions abroad. The magnates, including top state officials, especially the hetmans, conducted their own foreign activities and at times served foreign powers for their private gain. When French dominated European diplomacy, in Poland the official language was still Latin. The 1684 treaty of Holy League, which ignored the recent Polish military contributions and Polish interests alike, was just one example of the Commonwealth's diplomacy lack of effectiveness.

=== Swedish invasion, empowerment of East Prussia ===
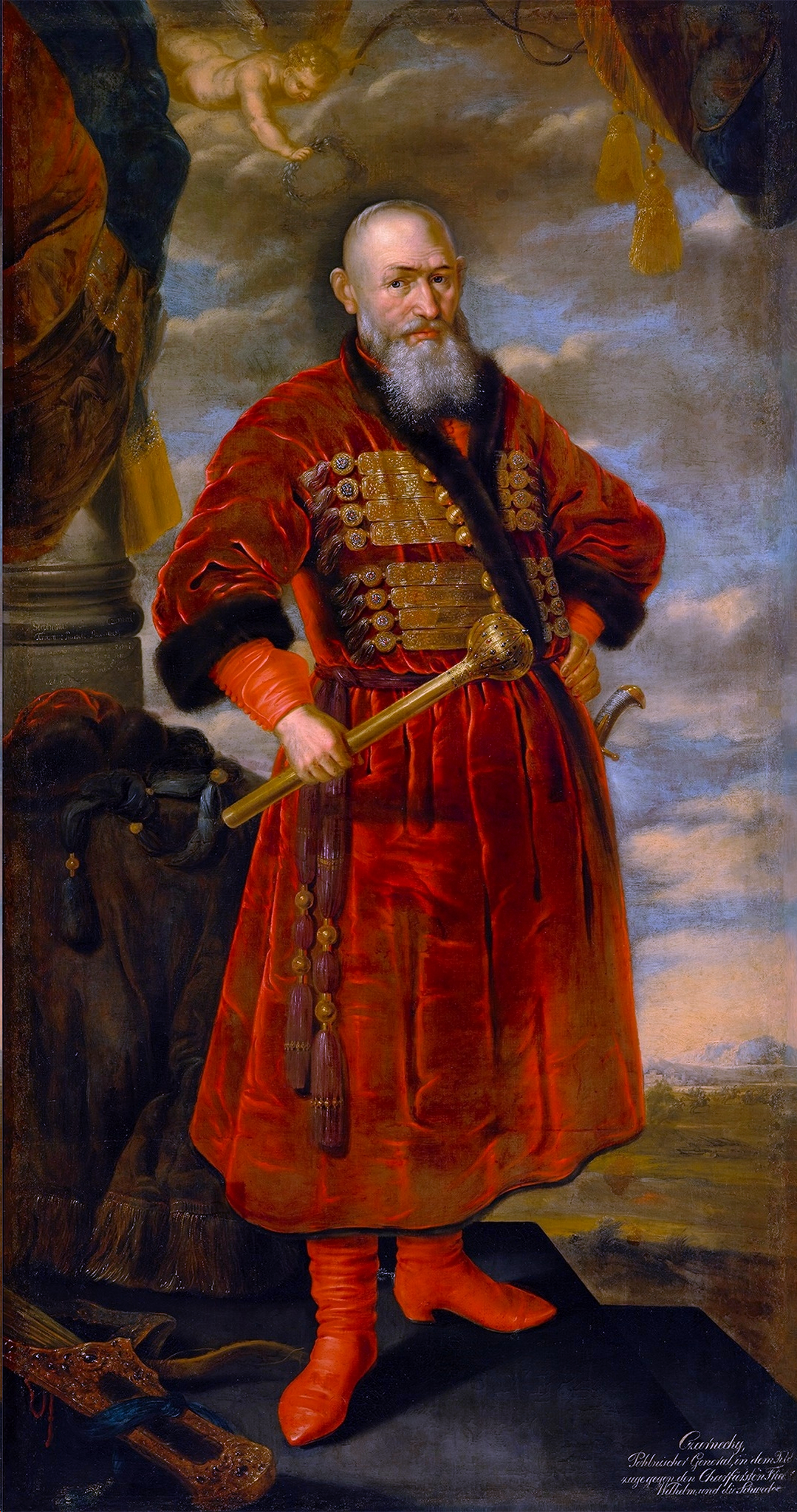
Stefan Czarniecki

The Swedish invasion of the Commonwealth, known as the Deluge, took place within the context of the Second Northern War. In 1655 the Commonwealth's survival had become endangered, when the huge federation, already critically weakened by the offensive of the Russians, who occupied most of the Grand Duchy of Lithuania, and by Khmelnytsky's Cossacks holding fast to the lands they overran in Ukraine, was subjected to a massive attack by Sweden. The Swedish leaders, emboldened by the Peace of Westphalia gains, including the western Duchy of Pomerania, intended precisely to take advantage of Poland's grave difficulties, hoping to easily take over at least Courland and Prussia, and thus to enforce their total domination over the Baltic Sea area.

Worried about the Russian strength and advances in the East Baltic region and toward Livonia, the Swedes blocked their further progress by taking over Dünaburg (Daugavpils). King Charles X Gustav of Sweden was also encouraged by the Polish magnate opposition unhappy with John Casimir's rule; Hieronim Radziejowski, expelled form the Commonwealth by the sejm court, was the magnates' representative in Stockholm. The Commonwealth nobility hoped that acquiring the Swedish monarch's protection, or even accepting his rule, would help them recover the eastern lands lost in the warfare of the past several years.

The Swedish armies entered the Commonwealth from the Pomeranian and Livonian dominions, the Pomeranian force crossing the border under Arvid Wittenberg on July 25. At the Battle of Ujście, Greater Poland's pospolite ruszenie briefly fought, but soon capitulated and sought Charles Gustav's protection for their province. Magnus De la Gardie's army crossed into Lithuania with promises of help in resisting the Russians. Janusz and Bogusław Radziwiłł there accepted the Swedish king's supremacy and on October 20 signed the Union of Kėdainiai treaty, under which Lithuania was to form a union with Sweden, instead of Poland.

Other provinces of the Polish Crown by that time had also surrendered to the King of Sweden. Warsaw did not resist the invaders and was thoroughly plundered. John Casimir fought, but was defeated at the Battle of Żarnów and sought refuge, first in Żywiec district and then in Oberglogau in the Duchy of Oppeln (Opole) in Silesia, outside of the Crown. Kraków was defended with determination for three weeks under Stefan Czarniecki's command, but had to capitulate when a rescue force was crushed by the Swedes in the Battle of Wojnicz. The bulk of the Polish nobility and the armed forces declared loyalty to Charles Gustav.

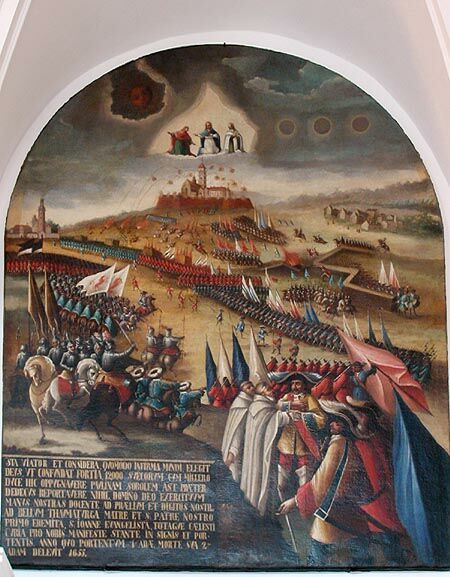
Jasna Góra Monastery under siege

The Swedes failed to take advantage of the local support and treated the Commonwealth as a conquered country, subjecting it to widespread violence, predatory contributions, ruthlessness and pillage. Spontaneous popular resistance arose first among the peasants, beginning with a skirmish they fought near Myślenice. Partisan groups included also townspeople and szlachta, who disillusioned with Charles Gustav often switched sides and took the lead of the fighting. Krzysztof Żegocki led the uprising in Greater Poland. Carpathian foothills region units were highly successful, liberating Nowy Sącz and many other towns. Lwów (Lviv) and Zamość resisted both the Cossack and the Swedish assaults, similarly Danzig (Gdańsk) and Marienburg in case of the Swedes. Some of the Lithuanian forces, under Paweł Jan Sapieha, had remained faithful to John Casimir. They fought in Podlaskie against the Radziwiłłs and took Tykocin. John Casimir himself still in Silesia, issued a universal calling for national resistance against the Swedes, and then on December 18 embarked on a return trip to Poland. The Commonwealth's remaining ally, Crimean Khan Mehmed IV Giray, who had just defeated Khmelnytsky, was offering help and support.

The Jasna Góra Monastery of the Pauline Fathers in Częstochowa was under siege for several weeks at the end of 1655. The success of the monastery's defense was of great psychological and spiritual importance for the Poles. The defense efforts at Jasna Góra, a great shrine and fortress with a crew of a few hundred volunteers, were led by Prior Augustyn Kordecki. Before the end of the year, as peasant rescue units approached the site, the Swedish forces were compelled to abandon the siege. The Poles at this stage of the war were becoming increasingly effective militarily. They used the attack against the national shrine as a rallying point; it added a religious dimension and zeal (defense of Catholicism and anti-Protestant) to their struggle.

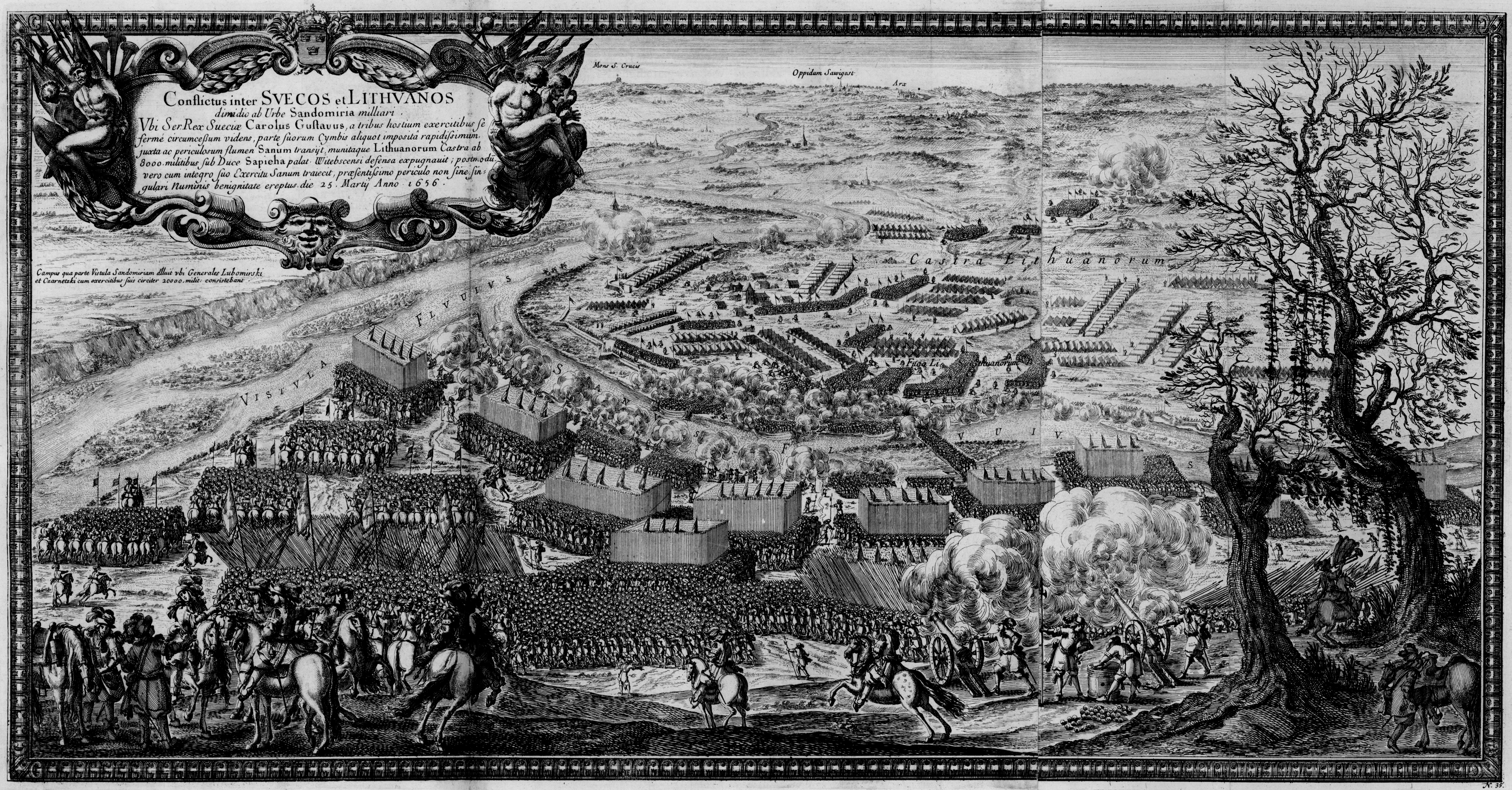
Battle near the confluence of the Vistula and San rivers

On December 29 the Crown hetmans withdrew their previous support of Charles Gustav and established the Tyszowce military confederation aimed at opposing the Swedish invaders. In January 1656 John Casimir returned from abroad and, impressed by the contributions to the war effort made by Poland's common people, solemnly declared in Lwów his support for relieving the peasantry of unjust obligations.

Charles Gustav concentrated on completing the takeover of Prussia. Thorn (Toruń) surrendered without a fight, Marienburg after resisting the siege. Danzig, supported by the Netherlands, remained unconquered. The Swedish king was able to obtain concessions from Frederick William I, the Elector of Brandenburg and Duke of Prussia and vassal of the Commonwealth (in regard to his Prussian rule), who in exchange for Warmia region agreed in Königsberg to become a vassal of Sweden. Charles Gustav then moved south, with the intention of breaking the Polish military opposition.

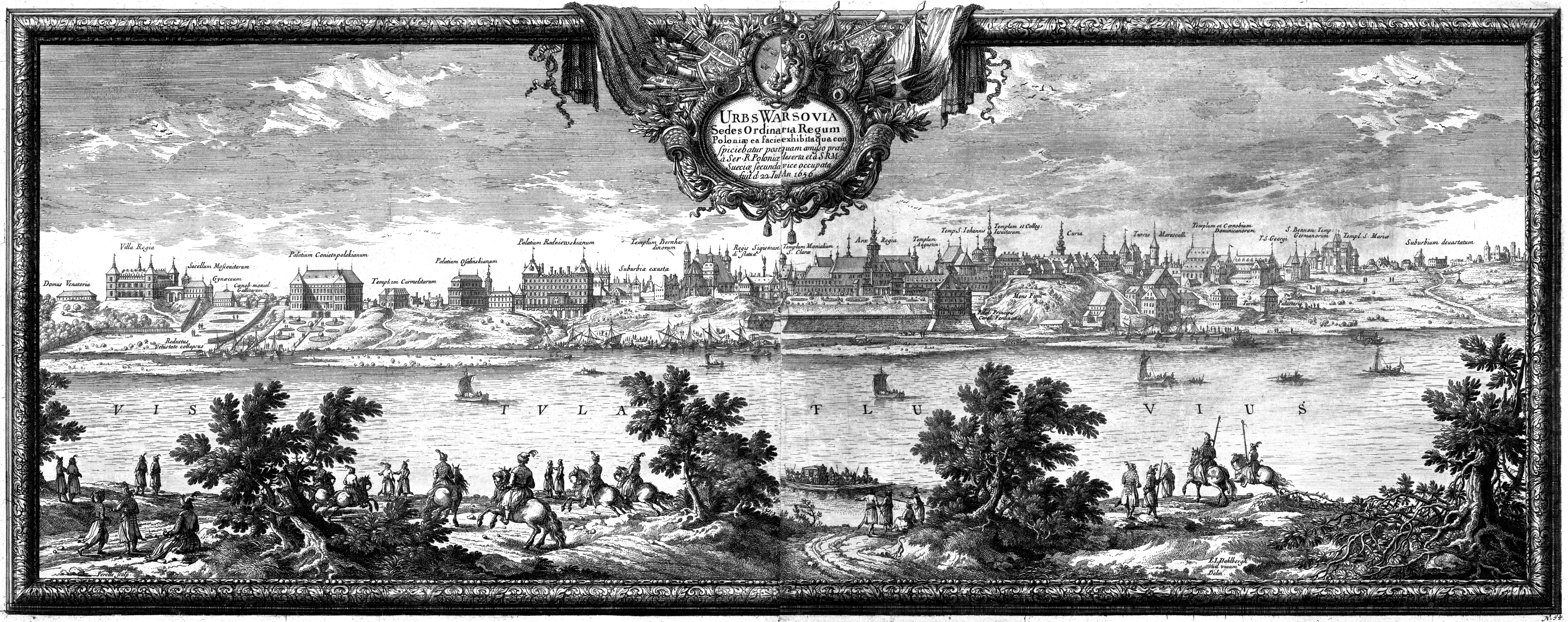
Warsaw in 1656

The Poles were still at a disadvantage facing the Swedish army in the open field, and Czarniecki's forces were defeated at the Battle of Gołąb in February 1656. Afterwards the Polish commander successfully applied guerrilla fighting tactics, harassing the enemy while avoiding engagements with the main army. Charles Gustav was soon forced to abandon the siege of Zamość and the planned attack on Lwów. His attempt to hold off the enemy along the line of the San River was unsuccessful, as his forces were trapped by Czarniecki, Jerzy Lubomirski and Sapieha at the fork formed by the San with the Vistula. When Czarniecki left the site to face and crush at Warka the approaching Swedish rescue force under Margrave Friedrich of Baden, Charles Gustav was able to escape the predicament, but the massive Polish uprising by then seized the initiative and broke the Swedish defenses. Most of Lesser Poland was liberated, except for Kraków, and Greater Poland was also cleared of the Swedes following Czarniecki's and Lubomirski's raid there. At the end of June Warsaw, defended by Wittenberg, was stormed and retaken by the popular forces.

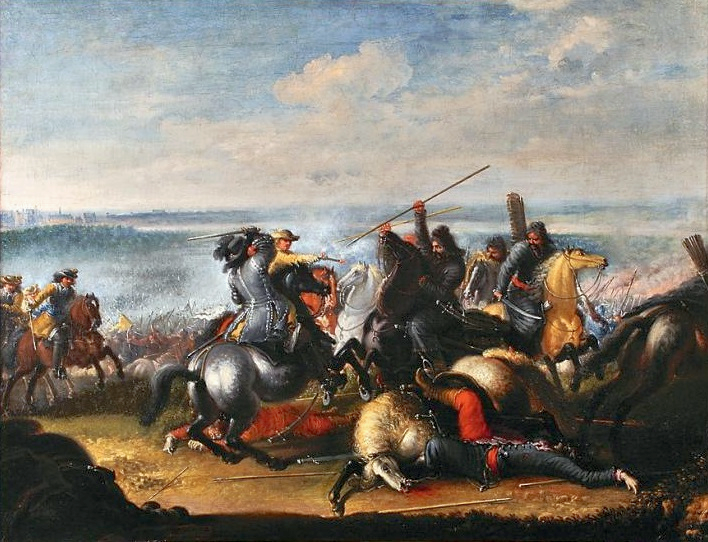
Charles X Gustav fighting the Tatar allies of Poland. The Crimean Khanate forces were used by the Ottoman Empire, interested in preserving a balance of power in the north, against the Commonwealth during the Ukrainian and in support of it during the Swedish wars.

Seeking help the Swedish king made Frederick William an offer of Greater Poland. The combined armies of the two monarchs approached Warsaw and fought at the end of July a three-day heavy battle against Polish and Lithuanian troops aided by the Tatars, won by the Swedish-Brandenburg coalition. Frederick William however soon had to retreat after his duchy was attacked by Polish and Tatar forces. Hetman Gosiewski managed to defeat the combined enemy at the Battle of Prostki, while Czarniecki conducted further clearing activities in Greater Poland followed by a revenge incursion into the Brandenburg March and Farther Pomerania.

The international balance of power was also shifting in favor of the Commonwealth because of the agreement with Russia in fall of 1656, motivated in part by the Tsardom's strategic interest in preventing a collapse of the Polish–Lithuanian state and uncontrolled expansion of Sweden. Not giving up its own claims and gains in the east, Russia moved against the Swedish forces in Livonia, which also facilitated their removal from Lithuania. This new situation forced Charles Gustav to alter his plans of conquering all of Poland and to propose a territorial partitioning scheme, under which the Polish–Lithuanian Commonwealth was to be eliminated altogether and he would be able to keep at least some of Sweden's prospects.

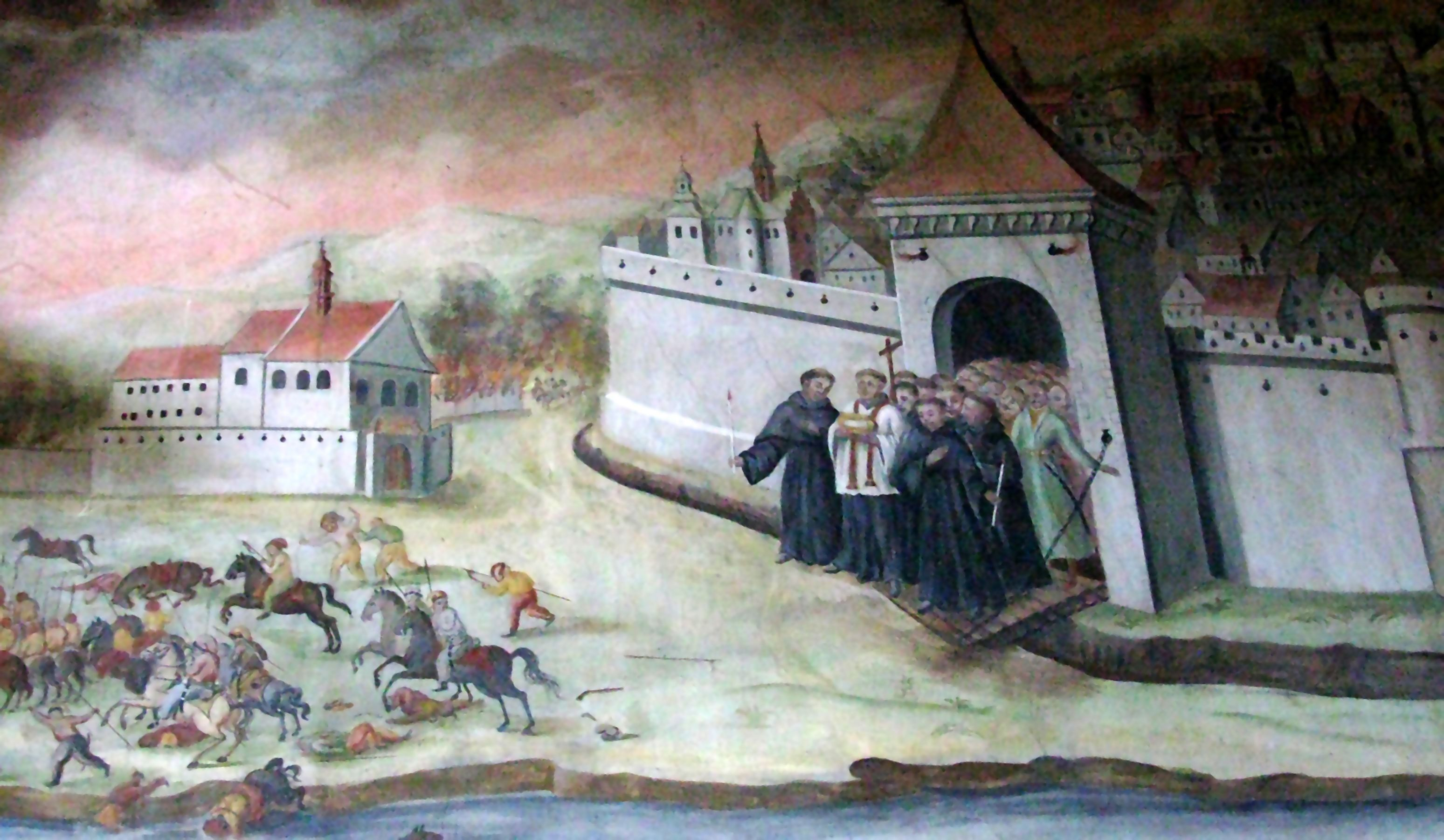
Przemyśl defended against the forces of George II Rákóczi

First in the Treaty of Labiau the Swedish king granted sovereign rights in Prussia and possession of Greater Poland to Frederick William. In December 1656 a partition treaty involving several monarchs and other parties was concluded in Radnot in Transylvania.

One of the treaty signatories was George II Rákóczi, Prince of Transylvania, whose forces entered the Commonwealth in early 1657 on a pillaging spree, reaching in cooperation with the Swedes as far north as Warsaw and Brest. Rákóczi's initially successful offensive had in the end favorable for Poland consequences, as it led to a new configuration of international interests, which prevented the Treaty of Radnot from being implemented.

The so-far rather indifferent Austrian Commonwealth's ally became worried about a stronger Transylvania threatening its Hungarian possessions, which led to an auxiliary military agreement negotiated with the Commonwealth representatives in Vienna, and an Austrian diplomatic initiative aimed at separating Brandenburg form Sweden. Lubomirski's forces raided Transylvania and retreating Rákóczi was defeated by the Poles and Tatars at Czarny Ostrów in Podolia. The combined Polish and Austrian forces had retaken Kraków. Denmark joined the war against Sweden and became the Commonwealth's ally.

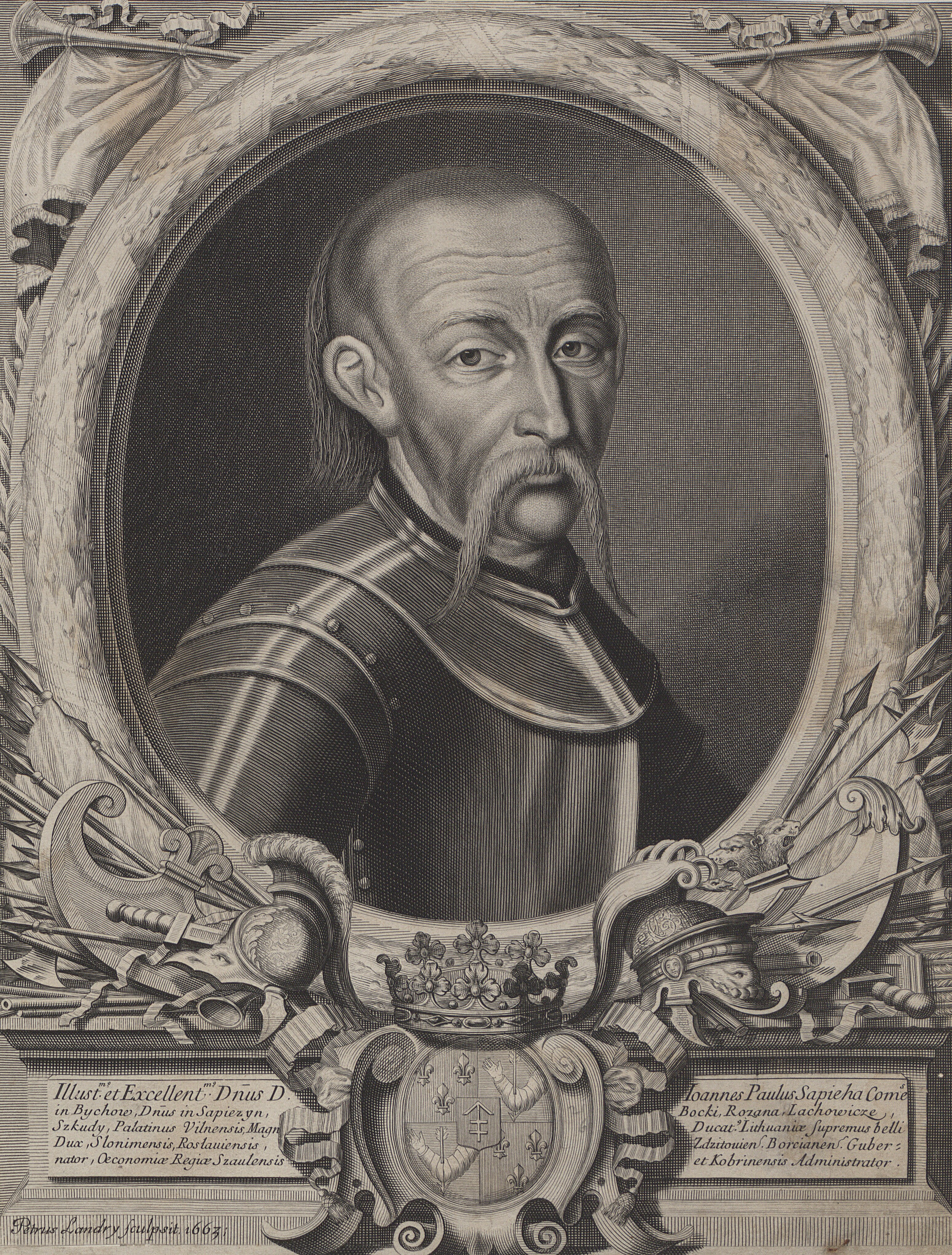
Paweł Jan Sapieha

Austrian intermediaries facilitated the decisively important negotiations between Frederick William of Brandenburg-Prussia and the Commonwealth, which in fall of 1657 resulted in the Treaties of Wehlau-Bromberg. The treaties considerably strengthened the Prussian side, as Frederick William, in return for agreeing to abandon Charles Gustav, became a sovereign ruler in Ducal Prussia, ending the historic dependency of East Prussia upon the Commonwealth. The Prussian ruler was also a recipient of other, including territorial (Lębork and Bytów fiefs, Draheim Starostwo), privileges. The Prussian estates ended up with a homage obligation when a new duke is inaugurated, and an eternal alliance required a Prussian ruler to provide modest assistance to the Commonwealth in case of war.

Efforts to remove Swedish garrisons from the cities of Royal Prussia and Livonia continued. In 1658 Thorn (Toruń) capitulated after a long siege, but the Swedes kept Marienburg and Elbing (Elbląg) until the end of the war. Charles Gustav moved his main military operation to Denmark. In 1658 a joint Polish-Brandenburg-Austrian expedition into Swedish Pomerania and then Denmark took place. Polish units under Stefan Czarniecki distinguished themselves during the takeover of Alsen Island and the Kolding fortress, and in 1659 in the Battle of Nyborg, where the Swedes suffered a heavy defeat.

France worried about Sweden being removed from the Holy Roman Empire pressed for peace negotiations, which commenced in Oliva near Danzig in the early 1660. The Treaty of Oliva was signed in May, after Charles Gustav's death. The Polish side needed now to preserve strength for the struggle with Russia and the old demarcation line was mostly agreed to, with the Commonwealth keeping Courland and southeastern Livonia, including Daugavpils. The Protestants in Royal Prussia were guaranteed religious freedoms, Frederick William had to return his conquests in Swedish Pomerania to Sweden. John II Casimir relinquished his claims to the Swedish throne. The Treaty of Oliva involved the Commonwealth, Brandenburg and Sweden and was guaranteed by Louis XIV of France.

Frederick William's sovereign takeover met with resistance in the Duchy of Prussia. A nobility faction under Christian Ludwig von Kalckstein and Königsberg burghers led by Hieronymus Roth prepared an armed insurrection. The opposition formed a league in 1662 and appealed to the Commonwealth for assistance. The Commonwealth, preoccupied with the war with Russia and internal unrest in the military, extended no help. Frederick William's forces entered Königsberg and imprisoned the leaders of the rebellion. Von Kalckstein fled to Poland, but in 1670 was captured by a Prussian ruler's representative, taken to the Duchy and executed.

The Deluge's long term deleterious effects included an increase in xenophobic attitudes and intolerance in Poland. The religious minorities, accused of supporting foreign adversaries, were persecuted and pressured to emigrate, in the case of the Polish Brethren forced to leave the country. The international standing of the Commonwealth power had become much diminished, especially (with the loss of control over a major part of Livonia and Eastern Prussia) in the crucially important Baltic Sea region.

=== Treaty of Hadiach, war with Russia, Truce of Andrusovo and division of Ukraine ===
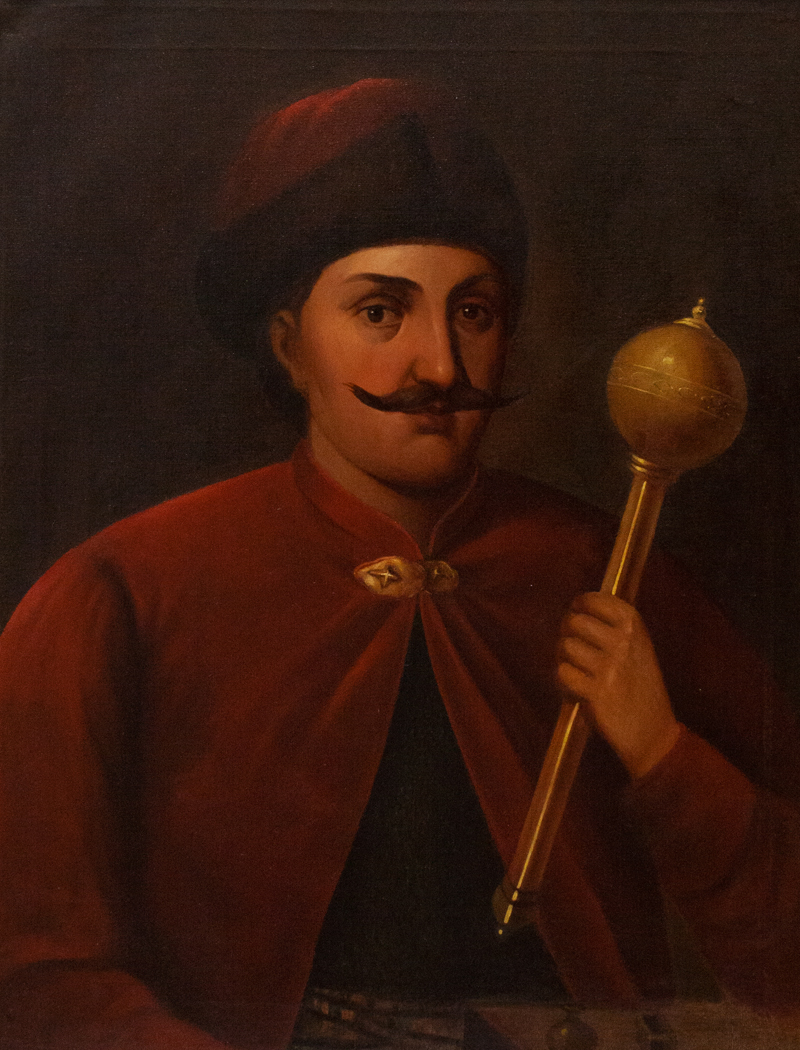
Ivan Vyhovsky

The Polish–Lithuanian magnates were preoccupied with the issue of recovery of their old feudal lands in the east, lost to the Cossacks and Russia. There was one more and the most significant, even if belated and in the end botched, attempt to resolve the Cossack conflict in an amicable way, by including Ukraine as a partner in the Commonwealth federation.

After Bohdan Khmelnytsky's death Ivan Vyhovsky was chosen as the Cossack Hetman. Vyhovsky represented the Cossack upper strata and sought independence from Russia through an alliance with Charles X Gustav and then the Commonwealth, where some of the leaders understood and wanted to amend the erroneousness of the past policies. An appropriate treaty was prepared by Yuri Nemyrych, an Arian and the Chamberlain of Kiev, who represented Vyhovski, and on John Casimir's side Stanisław Kazimierz Bieniewski, Voivode of Chernihiv, among others. The Treaty of Hadiach was signed on September 16, 1658.

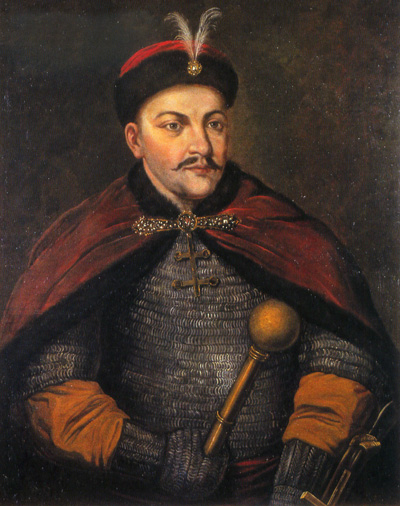
Yurii Khmelnytsky

The provisions of the treaty, and of the proposed union, included the creation of the Duchy of Ruthenia, which, like the Grand Duchy of Lithuania, would have its own state offices and participate in the Commonwealth's Sejm. The Eastern Orthodox Church was to be given equal rights with the Catholic Church, with Orthodox bishops seated in the Senate. Nobility status was to be granted to many better off Cossacks ("...so measured, however, that out of each regiment one hundred can be granted nobility"). But the Cossack register was limited to thirty thousand and with the allowed return of the Polish szlachta to their prewar possessions, many of the ordinary Cossack rebels would have been reduced to feudal peasantry status again. The treaty was reluctantly ratified by the Sejm in May 1659, however with the Cossack negotiated gains substantially reduced, which contributed to the pact's eventual demise, a rejection by the increasingly Moscow-influenced Cossack assembly in September. For the Cossack rank and file, what Vyhovsky had negotiated offered too little and came too late. The crucial factor that doomed the Hadiach treaty was that the sizable regular Ruthenian nobility (not magnates), which would constitute the principal Ukrainian elite with a strong interest in the establishment of the Duchy of Ruthenia, was after ten years of warfare physically eliminated almost in its entirety.

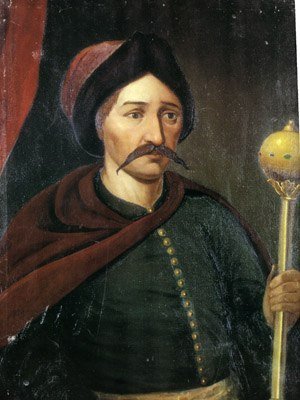
Pavlo Teteria

The Treaty of Hadiach became also a major factor leading to the Commonwealth's renewed warfare with the Tsardom, which considered the accord a violation of the previously agreed truce. The approaching Russian army was defeated at Konotop in July 1659 by Vyhovsky with Polish and Tatar help. During disturbances among the Cossack masses that followed, Jerzy Niemirycz was killed. But Moscow's pressure continued and in the fall Ivan Vyhovsky was forced to give up his hetmanship and was replaced by Yurii Khmelnytsky, Bohdan's son. Khmelnytsky, in an attempt to preserve the unity of Ukraine (the left-bank Cossack regiments had already joined the Russian side), concluded a new Pereyaslav agreement with Russia on October 27. The articles substantially reduced the Ukrainian autonomy and the hetman's authority. The Kiev patriarch became a subordinate of the patriarch of Moscow. Russia's progressive incorporation of all of Ukraine was however prevented by the military developments that followed.

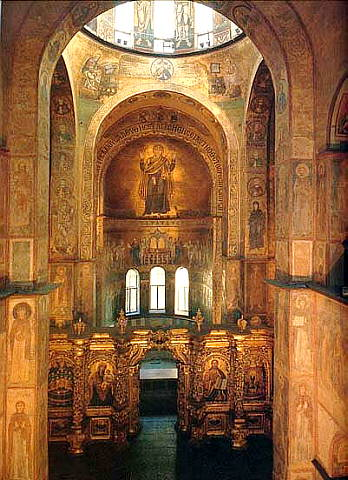
Orthodox Saint Sophia Cathedral in Kiev

Russian armies advanced in 1660. The Commonwealth mustered all its military resources and in Lithuania Stefan Czarniecki and Paweł Jan Sapieha defeated Ivan Khovansky at the Battle of Polonka. The Russians had to abandon the siege of Lachowicze (Lyakhavichy) and withdraw beyond the Berezina River. Vilnius was recovered by the Poles the following year. Of great importance was the Volhynia victory of Jerzy Lubomirski and Stanisław Potocki over Vasily Sheremetev in the Battle of Chudniv in October 1660. Yurii Khmelnytsky, also defeated, agreed there to submit to John Casimir and approved a weaker (for the Cossacks) version of the Treaty of Hadiach.

The Commonwealth's defense and the retaking of the greater portion of the Grand Duchy of Lithuania, however successful, had not resulted in the recovery of all the lands lost in the 1650s. Smolensk was left in Russian hands and Ukraine became divided, with the right (western) bank of the Dnieper River (under Yurii Khmelnytsky) tied to the Commonwealth, and the left bank to Russia under the terms of the Pereyaslav treaties. With the Zaporizhian center also conducting its own politics, the whole division of Ukraine resulted in a highly volatile situation and internal warfare, known in Ukrainian history as the Ruin. In January 1663 in Chyhyryn the pro-Polish Pavlo Teteria was elected Cossack hetman, but his authority was not recognized in left-bank Ukraine, where in June Ivan Briukhovetsky was chosen with Russian support.

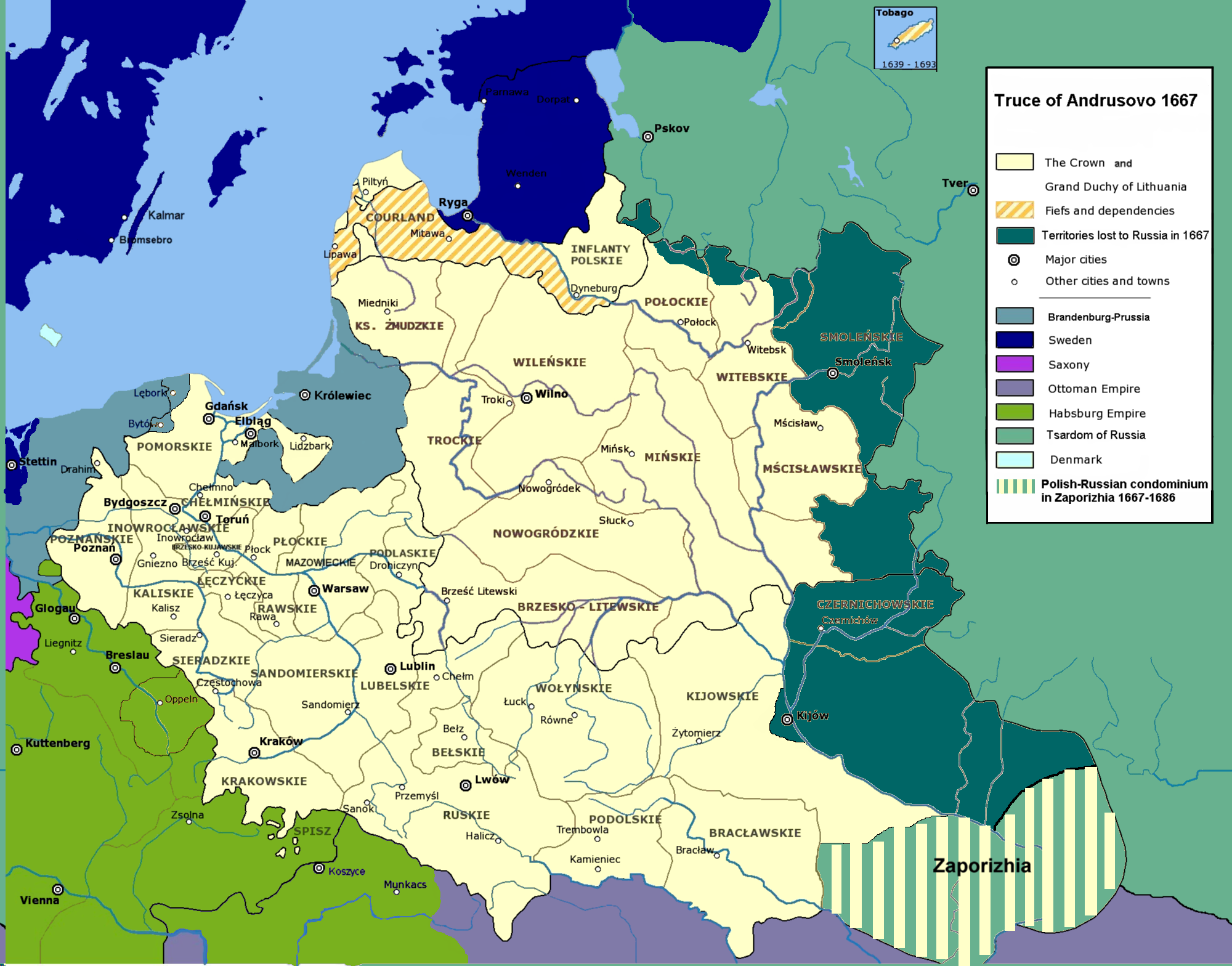
The loss of lands to Russia in the 1667 Truce of Andrusovo (dark green) forever changed the balance of power in Eastern Europe

John Casimir made one more attempt to reverse the losses and regain all of Ukraine by attacking the Tsardom in 1663 and 1664. While some of his forward units approached Moscow, fighting the Russian people and weather took its toll, which combined with the internal difficulties at home made the withdrawal unavoidable. The Commonwealth's failures encouraged anti-Polish sentiments in right-bank Ukraine. The popular uprisings there were subdued with great effort, with Hetman Czarniecki dying in the fighting in 1665. The Commonwealth nobility attempted return to their Ukrainian possessions and the warfare caused widespread destruction in Ukraine. In 1665, as the Crown forces were being withdrawn from right-bank Ukraine, the pro-Polish orientation among the Cossacks was greatly diminished and Teteria lost power.

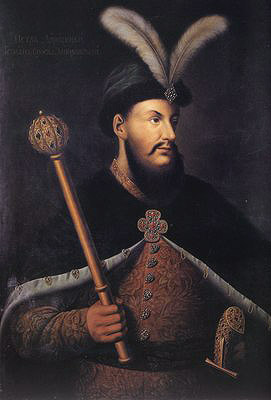
Petro Doroshenko

During the Polish–Cossack–Tatar War (1666–1671), on Dec. 19, 1666 the new right-bank hetman Petro Doroshenko renewed the Cossack-Tatar alliance and eliminated near Vinnytsia the Polish forces stationed in the region, ending in reality the Polish military rule over Ukraine. In the years that followed, Doroshenko led Cossack fighters and participated in political maneuvers involving the Commonwealth, Russia and the Ottoman Empire in vain pursuit of Bohdan Khmelnytsky's dream of building a strong Ukrainian state.

Under the pressure of the Ukrainian unrest and the threat of a Turkish–Tatar intervention, the Commonwealth and Russia signed in 1667 an agreement in the village of Andrusovo near Smolensk, according to which eastern Ukraine now belonged to Russia (with a high degree of local autonomy and an internal army). The truce's provisions were favorable to the Tsardom, which, through the territorial gains secured, stopped the Polish eastern expansion and facilitated its own future further movement to the west. The Smolensk, Chernihiv and Novhorod-Siverskyi regions were for Poland from now lost, in addition to left-bank Ukraine with Kiev and Zaporizhian Sich (the last entity for a short while remained under joint Russian-Polish supervision). "Polish Livonia", the Polotsk and Vitebsk voivodeships and area north of Dünaburg (Latgalia) were to be kept by the Commonwealth. Adjustments were still going to take place, but the eastern and northern Polish–Lithuanian borders had mainly stabilized, until the time of the First Partition.^{[a]}^{[b]}

=== Period of wars with the Ottoman Empire, John III Sobieski ===
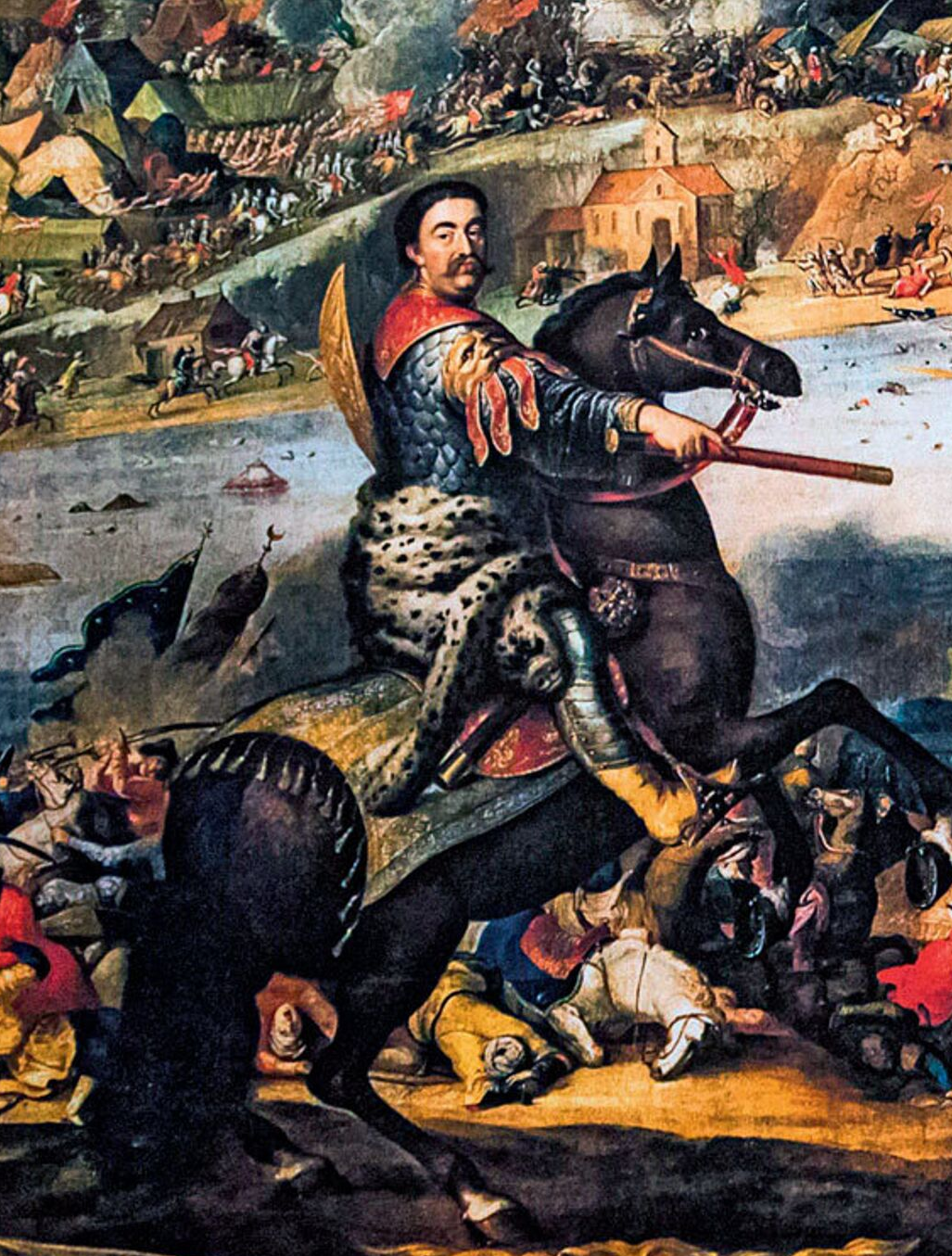
John Sobieski, the Commonwealth's last great victorious commander, at the Battle of Khotyn (1673)

The Ottoman Empire, which had previously been involved in Ukrainian affairs by Bohdan Khmelnytsky, now under the leadership of Sultan Mehmed IV and his Grand Vizier Ahmed Köprülü, interpreted the Ukrainian disorder as an opportunity for its own expansion in the region. The Commonwealth's friend, Tatar Khan Mehmed IV Giray was removed in 1666 and Petro Doroshenko, the Cossack hetman of right-bank Ukraine, seeking the threatened by the Polish-Russian negotiations unity of Ukraine, accepted Ottoman suzerainty. In fall of 1666, the Tatars eliminated the Commonwealth military units present in Dnieper Ukraine, but the 1667 sejm reduced the country's army to 20,000 nevertheless.

In 1667, when Tatar-Cossack forces attacked Lwów (Lviv), Hetman John Sobieski confronted them with a small force. After the Polish troops withstood two weeks of enemy assaults at the Battle of Podhajce (Pidhaitsi), the Tatars agreed to renew the alliance with the Commonwealth and Doroshenko acknowledged its authority.

Soon King John II Casimir Vasa abdicated and was replaced by the helpless Michał Korybut Wiśniowiecki, which coincided with intense factional infighting within the Commonwealth. Doroshenko's proposal of granting the Cossacks full autonomy in return for Ukraine's association with the Commonwealth was rejected, and a Polish committee nominated Mykhailo Khanenko for Doroshenko's hetman post. Doroshenko appealed for help to the Turks and their Tatar allies, but the Tatars were defeated twice by Sobieski, who in 1671 removed them and Doroshenko from the Bratslav Voivodeship.

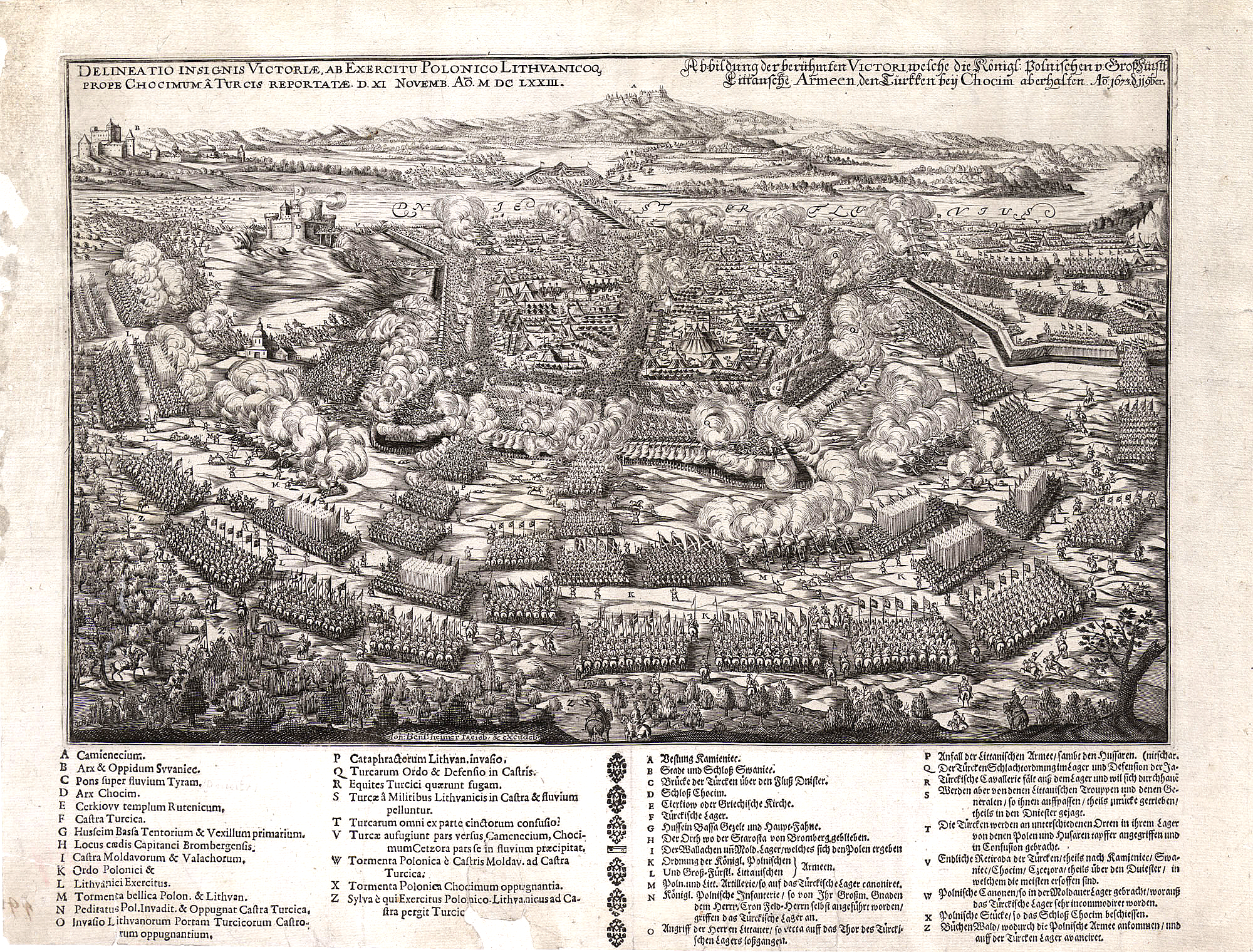
Battle of Khotyn (1673)

At that point, however, the Ottomans, having successfully concluded their war with Venice over Crete, were ready to wage a war on the Commonwealth. The war was officially declared and a great Turkish, Tatar and Cossack invasion force under Mehmed IV entered the Bratslav area and Podolia. The Commonwealth being in a state of internal disorder and incapable of effective defense, the foremost stronghold of Kamieniec Podolski (Kamianets-Podilskyi) capitulated, the Turkish army moved toward Lwów, while the Tatars raided west reaching the San River, taking huge numbers of civilian captives. Sobieski counterattacked moving south from Krasnystaw and freeing 44,000 of the enslaved, but that was not enough to prevent the signing of the Treaty of Buchach in October 1672, on humiliating for the Commonwealth terms. The Ottoman Empire took the Podolian, Bratslav and Kiev voivodeships and accepted a big yearly monetary "gift".

This outcome had a sobering effect in Poland. Bickering stopped, the 1673 sejm funded a 50,000 strong army, diplomatic arrangements were made to assure neutrality of the Crimean Khanate and Russian cooperation. Hetman Sobieski's military offensive commenced in the fall.

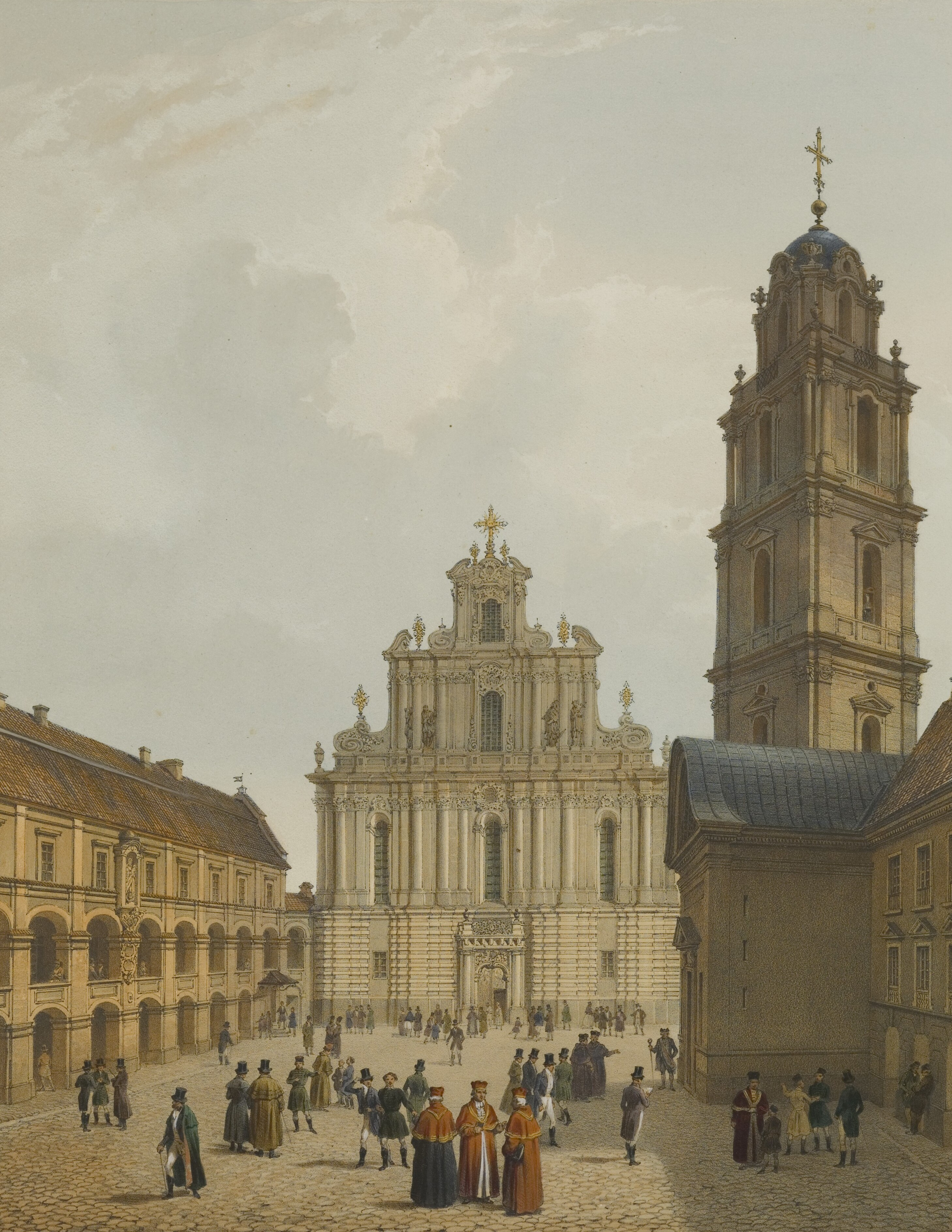
The Jesuit College in Wilno (Vilnius) became Vilnius University under King Stephen Báthory

Sobieski decided to attack the largest of the three Turkish corps, stationed at Khotyn, where another battle with the Ottoman Empire took place half a century earlier. The Battle of Khotyn was won when Sobieski's infantry and cavalry stormed and took over the reinforced enemy positions, at the former camp of Hetman Chodkiewicz. With a broken bridge on the Dniester River, the trapped Ottoman army was destroyed on Nov. 11, 1673. The battle was the greatest by that time land victory over the Ottoman Empire in Europe.

Detrimental to further military progress was the death of King Michał Wiśniowecki. Lithuanian Hetman Michał Pac's refusal to fight under Sobieski's orders forced Sobieski to abandon his intended move toward the Danube. The Polish units that had taken over Jassy in Moldavia were soon forced out by the Turks, who were able to reconnect with their other concentration of troops in Kamieniec Podolski.

John Sobieski, elected in 1674 as King John III, continued the war with Turkey. In 1674 Russia undertook its own military action against the Ottoman Empire and became a subject of a Turkish offensive, aimed at aiding their ally Doroshenko, at that time under Russian siege in Chyhyryn. Sobieski militarily supported Russia, recovering the Bratslav area from the Turks in process. In 1675 Sobieski defeated the Turkish-Tatar forces heading for Lwów, while the Defense of Trembowla and the approaching Polish rescue stopped the enemy's main force, subsequently withdrawn into Moldavia. Another factor contributing to the Ottoman pullout were the successes of the Russians, leading to their takeover of Chyhyryn and subjugation of Doroshenko.

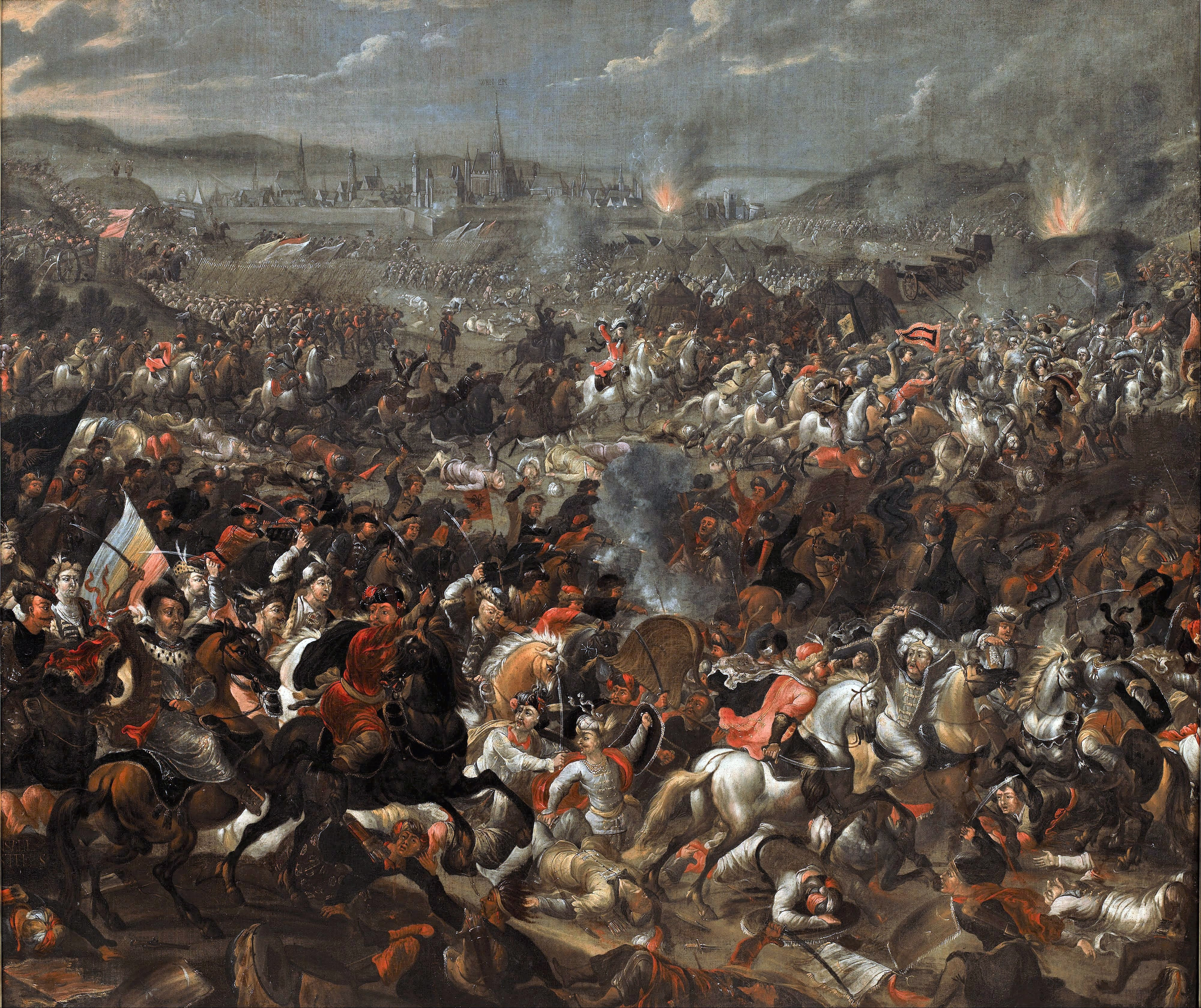
King John III Sobieski at Vienna by Gonzales Franciscus Casteels

The outcome of the warfare was determined by the campaign of 1676, in conjunction with the negotiations and diplomatic activity that followed. The Ottoman army entered Pokuttya and moving up the Dniester River was confronted by King Sobieski at the Battle of Żurawno. The outnumbered Poles withstood two weeks of enemy assaults, after which a truce was agreed on through French mediation. It had still left Podolia with Kamieniec, Bratslav and other areas in Turkish hands. Ukrainian fortresses had to be given up in light of Ottoman successes in the war with Russia. Therefore, from the Commonwealth point of view, the Żurawno treaty constituted no more than a temporary armistice.

Peace with Turkey was however the aim of John III Sobieski, who, faced with a new situation in Europe after the Treaty of the Pyrenees, wished to pursue an ambitious policy in the more crucial for the Commonwealth Baltic Sea area.

France had become the greatest European power and seeking further hegemony was looking for alliances against its competitors. The Ottoman Empire and Sweden were already important for France as anti-Habsburg components, and the Commonwealth, in peace with Sweden after the Treaty of Oliva, became the next candidate. Poland had however traditionally been linked to Austria, and trying to break this relationship, which had many magnate supporters, filled the time of the reign of Louis XIV.

The pro-French camp was formed in Poland already in the 1660s, in part upon the prodding by Queen Marie Louise, and Jan Sobieski was its member. Their plans of electing a French minded candidate for the Commonwealth crown became frustrated when Michał Korybut Wiśniowiecki married Eleonora Maria of Austria. The protracted Polish-Ottoman fighting suited Vienna politicians well, since protected on the southeastern flank by the Commonwealth's involvement, they were able to commit fully to the war with France.

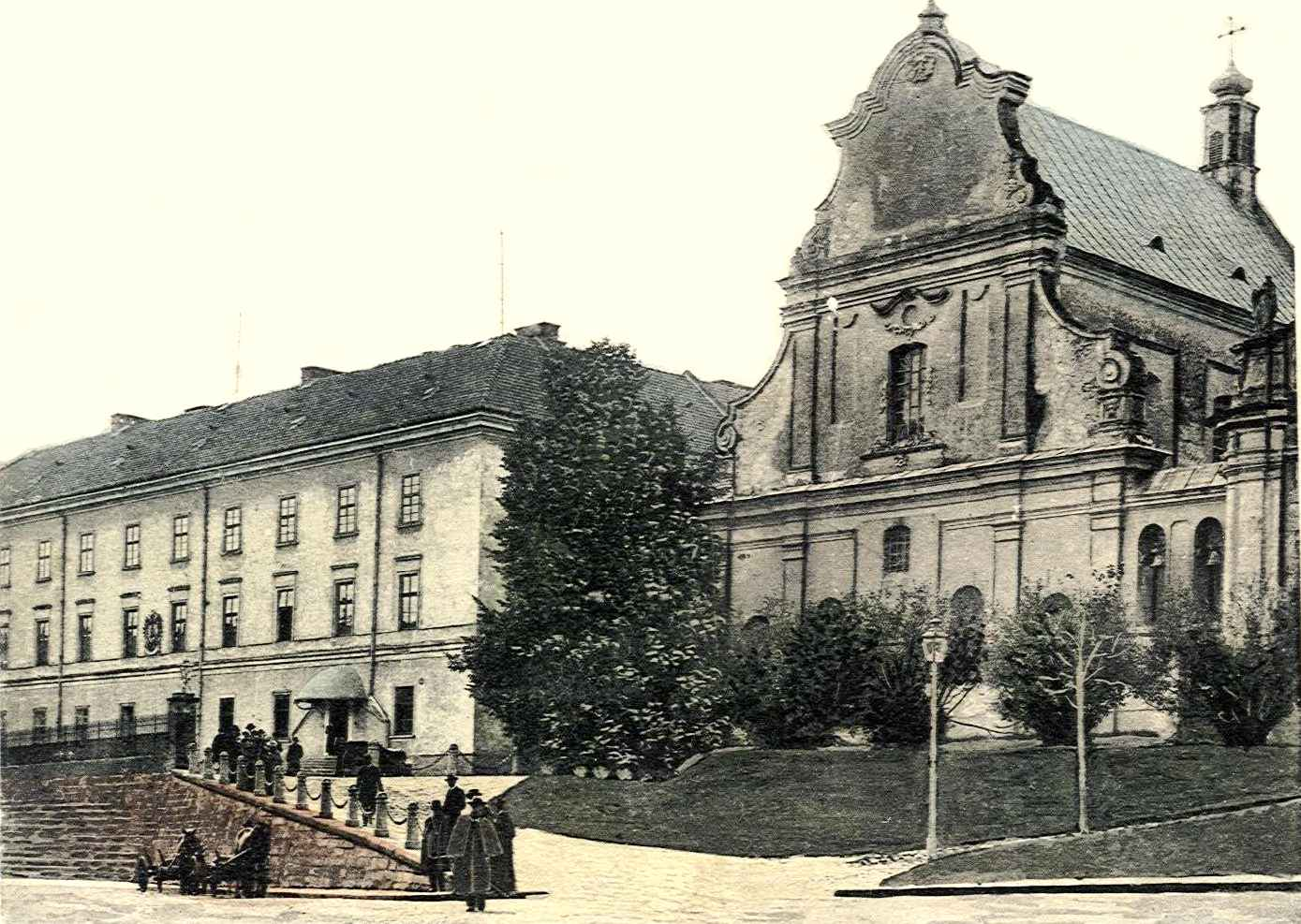
The university in Lwów (Lviv), established by King John Casimir, like its Vilnius counterpart originated as a Jesuit college

The 1674 election of John Sobieski, married to the French-born Marie Louise, appeared to have strengthened the pro-French faction decisively. A secret Treaty of Yavoriv was signed a year later between the Polish king and Louis XIV, providing for French compensation for a planned war against Frederick William and his Margraviate of Brandenburg, doubled in case of a war also with Austria. Poland was going to cooperate militarily with Sweden and be rewarded in the end with the Duchy of Prussia, possibly also some acquisitions in Silesia.

The French-Polish intentions were to be thwarted by both the international and Commonwealth internal obstacles. Austria and Brandenburg in turn provided funds for the King's rivals to tie his hands. Vienna and Moscow signed their own treaty against Sobieski's policies, in which for the first time the external powers pledged to defend szlachta's "liberties", the guarantees of the Commonwealth's weakness. Most importantly the Swedes failed in their military endeavors.

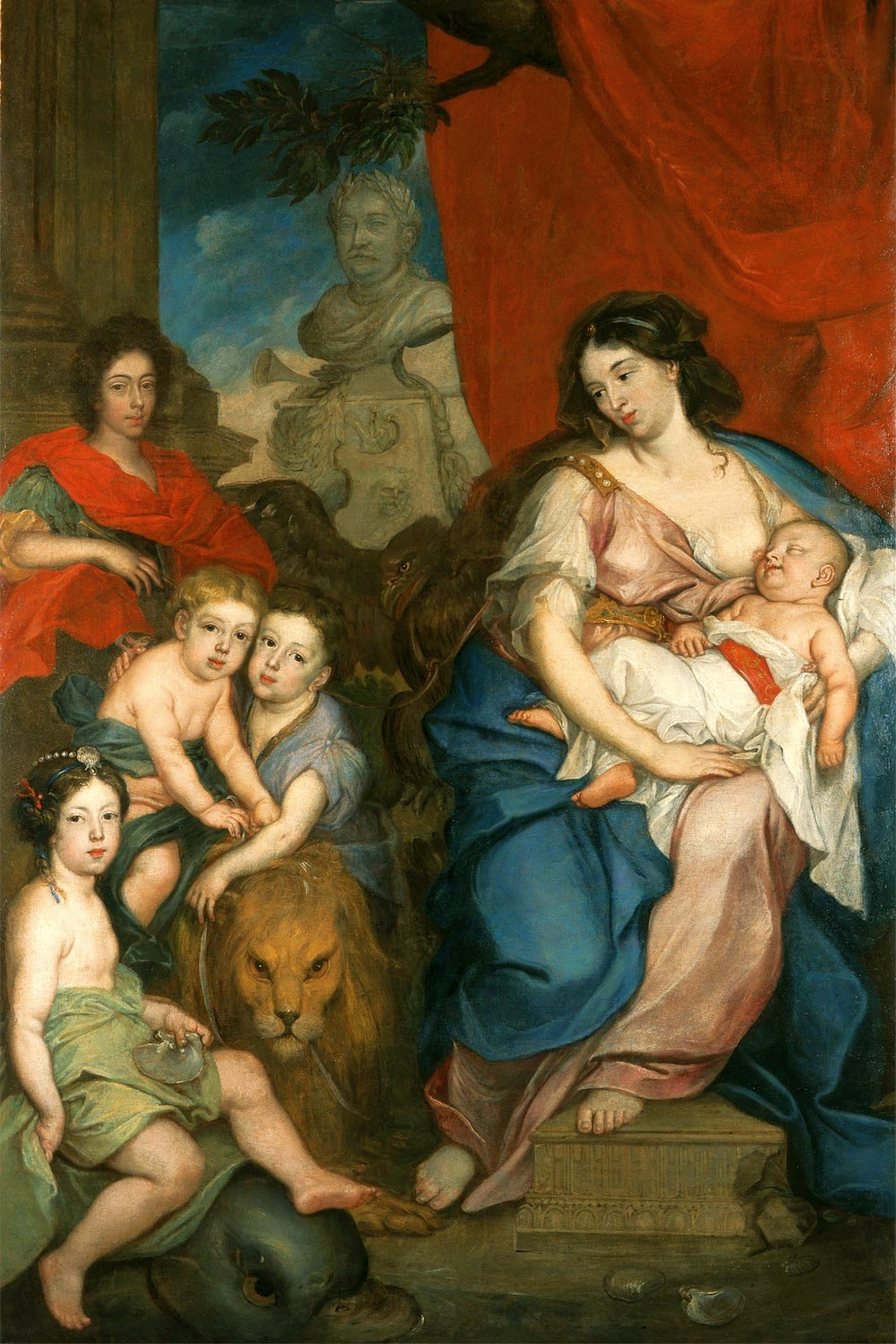
King Sobieski's wife, Queen Marie Casimire or Marysieńka, with children. The politically active queen governed the country during the last several years of the King's life and pushed for a close alliance with France of Louis XIV.

Coming from the west in Pomerania the Swedish forces were defeated and Frederick William took Stettin again. The attempt to take over the Duchy of Prussia fell likewise. In 1677, a secret Polish–Swedish understanding was signed in Danzig, according to which John III agreed to let the Swedes pass through Livonia into Prussia, in addition to strengthening them with his own forces. The Swedish intervention became badly delayed and ended in another defeat. Only Louis XIV's diplomatic activities prevented the Swedes from losing Stettin.

In addition to conducting this last assertive Commonwealth attempt in the Baltic area, John III for a time was also involved in anti-Habsburg diversion in Hungary, engulfed by the Kuruc uprising led by Imre Thököly. The Hungarian rebels were helped with volunteers and supply, and in 1677 with a military expedition led into Hungary by Hieronim Lubomirski.

As the King failed to convince the nobility of the necessity of action in the north, the country's establishment directed its attention back toward the recovery of the lands lost in the east. Russia however was now seen as an ally against the Ottoman power. In order to reclaim the areas lost to Turkey in the south-east and to reestablish influence in Moldavia, John III sought to build a grand European anti-Ottoman league. While his ideas met with cool reception in most European centers of power, except for the papacy and Vienna, Turkey's own military undertakings worked in favor of Sobieski's plans.

Mehmed IV, having concluded in 1681 the war with Russia, was getting ready to take up the defense of Thököly and move against Austria. Facing a choice of leaving the Habsburg state to its own fate or forming with it a coalition to defeat the Ottoman invaders, Sobieski chose the second option, distancing himself from and acting internally against the pro-French camp.

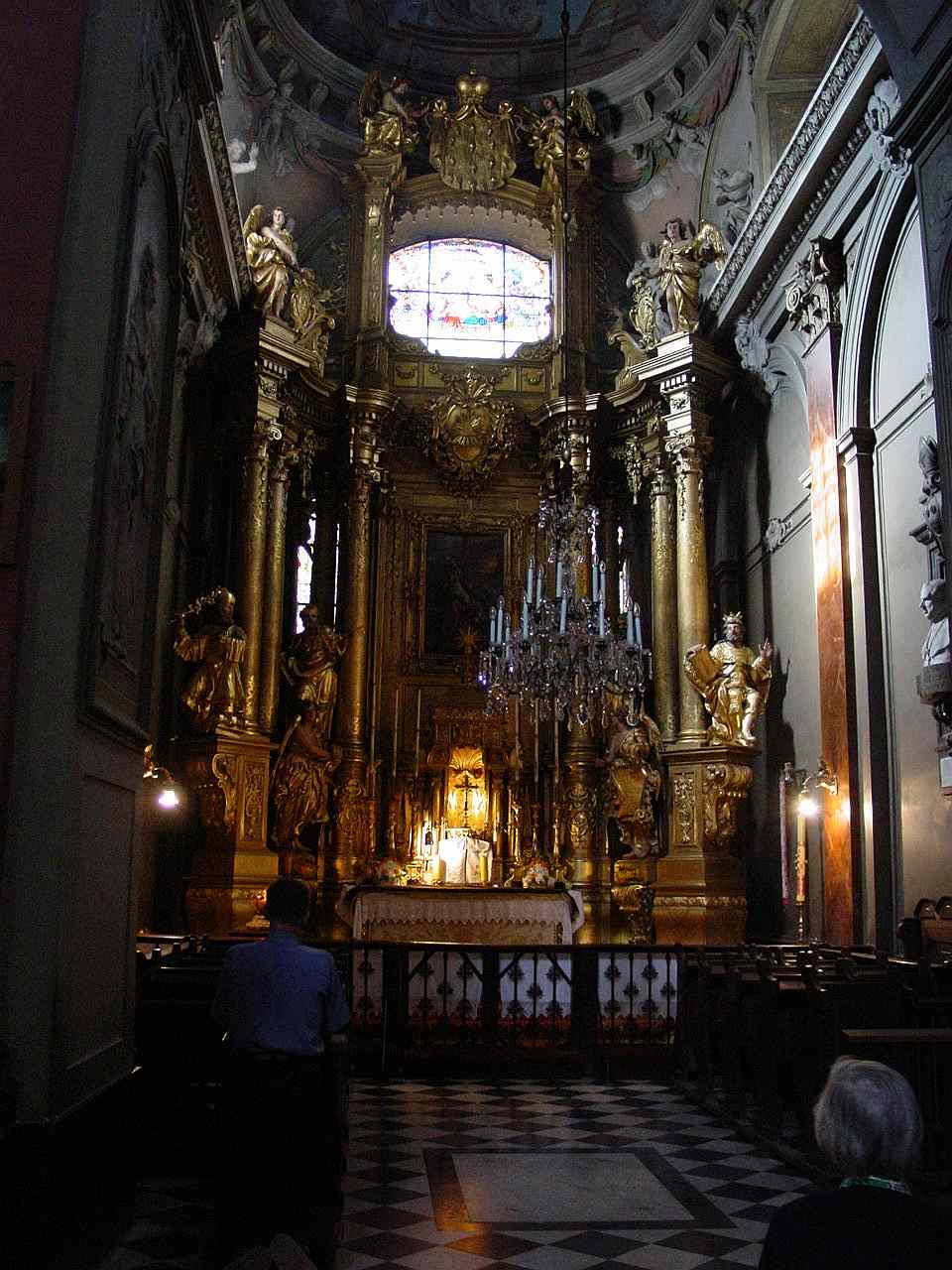
Latin Cathedral in Lviv

The limited mutual defense alliance with Austria was approved in the Sejm and signed on April 1, 1683. It provided for mutual rescue obligation in the event of an enemy attack on either Kraków or Vienna. Indeed, in July, the over 100,000 strong Ottoman army led by Kara Mustafa Pasha laid a siege to Vienna.

Hieronim Lubomirski had already been fighting the Turks to help Emperor Leopold, and Sobieski quickly marched his 25,000 men to the Vienna battlefield area, where they complemented an allied army of 70,000 total, comprised also of Austrians and Germans. Sobieski took command of the attack on the besiegers and the main battle took place on September 12, 1683. Heavily involved in the fighting were the Commonwealth infantry, artillery and cavalry. Thousands of the Polish Hussar horsemen were famously involved in the victorious assault on Kara Mustafa's camp. The Ottoman offensive capabilities were broken, even though Kara Mustafa was able to save from the rout a portion of his retreating army. Vienna, the gateway to the West, was spared the fate of Constantinople.

The pursuit of the enemy resulted in the two Battles of Párkány. In the first confrontation Sobieski was subjected to a surprise attack, and only two days later, on October 9, together with the Austrians, the Poles destroyed the Turkish army defending the north Hungarian Ottoman possessions.

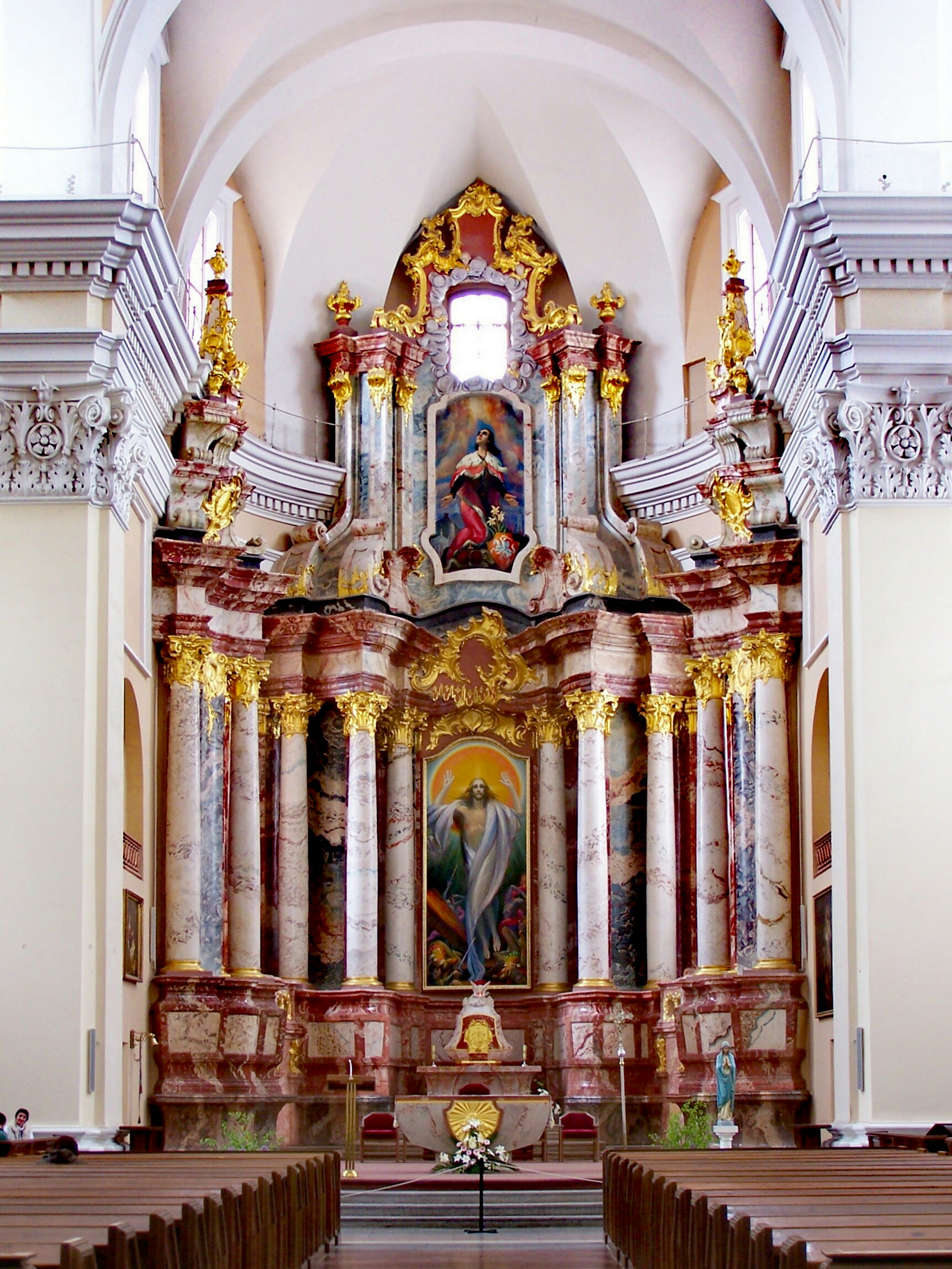
St. Casimir's Church in Vilnius

At this juncture, a protectorate by the Commonwealth was sought by the leaders of Hungary, Transylvania and Moldavia. Actively pursuing these relations would require confronting the Habsburg Monarchy. Not willing or able to do so, King John III decided to join the Holy League (1684), an anti-Ottoman alliance and the last European crusade project, consisting also of the papal state, Venice and the Holy Roman Empire. The pact's basic goals were recovery of the lost territories and common fight until the time of a commonly agreed peace. The Holy League arrangements severely limited the Commonwealth's ability to exercise its options and future reverses can be traced to the failure of the decentralized, ineffective Polish diplomacy to protect through negotiations the country's national interest.

King Sobieski, euphoric after the Vienna victory, lacked a sense of realistic political judgment. Neglecting the recovery of Kamieniec, he unsuccessfully attacked the Turks in Moldavia. Then pressed by the Emperor's and Pope's diplomacies he agreed, to motivate Russia to join the war with the Ottoman Empire, to an "eternal" peace treaty with the Tsardom, signed in Moscow in 1686. The treaty confirmed and adjusted further Russia's previous (Truce of Andrusovo) territorial gains, and granted Russia the right to intervene in the Commonwealth to protect the interests of its Eastern Orthodox population. Russia's negotiated obligations fell short of a full anti-Ottoman involvement. In 1686 Russia joined the Holy League.

The decisive reckoning with the Ottoman Empire was supposed to have taken place in 1686, through a coordinated attack of the Holy League allies on the various Ottoman provinces. The coordination turned out to be poor and the large force gathered by John III for a Danube offensive conducted no significant military operations. This and another failed expedition into Moldavia in 1691 mark the twilight of the Commonwealth's military might.

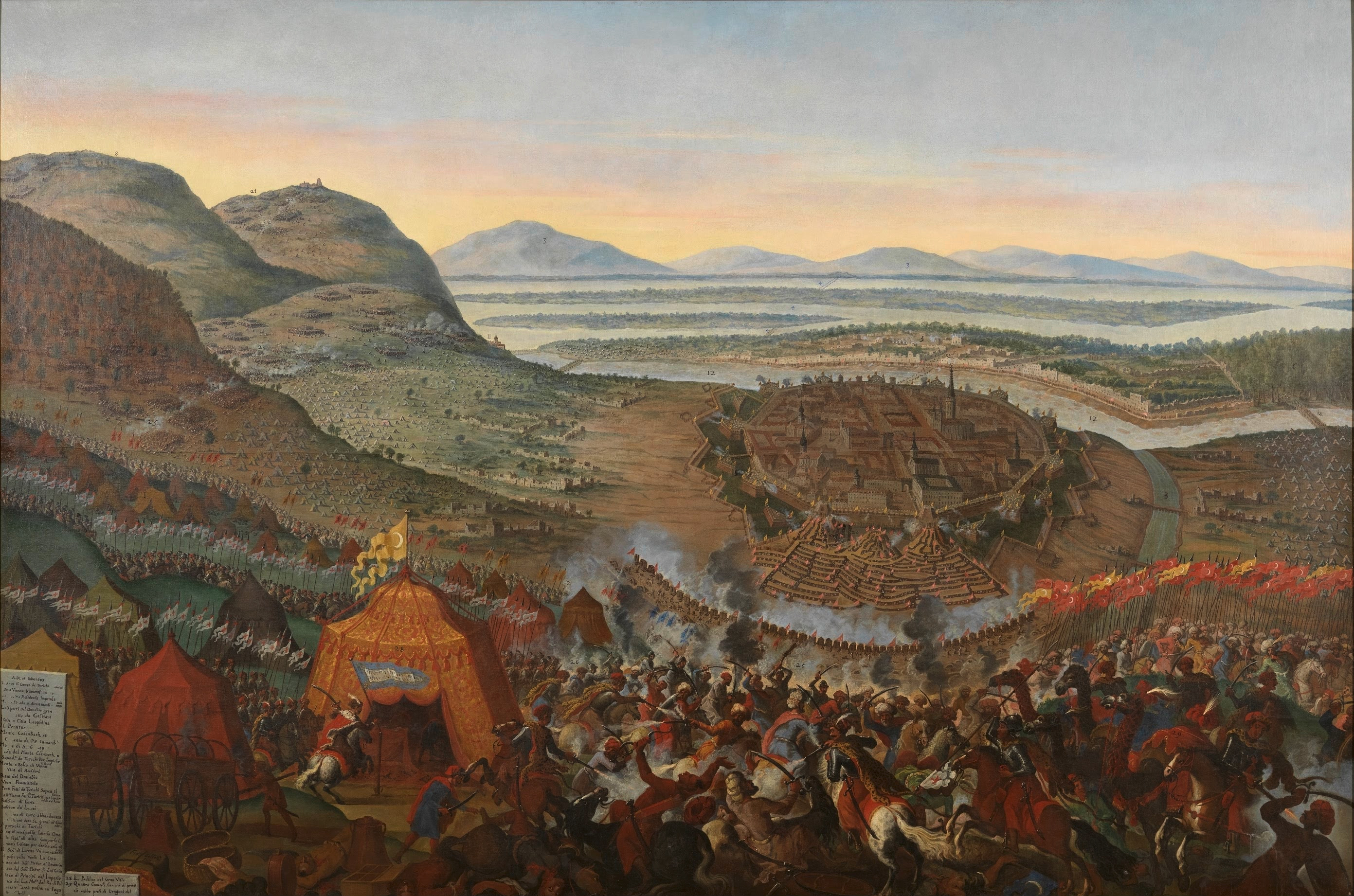
Battle of Vienna 1683 by Frans Geffels

For the rest of his life the ailing king hesitated between a pro-Habsburg and pro-French policy. His son Jakub Ludwik Sobieski married Hedwig of Neuburg, sister of the Empress. Queen Marie Casimire, promoting an alliance with France, signed herself in 1692 a treaty with Louis XIV, but was unable to persuade her husband, who felt bound by the Holy League loyalties, to do likewise.

After Sobieski's death, King Augustus II the Strong attempted another anti-Ottoman Commonwealth campaign, during which only the Battle of Podhajce (1698) was fought. The final Treaty of Karlowitz concluded in 1699 the Holy League's wars with the Ottoman Empire. The Commonwealth ended up recovering Podolia with Kamieniec Podolski and the Bratslav region. The Austrian Habsburg Monarchy, expanded by Hungary and Transylvania, had become the leading Central European power.

After the turn of the century, in Polish Ukraine there was no Ruthenian nobility left (the few survivors of the many wars sought refuge on the left-bank of the Dnieper River) and the right-bank Cossack Hetmanate no longer existed. During the 18th century thousands of Polish szlachta families and hundreds of thousands of Polish peasants arrived and resettled the devastated and depopulated Ukrainian lands. The left-bank Hetmanate fought under Ivan Mazepa, but was ruthlessly pacified by the Russians and eventually destroyed.

The wars fought by the Commonwealth during the second half of the 17th century fulfilled their main role of protecting as much as possible of the eastern possessions, where latifundia of the magnates were for the most part located. More comprehensive foreign policy needs were neglected, the functioning of the state had become even more disorganized and the military effort and destruction contributed to further disintegration of the economy.

=== Magnate oligarchies, decline of central government ===
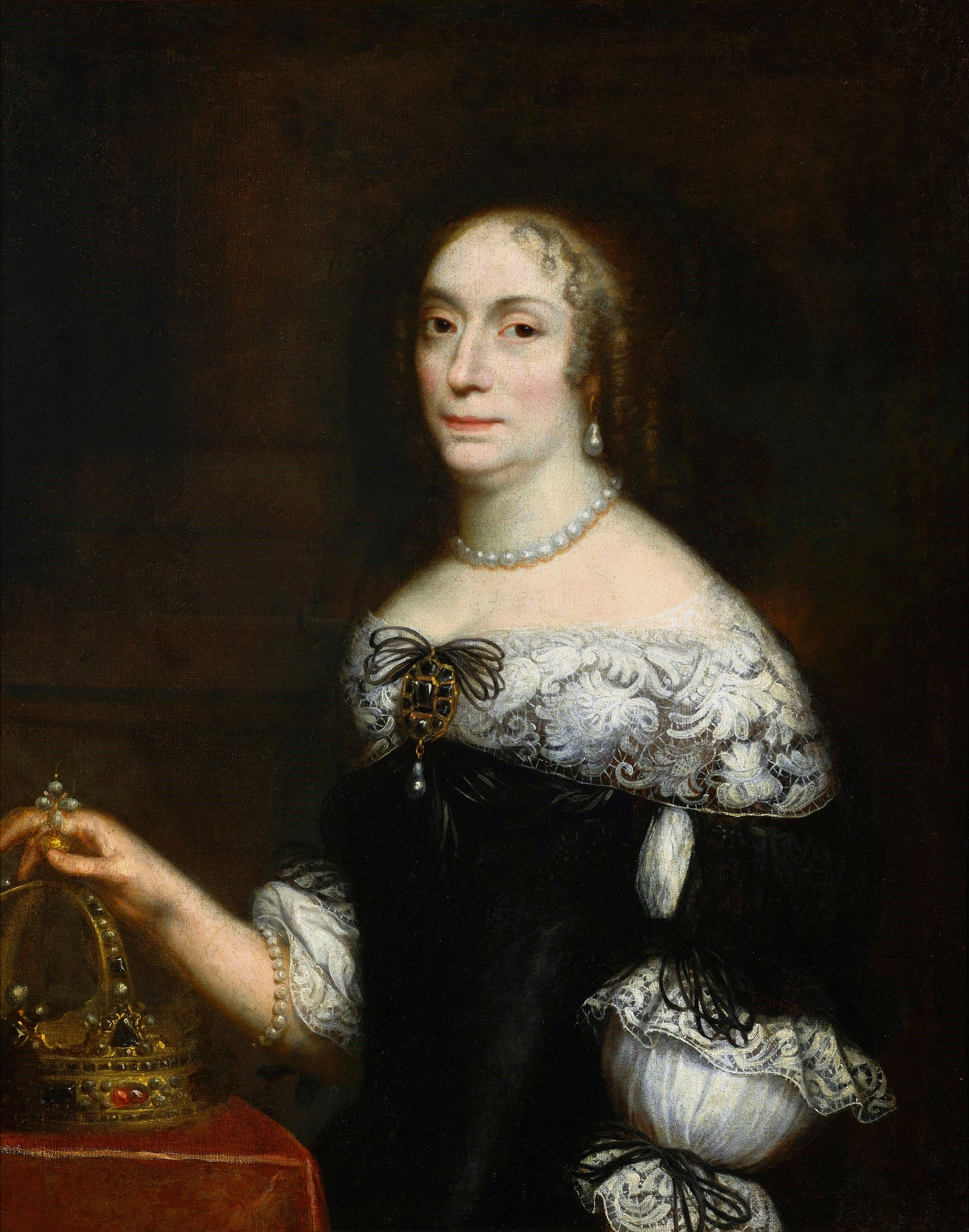
Queen Marie Louise Gonzaga died before the abdication of King John II Casimir Vasa

The reigns of John II Casimir Vasa, Michael Korybut Wiśniowiecki and John III Sobieski brought further downgrading and loss of effectiveness of governmental authority, both in the domain of royal control and in the areas of legislative (central and local) ability to function and power. With the diminished fortunes of regular szlachta, the struggle for power and the rather feeble, but still present attempts to reform the system took place within the changing alliances of powerful magnates and royal courts. From the time of John Casimir and his wife Marie Louise, who cared about the well-being of the Commonwealth, but were obsessively preoccupied with the issue of royal succession, the Polish–Lithuanian state was informally divided into a number of territorial domains, practically controlled by regional top feudal lords, inclined to pursue their private and familial interests in the first place.

Janusz Radziwiłł, the most powerful magnate of Lithuania, is credited with being responsible for the first instance of the liberum veto act, which was used to break the deliberations of the sejm of 1652. This widely abused practice eventually led to a paralysis of most of significant legislative activity, and through their szlachta surrogates was used by foreign powers to prevent internal reform in the Commonwealth.

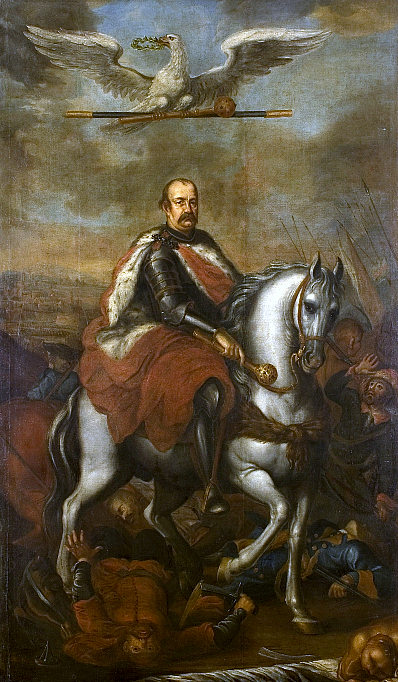
Jerzy Sebastian Lubomirski glorified as a military hero

John Casimir's poor relations with the magnates contributed to his initial alienation from the Commonwealth's nobility and armed forces in 1655 at the time of the Swedish Deluge. In 1658 the King, supported by the more patriotic faction of the szlachta, postulated a reform program, which included the introduction of majority voting rules in parliamentary assemblies. The proposal was supported by the Senate in 1658 and considered by the Sejm, which in 1659 established a committee for implementing new procedures, but the reforms soon became a victim of disagreements over the vivente rege and royal succession issues. Although during the sejm of 1661 John Casimir predicted and warned of partition of the Commonwealth by Russia, Brandenburg and Austria if unsettled successions cause significant interregnum periods, by that time the reform program had been defeated and the army remained unpaid.

Hetman Jerzy Sebastian Lubomirski was the central figure among the opposition responsible for the defeat of the royal couple's undertakings and attempted reforms. With his inspiration confederations of unpaid soldiers were established in 1661 in the Crown and in Lithuania. The army confederations lasted for two years, forced the parliament to come up with large sums of money, devastated estates and put an end to what was left of the reform processes.

Marie Louise tried to force Lubomirski to leave the country. In 1664 he was accused of high treason and sentenced by the sejm court to banishment, confiscation of property, infamy and removal from state offices held. Lubomirski sought imperial protection in Silesia, where he gathered an army and conducted diplomatic activities aimed at forming an international coalition against the Polish King.

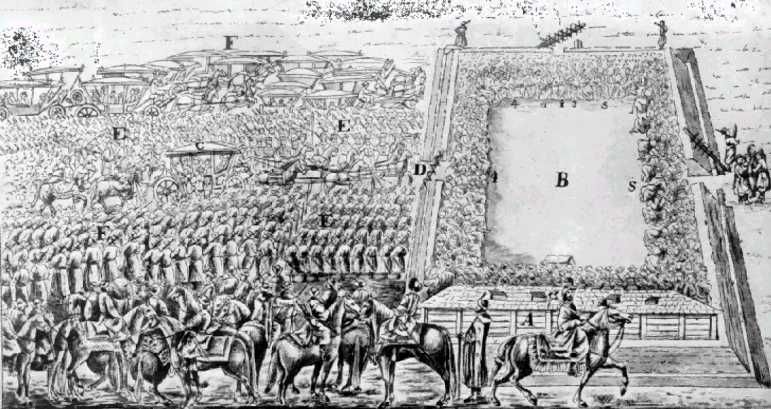
Election of King Michał Korybut Wiśniowiecki on Wola fields in 1669

In 1665 Lubomirski entered the Commonwealth in an act of open rebellion known as Lubomirski's Rokosz. The main military confrontation took place in July 1666 near Inowrocław (Battle of Mątwy), where rebel forces slaughtered thousands of the King's best troops. The victory brought no great advantage to Lubomirski, who left the country again and soon died, but John Casimir was obliged to formally abandon his and the Queen's vivente rege election attempts. After the contentious and broken sejm of 1668, the King abdicated and rejected numerous appeals for reconsideration. He still took steps to influence his succession, apologized for his errors (the balance of the reign was clearly negative) and predicted again the ultimate demise of the Polish–Lithuanian Commonwealth.

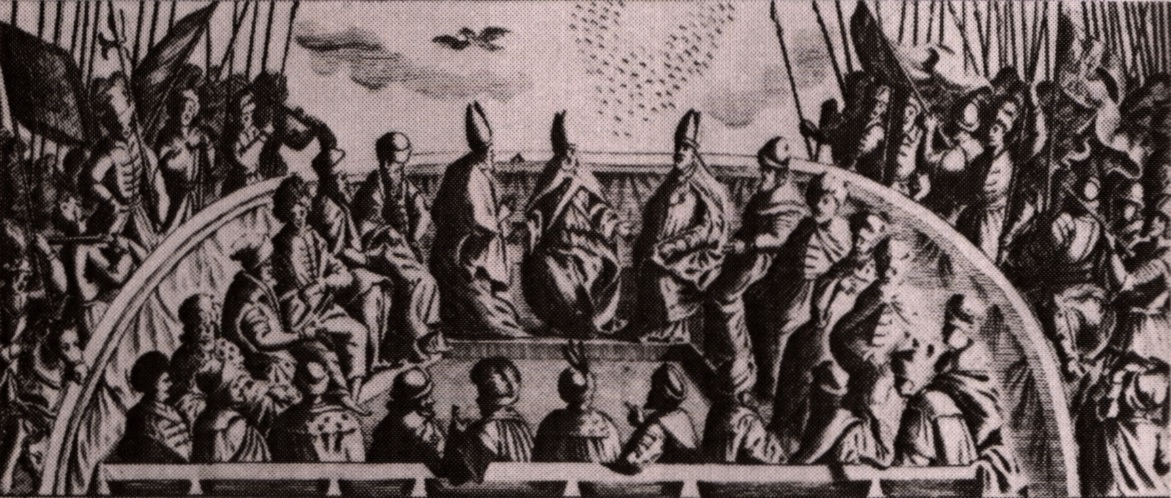
Election close-up shows the senators surrounded by the szlachta

With the disintegration of the system, and of the functionality of central and local parliamentary assemblies in particular, confederations had assumed an important role, as a substitute but necessary mode of governance. Confederations, which in reality usually constituted more closely knit magnate factions, were temporary (lasting up to several years) associations, whose members were at times pressured into joining, but were sworn and often deeply committed. Confederate decisions were generally made by a majority of votes. All nobility could join, and there was some urban participation. A confederation was led by a marshal and a council and was typically directed against a monarch or aspired to defend the country from foreign oppression.

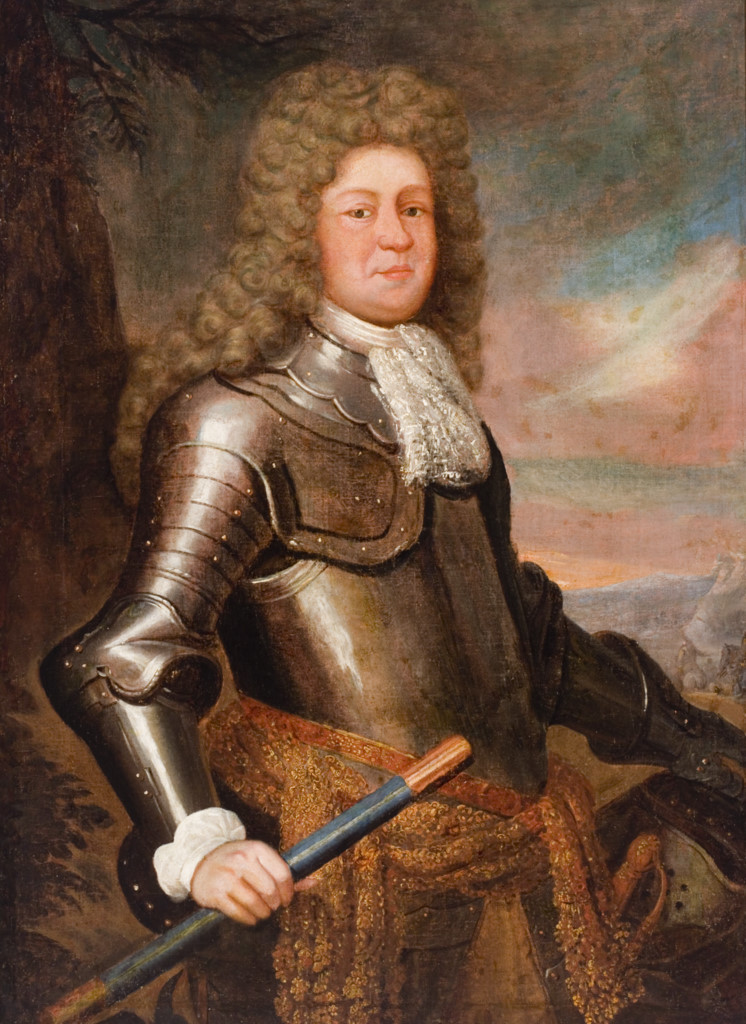
King Michael Korybut Wiśniowiecki

During the election of 1669 the gathered szlachta unexpectedly flexed their muscle and acted against the leading magnate parties. After the convocation sejm excluded all candidates that in some way had violated the legal process, the rowdy crowd demonstrated its preference for mediocrity by choosing the incompetent and inept Michał Korybut Wiśniowiecki. Wiśniowiecki, advised by the Vice-Chancellor, Bishop Andrzej Olszowski, married Eleanor of Austria, who became well regarded for her tenure as the Queen of Poland.

The resulting closer relationship with the Austrian Habsburg state contributed to drawing the Commonwealth to its sphere of alliances and into conflicts with the Ottoman Empire.

Displeased by the growing Austrian influence, the pro-French camp led by Primate Mikołaj Prażmowski and Hetman Jan Sobieski, became very active undermining King Michał's rule. Liberum veto had become entrenched further when the sejm of 1669 was broken before its statutory term expired. In 1672, after more legislative attempts were thwarted and as the Commonwealth was facing an imminent Ottoman invasion, Prażmowski demanded the King's abdication and Michał responded by calling up pospolite ruszenie turned into the Confederation of Gołąb, ostensibly for the country's defense, but in fact to protect and promote the monarch's faction.

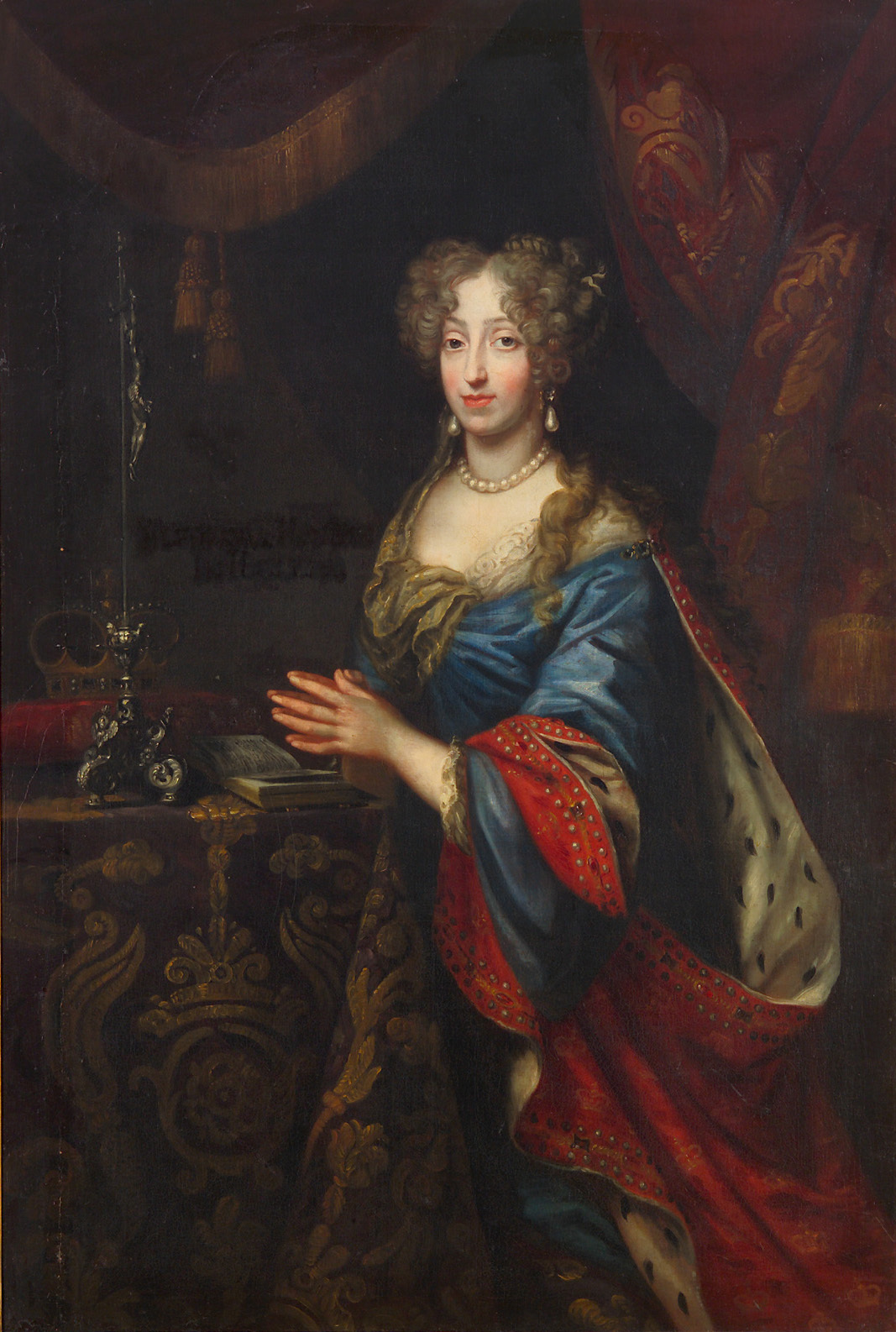
Eleanor of Austria, Queen of Poland

Humiliated by the Treaty of Buchach the Commonwealth faced also a civil war, as Sobieski, dismissed from his office by the Gołąb Confederation, established a competing Confederation of Szczebrzeszyn. After fruitless bickering and the death of the pro-French party's royal candidate, urged by wartime necessities, the two confederations eventually became reconciled in 1673. The accord made possible a common sejm, which was able to come up with the necessary fiscal and military measures.

After Michał Wiśniowiecki's death, the election of 1674 elevated John Sobieski, who because of the recent field successes on the Ottoman front was able to outdistance other early favorites, including Duke Charles of Lorraine. Sobieski was an educated and well-traveled man of many interests and pursuits, son of Jakub Sobieski, an accomplished parliamentarian and diplomat. A great military leader, John III Sobieski became fascinated by the possibility of establishing a natively Polish ruling dynasty, and like his predecessors he allowed the succession issue to consume his attention in vain, at the expense of urgent matters of the deteriorating state.

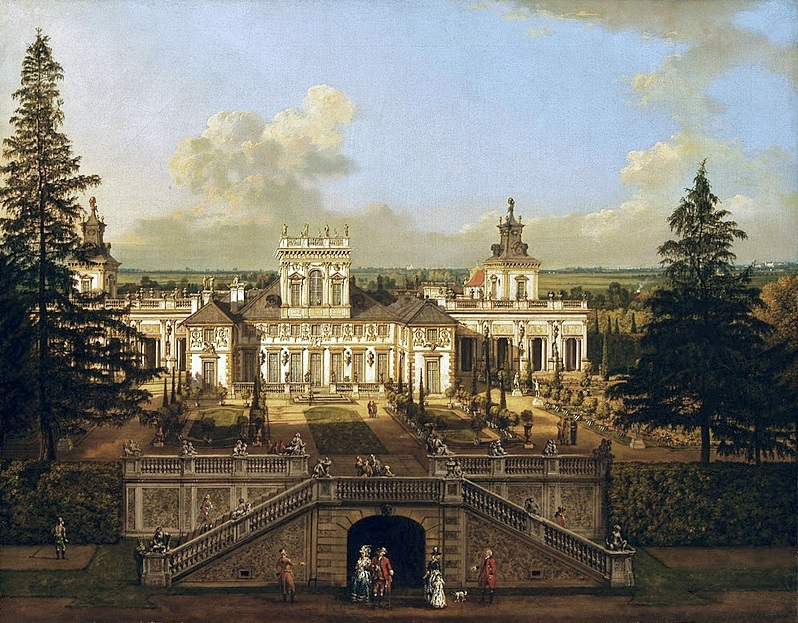
King John III Sobieski died in Wilanów near Warsaw, where he had built a splendid palace

John III initially intended to implement his various plans, including a conquest of the Duchy of Prussia, succession for his descendants and parliamentary reform, through an alliance with France. Facing determined opposition from the pro-Austrian magnate camp, after 1678 the King abandoned his pro-French policies and collaborators. Deprived as a result of significant domestic support for his projects, Sobieski from 1686 also had to contend with Austria, Brandenburg and Sweden, which agreed to act together to prevent changes in the Polish free election system (Russia and Austria joined in similar understanding already in 1675).

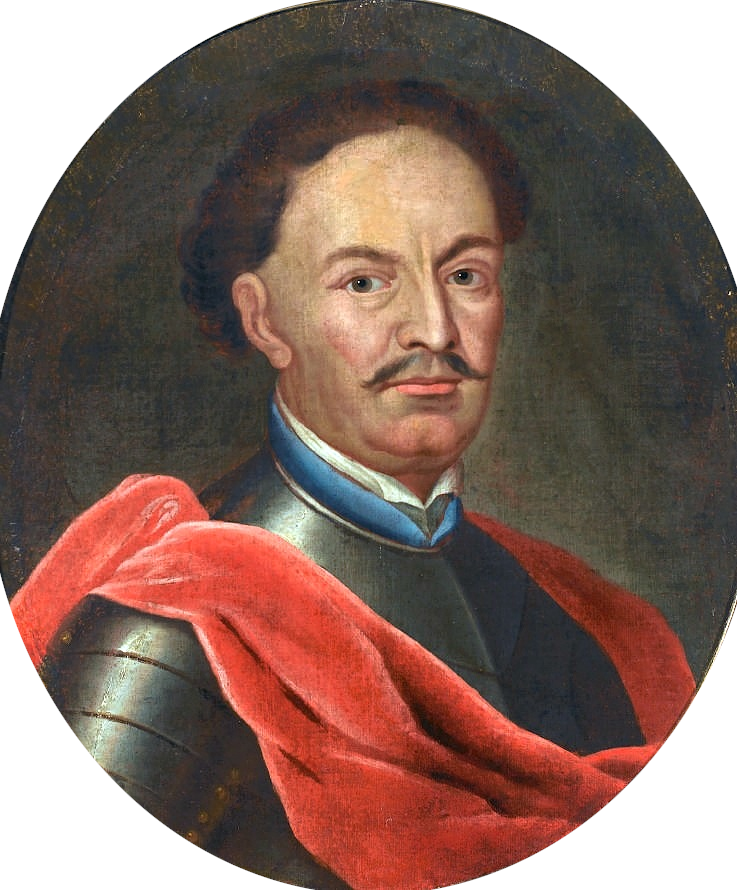
Hieronim Lubomirski

During the sejm of 1688/1689 the King's supporters demanded decisive action against the increasingly bold domestic opposition, but John III was growing weak and refrained from forcefully acting against his enemies and pursuing his aspirations.

The 1691 marriage of Jakub Ludwik Sobieski, the King's eldest son, with Hedwig of Neuburg, resulted in moderate improvement of relations with Vienna.

The last years of the reign of the ailing king saw the disorder, lawlessness, factional infighting and anarchy overcoming the Commonwealth. The monarch was not even able to control the feud between his wife Marie Casimire and their son Jakub. John III's death in 1696 commenced the longest, most contentious and corrupted interregnum in the country's history.

== Commonwealth–Saxony personal union ==
=== Early Wettin rule, Great Northern War ===
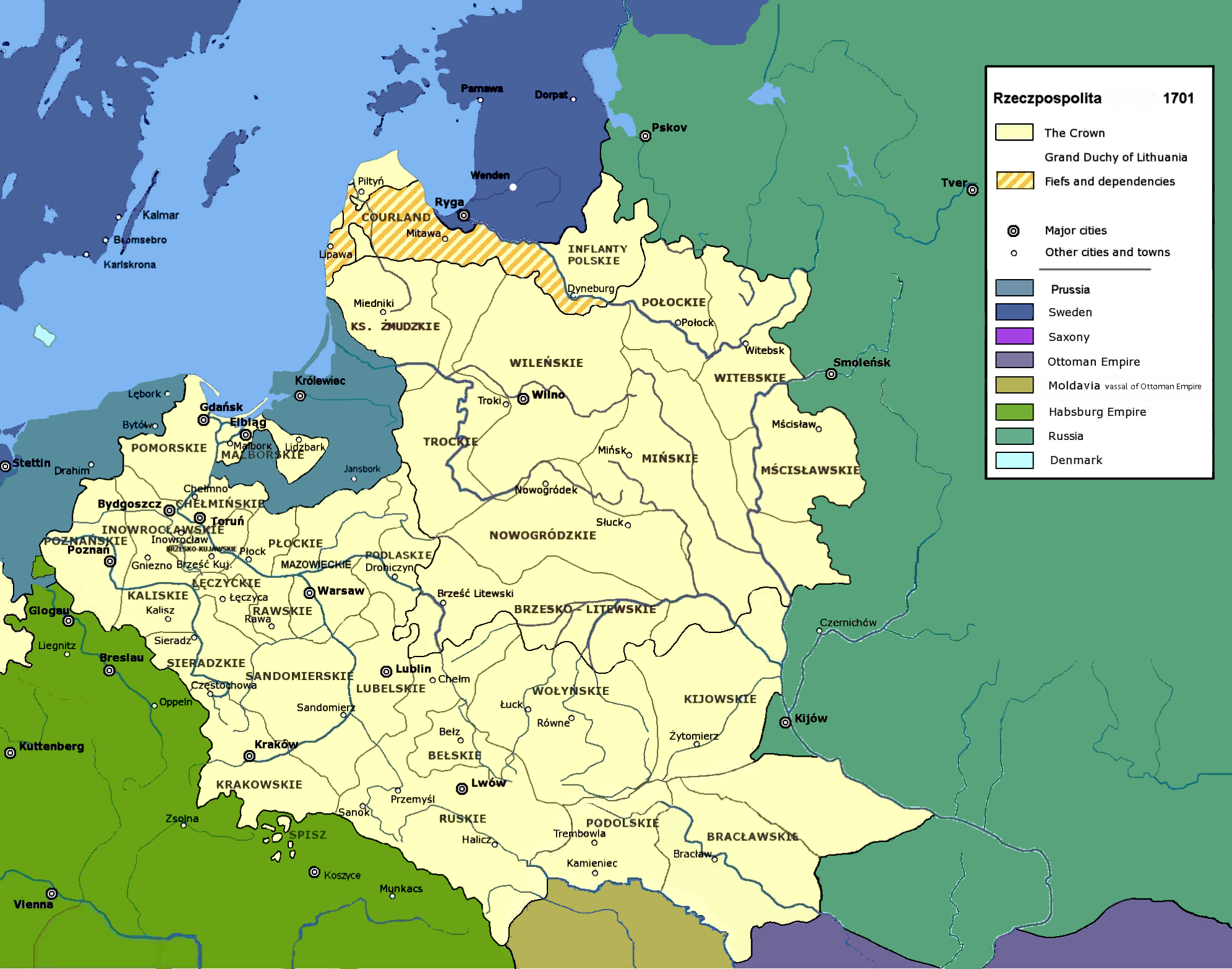
The Polish–Lithuanian Commonwealth in 1701

The situation in the Commonwealth had changed to some degree after the election of 1697 and the unexpected ascent of Augustus II the Strong of the House of Wettin, the ruler (as Frederick Augustus I) of the affluent Electorate of Saxony. He invested large sums, obtained foreign support and converted to Catholicism to ensure his election, but the voting process did not give him a clear victory. The early favorite, François Louis, Prince of Conti, had many supporters and was proclaimed a king-elect by the Primate, Michał Stefan Radziejowski. Augustus and his followers acted however more quickly and decisively than the French prince, whose belated arrival in Danzig area, where he sailed, but was blocked by supporters of Augustus from landing in the city, was not enough to prevent the Saxon from gaining the throne. This result was confirmed, after the initial unrest, by the "pacification sejm" in 1699.

The personal union of the Commonwealth and Saxony lasted for over half a century, but joined two basically dissimilar political and economic entities, each of which resented the close integration and unification persistently attempted by Augustus. This difficulty naturally checked the ruler's "absolutist" tendencies in both states and his pursuit of the Wettin family dynastic domination. The ambitious and able Augustus, who aspired to follow in the footsteps of Louis XIV without regard for the practical limitations of his particular situation, weakened by his adventurous undertakings both Poland and Saxony.

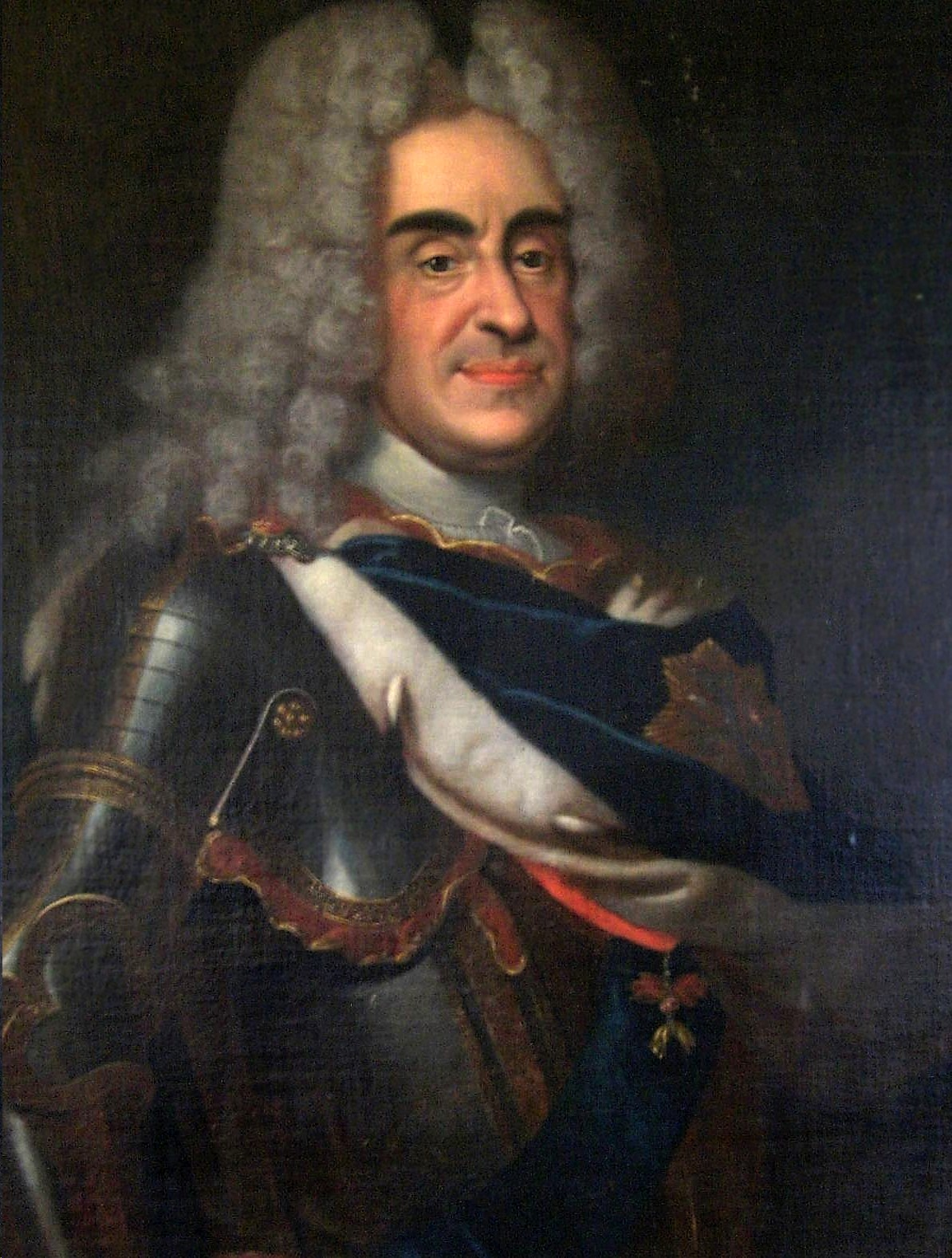
Augustus II the Strong

Augustus II stationed the powerful Saxon army within the Commonwealth and applied various external pressures in order to alter its political system, which only alienated the Polish nobility and further demoralized the broader society, relegated to watching the corrupt, but unsuccessful at all levels establishment. The Commonwealth military lacked talented commanders and lost its will to fight for a cause, even though during the Northern War it could be up to 50,000 men strong (in addition to the Saxon army of 30,000). After 1717, the radically reduced Polish army had become a neglected rump of its former self. The Commonwealth diplomacy likewise fell into obscurity, in spite of the extensive resident European diplomatic service maintained by Augustus II and staffed mostly by Saxons. The Commonwealth had become a passive participant of European politics, which contrasted with the activist, but unconcerned in this respect Saxon court.

At the outset of his reign Augustus II arrived at an understanding with Frederick III, Elector of Brandenburg, which allowed the Hohenzollern ruler to take over Elbing (Elbląg) in 1698. The strong negative reaction in the Commonwealth provided one more opportunity for attacking the former Prussian vassal, which might have been Augustus' objective. But the matter was resolved through negotiations and Frederick's withdrawal from the city in 1700, only to be followed by partial reoccupation of the area in 1703.

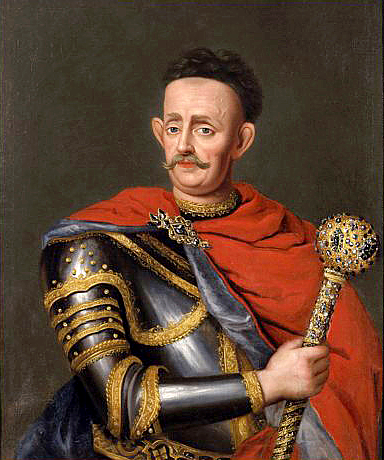
Kazimierz Jan Sapieha was defeated by Lithuanian rivals in 1700; his kin served Charles XII of Sweden in an attempt to regain influence

A treaty involving Saxony, Russia and Denmark, through which the signatories sought to recover territories previously appropriated by Sweden, was concluded in 1699 and became a prelude to the Great Northern War. The Danes were worried by the Swedish penetration of Holstein, peace with the Ottoman Empire allowed Peter I of Russia to direct his attention to the north, and Augustus II represented the Polish claim to Livonia, where his protection had been requested by Johann Patkul, a representative of the Livonian nobility.

The hostilities were initiated early in 1700, when the Danes attacked Holstein and Augustus tried to take over Riga by a sudden action. But the Swedish army was prepared and under the exceptional command of Charles XII, a guarantor of Holstein independency along with England and the Netherlands, who soon forced Denmark to accept peace and routed Peter I's larger force at the Battle of Narva. Augustus II, unable to take Riga even after a long siege, wanted to pull out of the war. For Sweden however the union of Saxony and the Commonwealth seemed a strategic and economic threat and Charles demanded that Augustus relinquishes the Polish throne as the condition for peace. The Swedish monarch expected considerable support within the Commonwealth, where in Lithuania the powerful and abusive Sapieha magnate faction was defeated in a civil war (Battle of Valkininkai (Olkieniki) in November 1700) and the oligarchs appealed to Charles for protection and the removal of Augustus.

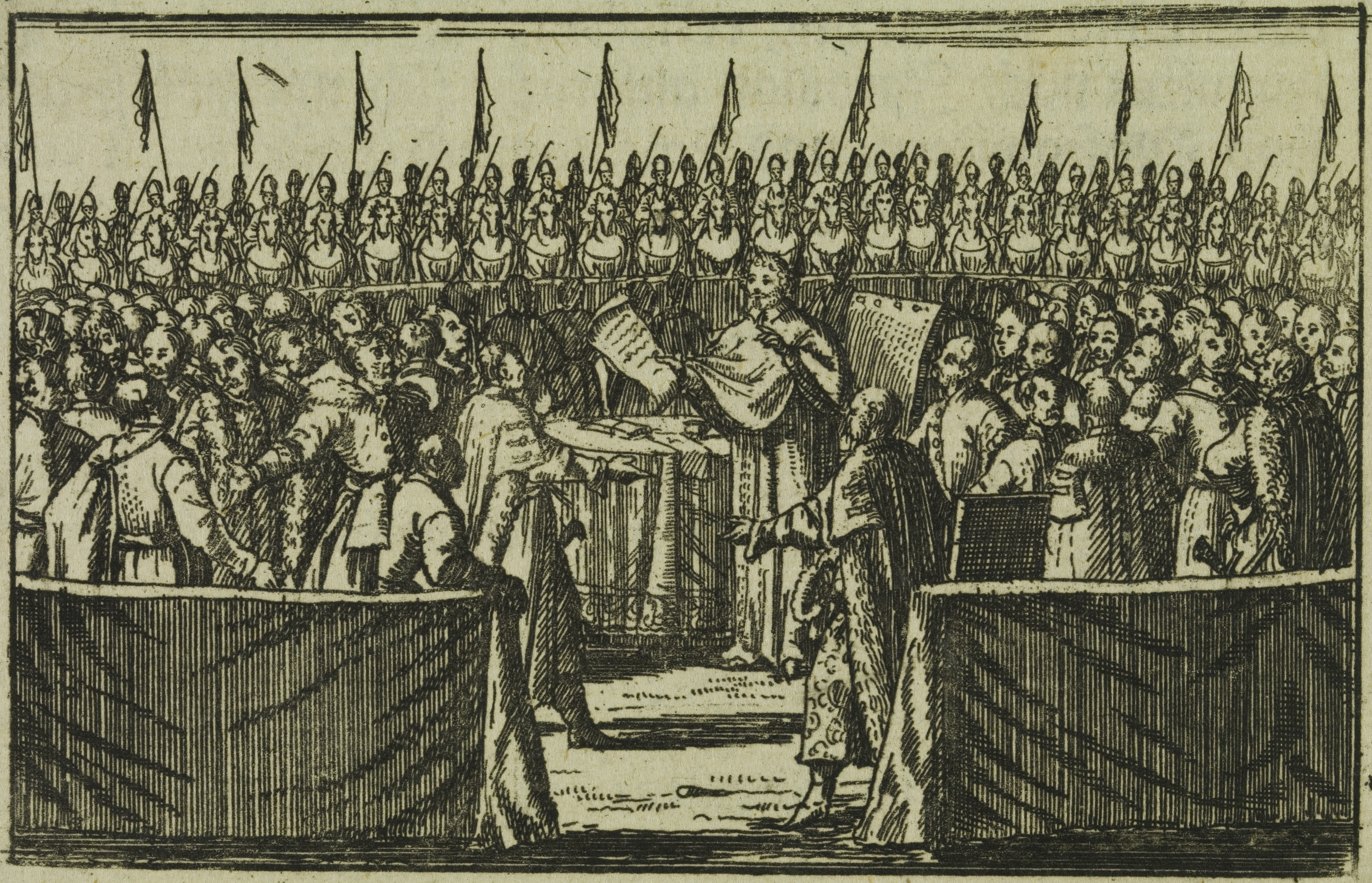
Leszczyński's first "election" (1704) was enforced by the Swedish troops present

Charles defeated the Saxon army at a battle near Riga in 1701, took over Courland and entered the Commonwealth, at that time not an official participant of the war. The Swedes took Warsaw and moved toward Kraków, which also fell as the Saxon and Polish forces were beaten at Kliszów in July 1702. Further Saxon defeats took place the following year at Pułtusk and Thorn (Toruń), which split the Commonwealth nobility and intensified the anti-Saxon opposition led by Cardinal Radziejowski. A confederation in Warsaw, based mainly on Greater Poland nobility, was convened, and, following the wishes of Charles XII, proclaimed a dethronement of Augustus on Feb. 14, 1704. On July 12, the election as king of Stanisław Leszczyński, the Voivode of Poznań, took place. It was the first free election in which the outcome was imposed by a foreign ruler, and the chosen, young and well-educated Polish magnate, was completely subservient to Charles. Stanisław's elevation was followed by a country-wide civil war and by the Treaty of Warsaw (1705), aimed at subjugating the Commonwealth to Swedish dominance. The Swedish monarch was granted permanent extensive territorial and other concessions, such as the right to station and conscript troops, and intended to use the Commonwealth's resources to fight Russia, his main adversary.

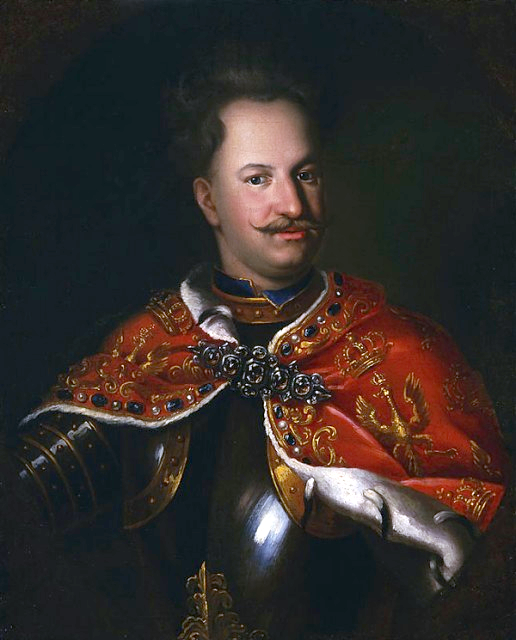
Stanisław Leszczyński

The majority of the Polish nobility opposed the Warsaw Confederation and considered Leszczyński's election illegal. The predominant pro-Augustus party convened the Sandomierz Confederation in May 1704 under Stanisław Denhoff as marshal, declaring their intent to defend the King and the integrity of the state and seeking the Tsardom's protection. Accordingly, the Treaty of Narva was concluded on August 30, 1704 in the recently won by the Russians Narva, with the purpose of facilitating a common front against Sweden, giving Russia the right to fight Swedish armies on the Commonwealth's territory. The Commonwealth was promised a (never realized) recovery of Livonia and the Tsardom obliged itself to help in suppressing the Cossack uprising of Semen Paliy in the right-bank Ukraine, but the treaty opened opportunities for Russia's future involvement in the affairs of the Commonwealth.

The developments on the military front did not however proceed as hoped for by the pro-Saxon majority. The common Russian-Saxon-Polish offensive had failed, as Charles forced the Russians to abandon Grodno and the Saxon-led coalition army was defeated in 1706 at the Battle of Fraustadt. As a result of the favorable for him outcomes at the War of the Spanish Succession, Charles XII was able to enter the Holy Roman Empire and occupied Saxony. Augustus II had to agree to humiliating terms of the Treaty of Altranstädt of 1706, in which he renounced the Polish crown.

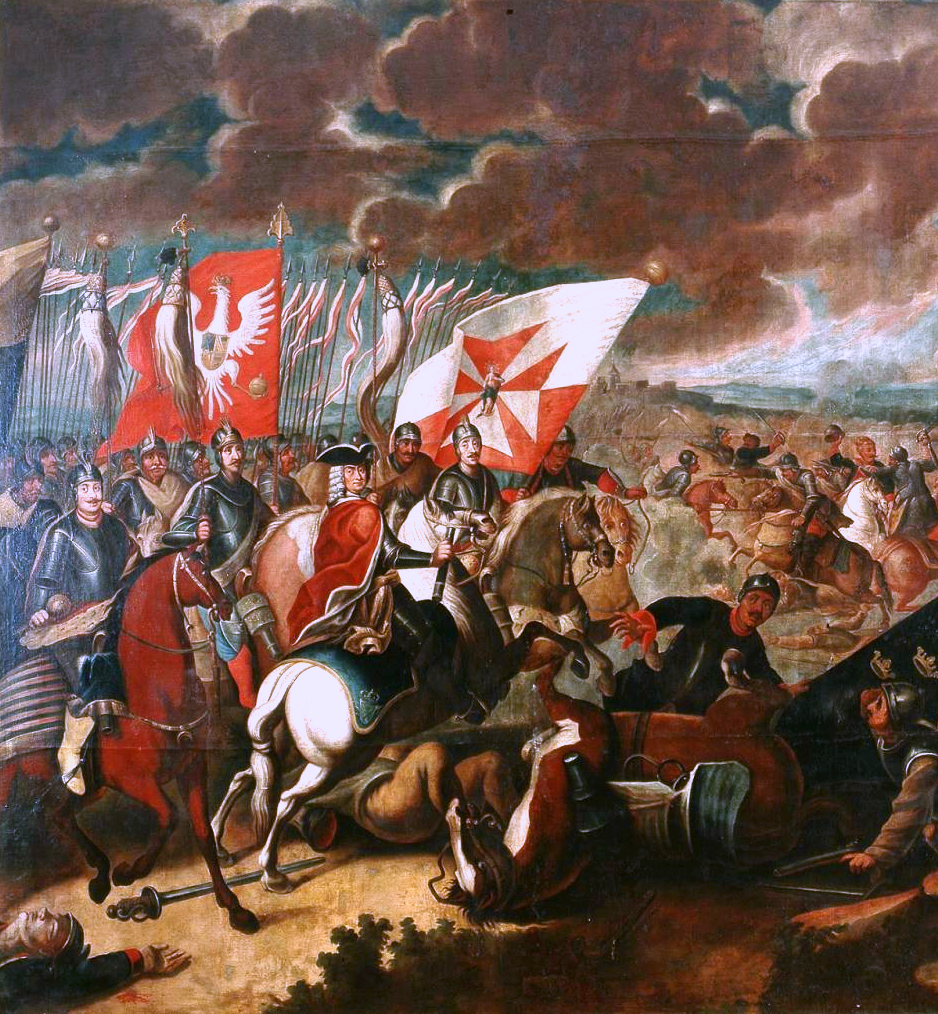
Battle of Kalisz 1706

Prior to the treaty ratification, Augustus still managed to defeat at Kalisz a combined Swedish and Warsaw Confederation force, which left most of the Commonwealth clear of the Swedish occupiers, until Charles entered through Silesia again. The Sandomierz Confederation held to their alliance with Peter the Great of Russia also during the Charles' Moscow offensive, when the Russian troops left Poland. Stanisław Leszczyński's forces, charged with protecting the rear end, were defeated by his and Charles' Polish adversaries at the Battle of Koniecpol. Stanisław and von Krassow (commander of the Swedish units left in Poland), thwarted by the Sandomierz confederates again, were unable to break through to join Charles who was stuck in Ukraine, where the Cossack hetman Ivan Mazepa largely failed to deliver on his promised support for the Swedes. The Swedish supply train approaching from Livonia was destroyed by the Russians, and thus the actions of the Sandomierz Confederation alliance significantly contributed to Charles' ultimate failure at the Battle of Poltava in 1709.

After Poltava von Krassow and his forces withdrew to Swedish Pomerania and the rule of Augustus II was restored, as Leszczyński sought refuge in Swedish-controlled Stettin. Charles XII found his in Bender, under the Ottoman rule, and was still a cause of unrest in the Commonwealth. The Russo-Turkish War (1710–1713), instigated by Charles, ended in the defeat of Tsar Peter, who was obliged to remove his forces from the Commonwealth. Augustus' expeditions into Western Pomerania in 1711–13 with the Danes and Russians resulted only in the Prussian takeover of Stettin.

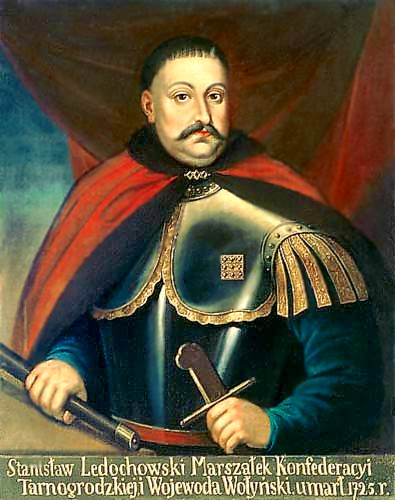
Stanisław Ledóchowski was the influential marshal of the Tarnogród Confederation and of the Silent Sejm

Under the circumstances Augustus wanted to terminate his participation in the war and free himself from his dependence on Peter I, previously formalized under the Treaty of Thorn of 1709, but achieved only a partial success. Attempts at peace with Sweden, which would strengthen Augustus' hand in dealing with Peter, turned also elusive, as Charles XII kept making excessive demands, including high reparations for Leszczyński. Resumption of hostilities necessarily followed, because Charles, having returned from his exile, embarked on building of an army in Stralsund, threatening Saxony and Poland. A siege of Stralsund (1711–1715), undertaken jointly by the forces of Saxony, Prussia and Denmark, ended in its capture and basically concluded the Saxon participation in the war. Saxony-Commonwealth ended up as the only power in the victorious coalition with no territorial gains.

The activities of Augustus II were aimed at strengthening his royal power in the Commonwealth. Nobility's opposition to the stationing of Saxon troops in Poland, its cost and internally threatening role, led to military resistance, first attempted in 1714 and then in a more definitive way pursued in 1715, when the action unified the pro-Swedish and pro-Russian camps and Peter I's support was secured. In the fall the Crown army became organized in an anti-Saxon capacity and fighting commenced, with large scale participation not only of szlachta, but also of the oppressed by military contributions peasants. In November, the Tarnogród Confederation, with Stanisław Ledóchowski as its marshal was formed, having the goal of removing the Saxons from the Commonwealth.

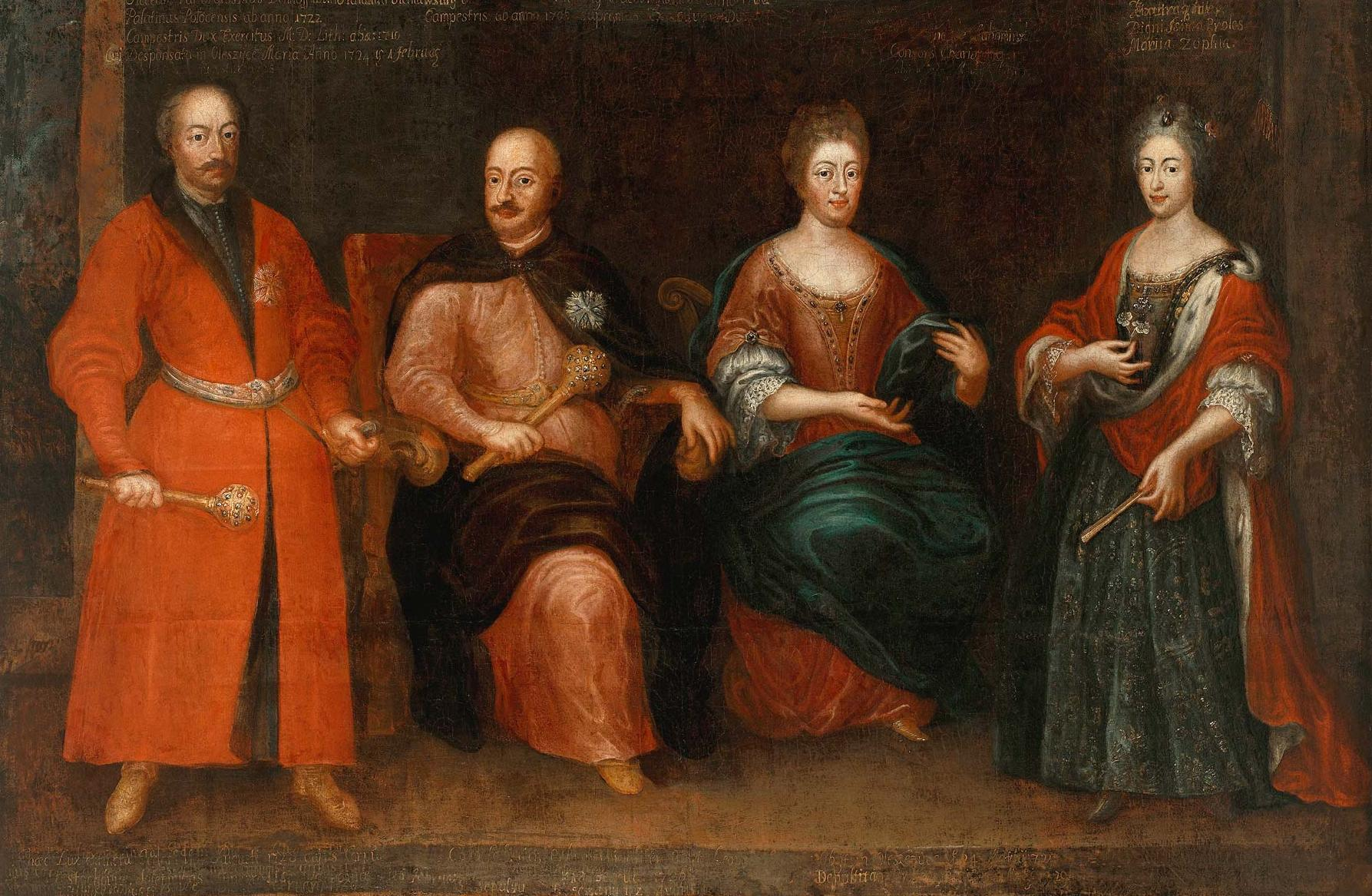
The Sieniawski family of Polish nobles; Stanisław Ernest Denhoff first, Elżbieta Sieniawska née Lubomirska third from the left

The spreading movement, unable to fulfill its mission alone, requested mediation by Peter I. Augustus agreed and several months of negotiations facilitated by the Russian ambassador followed, with the fighting still intermittently taking place. Eventually Augustus asked for an intervention by Russian forces, the confederates were defeated by the Saxons at the Battle of Kowalewo, and on November 3, 1716 a treaty between the King and the Polish nobility was signed in Warsaw. The treaty was ratified by the one-day Silent Sejm of Feb. 1, 1717, so called because no debate was allowed. The outcome was a compromise arrived by the negotiating representatives of the King and of the Tarnogród Confederation, but the Tsardom's mediation and supervision marked a turning point in the Polish-Russian relations.

The Treaty of Warsaw and the Silent Sejm settled numerous contentious issues and resulted in limited reform of the state, encompassing a part of what was demanded by the more enlightened szlachta political publicists (Stanisław Szczuka, Stanisław Dunin-Karwicki). Poland-Saxony relationship was strictly limited to a personal union. Saxon ministers were barred from ruling on matters concerning the Polish–Lithuanian Commonwealth. The King was to be able to keep only 1200 personal guard Saxon soldiers and was not allowed to reside in Saxony for prolonged periods.

The Commonwealth military force was practically limited to 18,000 soldiers, but was secured by permanent taxing arrangements. The state budget, while enlarged, was set at only a fraction of that of Russia or Prussia. Hetman level chief military commanders had their privileges reduced. Limitations were also imposed on legal competence of regional sejmik assemblies, which turned out to be difficult to implement because of continuous inadequacy of central sejm.

The reversals suffered by Poland and Saxony in the course of the Great Northern War reflected a new configuration of forces in Europe and were of lasting nature, of which the contemporaries were not immediately aware. Charles VI, Holy Roman Emperor and George I of Great Britain worked out an alliance with Augustus II in Vienna in 1719, aimed at checking the expansion of imperial Russia, but requiring participation of the Commonwealth. Peter I, however, cooperated with the Commonwealth by withdrawing his forces that same year and accordingly the Sejm would not ratify the treaty. Augustus was still able to largely free himself from Peter's protectorate, but in return was excluded from the Treaty of Nystad negotiations, which concluded the war in 1721. Russia took Livonia and the Commonwealth no longer shared a border with Sweden. In real terms, Poland, besides Sweden, was the main victim of the war, because of the damage inflicted on its population, economy, degree of independence, ability to function politically and potential for self-defense.

=== Later Wettin rule, Polish Succession War, magnate factions ===
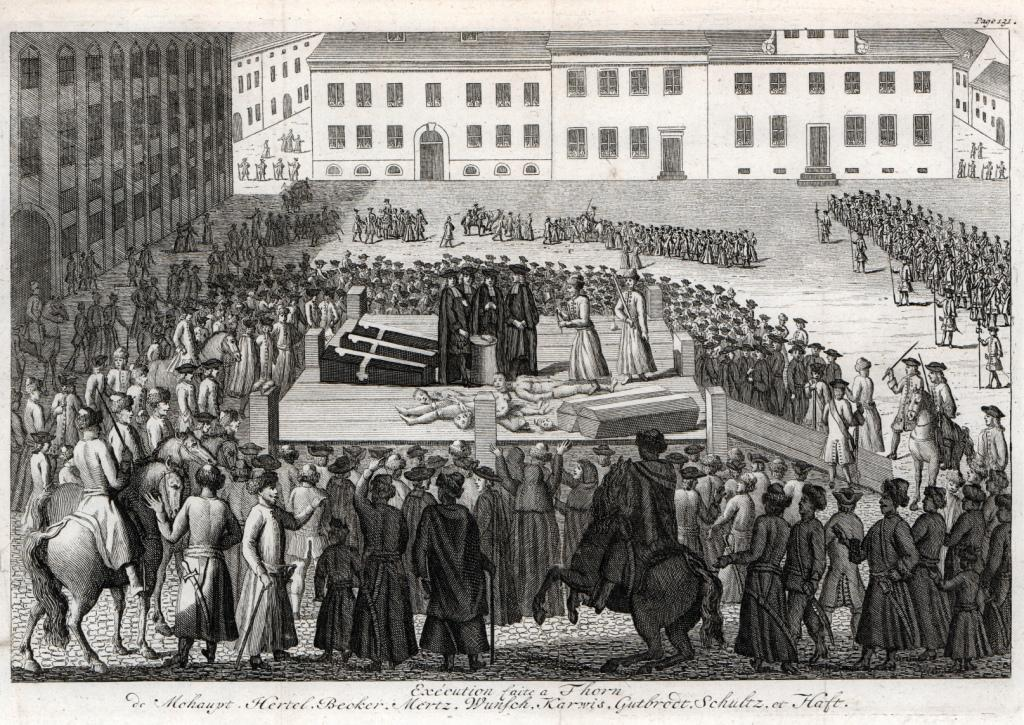
Lutherans executed in Thorn in 1724

The last fifteen years of the rule of Augustus II the Strong was characterized by the continuation of magnate factions' private pursuits, but also by the arrival of long-awaited peace and the formation of the Commonwealth's reformist camp. Augustus II, after 1717 having his most ambitious or extreme undertakings curtailed, concentrated on ensuring the Polish succession for his son Friedrich August, which was opposed both domestically and by foreign powers. Augustus was seeking the support of Austria and had imperial political ambitions. Son Frederick Augustus converted to Catholicism and in 1719 married Maria Josepha, daughter of Emperor Joseph I.

In the Commonwealth Augustus was frustrated by the dogged opposition of the Crown Hetman Adam Sieniawski and Lithuanian Hetman Ludwik Pociej, who fought the royal court, themselves protected by Tsar Peter. They broke successive parliamentary sessions and by 1724 forced the King to remove his trusted minister, Jacob Heinrich von Flemming, from the command of a key military formation.

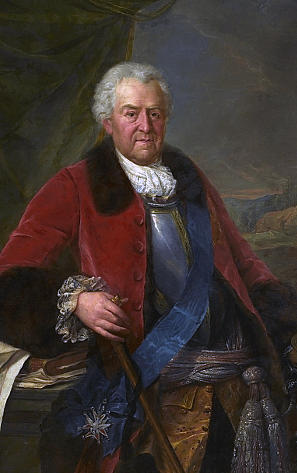
Stanisław Poniatowski married Konstancja Czartoryska; they were the parents of Stanisław Antoni Poniatowski, future king

At this point Augustus was able to use the Tumult of Thorn (Toruń) to his political advantage. The tumult was a religious disturbance and confrontation involving Catholics and Protestants (Lutherans), followed by a verdict of the state court, which sentenced ten Protestants to death. The affair reflected general deterioration of religious tolerance in the Commonwealth, was widely condemned abroad and only the death of Peter I prevented a foreign military intervention prepared in response, with the participation of Frederick William I of Prussia. Augustus refused to intercede on behalf of the condemned and his standing among the unrepentant and unyielding szlachta improved. Subsequent efforts to normalize Poland's foreign relations came to an end when the Commonwealth became engulfed in factional fighting, of which the two recently formed great rival magnate camps, led respectively by the Czartoryski family and the Potocki family, were the main participants.

The party of the newly-prominent Czartoryskis, known as the Familia, expressed patriotic concerns, displayed political activism, was of modern outlook and was connected to Augustus II. Its powerful members included August Aleksander Czartoryski, Fryderyk Michał Czartoryski and Stanisław Poniatowski, a highly accomplished general and diplomat, formerly in the service of Charles XII of Sweden.

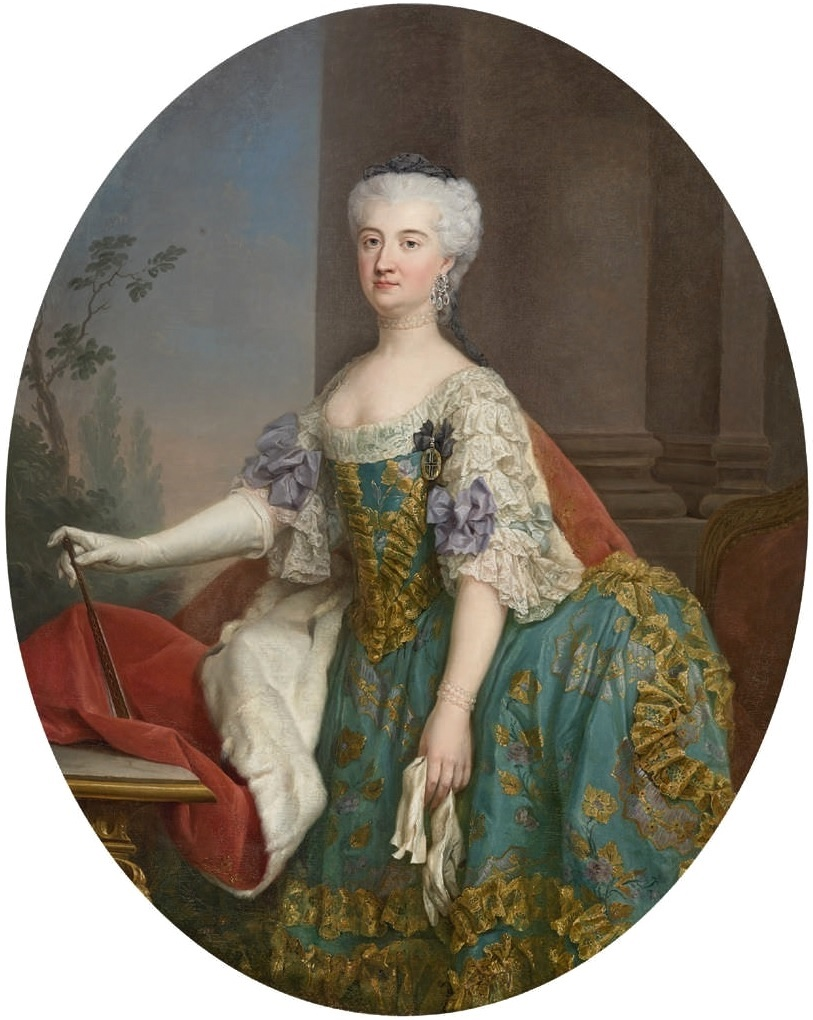
Konstancja Czartoryska

The Potockis camp attempted to counteract the rise of the Familia and united the majority of historically most outstanding families, including the Lithuanian clans of the Radziwiłłs, Sapiehas and Ogińskis; among their leaders were Józef Potocki and Teodor Andrzej Potocki, the Primate. The partisan, ruthless competition for top offices prevented central parliamentary function toward the end of the rule of Augustus II. Stanisław Konarski, a prominent pioneering reformer, condemned the breaking of the Sejm proceedings and defended the Familia's point of view in his debut as a publicist in 1732 (Conversation of a Country Gentleman with His Neighbor).

Augustus II counted on the Familia's support regarding the Polish succession of his son Frederick Augustus, but as Louis XV of France married Marie Leszczyńska, the chances of her father, the former king of short duration Stanisław Leszczyński, kept increasing, until he gained the support of both magnate camps and of much of szlachta's rank and file. But the powers which surrounded the Commonwealth opposed both candidacies. In order to control the situation within their weak Polish neighbor they concluded several pacts, beginning in 1720 in Potsdam between Russia and Prussia, which culminated with the Treaty of the Three Black Eagles of 1732. This treaty involved also Austria and designated Infante Manuel, Count of Ourém of Portugal to be the future king of Poland. Augustus II's last minute desperate machinations and schemes were interrupted by his death on February 1, 1733.

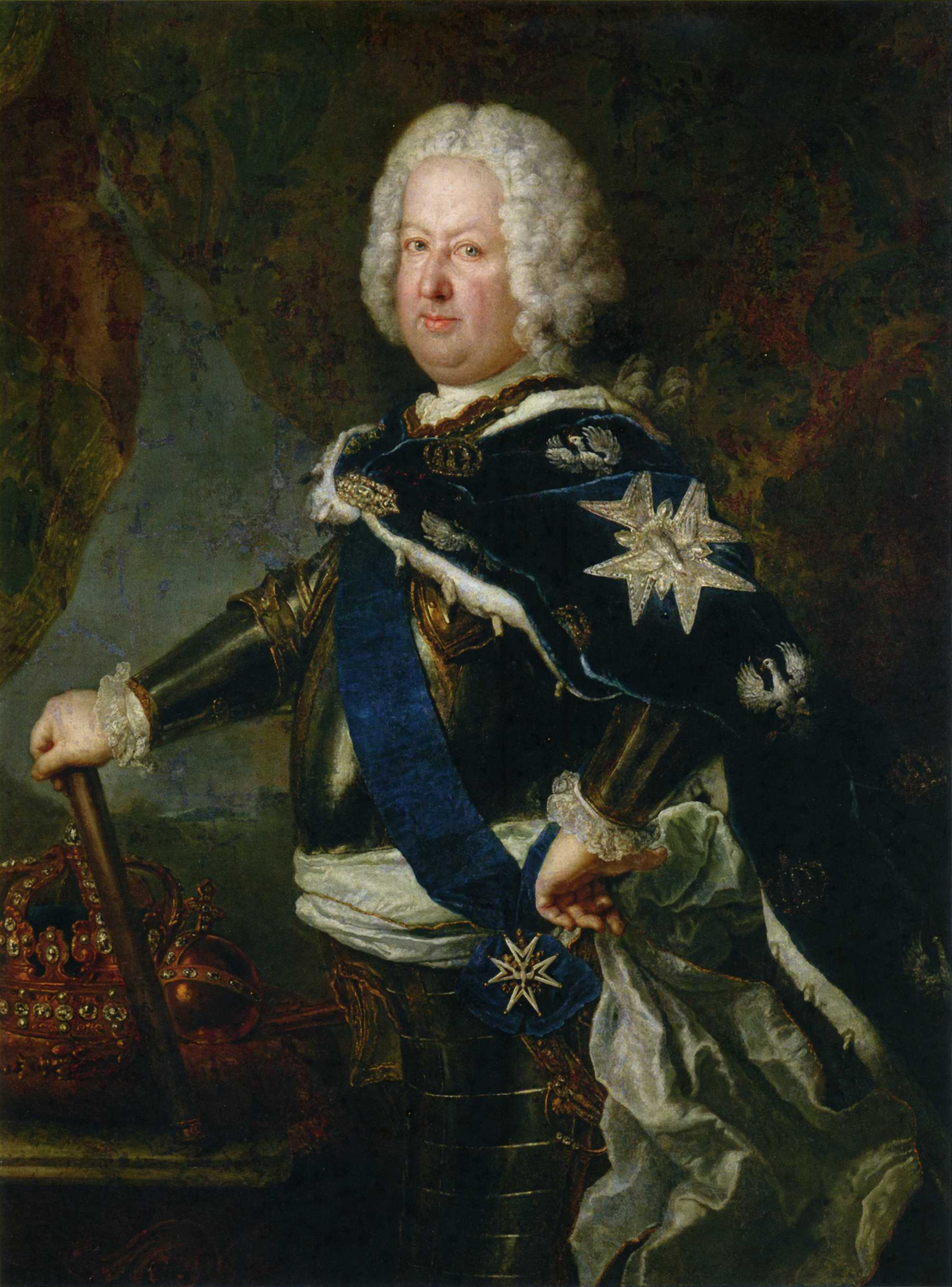
Stanisław Leszczyński had his second chance as a king

A large majority of the Polish nobility, in a rare show of unity, elected Leszczyński on September 12, 1733. The former king however lacked strong support even from France and had to sneak into Warsaw in disguise.

The Saxon court in the meantime was able to arrive at an understanding with St. Petersburg and Vienna, and through the concessions extended, including giving up Courland for Ernst Johann von Biron, a favorite of Tsaritsa Anna of Russia, secured their support in the secret Löwenwolde Treaty. Willing Polish nobles were found, Russian soldiers were brought in and the Wettin was "elected" as Augustus III on October 5. The crown of the Commonwealth, in dispute again, was to be decided through the force of arms.

Frederick Augustus' army entered the Commonwealth and took Kraków, where his crowning took place in January 1734. Stanisław Leszczyński went to Danzig, where he waited in vain for serious help from France. The city itself supported him, and surrounded by the Russian and Saxon forces, put up a brave defense for four months, but when the attempted rescue by the Crown army was thwarted by the Russians, Danzig had to surrender on May 29, 1734.

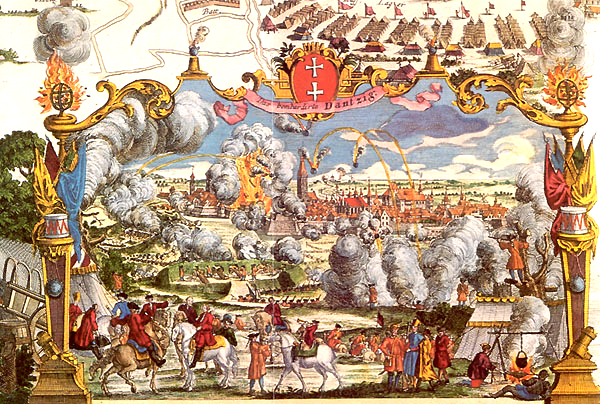
Siege of Danzig (1734)

Leszczyński's supporters captured there were forced to recognize Augustus, while the King himself escaped and found refuge in Prussia under the protection of Frederick William. From Königsberg Stanisław issued a manifesto in November 1734, in response to which the Dzików Confederation was set up near Tarnobrzeg, under Adam Tarło as its marshal. The confederates mustered up armed resistance, dedicated to the defense of the Commonwealth's integrity and independence, but the forces of Russia and Saxony encountered no great difficulty in eliminating their units.

France, victorious over Austria in the West, lost its (never very strong) interest in supporting Stanisław Leszczyński and signed an armistice in Vienna in 1735, which became a peace treaty there in 1738. Leszczyński had to relinquish the Polish crown and was compensated with the Duchy of Lorraine, as his fief for life.

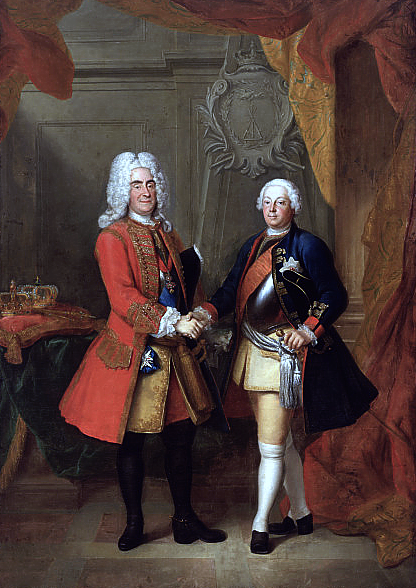
Augustus II with Frederick William I of Prussia, who aspired to protect the Protestants of the Commonwealth

In the Commonwealth the situation stabilized with the Pacification Sejm of 1736, which finally assigned top state offices, to Józef Potocki (the Crown Hetman) and the main electors of Augustus. The foreign forces left the Commonwealth, but its sovereignty remained badly compromised and the Polish nobility in reality had lost its most cherished privilege, the free election of the country's monarchs.

Augustus III's deteriorating health caused him eventually to give up and transfer political activity to his powerful courtiers, including Minister Heinrich von Brühl and Marshal Jerzy Mniszech. After 1754 Augustus' court supported reformist activities of the Familia, still involved in the infighting of the magnate parties. Saxon defeats in the Seven Years' War that followed caused complete political stagnation of the Dresden court and its Polish supporters camp.

The internal political fight was influenced by the early Enlightenment ideology and the awareness of the deteriorated condition of the Polish–Lithuanian state. The necessity of reforms, including urgent social issues such as economic and political empowerment of the urban classes and personal freedom for the peasantry, was being addressed in numerous written works. Stanisław Konarski embarked on an educational reform, Stanisław Poniatowski's publication (Letter of a Country Gentleman to a Certain Friend) expounded the comprehensive reform program of the Czartoryski party, including a promotion of mercantilism and economic development, before the sejm of 1744. Antoni Potocki of the competing camp likewise postulated fundamental internal reforms.

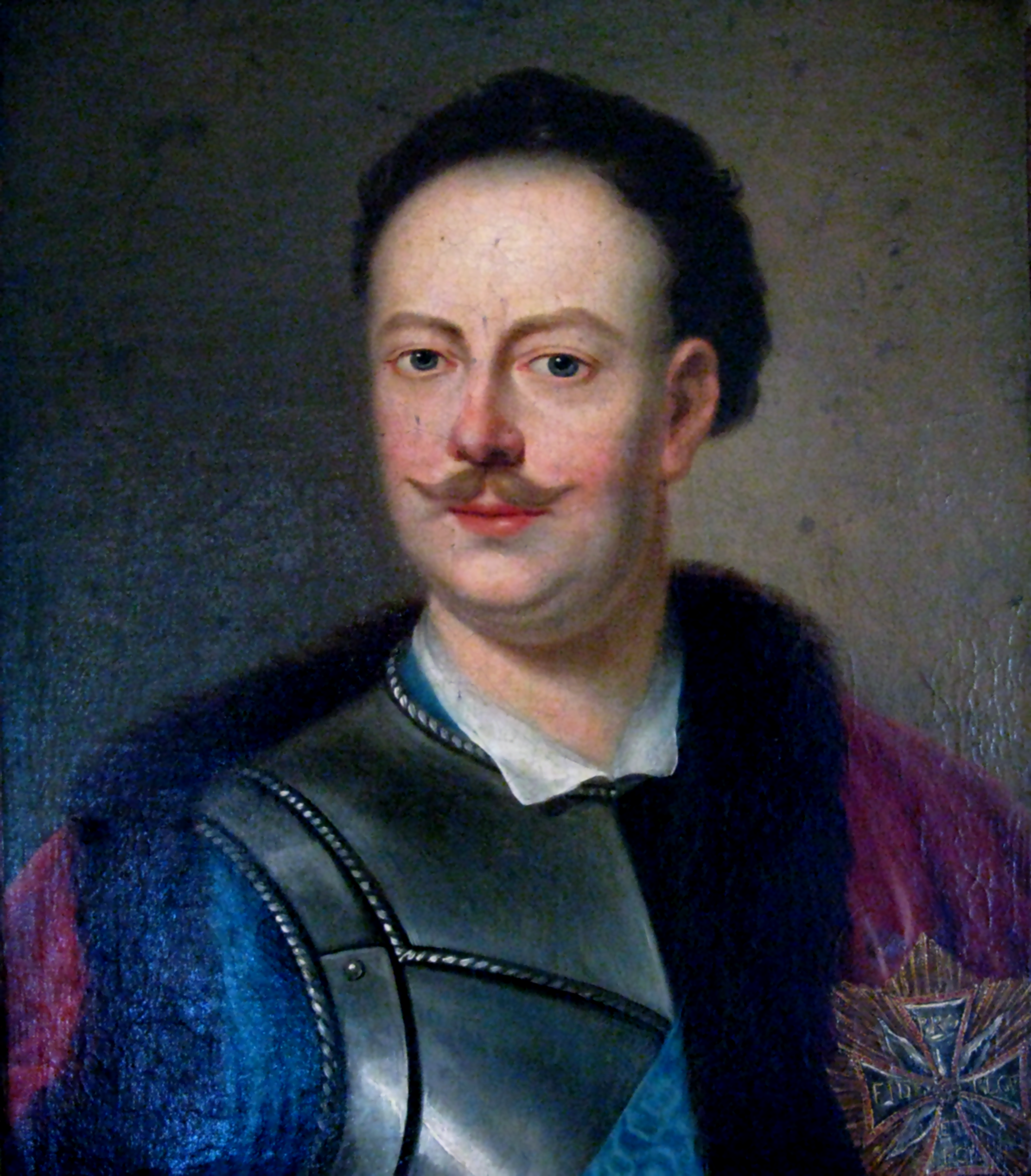
Jan Klemens Branicki succeeded Józef Potocki as Crown Hetman

The magnate factions utilized foreign help: The Potocki group was supported by Prussia of Frederick II, the Familia of the Czartoryskis perceived imperial Russia as the future ultimate arbiter of the Commonwealth's fate. Amidst the domestic bickering and foreign meddling, the indispensable treasury and military reforms had never materialized, despite several apparent opportunities and close calls, most notably at the sejm of 1744. From the 1750s and for the remainder of the reign of Augustus III, the Commonwealth descended into anarchy, corrupt private pursuits and unrestrained violation by foreign forces.

Significant rearrangements were taking place among the powers surrounding the Commonwealth. The now sovereign in the former Ducal Prussia Hohenzollern rulers consolidated their control of the Baltic coast areas also west of the Commonwealth's Royal Prussia and were seeking annexations of parts of Polish Pomerania, including a "Via Regia" connection between East Prussia and the western portions of the Kingdom of Prussia. While for the time being Russia prevented the realization of these plans, Frederick II directed his attention to the takeover of Silesia, a region which had been under the Bohemian and Austrian control for several centuries.

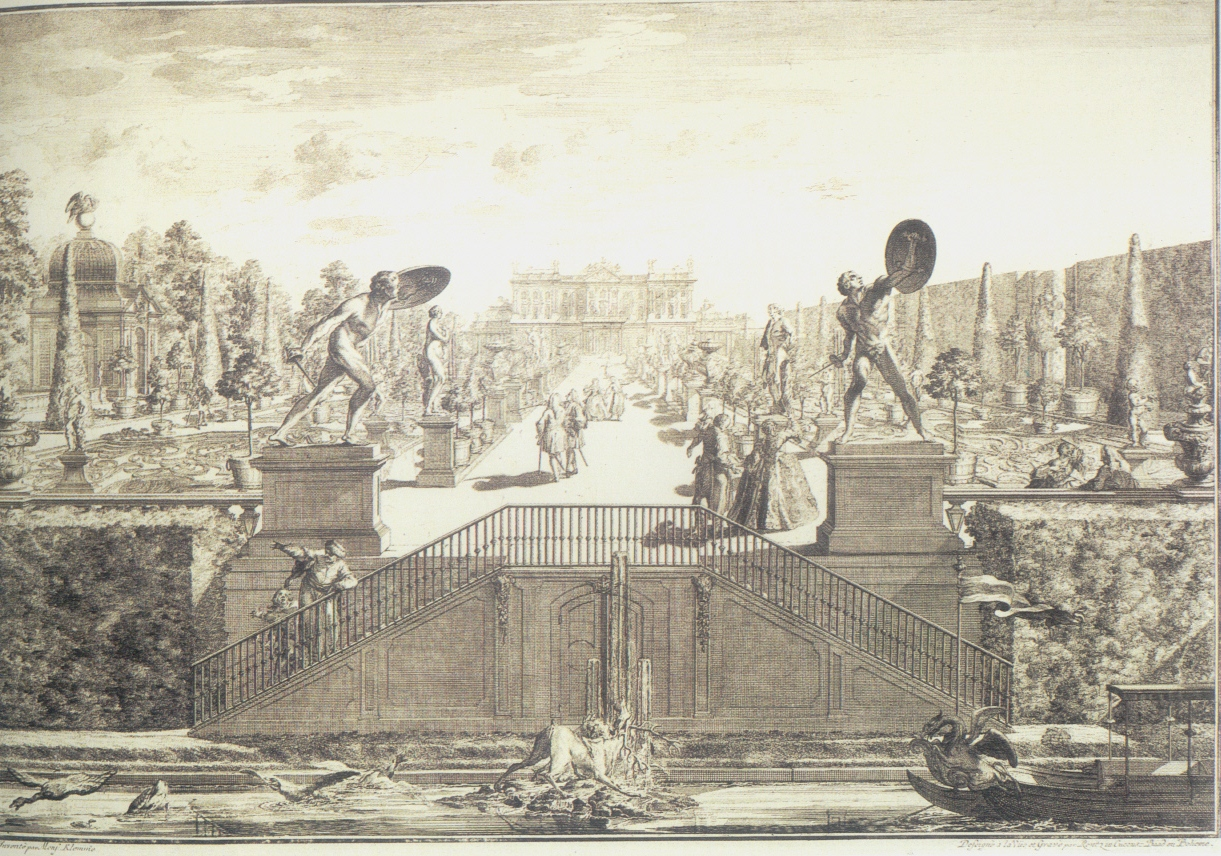
Branicki Palace gardens in Białystok

Taking advantage of the Habsburg dynastic crisis after the assumption of the throne by Maria Theresa, he invaded Silesia in 1740. The Austrians tried to recover the conquered area, but were defeated at the Battle of Mollwitz and then became preoccupied with the War of the Austrian Succession. The Treaty of Breslau and Treaty of Berlin (1742) gave Prussia the majority of the Silesian territory. Prussia became Poland's only western neighbor and the Prussian advances threatened the (thus far strong) ethnically Polish, often Protestant, Silesian populations with increased Germanization pressures. The Habsburg state had a much better record of tolerating minority cultures than the Hohenzollerns in East Prussia.

The first Silesian war was followed by the second (1744–45), terminated by the Treaty of Dresden, and the third (1756–63). Saxony participated in all three, hoping for a territorial connection with the Commonwealth. The Saxon army, allied with Prussia, was destroyed during Frederick's Olomouc campaign in 1742. For the second (when the Electorate was invaded by Prussia) and the third war Saxony switched to supporting the Habsburgs, seeking unsuccessfully to involve Poland during the sejm of 1744. The Treaty of Warsaw (1745) failed to substantially strengthen Augustus' position in the Commonwealth.

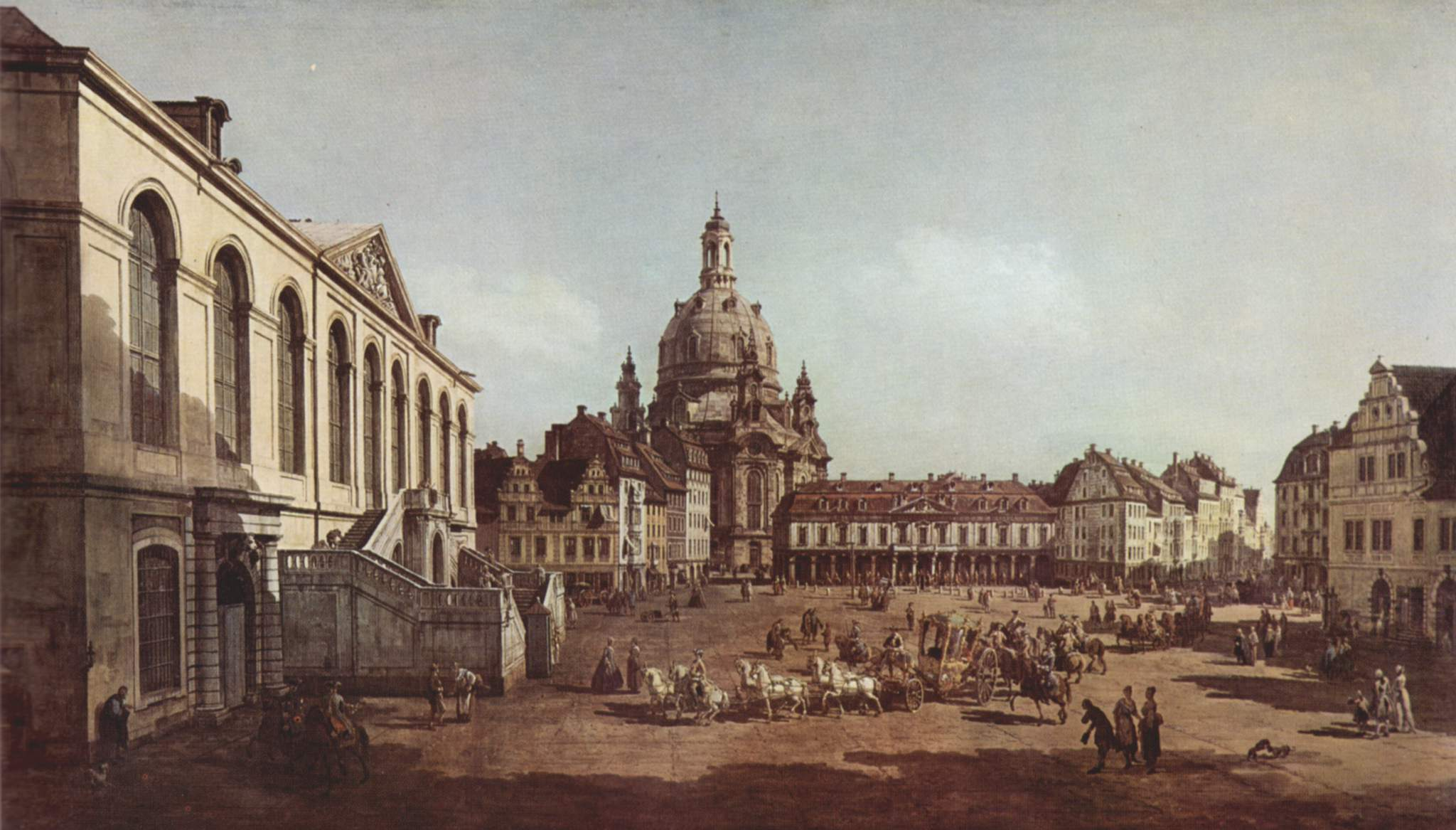
Dresden, the capital of Saxony, as seen by Bernardo Bellotto called Canaletto

The Seven Years' War brought a demise of the Saxon army, which attacked by the Prussians capitulated at Pirna in 1756; Saxony found itself under Prussian occupation. Despite the far reaching Prussian and Russian expansionist designs, the Treaty of Hubertusburg preserved the territorial status quo in the area in 1763. While the Saxon defeats precluded a continuation (beyond Augustus III) of the Wettin personal union with the Commonwealth, the disarmed and defenseless Rzeczpospolita was ripe for more definite territorial encroachments on the part of the neighboring powers.

The union with Saxony was of beneficial economic and cultural consequences for both participating societies. The Saxons were important in the dissemination of the early Enlightenment intellectual currents in the Commonwealth. Józef Aleksander Jabłonowski, the founder of a scientific society in Leipzig, was one of the Poles active in Saxony. The personal union times were to be remembered as a period of positive Polish-German interactions.

== Sarmatism era culture ==
=== Sarmatism and Counter-Reformation ===
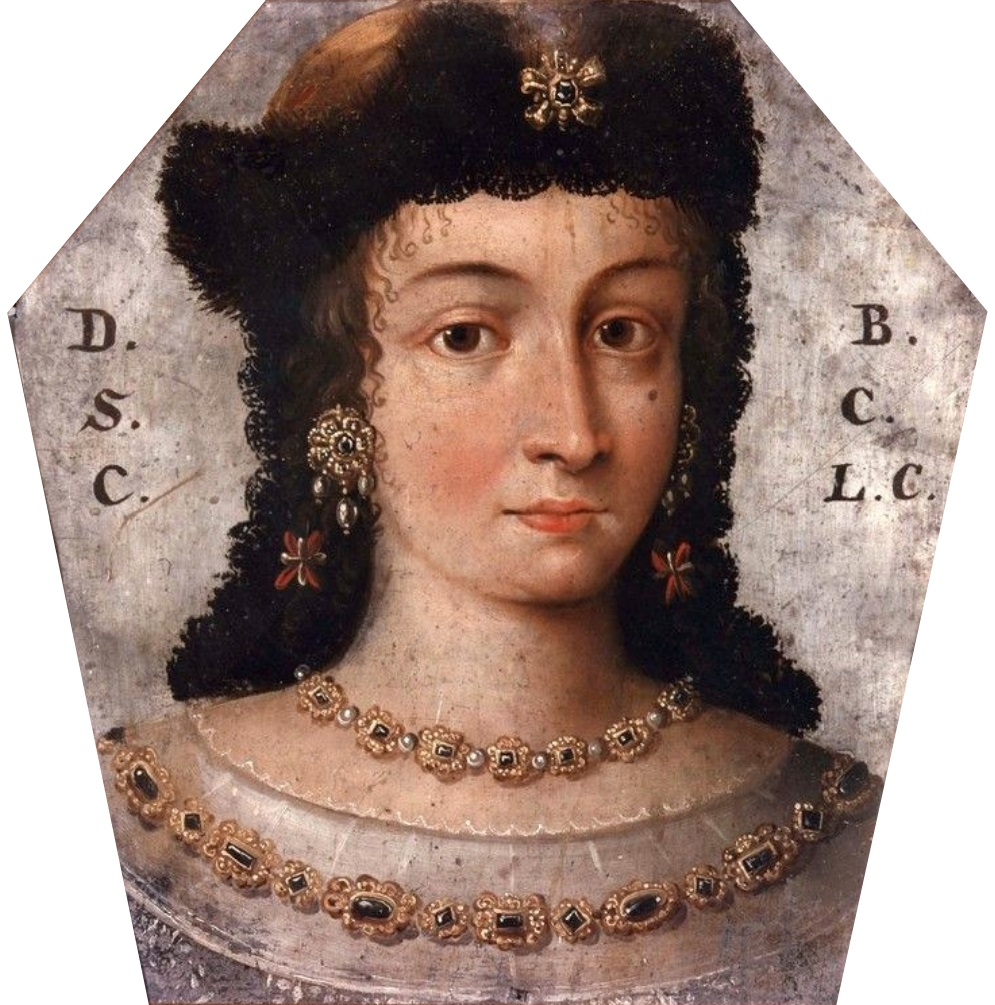
Coffin portrait of a noblewoman

In the realm of culture the 1648–1764 period was dominated by the style of Baroque, with the final decades constituting also the early Enlightenment. The middle of the 18th century was a period of transition between the two. Being a part of the nonhomogeneous European Baroque, the Commonwealth holds a unique, original position. West European elements were blended with Oriental influence and native styles and traditions, all fully combined within the broader regional Sarmatism culture.

Close cultural contacts with Italy, which originated during the Renaissance, had remained strong ever since. Numerous Italian artists worked in the Commonwealth, supported by the royal and magnate courts, while many among the Polish upper nobility traveled to Italy to study, participate in pilgrimages or for sightseeing, and increasingly also to France, to cultivate aristocratic contacts and familiarize themselves with the Western ways of life, at such major centers as Paris or Versailles.

Two traditions

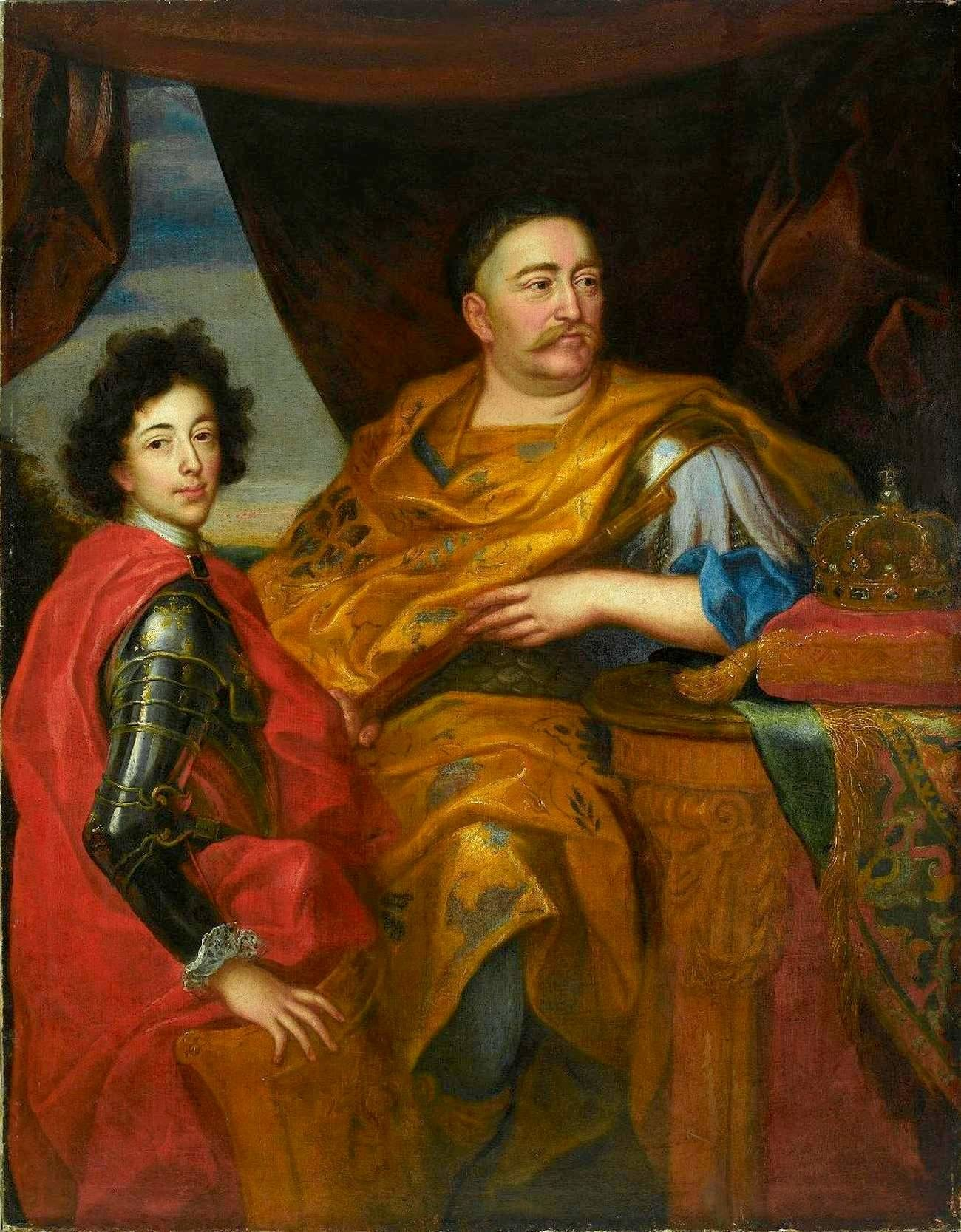
Western European tradition (Baroque art) – Portrait of John III Sobieski with his son Jakub Ludwik Sobieski in Roman costumes by Jan Tricius (Tretko).

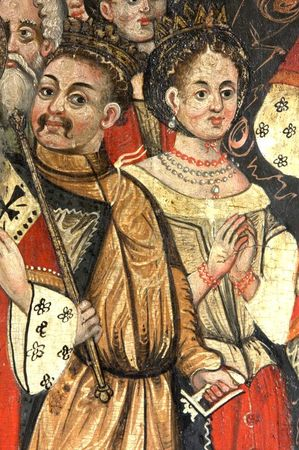
Eastern European tradition (Byzantine art) – Pokrov of Our Lady – detail with King John III Sobieski and Queen Marysieńka by unknown Ruthenian.

In the 18th century the growing French cultural influence had become dominant, which paralleled the rising political importance of France in Europe and the flowering of its arts and literature. The two queens who were French, Marie Louise and Marie Casimire, contributed greatly to cultural contacts and to the increasingly common family ties between the French and Polish aristocratic circles. The court of Augustus II, himself an admirer of the French and follower of Versailles patterns, strengthened the trend and the French language was by then in common use, but mostly within the magnate class.

German cultural patterns influenced strongly the German and Protestant burghers, especially in Royal Prussia and Poznań area, some of whom were educated at Protestant universities in Germany. The German culture became significant in the 18th century Commonwealth in the context of the personal union with Saxony. Less prevalent, but also present was the influence of other Protestant West European cultures, among which at the earlier stages the Dutch was more significant than English. Jewish burgher circles in the Commonwealth were important in trade and cultural contacts. Some Jews were educated abroad at the few European universities that accepted Jewish candidates.

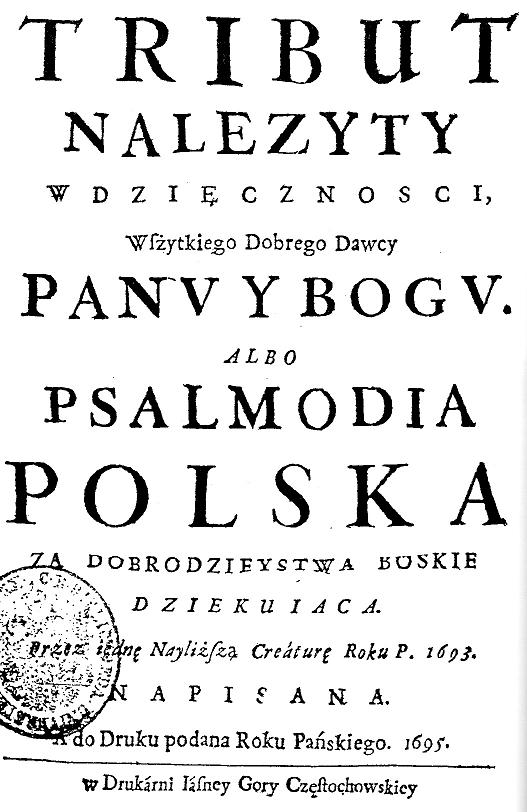
In Psalmodia polska Wespazjan Kochowski proclaimed the special mission of Poles as a chosen nation

The Eastern influences became clearly discernible and had been increasing throughout the 17th century. The nobility of the Commonwealth developed a preference for Tatar, Turkish, Persian and also East Slavic artistic tastes, which had to do with the wars fought on the Islamic front and the spoils brought back and with the presumed Black Sea shores (Sarmatian) origins of Polish nobles. Literary and linguistic interests were also pursued in that direction. Tadeusz Krusiński, a Jesuit missionary, traveled extensively and published in Latin, including a 1733 account of his experience in Persia.

From the early 17th century, the culture of Polish Baroque was ideologically based on Sarmatism and Counter-Reformation, which during that century were fused into one powerful current of Catholic national mission. The Polish, Lithuanian and Ruthenian nobilities were thus reduced to one messianic "nation" of common origin, whose calling was the defense of Christianity and freedom in Europe. This uniquely understood role of the "chosen" Polish nation was being promoted by the leading writers of the period, including Wacław Potocki and Wespazjan Kochowski, and was to remain a part of the national mystique for a long time. The practical byproducts of this supposedly civic-minded, self-elevating point of view were parochialism, xenophobia, stagnation and intolerance. The Polish Catholic Church had remained likewise nationalistic and intellectually backward until the 18th century, when the reforms of the Council of Trent were belatedly and gradually implemented. The enormous proliferation of monasteries of several orders had at that time little constructive influence on the nation's spiritual life or level of popular education. The witch trials and executions for example, although not as common as in Germany, had been a continuous practice until the middle of the 18th century.

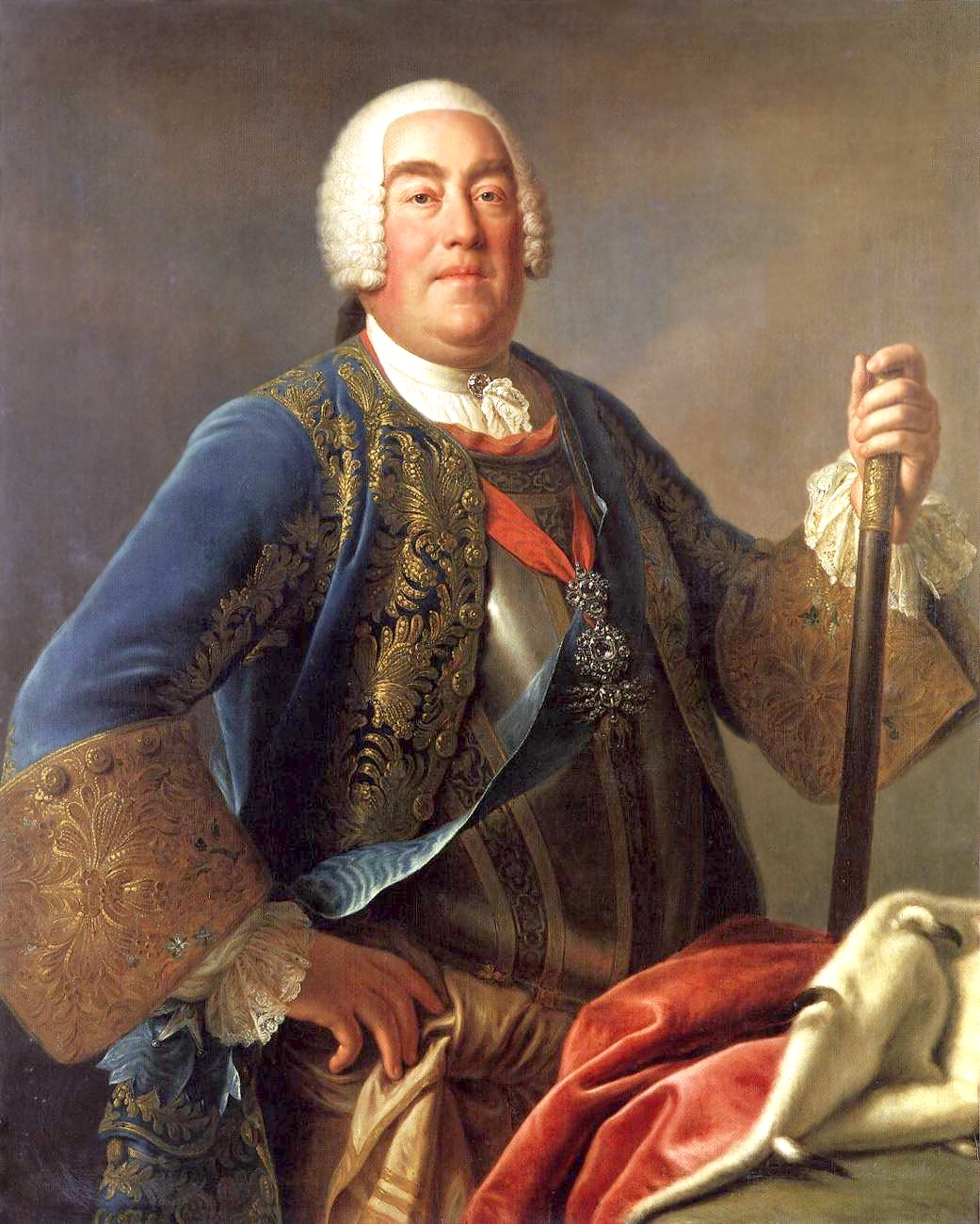
Augustus III

The Polish populace was by and large brought back into the fold of Catholicism during the first half of the 17th century, but anti-Protestant attacks continued. They most often took the form of written Catholic propaganda pamphlets and strict Church censorship of dissenting views. The one clear instance of active persecution undertaken against a religious minority was the expulsion of the Polish Brethren, who during the Swedish Deluge strongly supported King Charles X Gustav. The sejm of 1658 sentenced the so-called Arians to banishment, unless they convert to Catholicism. As a result, several hundred families (about five thousand people) left the Commonwealth in 1660, while others, threatened with capital punishment and confiscations, faked conversion, only to subject themselves to further statutory persecution. The Polish Brethren were among the most enlightened segments of the society and their expulsion had strong deleterious effects on the country's intellectual development. Other Protestant denominations remained, at least formally, protected by the rules of the 1573 Warsaw Confederation. Many Silesian Protestants entered the Commonwealth in order to avoid recatholization in the Holy Roman Empire after the Peace of Westphalia of 1648. Further restrictions however soon followed.

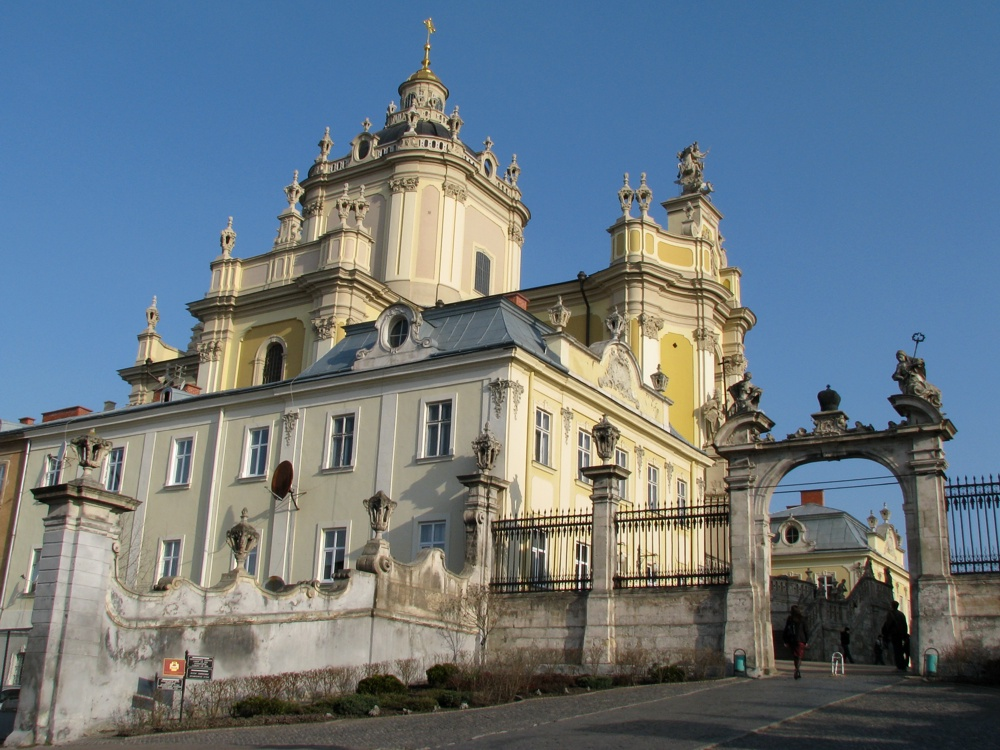
St. George's Cathedral of the Ukrainian Greek Catholic Church in Lviv

The "Arian registry", established after the sect's exodus, included in reality a variety of cases under religious persecution and prosecution, such atheism or apostasy, official separation from the Church. Apostasy was banned in 1668. From 1673 only Catholics could be granted nobility or indygenat, a recognition (transfer) of foreign nobility status. In 1717, after the Northern War destruction, Protestants were not allowed to restore the structures of their congregations or build new ones. They were banned from holding state offices and removed from central parliament. The discriminatory laws were all collected in the sejm statute of 1733, after which the Commonwealth Protestants no longer enjoyed meaningful political rights. Actual cases of religion-inspired violence, such as the Thorn Tumult of 1724, were rare and considerable freedom of religious practice had prevailed. Non-nobles attracted less scrutiny and many foreign persecuted minorities were allowed to settle in the country and keep their religion. The Orthodox Church hierarchy in the Commonwealth were all forced to accept the Union in the early 18th century.

The much-reduced Protestants remained significant. They cooperated among the several denominations and appealed to the Treaty of Oliva guarantees or to foreign (Prussian, English and Dutch) protection in case of imposed restrictions. The ethnically Polish and culturally active settlement concentrations that had remained in parts of Silesia, Pomerania and Prussia had the burgher Protestant class as their leading component.

=== Culture of Mature Baroque ===
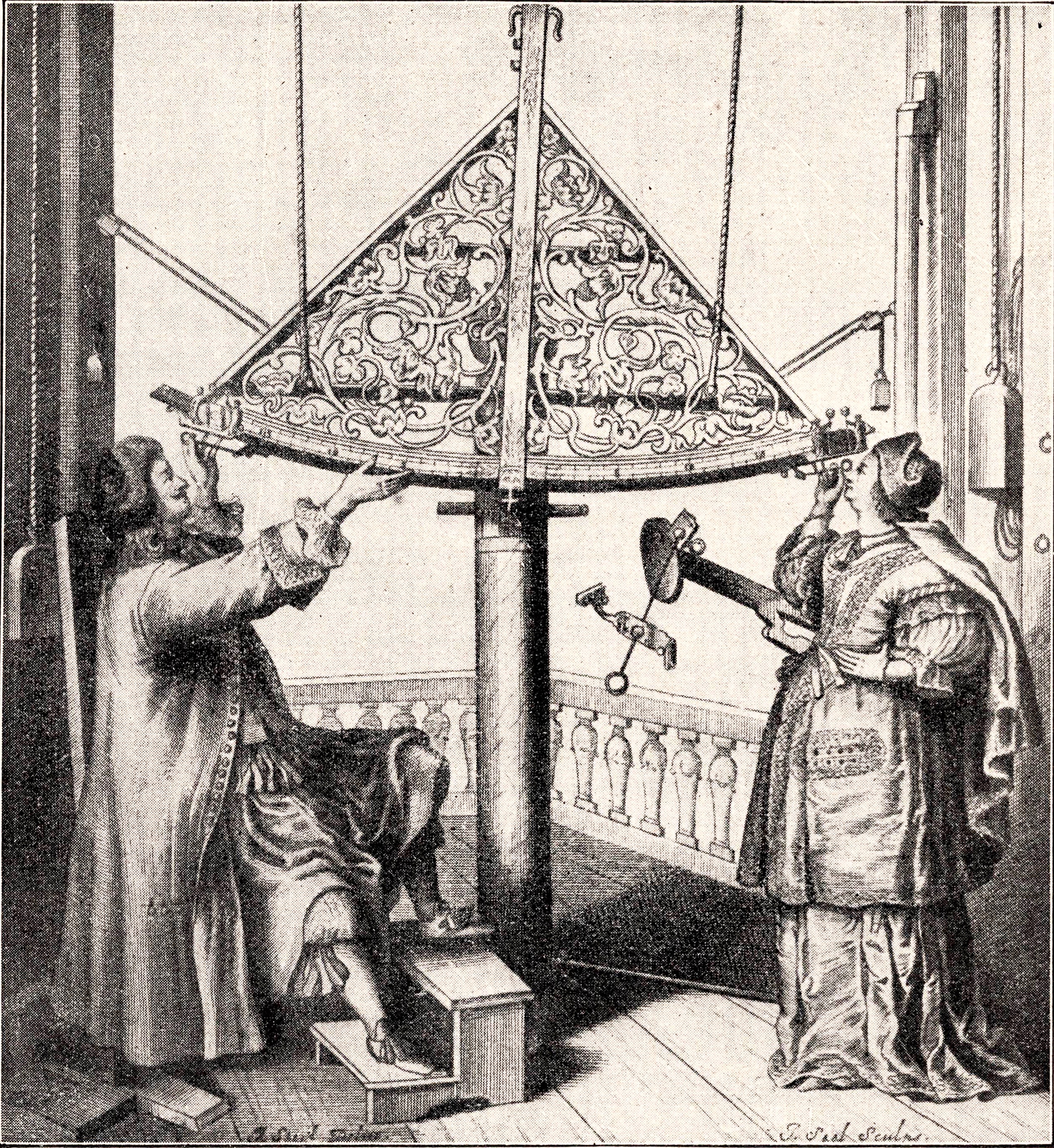
Johannes Hevelius and his wife Elisabeth making observations

The predominance of Sarmatism and Counter-Reformation and the weak cultural development of the Commonwealth were closely related to the lowered, in comparison with the previous period, level of general education. What was left of the school system, destroyed or damaged by wars and lack of interest, concentrated on religious education and cultivating the attachment to szlachta's "freedoms". The number of parish schools and secondary schools increased in the 18th century, with more serious reform commencing in the 1840s. Many secondary education colleges were conducted by religious orders of the Jesuits and Piarists. In the early 18th century the illiteracy levels may have ranged from about 28% of upper nobility, to 92% of petty nobility, with over 40% for middle nobility and burghers.

Protestant middle schools fared somewhat better, led by the well regarded gymnasiums in Danzig and Thorn. There were accomplished Polish Protestant schools in Silesia, led by the Pietist school in Teschen and the municipal school in Breslau.

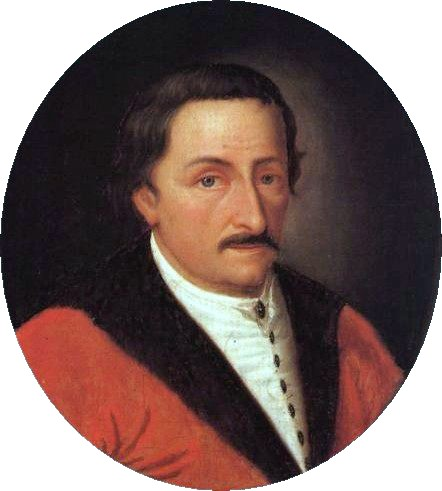
Andrzej Maksymilian Fredro

Higher education institutions remained stagnant for a prolonged period of time. Interested young members of the upper nobility or wealthy burghers went to study in Italy or other West European countries. The Jesuit Breslau Academy was established in 1702 and attracted students form the Commonwealth. The existing native institutions in Kraków, Vilnius, Zamość and Lwów taught mostly scholastic theology and philosophy.

Scientific achievements were accordingly generally modest. The one accomplished astronomer was Johannes Hevelius (1611–87) of Danzig, noted for the accurate observations of the sky with the equipment he constructed. Adam A. Kochański and Stanisław Solski were Jesuit mathematicians and astronomers; the latter one was also an engineer.

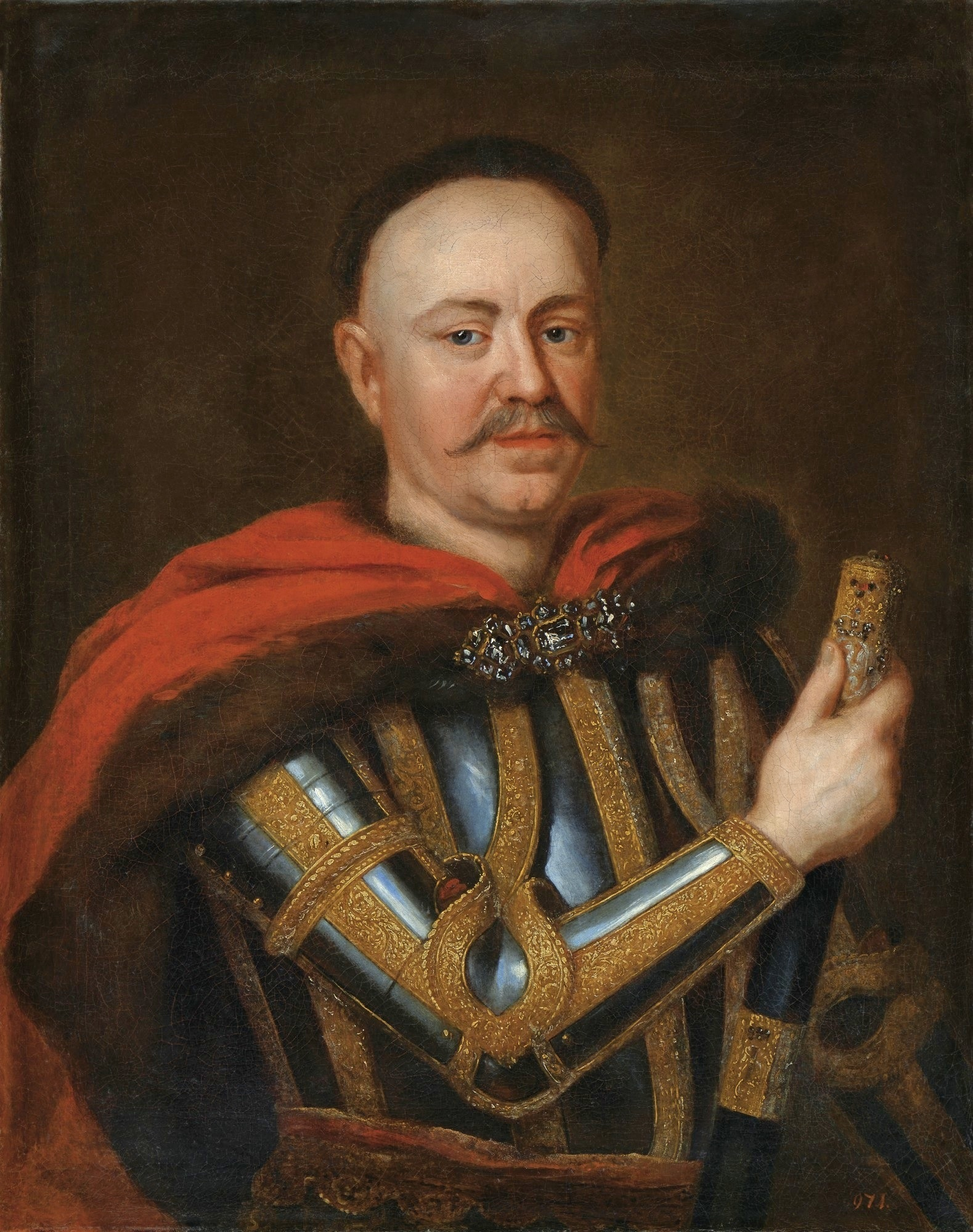
Stanisław Herakliusz Lubomirski

For history research the most important is the heraldry work The Polish Crown (1740) by Kasper Niesiecki, which provides a wealth of information on Polish szlachta clans.

Social and political thought produced little that was new. Its main representatives in the 17th century were Krzysztof Opaliński, Andrzej Maksymilian Fredro and Stanisław Herakliusz Lubomirski. They postulated limited social reform. In the early 18th century Stanisław Antoni Szczuka and Stanisław Dunin-Karwicki proposed legislative, treasury and military reforms.

Nowe Ateny (The New Athens), the first encyclopedia published by Benedykt Chmielowski in 1745–46, was not scientifically current. Of the popular agricultural handbooks the most complete was produced by Jakub Kazimierz Haur in 1675. Merkuriusz Polski Ordynaryjny of 1661, the first printed periodical, lasted for a year (41 issues). The first permanent newspaper was Kurier Polski, published from 1729 by the Piarists and then the Jesuits.

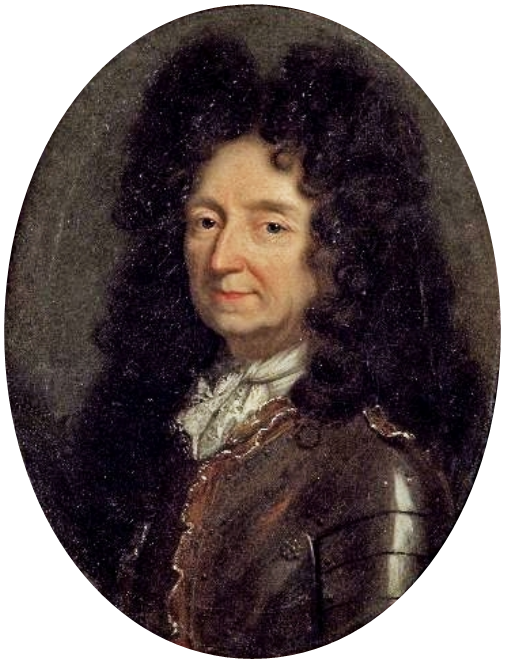
Jan Andrzej Morsztyn

The development of literature brought many new genres and themes, with the intended substance of a work often buried within heavy verbiage and other stylistic embellishments. There were hardly any authors ranking with Europe's best. The epic form was predominant, mainly as religious, but also historical or fantasy story telling, in both poetry and prose. The pastoral style was popular, for example in romance, as was lyric poetry in general. Preference was typically given to elaborate form. Publishing material that was original and creative was difficult, because of strict church censorship; many aspiring works had remained in manuscript form only.

Jan Andrzej Morsztyn, a magnate active in royal court circles, represented the conceptismo current. He wrote romantic poetry and expert translations of foreign work. Zbigniew Morsztyn was a soldier and poet connected with the Polish Brethren. He had to spend half of his life in exile in Prussia and produced realistic poetry concerned with the hardships and dangers of military life. Another poet and member of the Polish Brethren, Wacław Potocki, converted to Catholicism. His poetry depicts the life of Polish landed gentry and historic events. He wrote the epic poem The Conduct of the Khotyn War (of 1621) and was deeply troubled by the social injustice in the Commonwealth and its decline. The szlachta apologist Wespazjan Kochowski expressed no such misgivings, but even he could not conceal the progressive degeneration of his class. In the era of constant warfare the writing of memoirs had become an often practiced art. Jan Chryzostom Pasek was one of the leading in Europe representatives of this genre.

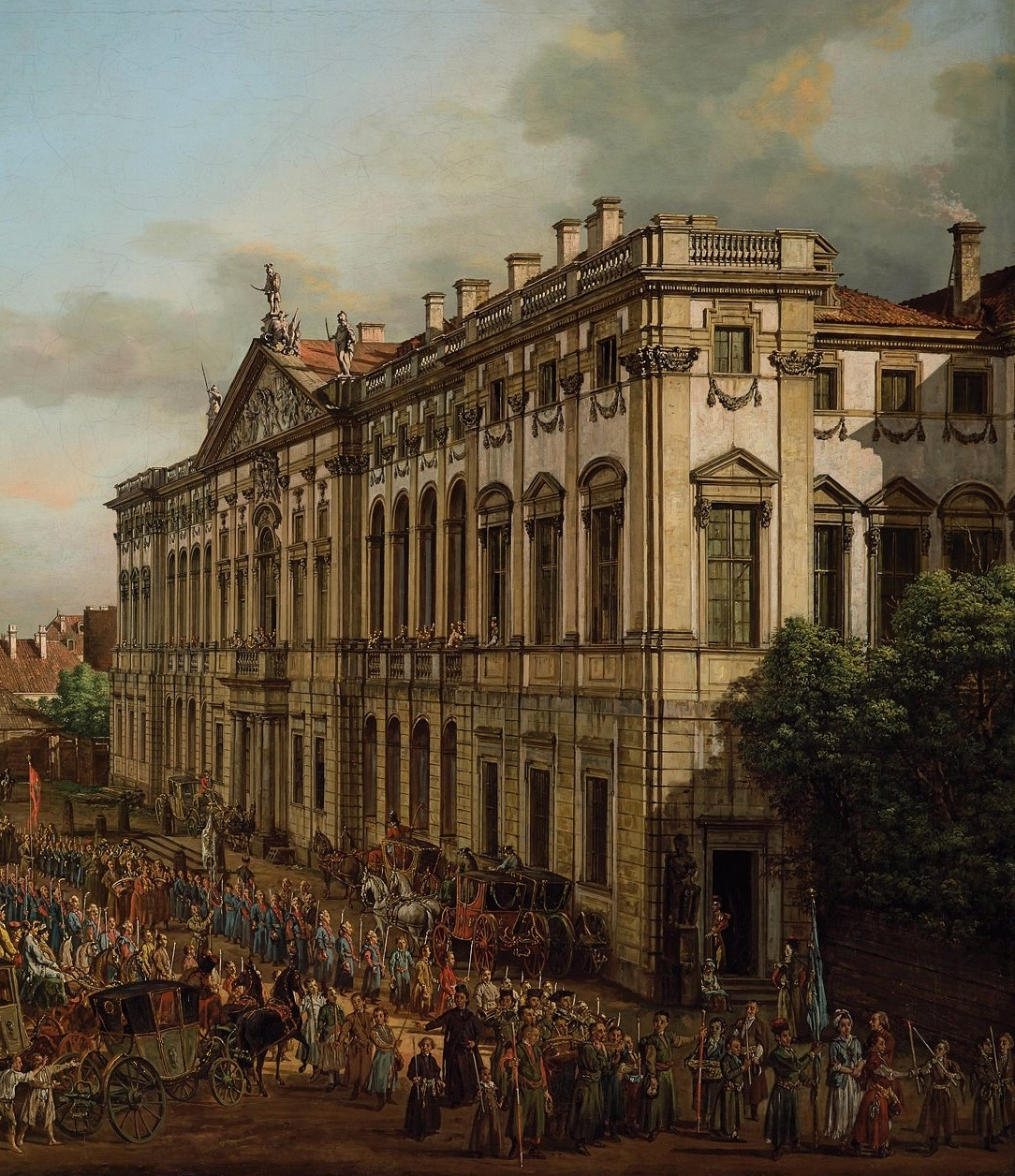
Krasiński Palace

Macaronic language, Polish mingled with Latin, was frequently used in writing. The mid 18th century movement to clear Polish from the Latin admixture was led by Stanisław Konarski and Franciszek Bohomolec.

Royal court theater continued under John Casimir, John III, August II and August III. Foreign troupes were brought from Italy (Italian repertoire was the most popular), France and Germany. At least ten magnate-supported theaters functioned in Saxon times, including one at the Ujazdów Castle, where Stanisław Lubomirski staged his comedies, and one at Podhorce, where the historic plays of Hetman Wacław Rzewuski were being shown. School theaters were maintained by the Jesuits, Piarists and Theatines and there were religious spectacles for the general public, including mystery plays, passions and nativity scenes, typically with folk elements.

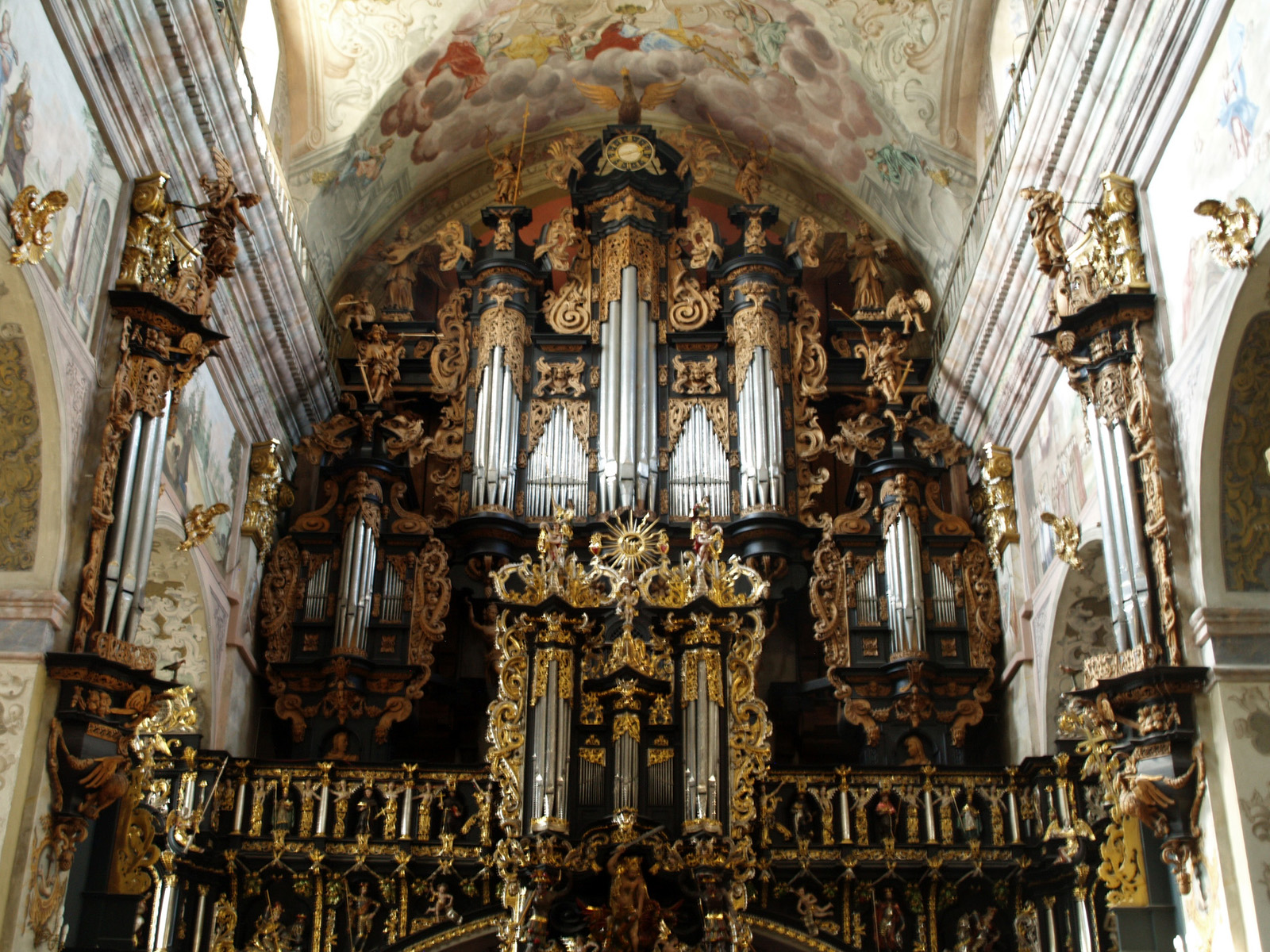
The church organ in Leżajsk has been rebuilt several times

Music served mostly the needs of the Church and had remained under primarily Italian influence. Pipe organs were brought from abroad and constructed locally; the instrument built in 1682 in Leżajsk is of the highest quality. Many instrumental and vocal ensembles were active at various church institutions. Bartłomiej Pękiel composed polyphonic music including a cappella masses and the first in Poland cantatas. Stanisław Sylwester Szarzyński wrote instrumental music of which only one sonata has survived. Secular (court bands) and folk music was also practiced and the mazurka folk dance crystallized during that period. Foreign operas and ballets were staged in Warsaw under Augustus II and Augustus III.

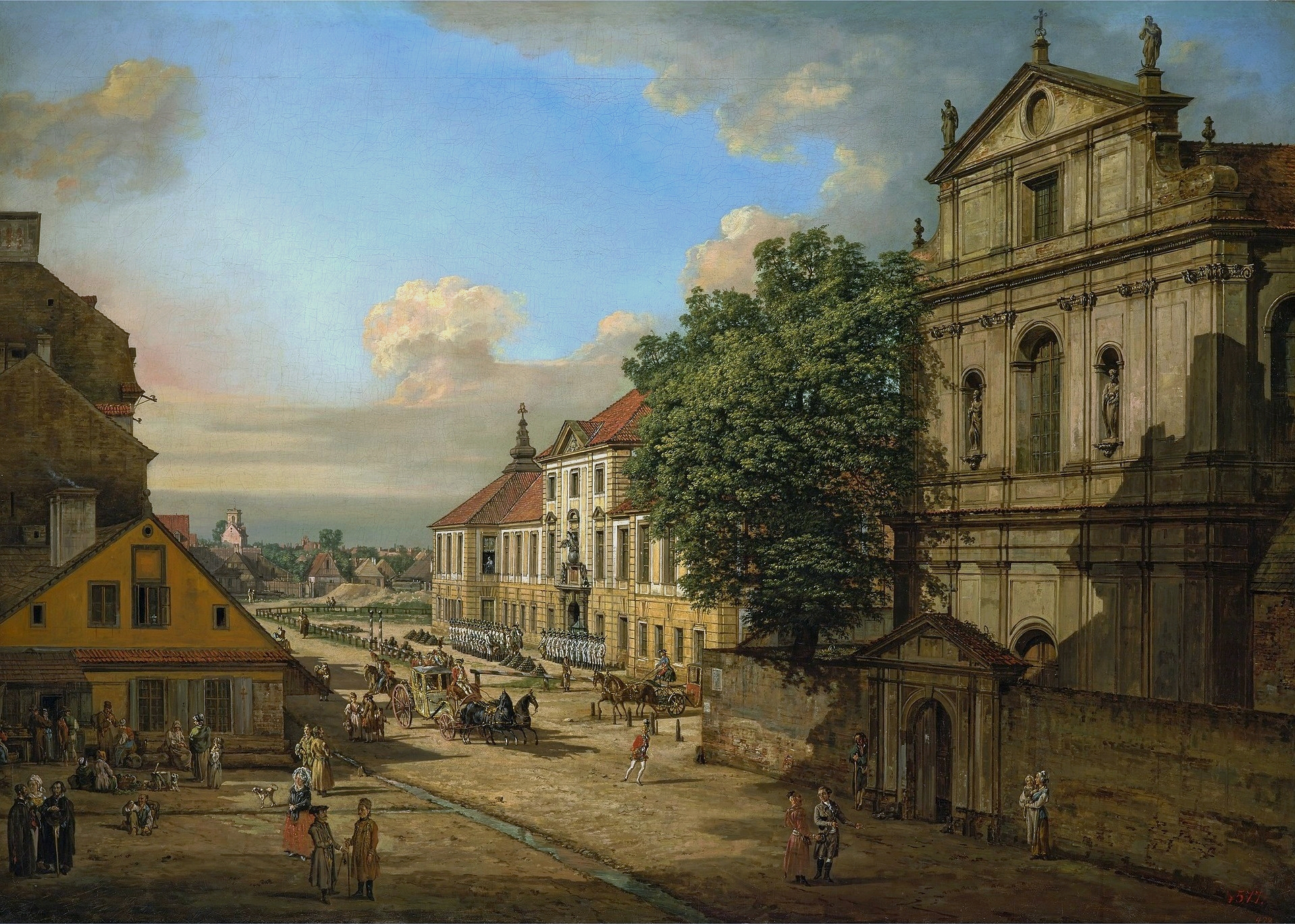
The Bridgettines Church in Warsaw no longer exists

The finest artistic manifestation of the Baroque in Poland is its architecture, developed under the Italian, Dutch, German and French influence, with a strong local component. The new elaborate residential and religious compounds, or the rebuilding of older, war-damaged structures, were financed by magnates and the Church. St. Peter and St. Paul's Church in Vilnius or Church of St. Anthony of Padua at Czerniaków, Warsaw are examples of the Baroque's richly decorative (see stucco) style. Vault or dome painting, subordinate to the overall aesthetic design, compounded the impression by using optical illusion effects. Sculpture also had the primary function of complementing the design of the interiors.

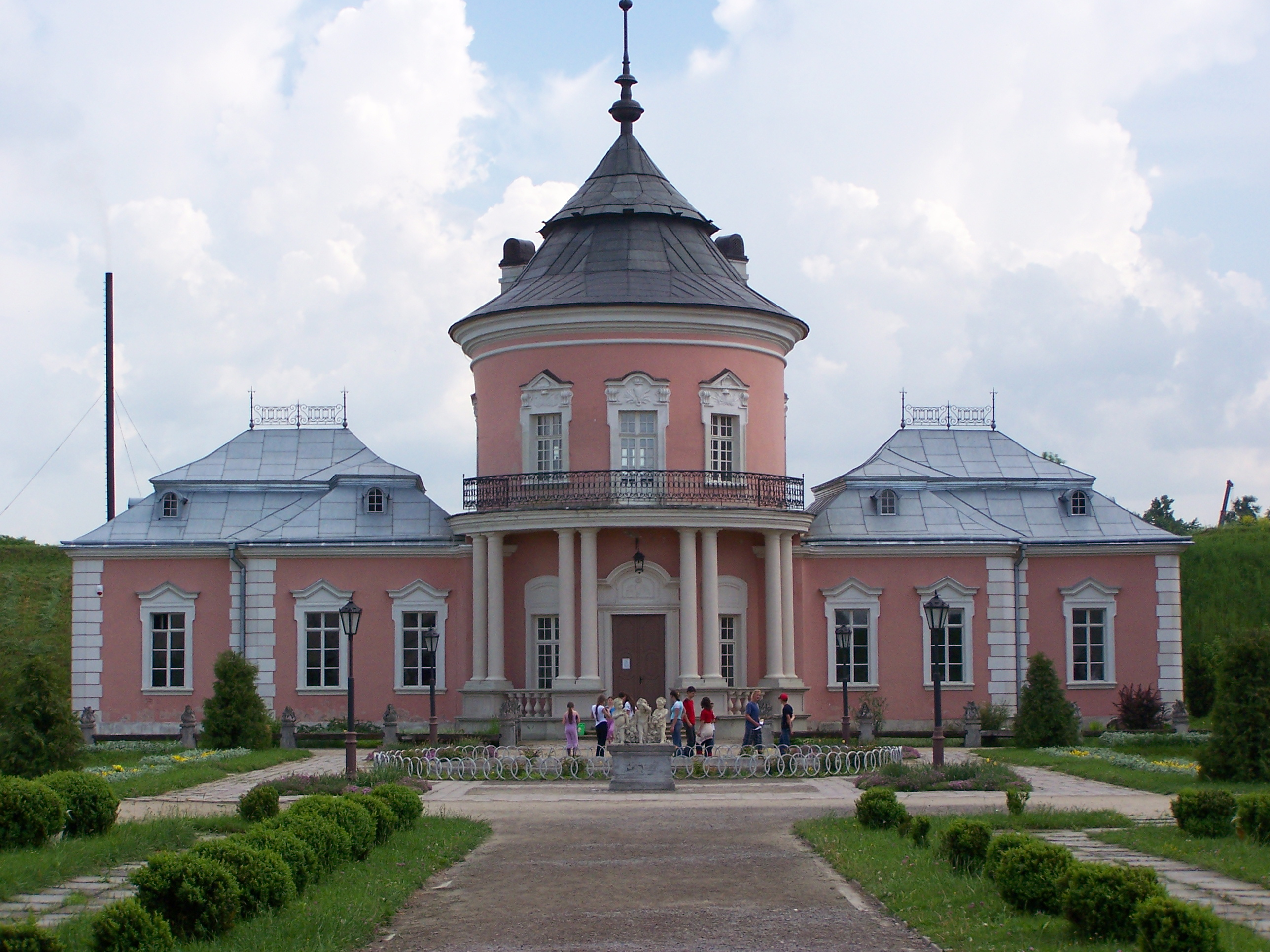
Chinese Palace in Zolochiv

The Krasiński Palace built in Warsaw in the second half of the 17th century by Tylman van Gameren is an impressive monumental structure. Afterwards, however, residential forms more convenient and intimate, while still preserving much of the former grandeur, were given preference. The Wilanów Palace of King John III is an early representative of this trend. The Rococo style was triumphant under the Wettin rulers and the present Saxon Palace in Warsaw was rebuilt by Augustus II in that manner. Numerous magnate residencies, in Warsaw and throughout the country, where the former fortifications were replaced with parks and pavilions, followed the trend.

Gentry manors were built of wood and so were many country churches. Their builders were local and interesting native styles are still represented in extant structures.

Jerzy Siemiginowski-Eleuter was a prominent painter, one of several who worked for John III. Krzysztof Lubieniecki and Teodor Lubieniecki of the Polish Brethren, painted in the West. Szymon Czechowicz represented religious painting in the 18th century. Of particular interest is the Sarmatist portrait painting. Usually anonymous, it often faithfully conveys crucial individual characteristics of ordinary Polish nobles and magnates, even if constrained by its artistic convention. Coffin portraits are an important subcategory of this type.

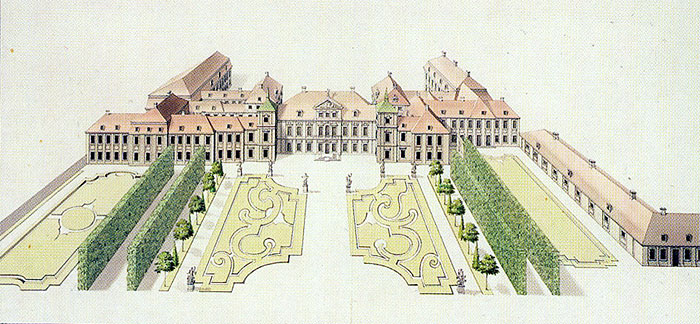
Saxon Palace and its gardens

Even with its civilizational influence diminished, the Commonwealth continued as a medium or conduit of cultural and diplomatic contacts between the West and the East, with the Polish culture and language being of international importance and retaining its attractiveness in a number of foreign (Tatar, Russian, Wallachian, Moldavian, German) circles and uses. This cultural attraction contributed to the Polonization in the 17th century of the majority of Lithuanian and Ruthenian nobility of the Commonwealth. The ethnically non-Polish urban classes were much less affected by this process and the peasantry still less, so that the apparent cultural and linguistic uniformity of the country was largely an illusion. The ethnically Polish groups west of the Commonwealth (in Silesia and Pomerania) were often disregarded by the Polish establishment as non-nobles, and their ties with the country of their ethnic origin were getting weaker. These factors made it later difficult for Poles to find their proper place within the process of formation of modern European nations and states.

=== Early Enlightenment ===
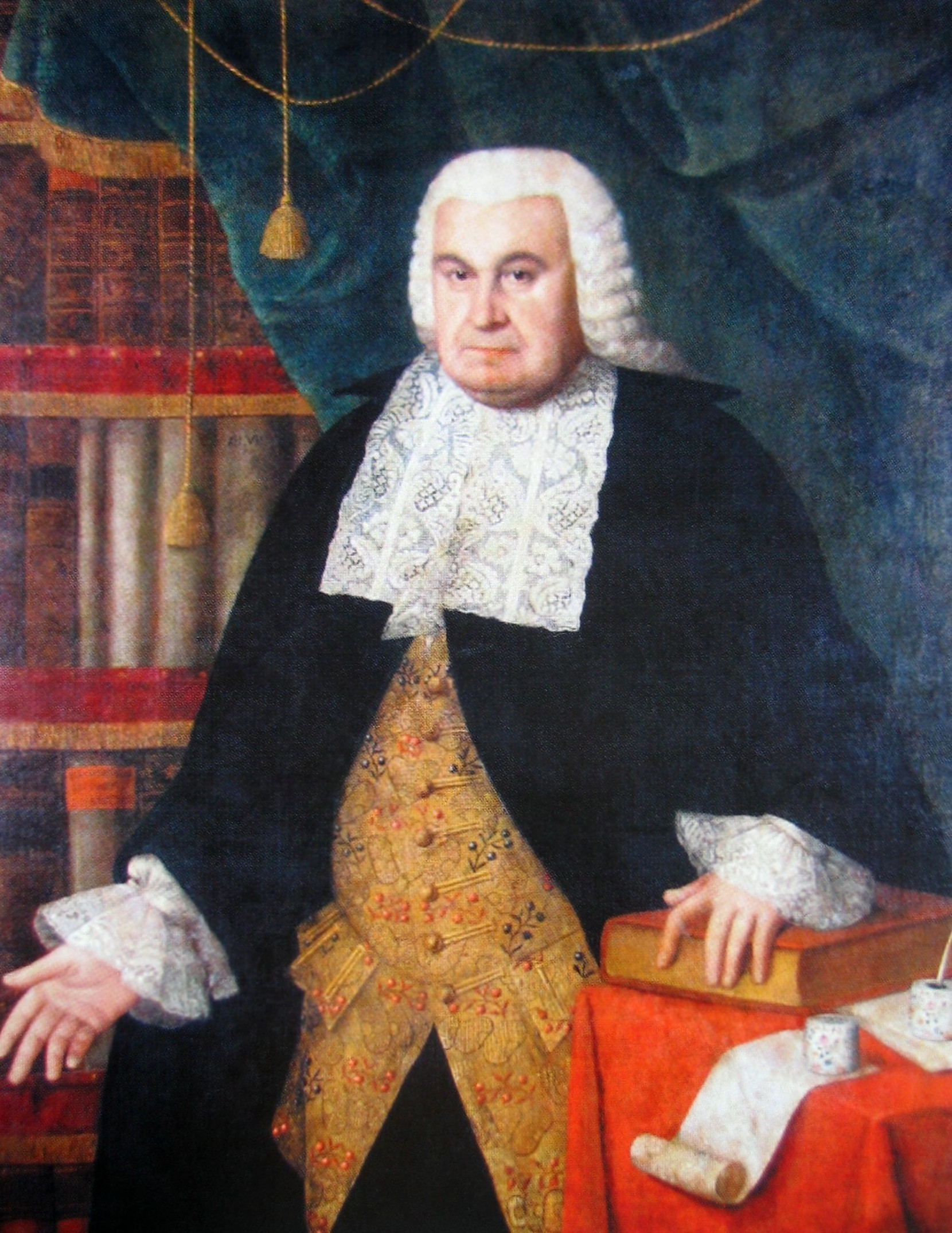
Gottfried Lengnich

The Enlightenment currents had been fully developed in Western Europe, especially in England and France, when its ideology and paradigms reached the Commonwealth during the last quarter-century of the union with Saxony period. Augustus II propagated France's culture, while Stanisław Leszczyński its social and philosophical thought. Protestant burghers of Royal Prussia came early under the influence of rationalist philosophy. They and many progressive Polish Catholics followed the Saxons and accepted the moderate rationalism of Christian Wolff and were inspired by it.

The postulated by the Enlightenment thinkers social changes depended on an improved level and wider dissemination of education. The Theatines had few colleges in the Commonwealth, but theirs were the first attempts at school reform in the 1830s. In Lunéville, Lorraine, Stanisław Leszczyński established a corps of cadets, a school for the Polish and local nobility. The most crucial turned out to be the initiative of Stanisław Konarski. The young Piarist taught in schools conducted by his order, went to study and teach in Rome, and upon returning via France, Germany and Austria committed himself to pedagogic, scientific and publicist work. In 1740 he established the Collegium Nobilium in Warsaw, a high caliber secondary education institution for nobility youth. The school promoted civic duties through such means as debates and the school theater, for which he wrote a tragedy and where Voltaire's tragedies were shown. Despite many objections from the Jesuits and others, the trend set by the Collegium Nobillium was followed. In 1754 all the Piarist colleges were reformed and the Jesuit schools soon followed. New textbooks and teacher training methods were implemented. In the area of school theater Konarski's work was continued by Franciszek Bohomolec, who, revising the out of dated repertoire, wrote or adapted many comedies.

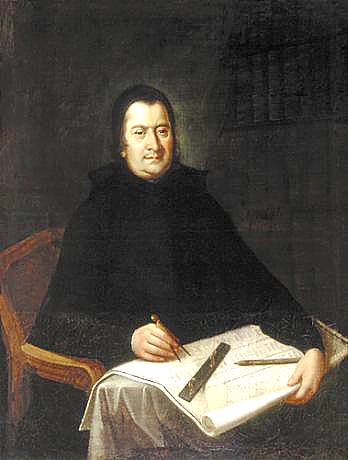
Stanisław Konarski

The bishops Andrzej Stanisław Załuski and Józef Andrzej Załuski became great patrons of science. In 1747 they opened a public library in Warsaw, known as the Załuski Library, one of the largest in Europe. Józef Załuski gathered scientists and charged them with reviving and expanding the Polish scientific and other cultural achievements of the Renaissance era. Foundations were laid for the development of Polish bibliography and many publishing actions were initiated.

Konarski undertook to compile all of the sejm legislative records in his Volumina legum. Andrzej Stanisław Załuski extended his patronage to the most outstanding historian in the Commonwealth, Gottfried Lengnich of Danzig, future teacher of Stanisław Antoni Poniatowski. Lengnich wrote in 1742 Ius publicum Regni Poloniae, an outstanding description of the Polish political system, and a history of Royal Prussia. Related work was done in the first half of the 18th century by a number of researchers in Danzig, Thorn, Elbing and Königsberg. Scientists of German origin were responsible for and catalyzed much of the early scientific revival in the Commonwealth.

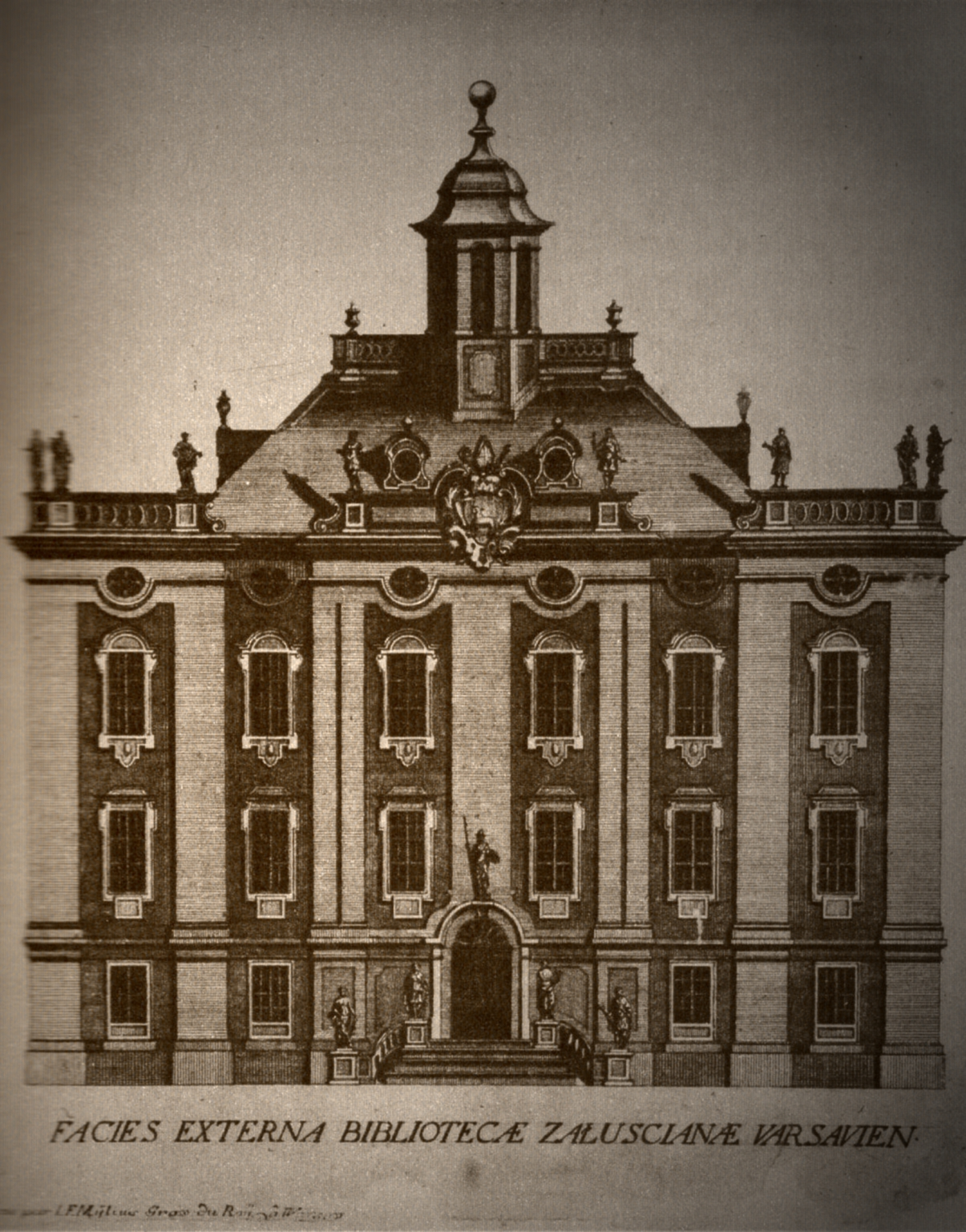
Załuski Library

Publications and periodicals were increasing in number and served the purpose of educating and informing the public. The earliest ones were published in German and many were intended for foreign consumption, beginning with Lengnich's Polnische Bibliothek in 1718–19. Lorenz Christoph Mizler of Saxony postulated economic innovations and edited and published Poland related periodicals in German in 1753–56 (Warschauer Bibliothek, Acta Litteraria), and in Polish Nowe Wiadomości Ekonomiczne i Uczone (New information economical and learned) in 1758–61. The Polish Patriot by Teodor Bauch of Thorn and Monitor by Adam Kazimierz Czartoryski were the first "moral" periodicals, dedicated to the new ideology and ethics.

From the circle of Stanisław Leszczyński came in 1743 (dated 1733) Głos wolny wolność ubezpieczający (A free voice in defense of freedom), with a comprehensive program of political and social reform. The publication advocated personal freedom for peasants and taking steps to secure their greater economic independence. Stefan Garczyński wrote in 1750 The Anatomy of the Polish Commonwealth, where he strongly criticized the social and economic plight of the lower classes and promoted economic policies based on mercantilism.

Of special importance were the writings of Stanisław Konarski. Beyond school reform, he fought over many years for reform of the central government and for moral renewal of the noble class, including lessening of the burdens and improving the lot of non-nobility. In his most important work O skutecznym rad sposobie (On an effective way of councils, 1760–63), he unveiled a far-reaching reform program for the Polish parliamentary system and political reorganization of the Commonwealth, which included aiding the monarch with a permanent governing council.

== See also ==
- Polish–Lithuanian Commonwealth
- History of the Polish–Lithuanian Commonwealth (1569–1648)
- History of the Polish–Lithuanian Commonwealth (1764–95)
- History of Poland (1569–1795)

== Notes ==
a. This compromise deal was not truly accepted by Poles, who thought of eastern Ukraine as being wrongfully taken from its, since the Union of Lublin, mother country; by Russians, who since the Treaty of Pereyaslav though of all of Ukraine as rightfully belonging under the Tsardom's rule; and by Ukrainians, who fought for a country of their own.

b. Because of the (completed by the first half of the 18th century) Polonization of Ruthenian aristocracy, the Ukrainian people became deprived of their national elites. The noble clans saw their position initially as being allied with the Polish state, but in time assumed its fundamental membership attributes. Ukrainian intellectual elites were restored only during the later part of the 19th century.

c. Before the Khmelnytsky Uprising, the sejmiks of the Kiev Voivodeship and Bratslav Voivodeship deliberated in the majority Ruthenian language, despite the increasing proportion of the Polish and Lithuanian szlachta settled there. Among the one hundred researched Ruthenian noble families from the region, most were opposed to the Union of Brest and almost all fought under Bohdan Khmelnytsky's command.

d. The extreme deterioration of the condition of the Polish and Ruthenian serfs caused the degeneration of their status into a form of slavery, referred to in Polish historiography as wtórna pańszczyzna or wtórne poddaństwo [secondary serfdom]. Peasants were basically free people, capable of upward mobility, until the 15th century. After the early modern precipitous decline, significant improvements in the lives of this large majority of the country's population took place only in the middle and later 19th century, in partitioned Poland.
