= Constitution of 3 May 1791 =

Polish–Lithuanian Commonwealth constitution

Government Act
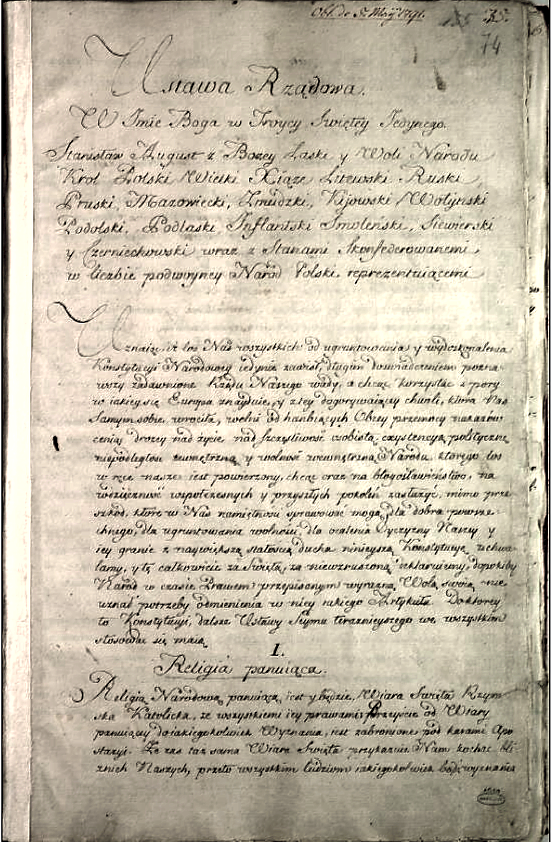
- First page of original manuscript of Constitution of 3 May 1791, registered (upper right corner) on 5 May 1791
- Created: 6 October 1788 – 3 May 1791
- Ratified: 3 May 1791; 235 years ago
- Location: Central Archives of Historical Records, Warsaw
- Authors: King Stanisław August Poniatowski; Stanisław Małachowski; Hugo Kołłątaj; Ignacy Potocki; Stanisław Staszic; Scipione Piattoli et al.

Full text
- Constitution of 3 May 1791 at Wikisource

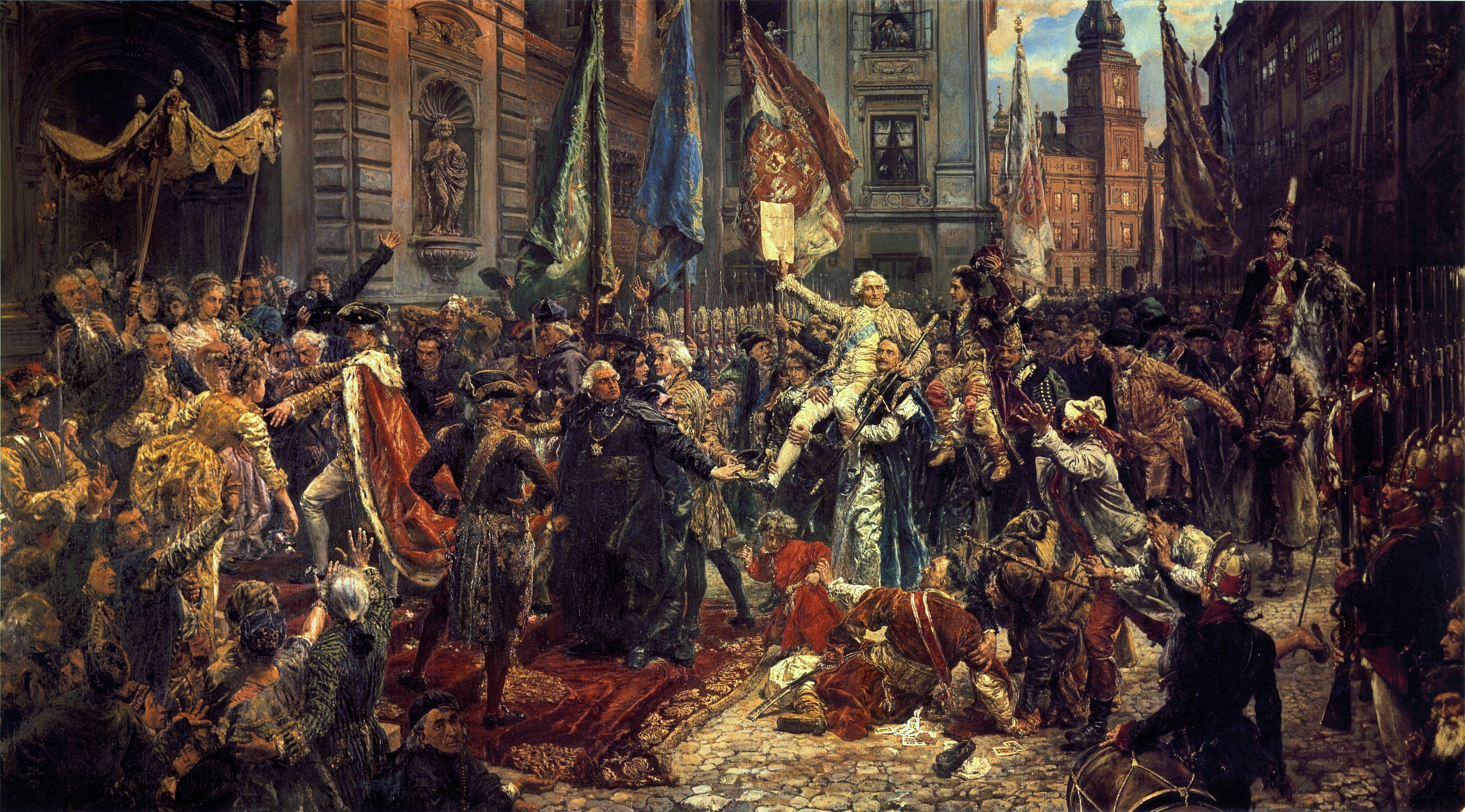
Constitution of 3 May 1791, by Matejko. Foreground: King Stanisław August (left) enters St John's Cathedral, in Warsaw, where deputies will swear to uphold the Constitution. Background: the Royal Castle, where the Constitution has just been adopted.

The Constitution of 3 May 1791, (Note: Polish: Konstytucja 3 maja; Lithuanian: Gegužės trečiosios konstitucija; Belarusian: Канстытуцыя 3 мая, romanized: Kanstytucyja 3 maja or Канстытуцыя 3 траўня, romanized: Kanstytucyja 3 traŭnia) titled the Government Act, (Note: Polish: Ustawa Rządowa) was a written constitution for the Polish–Lithuanian Commonwealth that was adopted by the Great Sejm that met between 1788 and 1792. The Commonwealth was a dual monarchy comprising the Crown of the Kingdom of Poland and the Grand Duchy of Lithuania; the new constitution was intended to address political questions following a period of political agitation and gradual reform that began with the Convocation Sejm of 1764 and the election that year of the Commonwealth's last monarch, Stanisław August Poniatowski. It was the first codified, modern constitution (possessing checks and balances and a tripartite separation of powers) in Europe and the second in the world, after that of the United States.

The Constitution sought to implement a more effective constitutional monarchy, introduced political equality between townspeople and nobility, and placed the peasants under the government's protection, mitigating the worst abuses of serfdom. It banned pernicious parliamentary institutions such as the liberum veto, which had put the Sejm at the mercy of any single deputy, who could veto and thus undo all the legislation adopted by that Sejm. The Commonwealth's neighbours reacted with hostility to the adoption of the Constitution. King Frederick William II of Prussia broke the Prussian alliance with the Commonwealth, joining with Imperial Russia under Catherine the Great and the anti-reform Targowica Confederation of Polish-Lithuanian magnates, to defeat the Commonwealth in the Polish–Russian War of 1792.

The 1791 Constitution was in force for less than 19 months. It was declared null and void by the Grodno Sejm that met in 1793, though the Sejm's legal power to do so was questionable. The Second and Third Partitions of the Commonwealth (1793, 1795) ultimately ended Poland's and Lithuania's sovereign existence until the close of World War I in 1918. Over the ensuing 123 years, the legacy of the 1791 Constitution helped sustain Polish and Lithuanian aspirations for the eventual restoration of their sovereignty. In the words of two of its principal authors, Ignacy Potocki and Hugo Kołłątaj, the 1791 Constitution was "the last will and testament of the expiring Homeland".

== Background ==
Polish constitutionalism can be traced to the 13th century, when government by consensus and representation was already well established in the young Polish state. The emergence of parliamentary bodies, the sejm and sejmiki, followed in the first half of the 16th century. By the 17th century, Poland's legal and political tradition was characterized as parliamentary institutions and a system of checks and balances on state power, which was itself limited by decentralization. The idea of a contractual state embodied in texts like the Henrician Articles and the Pacta conventa; the concept of individual liberties; and the notion that the monarch owed duties to his subjects, can be noted. This system, which primarily benefited the Polish-Lithuanian nobility (szlachta), came to be known as the "nobles' democracy".

=== End of Golden Age ===
The 1791 Constitution was a response to the increasingly perilous situation in the Polish–Lithuanian Commonwealth, which had been a major European power only a century earlier and was still the largest state on the continent. In the 1590s, at the peak of the nobles' democracy, King Sigismund III Vasa's court preacher — the Jesuit Piotr Skarga — had condemned the weaknesses of the Commonwealth. In the same period, writers and philosophers such as Andrzej Frycz Modrzewski and Wawrzyniec Grzymała Goślicki, and the egzekucja praw (Execution-of-the-Laws) reform movement led by Jan Zamoyski had advocated political reforms. In 1656, in what came to be known as the Lwów Oath, Sigismund's son King John II Casimir Vasa made a solemn vow on behalf of the entire Polish-Lithuanian Commonwealth that he would free the Polish peasants "from the unjust burdens and oppression." As he was struggling with the Sejm, in 1661 John Casimir — whose reign saw highly destructive wars and obstructionism by the nobility — correctly predicted that the Commonwealth was in danger of a partition by Russia, Brandenburg and Austria.

As the Sejm failed to implement sufficient reforms, the state machinery became increasingly dysfunctional. A significant cause of the Commonwealth's downfall was the liberum veto ("free veto"), which, since 1652, had allowed any Sejm deputy to nullify all the legislation enacted by that Sejm. As a result, deputies bribed by magnates or foreign powers — primarily from the Russian Empire, the Kingdom of Prussia and France, which had an ongoing revolution — or deputies who believed they were living in an unprecedented "Golden Age" paralysed the Commonwealth's government for over a century. The threat of the liberum veto could only be overridden by the establishment of a "confederated sejm", which was immune to the liberum veto. Declaring that a sejm either constituted a "confederation" or belonged to one was a contrivance prominently used by foreign interests in the 18th century to force a legislative outcome.

By the early 18th century, the magnates of Poland and Lithuania controlled the state, ensuring that no reforms that might weaken their privileged status (the "Golden Freedoms") would be enacted. The ineffective monarchs who were elected to the Commonwealth throne in the early 18th century, Augustus II the Strong and Augustus III of Poland of the House of Wettin, did not improve matters. The Wettins, used to the absolute rule practiced in their native Saxony, tried to govern through intimidation and the use of force, which led to a series of conflicts between their supporters and opponents — including another pretender to the Polish-Lithuanian throne, King Stanisław Leszczyński. Those conflicts often took the form of confederations — legal rebellions against the king permitted under the Golden Freedoms — including the Warsaw Confederation (1704), Sandomierz Confederation, Tarnogród Confederation, Dzików Confederation and the War of the Polish Succession. Only 8 out of 18 Sejm sessions during the reign of Augustus II (1694–1733) passed legislation. For 30 years during the reign of Augustus III, only one session was able to pass legislation. The government was near collapse, giving rise to the term "Polish anarchy", and the country was managed by provincial assemblies and magnates.

Other reform attempts in the Wettin era were led by individuals such as Stanisław Dunin-Karwicki, Stanisław A. Szczuka, Kazimierz Karwowski and Michał Józef Massalski; these mostly proved to be futile.

=== Early reforms ===
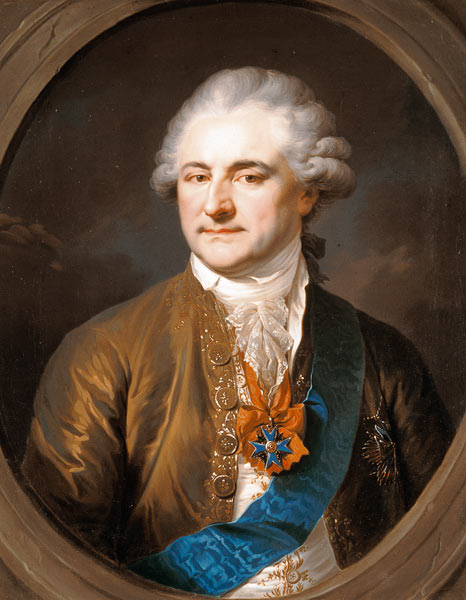
King Stanisław August Poniatowski, principal author of the Constitution of 3 May 1791. A year later, he acquiesced in its demise; this was seen by Constitution defenders as high treason, per the Constitution's Article VII and section six (sexto) of Article VIII, and per the Declaration of the Assembled Estates, of 5 May 1791.

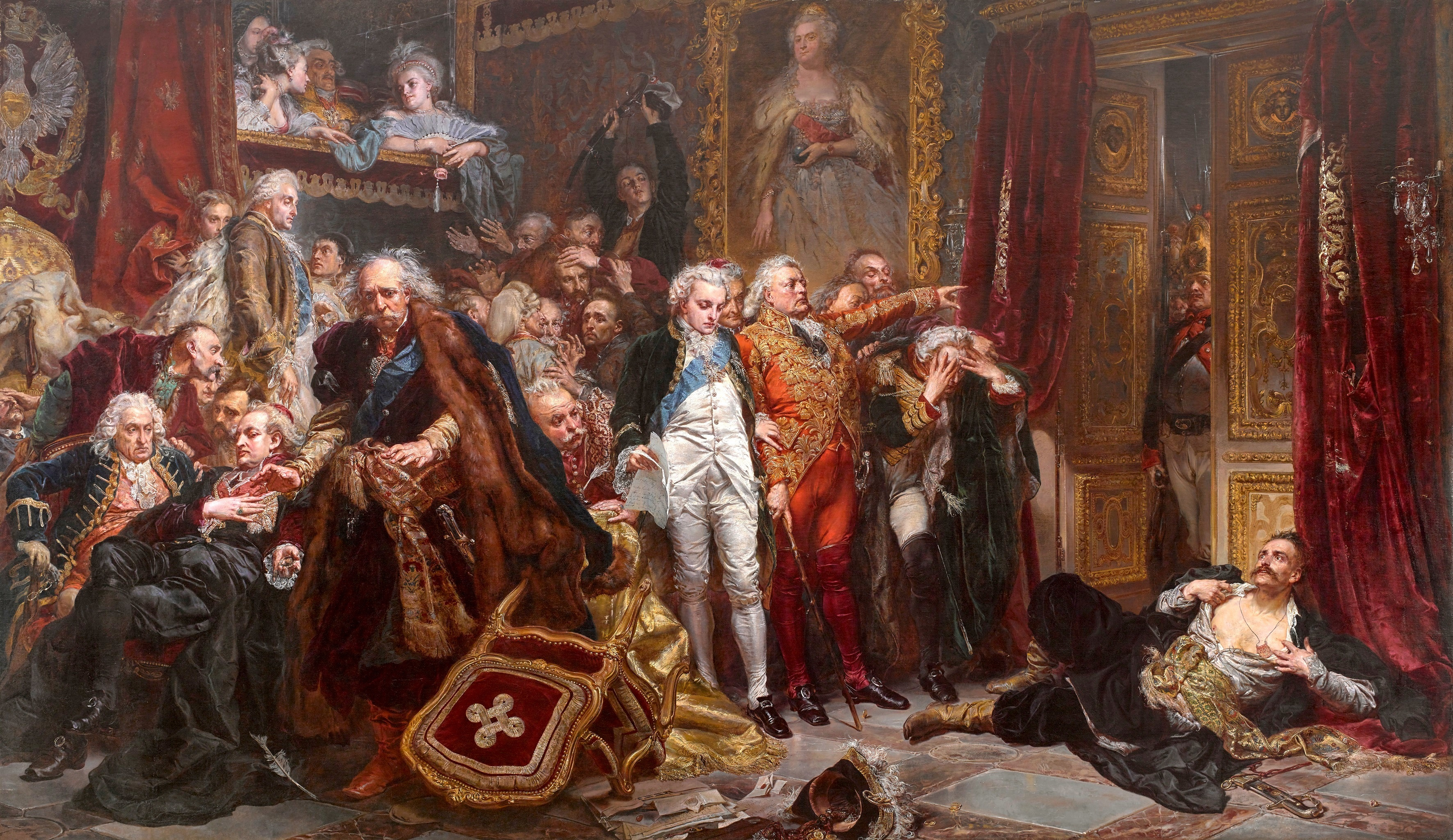
In September 1773, Tadeusz Rejtan (on floor, lower right) tries to prevent ratification of the First Partition of the Polish–Lithuanian Commonwealth by barring other Sejm deputies from entering the Sejm chamber. Painting Rejtan, by Matejko.

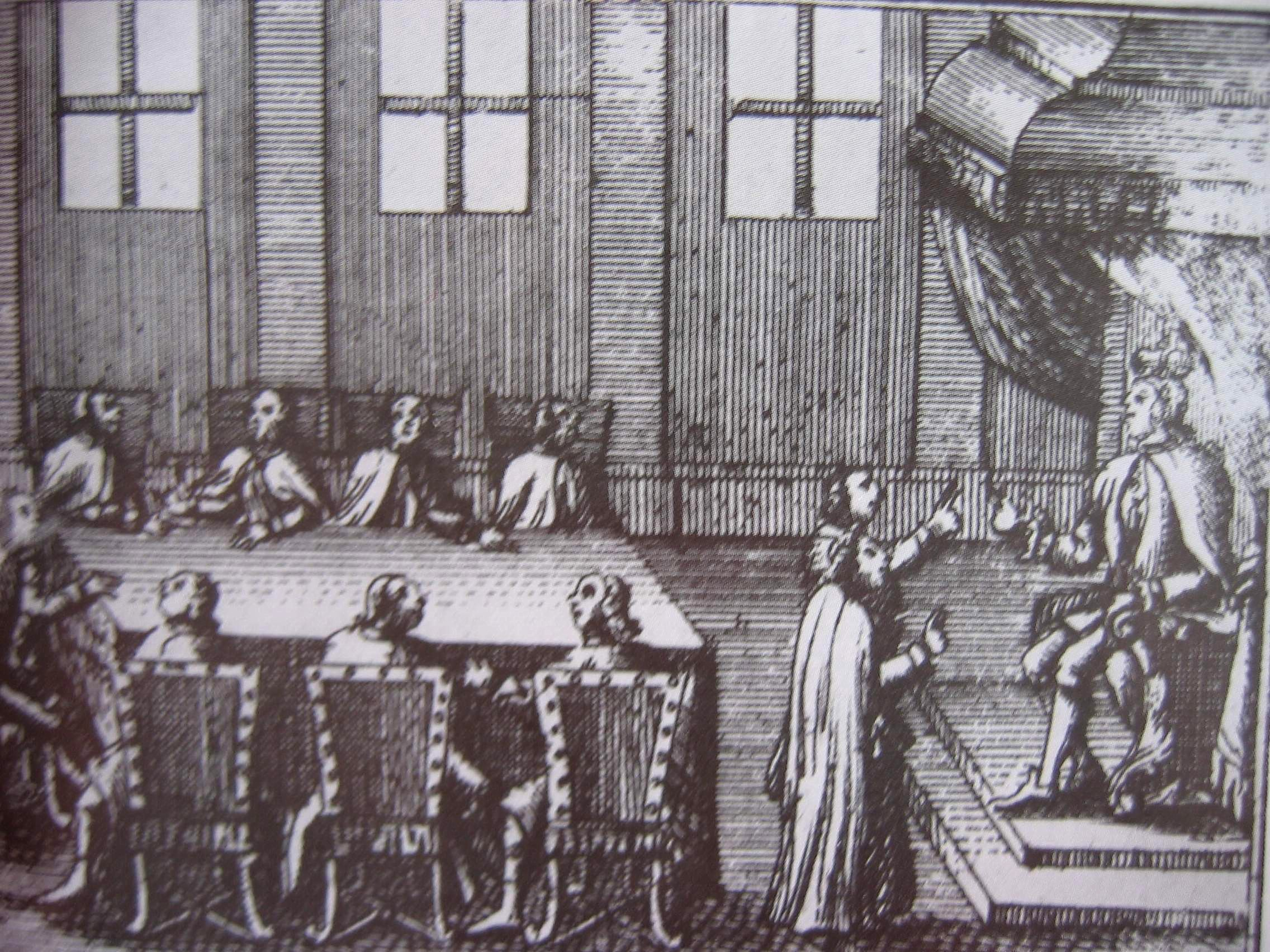
From his election, King Stanisław August Poniatowski worked to develop an executive government council. In 1775, the Partition Sejm established a Permanent Council, after Russia's Catherine the Great concluded it would serve her purposes.

The Enlightenment greatly affected the thinking of influential Commonwealth circles during the reign (1764–1795) of its last monarch, Stanisław II August Poniatowski. The King was an "enlightened" Polish magnate who had been a deputy to several Sejms between 1750 and 1764 and had a deeper understanding of Polish politics than previous monarchs. The Convocation Sejm of 1764, which elected Poniatowski to the throne, was controlled by the reformist Czartoryski Familia and was backed by Russian military forces invited by the Czartoryskis. In exchange for passing decrees favorable to them, the Russians and Prussians let the confederated Convocation Sejm enact a number of reforms, including the weakening of the liberum veto and its no longer applying to treasury and economic matters. A more comprehensive reform package was presented by Andrzej Zamoyski, but opposition from Prussia, Russia, and the Polish nobility thwarted this ambitious program, which had proposed deciding all motions by majority vote.

In part because his election had been imposed by Empress Catherine the Great, Poniatowski's political position was weak from the start. He proceeded with cautious reforms, such as the establishment of fiscal and military ministries and the introduction of a national customs tariff, which was soon abandoned due to opposition from Prussia's Frederick the Great. These measures had already been authorized by the Convocation Sejm; more legislative and executive improvements inspired by the Familia or the King were implemented during and after the 1764 Sejm.

The Commonwealth's magnates viewed reform with suspicion and neighboring powers, content with the deterioration of the Commonwealth, abhorred the thought of a resurgent and democratic power on their borders. With the Commonwealth Army reduced to around 16,000, it was easy for its neighbors to intervene directly — the Imperial Russian Army numbered 300,000 and the Prussian Army and Imperial Austrian Army had 200,000 each.

Russia's Empress Catherine and Prussia's King Frederick II provoked a conflict between members of the Sejm and the King over civil rights for religious minorities, such as Protestants and Greek Orthodox whose positions, which were guaranteed equal with the Catholic majority by the Warsaw Confederation of 1573, had worsened considerably. Catherine and Frederick declared their support for the szlachta and their "liberties", and by October 1767 Russian troops had assembled outside Warsaw in support of the conservative Radom Confederation. The King and his adherents had little choice but to acquiesce to Russian demands. During the Repnin Sejm (named after the unofficially presiding Russian ambassador Nicholas Repnin) the King accepted the five "eternal and invariable principles" which Catherine had vowed to "protect for all time to come in the name of Poland's liberties": the election of kings, the right of liberum veto, the right to renounce allegiance to and raise rebellion against the king (rokosz), the szlachta's exclusive right to hold office and land, and landowners' power over their peasants. Thus all the privileges ("Golden Freedoms") of the nobility that had made the Commonwealth ungovernable were guaranteed as unalterable in the Cardinal Laws. The Cardinal Laws and the rights of "religious dissenters" passed by the Repnin Sejm were personally guaranteed by Empress Catherine. By these acts of legislation, for the first time, Russia formally intervened in the Commonwealth's constitutional affairs.

During the 1768 Sejm, Repnin showed his disregard for local resistance by arranging the abduction and imprisonment of Kajetan Sołtyk, Józef A. Załuski, Wacław Rzewuski and Seweryn Rzewuski, all vocal opponents of foreign domination and the recently proclaimed policies. The Polish–Lithuanian Commonwealth had legally and practically become a protectorate of the Russian Empire. Nonetheless, several minor beneficial reforms were adopted, political rights of the religious minorities were restored and the need for more reforms was becoming increasingly recognized.

King Stanisław August's acquiescence to the Russian intervention encountered some opposition. On 29 February 1768, several magnates — including Józef Pułaski and his young son Kazimierz Pułaski (Casimir Pulaski) — vowing to oppose Russian influence, declared Stanisław August a lackey of Russia and Catherine, and formed a confederation at the town of Bar. The Bar Confederation focused on limiting the influence of foreigners in Commonwealth affairs, and being pro-Catholic was generally opposed to religious tolerance. It began a civil war to overthrow the King, but its irregular forces were overwhelmed by Russian intervention in 1772.

The defeat of the Bar Confederation set the scene for the partition treaty of 5 August 1772, which was signed at Saint Petersburg by Russia, Prussia, and Austria. The treaty divested the Polish–Lithuanian Commonwealth of about a third of its territory and population — over 200,000 km^{2} (77,220 sq mi) and 4 million people. The three powers justified their annexation, citing anarchy in the Commonwealth and its refusal to cooperate with its neighbors' efforts to restore order. King Stanisław August yielded and on 19 April 1773, he called the Sejm into session. Only 102 of about 200 deputies attended what became known as the Partition Sejm. The rest were aware of the King's decision and refused. Despite protests from the deputy Tadeusz Rejtan and others, the treaty — later known as the First Partition of Poland — was ratified.

The first of the three successive 18th century partitions of Commonwealth territory that would eventually remove Poland's sovereignty shocked the Commonwealth's inhabitants and made it clear to progressive minds that the Commonwealth must either reform or perish. In the thirty years before the Constitution, there was a rising interest among progressive thinkers in constitutional reform. Before the First Partition, a Polish noble, Michał Wielhorski was sent to France by the Bar Confederation to ask the philosophes Gabriel Bonnot de Mably and Jean-Jacques Rousseau for their suggestions on a new constitution for a reformed Poland. Mably submitted his recommendations Du gouvernement et des lois en Pologne (The Government and Laws of Poland) in 1770–1771, whereas Rousseau finished his Considerations on the Government of Poland in 1772 when the First Partition was already underway. Works advocating the need for reform and presenting specific solutions were published in the Commonwealth by Polish–Lithuanian thinkers: On an Effective Way of Councils or on the Conduct of Ordinary Sejms (1761–1763), by Stanisław Konarski, founder of the Collegium Nobilium; Political Thoughts on Civil Liberties (1775) and Patriotic Letters (1778–1778), by Józef Wybicki, author of the lyrics of the Polish National Anthem; (Anonymous Letters to Stanisław Małachowski (1788–1789) and The Political Law of the Polish Nation (1790), by Hugo Kołłątaj, head of the Kołłątaj's Forge party; and Remarks on the Life of Jan Zamoyski (1787), by Stanisław Staszic. Ignacy Krasicki's satires of the Great Sejm era were also seen as crucial to giving the constitution moral and political support.

A new wave of reforms supported by progressive magnates such as the Czartoryski family and King Stanisław August were introduced at the Partition Sejm. The most important included the 1773 establishment of the Commission of National Education (Komisja Edukacji Narodowej) — the first ministry of education in the world. New schools were opened, uniform textbooks were printed, teachers received better education and poor students were provided with scholarships. The Commonwealth's military was to be modernised and funding to create a larger standing army was agreed. Economic and commercial reforms — including some intended to cover the increased military budget previously shunned as unimportant by the szlachta — were introduced. A new executive assembly, the 36-strong Permanent Council comprising five ministries with limited legislative powers, was established, giving the Commonwealth a governing body in constant session between Sejms and therefore immune to their liberum veto disruptions.

In 1776, the Sejm commissioned former chancellor Andrzej Zamoyski to draft a new legal code. By 1780, he and his collaborators had produced the Zamoyski Code (Zbiór praw sądowych). It would have strengthened royal power, made all officials answerable to the Sejm, placed the clergy and their finances under state supervision, and deprived landless szlachta ("barefoot szlachta") of many of their legal immunities. The Code would also have improved the situation of non-nobles — townspeople and peasants. Zamoyski's progressive legal code, containing elements of constitutional reform, met with opposition from native conservative szlachta and foreign powers; the 1780 Sejm did not adopt it.

== Constitution's adoption ==
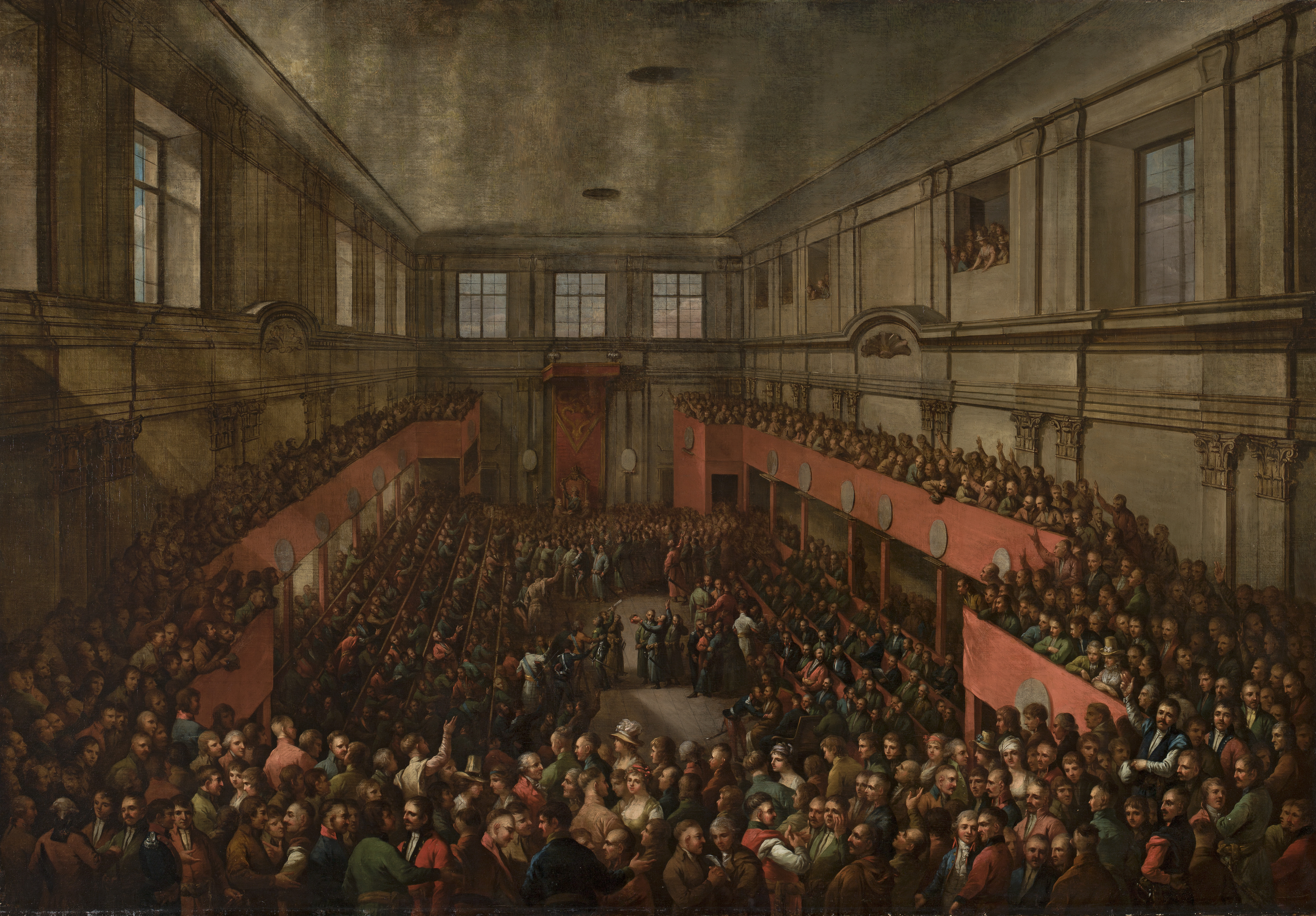
Senate Chamber of Warsaw's Royal Castle, where the Constitution of 3 May 1791 was adopted, painting by Kazimierz Wojniakowski, 1806.

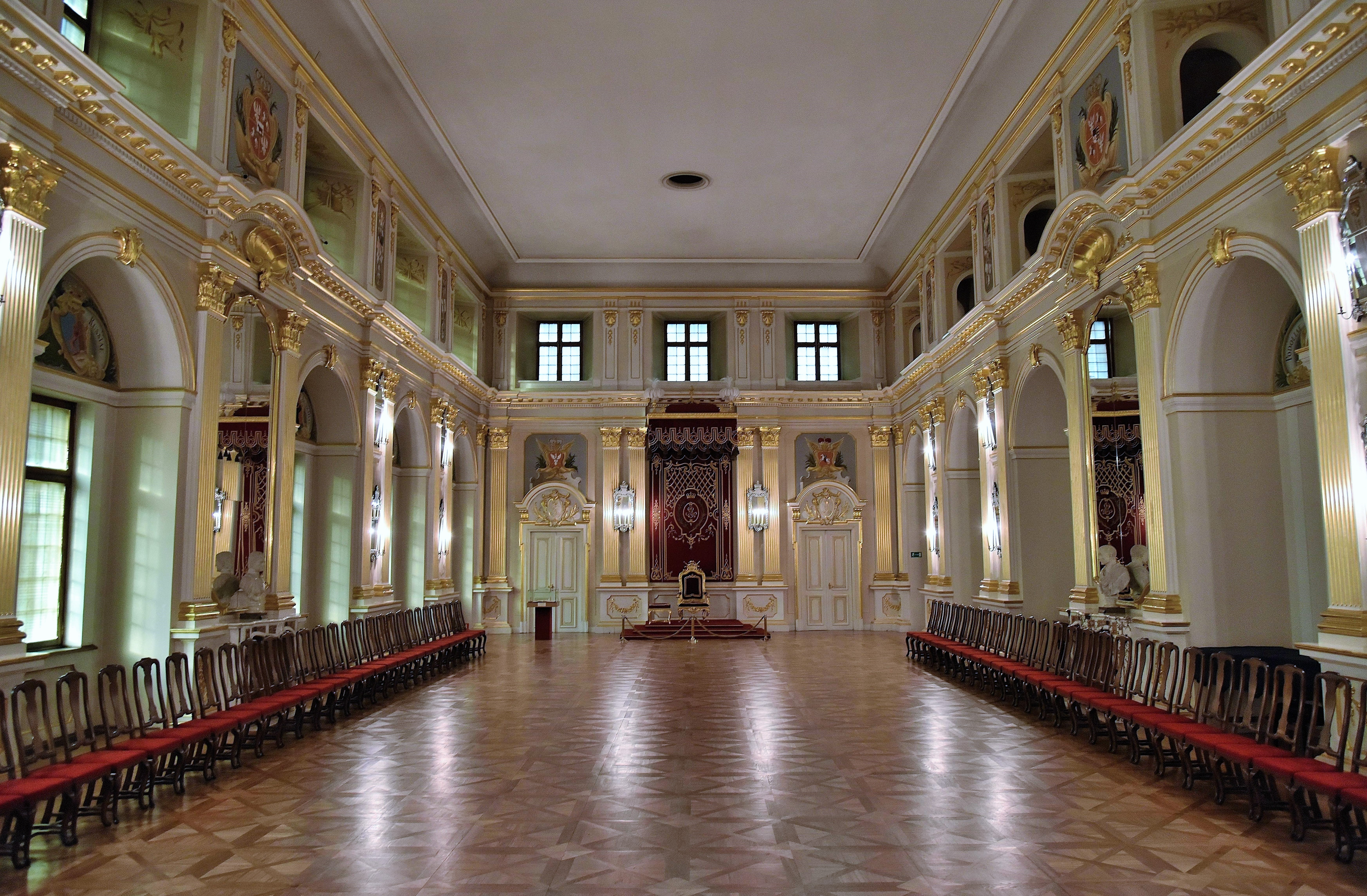
Royal Castle Senate Chamber, reconstructed after destruction in World War II

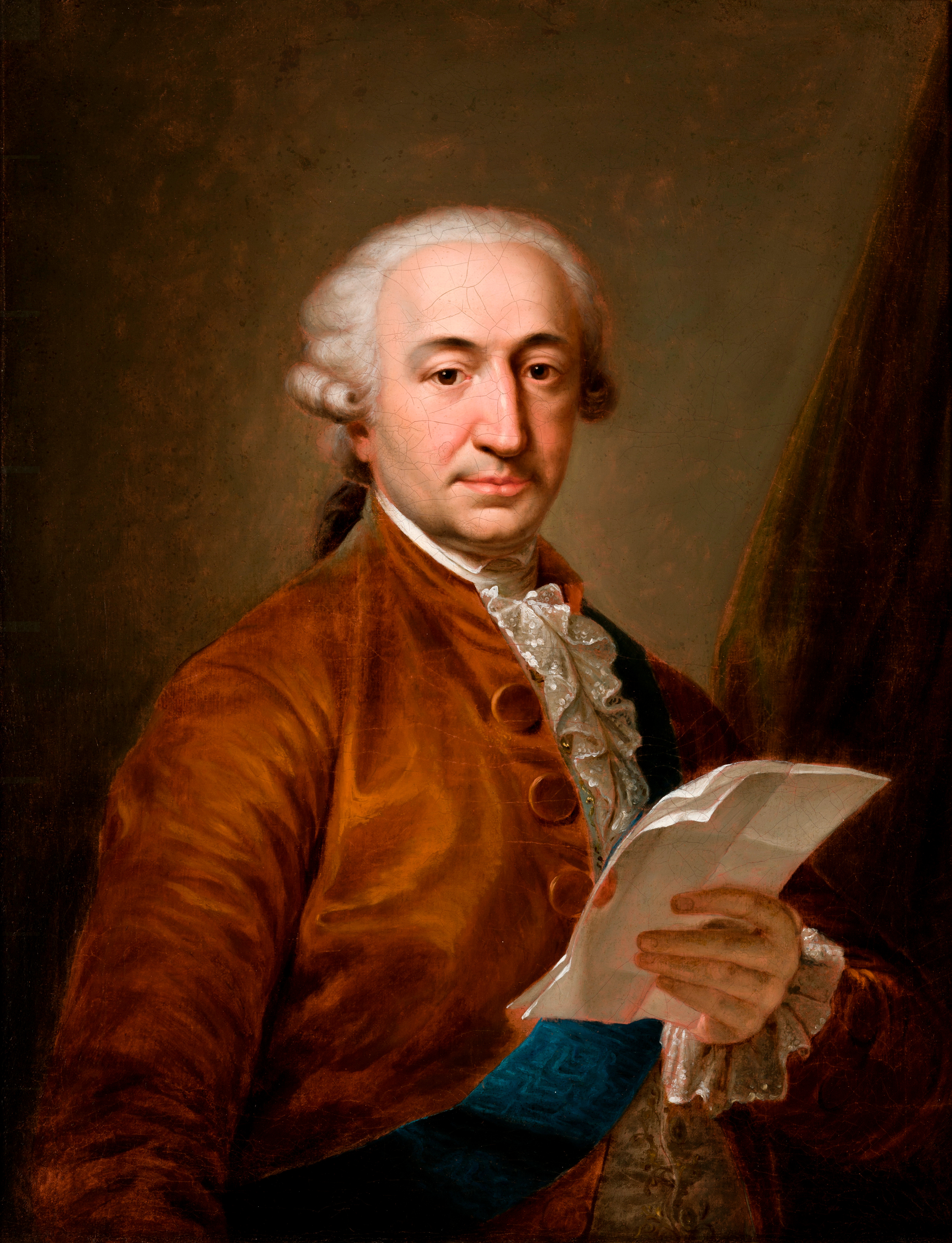
Małachowski

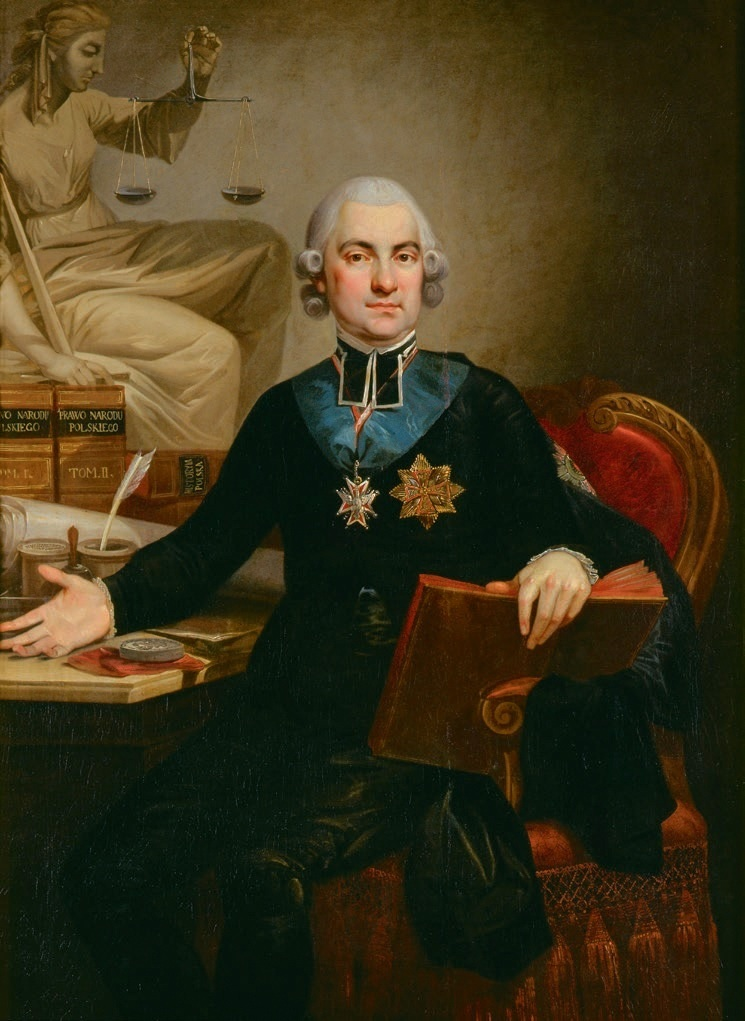
Kołłątaj

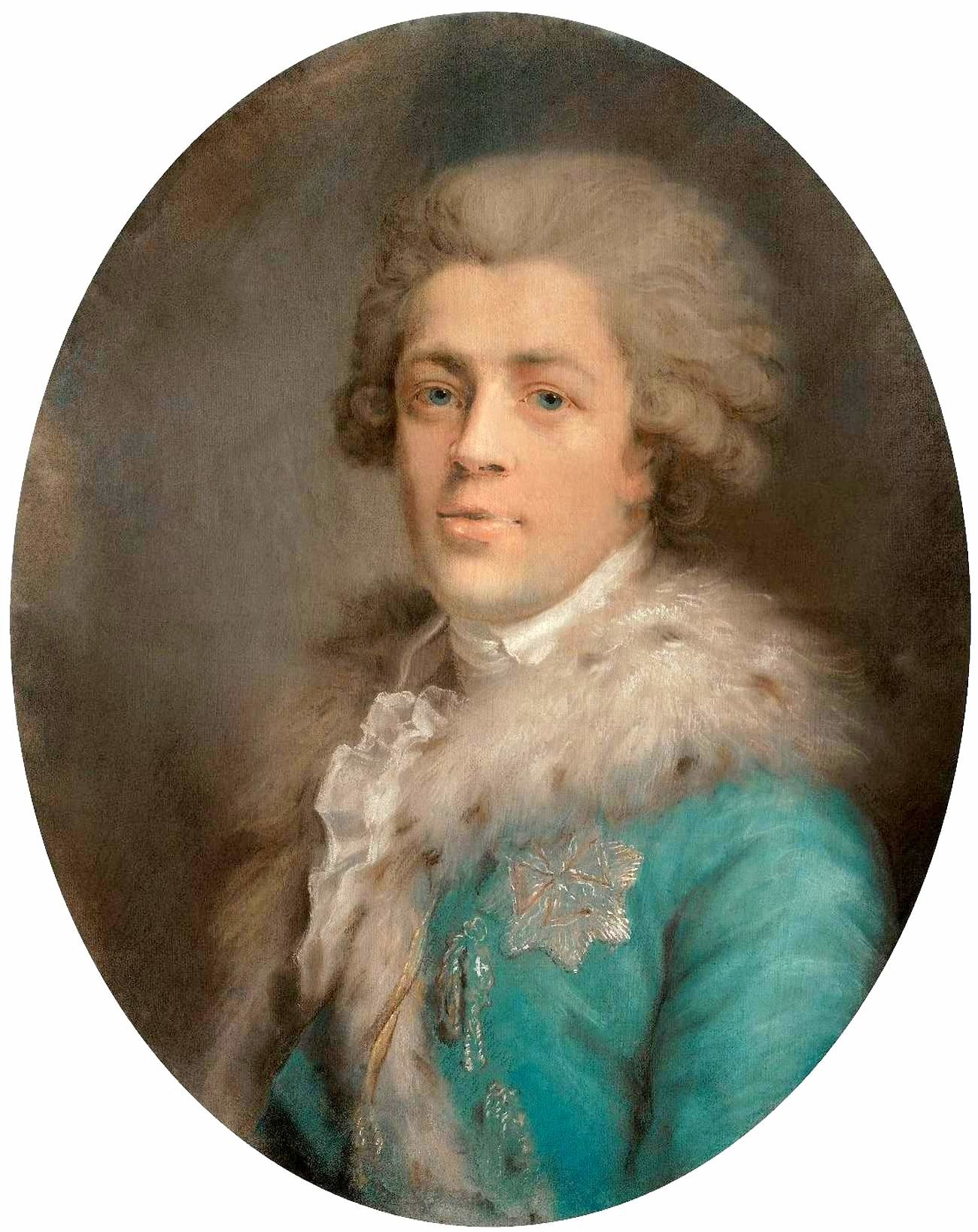
Potocki

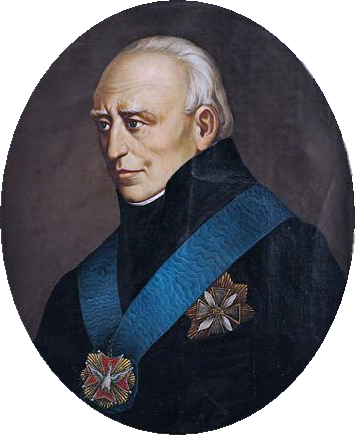
Staszic

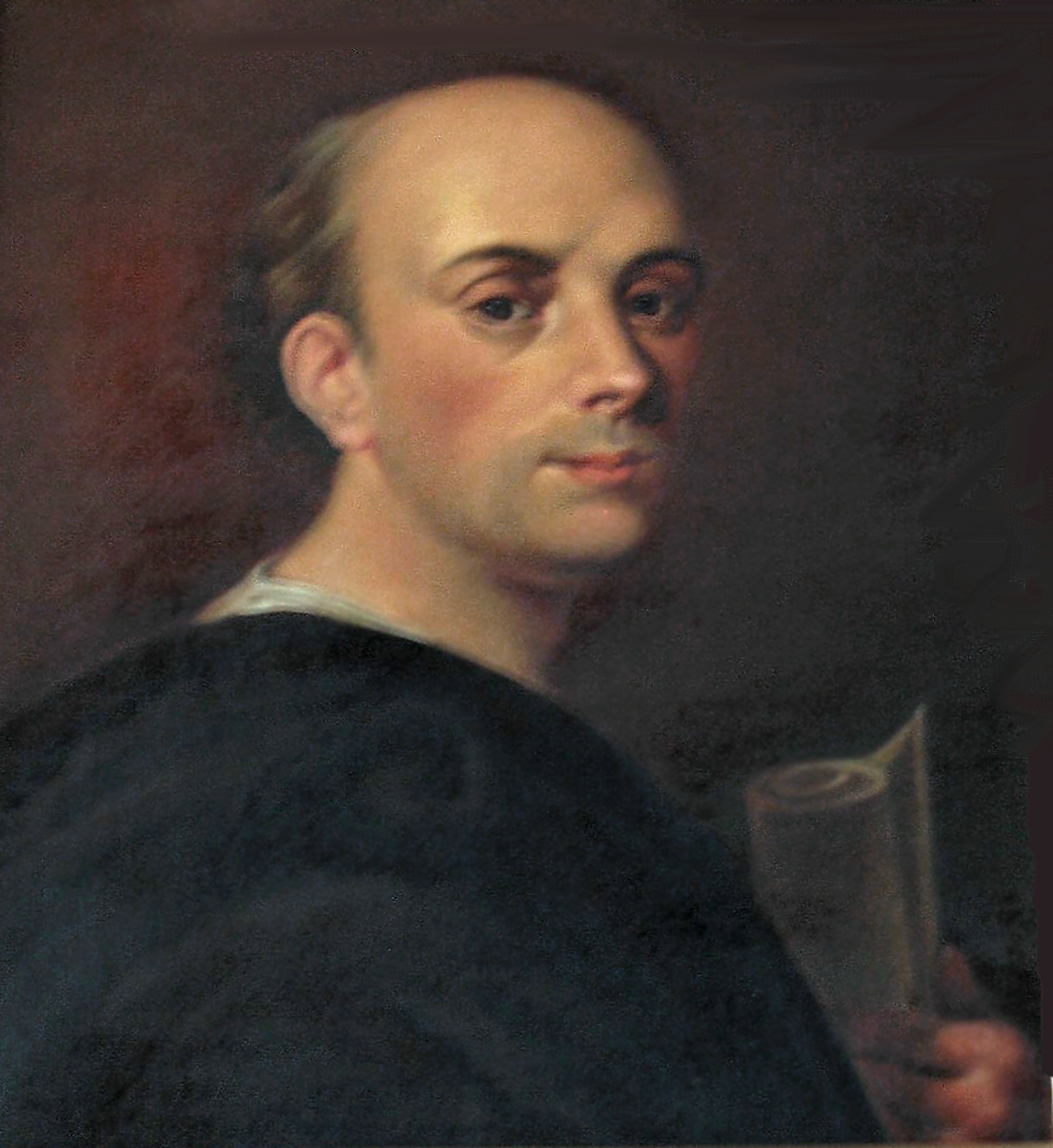
Piattoli

An opportunity for reform occurred during the "Great Sejm" — also called the "Four-Year Sejm" — of 1788–1792, which began on 6 October 1788 with 181 deputies. In accordance with the Constitution's preamble, from 1790 it met "in dual number" when 171 newly elected deputies joined the earlier-established Sejm. On its second day, the body became a confederated sejm to avoid the liberum veto. Concurrent world events appeared to have been opportune for the reformers. Russia and Austria were at war with the Ottoman Empire, and the Russians found themselves simultaneously fighting in the Russo-Swedish War, 1788–1790. A new alliance between the Polish–Lithuanian Commonwealth and Prussia seemed to provide security against Russian intervention, and King Stanisław August drew closer to leaders of the reform-minded Patriotic Party.

The Sejm passed a few major reforms in its first two years, but the subsequent two years brought more substantial changes. The Sejm adopted the 1791 Free Royal Cities Act, which was formally incorporated into the final constitution. This act addressed a number of matters related to the cities, crucially expanding burghers' (i.e., townspeople's) rights, including electoral rights. While the Sejm comprised representatives of the nobility and clergy, the reformers were supported by the burghers, who in late 1789 organized in Warsaw a "Black Procession" demanding full political enfranchisement of the bourgeoisie. On 18 April 1791 the Sejm — fearing that the burghers' protests, if ignored, could turn violent, as they had in France not long before — adopted the Free Royal Cities Act.

The new constitution was drafted by the King, with contributions from Ignacy Potocki, Hugo Kołłątaj and others. The King is credited with writing the general provisions and Kołłątaj with giving the document its final shape. Stanisław August wanted the Commonwealth to become a constitutional monarchy similar to that of Great Britain, with a strong central government based on a strong monarch. Potocki wanted the Sejm to be the strongest branch of government. Kołłątaj wanted a "gentle" revolution, carried out without violence, to enfranchise other social classes in addition to the nobility.

The proposed reforms were opposed by the conservatives, including the Hetmans' Party. Threatened with violence by their opponents, the advocates of the draft began the debate on the Government Act two days early, while many opposing deputies were away on Easter recess. The debate and subsequent adoption of the Government Act was executed as a quasi-coup d'état. No recall notices were sent to known opponents of reform, while many pro-reform deputies secretly returned early. The royal guard under the command of the King's nephew, Prince Józef Poniatowski, was positioned about the Royal Castle, where the Sejm was gathered, to prevent opponents from disrupting the proceedings. On 3 May, the Sejm convened with only 182 members, about half its "dual" number. The bill was read and overwhelmingly adopted, to the enthusiasm of the crowds outside. The majority of deputies of the Grand Duchy of Lithuania opposed the Polish Crown deputies aspirations to abolish the separateness of the Grand Duchy of Lithuania and the majority of Lithuanian deputies supported the adoption of the Constituon on a compromise that more sovereignty and rights will be granted to the Grand Duchy of Lithuania in the unitary state (this stance resulted in the later unanimous adoption of the Reciprocal Guarantee of Two Nations, an addendum to the Constitution). A protest was submitted the next day by a small group of deputies, but on 5 May the matter was officially concluded and protests were invalidated by the Constitutional Deputation of the Sejm. It was the first time in the 18th century that a constitutional act had been passed in the Commonwealth without the involvement of foreign powers.

Soon after, the Friends of the Constitution (Zgromadzenie Przyjaciół Konstytucji Rządowej) — which included many participants in the Great Sejm — was organised to defend the reforms already enacted and to promote further ones. It is now regarded as the first modern-style political party in Poland's history. The response to the new constitution was less enthusiastic in the provinces, where the Hetmans' Party enjoyed considerable influence. General support among the middle nobility was crucial and still very substantial; most of the provincial sejmiks deliberating in 1791 and early 1792 supported the constitution.

== Features ==
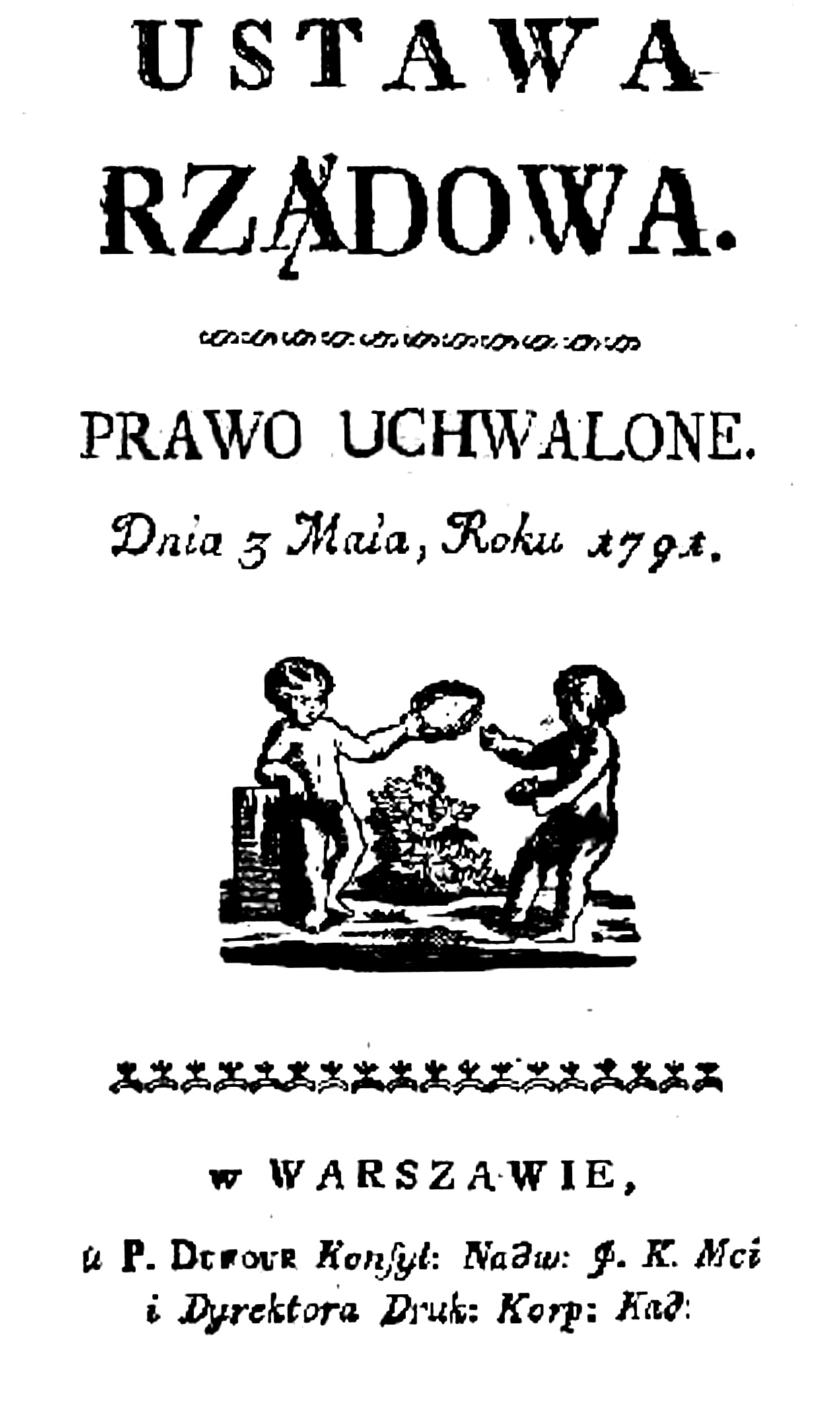
3 May Constitution, printed in Warsaw, 1791

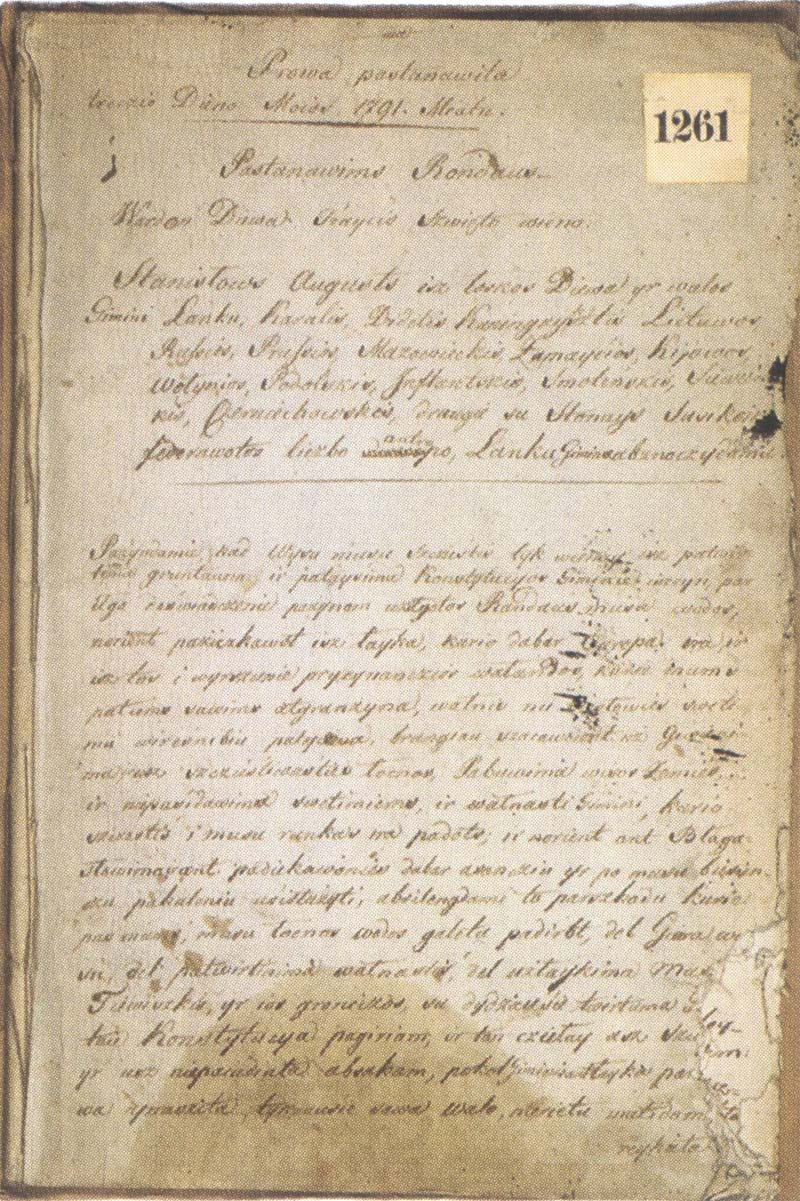
Manuscript of the 3 May Constitution in Lithuanian

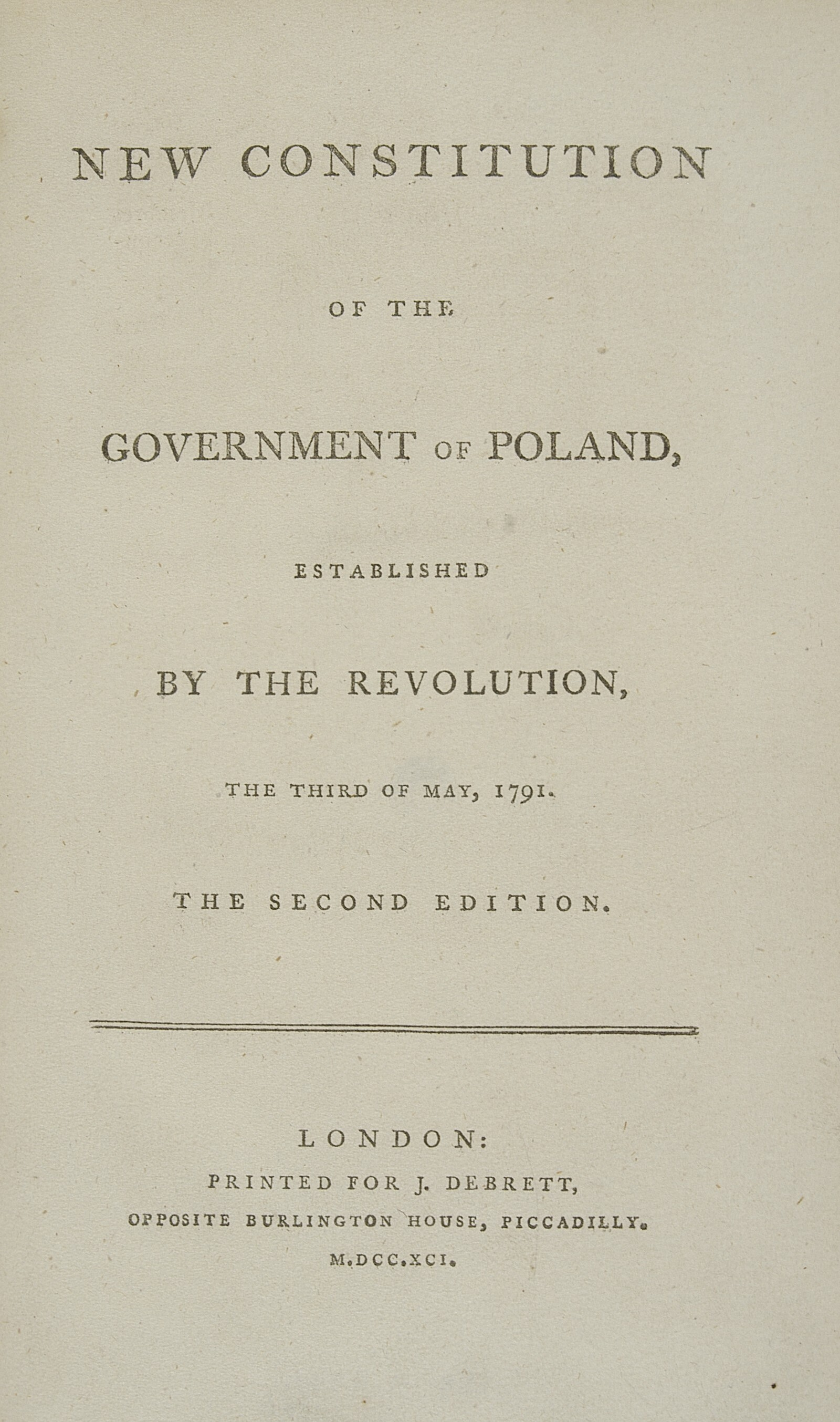
English edition, London, 1791

The Constitution of 3 May 1791 reflected Enlightenment influences, including Rousseau's concept of the social contract and Montesquieu's advocacy of a balance of powers among three branches of government — legislative, executive, and judicial — and of a bicameral legislature. As stated in Article V of the 3 May 1791 Constitution, the government was to ensure that "the integrity of the states, civil liberty, and social order shall always remain in equilibrium." Jacek Jędruch writes that the liberality of the 3 May 1791 Constitution's provisions "fell somewhere below [that of] the French Constitution of 1791, above [that of the Canadas'] Constitutional Act of 1791, and left the [1794] General State Laws for the Prussian States far behind, but did not equal [that of] the American Constitution [that went into force in 1789]." King Stanisław August Poniatowski was reported to have said that the 3 May 1791 Constitution was "founded principally on those of England and the United States of America, but avoiding the faults and errors of both, and adapted as much as possible to the local and particular circumstances of the country." However, Polish historians report the Constitution as having been described as "based mainly on the United States Constitution, but minus the latter's flaws, and adapted to Poland's circumstances." (Note: In the original Polish, opartą w głównej mierze na konstytucji Stanów Zjednoczonych, lecz bez błędów w niej zawartych, zaadaptowaną do warunków panuiących w Polszcze.) George Sanford writes that the Constitution of 3 May 1791 provided "a constitutional monarchy close to the English model of the time."

Article I acknowledged the Roman Catholic faith as the "dominant religion" but guaranteed tolerance and freedom to all religions. It was less progressive than the 16th century Warsaw Confederation, and placed Poland clearly within the Catholic sphere of influence. Article II confirmed many old privileges of the nobility, stressing that all nobles were equal and should enjoy personal security and the right to property. Article III stipulated that the earlier Free Royal Cities Act (Miasta Nasze Królewskie Wolne w Państwach Rzeczypospolitej), of 18 (or 21) April 1791, was integral to the Constitution. Personal security — neminem captivabimus, the Polish version of habeas corpus — was extended to townspeople (including Jews). Townspeople also gained the right to acquire landed property and became eligible for military officers' commissions and public offices, such as reserved seats in the Sejm and seats in the executive commissions of the Treasury, Police, and Judiciary. Membership in the nobility (szlachta) was also made easier for burghers to acquire.

With half a million burghers in the Commonwealth now substantially enfranchised, political power became more equally distributed. Little power was given to the less politically conscious or active classes, such as Jews and peasants. Article IV placed the Commonwealth's peasantry under the protection of the national law — a first step toward enfranchising the country's largest and most oppressed social class. Their low status compared to other classes was not eliminated, as the constitution did not abolish serfdom. (Note: The contemporaneous United States Constitution sanctioned the continuation of slavery. Thus, neither of the two constitutions enfranchised all its adult male population: the U.S. Constitution excluded the slaves; the Polish-Lithuanian Constitution excluded the peasants.) The Second Partition and Kościuszko's Proclamation of Połaniec in 1794 would later begin to abolish serfdom.

Article V stated that "all power in civil society [should be] derived from the will of the people". The constitution referred to the country's "citizens", which for the first time included townspeople and peasants. The document's preamble and 11 individual articles introduced the principle of popular sovereignty applied to the nobility and townspeople, and the separation of powers into legislative (a bicameral Sejm), executive ("the King and the Guardians", the Guardians of the Laws being the newly established top governmental entity) and judicial branches. It advanced the democratization of the polity by limiting the excessive legal immunities and political prerogatives of landless nobility.

Legislative power, as defined in Article VI, rested with the bicameral Sejm, made up of an elected Chamber of Deputies (Izba Poselska) as the lower house and an appointed Chamber of Senators (Izba Senacka) as the upper house. and the king. The Sejm met every two years, and when required by national emergency. The Chamber of Deputies had 204 deputies (2 from each powiat, 68 each from the provinces of Greater Poland, Lesser Poland and the Grand Duchy of Lithuania) and 21 plenipotentiaries from royal cities (7 from each province). The royal chancellery was to inform the sejmiks of the legislation it intended to propose in advance, so deputies could prepare for the discussions. The Senate had between 130 and 132 (sources vary) senators (voivodes, castellans, and bishops, as well as governments ministers without the right to vote). The king presided over the Senate and had one vote, which could be used to break ties. The king and all deputies had legislative initiative, and most matters — known as general laws, and divided into constitutional, civil, criminal, and those for the institution of perpetual taxes — required a simple majority, first from the lower chamber, then the upper. Specialized resolutions, including treaties of alliance, declarations of war and peace, ennoblements and increases in national debt, needed a majority of both chambers voting jointly. The Senate had a suspensive veto over laws that the Sejm passed, valid until the next Sejm session, when it could be overruled.

Article VI recognized the Prawo o sejmikach, the act on regional assemblies (sejmiks) passed on 24 March 1791. By reducing the enfranchisement of the noble classes, this law introduced major changes to the electoral ordinance. Previously, all nobles had been eligible to vote in sejmiks, which de facto meant that many of the poorest, landless nobles — known as "clients" or "clientele" of local magnates — voted as the magnates bade them. Now right to vote was tied to a property qualification: one had to own or lease land and pay taxes, or be closely related to somebody who did, to vote. 300,000 of 700,000 previously eligible nobles were thus disfranchised. Voting rights were restored to landowners in military service. They had lost these rights in 1775. Voting was limited to men aged at least 18. The eligible voters elected deputies to local powiats, or county sejmiks, which elected deputies to the General Sejm.

Finally, Article VI explicitly abolished several institutional sources of government weakness and national anarchy, including the liberum veto, confederations and confederated sejms, and the excessive influence of sejmiks stemming from the previously binding nature of their instructions to their Sejm deputies. The confederations were declared "contrary to the spirit of this constitution, subversive of government and destructive of society." Thus, the new constitution strengthened the powers of the Sejm, moving the country towards a constitutional monarchy.

Executive power, according to Article V and Article VII, was in the hands of "the King in his council", a cabinet of ministers that was called the Guardians of the Laws (or Guard of the Laws, Straż Praw). The ministries could not create or interpret laws, and all acts of the foreign ministry were provisional and subject to Sejm approval. The King presided over his council, which comprised the Roman Catholic Primate of Poland — who was also president of the Education Commission — and five ministers appointed by the King: a minister of police, a minister of the seal (internal affairs), a minister of foreign affairs, a minister belli (of war), and a minister of treasury. Council members also included — without a vote — the Crown Prince, the Marshal of the Sejm, and two secretaries. This royal council descended from similar councils that had functioned since King Henry's Articles (1573), and from the recent Permanent Council. Acts of the King required the countersignature of the pertinent minister. A minister was required to countersign a law, unless all other ministers endorsed his objection to that law. In that case, the King could withdraw the law or press the issue by presenting it to parliament. The stipulation that the King, "doing nothing of himself, [...] shall be answerable for nothing to the nation," parallels the British constitutional principle that "The King can do no wrong." (In both countries, the pertinent minister was responsible for the King's acts.) The ministers were responsible to the Sejm, which could dismiss them by a two-thirds vote of no confidence of both houses. Ministers could also be held accountable by the Sejm Court, where a simple-majority vote sufficed to impeach a minister. The King was the nation's commander-in-chief; there is no mention of hetmans (the previous highest-ranking military commanders). The King had the right to grant pardons, except in cases of treason. The royal council's decisions were implemented by commissions, whose members were elected by the Sejm.

The Constitution changed the government from an elective to a hereditary monarchy. This provision was intended to reduce the destructive influence of foreign powers at each election. (Note: Stanisław August had been elected in 1764 due to support from the Russian Tsarina Catherine the Great. Russia spent about 2.5 million rubles to support his election, and Poniatowski's supporters and opponents engaged in military posturing and even minor clashes. The Russian army was deployed a few miles from the election sejm, which met at Wola near Warsaw.) The royal dynasty was elective, and if one were to cease, a new family would be chosen by the nation. The king reigned by the "grace of God and the will of the Nation", and "all authority derives from the will of the Nation." The institution of pacta conventa was preserved. On Stanisław August's death the Polish throne would become hereditary and pass to Elector Frederick Augustus III of Saxony of the House of Wettin, which had provided the two kings who had preceded Stanisław August on the throne. This provision was contingent upon Frederick Augustus' consent. He declined when Adam Czartoryski offered him the throne. (Note: In 1807, Napoleon persuaded Frederick Augustus to become the king of the Duchy of Warsaw established by the French Emperor on lands of the former Commonwealth.)

Discussed in Article VIII, the judiciary was separated from the two other branches of the government, and was to be served by elective judges. Courts of first instance existed in each voivodeship and were in constant session, with judges elected by the regional sejmik assemblies. Appellate tribunals were established for the provinces, based on the reformed Crown Tribunal and Lithuanian Tribunal. The Sejm elected from its deputies the judges for the Sejm Court, a precursor to the modern State Tribunal of Poland. Referendary courts were established in each province to hear the cases of the peasantry. Municipal courts, described in the law on towns, complemented this system.

Article IX covered procedures for regency, which should be taken up jointly by the council of the Guardians, headed by the Queen, or in her absence by the Primate. Article X stressed the importance of the education of royal children and tasked the Commission of National Education with this responsibility. The last article of the constitution, Article XI, concerned the national standing army. Said army was defined as a "defensive force" dedicated "solely to the nation's defense." The army was to be increased in strength to 100,000 men.

To further enhance the Commonwealth's integration and security, the Constitution abolished the erstwhile union of Poland and Lithuania in favor of a unitary state. Its full establishment, supported by Stanisław August and Kołlątaj, was opposed by many Lithuanian deputies. As a compromise, the Grand Duchy of Lithuania received numerous privileges guaranteeing its continued existence. Related acts included the Declaration of the Assembled Estates (Deklaracja Stanów Zgromadzonych) of 5 May 1791, confirming the Government Act adopted two days earlier, and the Mutual Pledge of the Two Nations (Zaręczenie Wzajemne Obojga Narodów), i.e. of the Crown of the Kingdom of Poland and the Grand Duchy of Lithuania, of 22 October 1791, affirming the unity and indivisibility of Poland and Lithuania within a single state and their equal representation in state-governing bodies. The Mutual Pledge strengthened the Polish–Lithuanian union while keeping many federal aspects of the state intact.

The manuscript in the Lithuanian language of the Constitution was made and it was also later published in English-, French-, and German-language editions.

The Constitution provided for potential amendments, which were to be addressed at an extraordinary Sejm to be held every 25 years.

The Constitution remained to the last a work in progress. The Government Act was fleshed out in a number of laws passed in May and June 1791: on sejm courts (two acts of 13 May), the Guardians of the Laws (1 June), the national police commission (a ministry, 17 June), and municipal administration (24 June).

The Constitution's co-author Hugo Kołłątaj announced that work was underway on "an economic constitution [...] guaranteeing all rights of property [and] securing protection and honor to all manner of labor [...]" A third planned basic law was mentioned by Kołłątaj: a "moral constitution", most likely a Polish analog to the United States Bill of Rights and the French Declaration of the Rights of Man and of the Citizen. The Constitution called for the preparation of a new civil and criminal code, tentatively called the Stanisław August Code. The King also planned a reform improving the situation of the Jews.

== Aftermath: war and the final two Partitions ==
The constitutional formal procedures were performed for little over a year before being stopped by Russian armies allied with conservative Polish nobility in the Polish–Russian War of 1792, also known as the War in Defense of the Constitution. With the wars between Turkey and Russia and Sweden and Russia having ended, Empress Catherine was furious over the adoption of the document, which she believed threatened Russian influence in Poland. Russia had viewed Poland as a de facto protectorate. "The worst possible news have arrived from Warsaw: the Polish king has become almost sovereign" was the reaction of one of Russia's chief foreign policy authors, Alexander Bezborodko, when he learned of the new constitution. The contacts of Polish reformers with the Revolutionary French National Assembly were seen by Poland's neighbors as evidence of a revolutionary conspiracy and a threat to the absolute monarchies. The Prussian statesman Ewald von Hertzberg expressed the fears of European conservatives: "The Poles have given the coup de grâce to the Prussian monarchy by voting a constitution", elaborating that a strong Commonwealth would likely demand return of the lands that Prussia had acquired in the First Partition.

Magnates who had opposed the constitution draft from the start, Franciszek Ksawery Branicki, Stanisław Szczęsny Potocki, Seweryn Rzewuski, Szymon and Józef Kossakowski, asked Tsarina Catherine to intervene and restore their privileges — the Cardinal Laws abolished under the new statute. To that end these magnates formed the Targowica Confederation. The Confederation's proclamation, prepared in Saint Petersburg in January 1792, criticised the constitution for contributing to "contagion of democratic ideas" following "the fatal examples set in Paris." It asserted that "The parliament [...] has broken all fundamental laws, swept away all liberties of the gentry and on the third of May 1791 turned into a revolution and a conspiracy." The Confederates declared an intention to overcome this revolution. We "can do nothing but turn trustingly to Tsarina Catherine, a distinguished and fair empress, our neighboring friend and ally", who "respects the nation's need for well-being and always offers it a helping hand", they wrote.

Russian armies entered Poland and Lithuania, starting the Polish–Russian War of 1792. The Sejm voted to increase the army of the Commonwealth to 100,000 men, but owing to insufficient time and funds, this number was never achieved and soon abandoned even as a goal. The Polish King and the reformers could field only a 37,000 man army, many of them untested recruits. This army, under the command of Józef Poniatowski and Tadeusz Kościuszko, defeated or fought to a draw the Russians on several occasions, but in the end, a defeat loomed inevitable. Despite Polish requests, Prussia refused to honor its alliance obligations. Stanisław August's attempts at negotiations with Russia proved futile. As the front lines kept shifting to the west and in July 1792 Warsaw was threatened with siege by the Russians, the King came to believe that victory was impossible against the numerically superior enemy, and that surrender was the only alternative to total defeat. Having received assurances from the Russian ambassador Yakov Bulgakov that no territorial changes will occur, the Guardians of the Laws cabinet voted 8:4 to surrender. On 24 July 1792, King Stanisław August Poniatowski joined the Targowica Confederation, as the Empress had demanded. The Polish Army disintegrated.

Many reform leaders, believing their cause was for now lost, went into self-imposed exile. Some hoped that Stanisław August would be able to negotiate an acceptable compromise with the Russians, as he had done in the past. But the King had not saved the Commonwealth and neither had the Targowica Confederates, who governed the country for a short while. To their surprise, the Grodno Sejm, bribed or intimidated by the Russian troops, enacted the Second Partition of Poland. On 23 November 1793, it concluded its deliberations under duress, annulling the constitution and acceding to the Second Partition. Russia took 250,000 square kilometres (97,000 sq mi), while Prussia took 58,000 square kilometres (22,000 sq mi). The Commonwealth now comprised no more than 215,000 square kilometres (83,000 sq mi). What was left of the Commonwealth was merely a small buffer state with a puppet king, and Russian garrisons keeping an eye on the reduced Polish army.

For a year and a half, Polish patriots waited while planning an insurrection. On 24 March 1794 in Kraków, Tadeusz Kościuszko declared what has come to be known as the Kościuszko Uprising. On 7 May, he issued the Proclamation of Połaniec (Uniwersał Połaniecki), granting freedom to the peasants and ownership of land to all who fought in the insurrection. Revolutionary tribunals administered summary justice to those deemed traitors to the Commonwealth. After initial victories at the Battle of Racławice (4 April), the capture of Warsaw (18 April) and the Wilno (22 April) — the Uprising was crushed when the forces of Russia, Austria and Prussia joined in a military intervention. Historians consider the Uprising's defeat to have been a foregone conclusion in the face of the superiority in numbers and resources of the three invading powers. The defeat of Kościuszko's forces led in 1795 to the third and final partition of the Commonwealth.

== Legacy ==
=== Historic importance ===
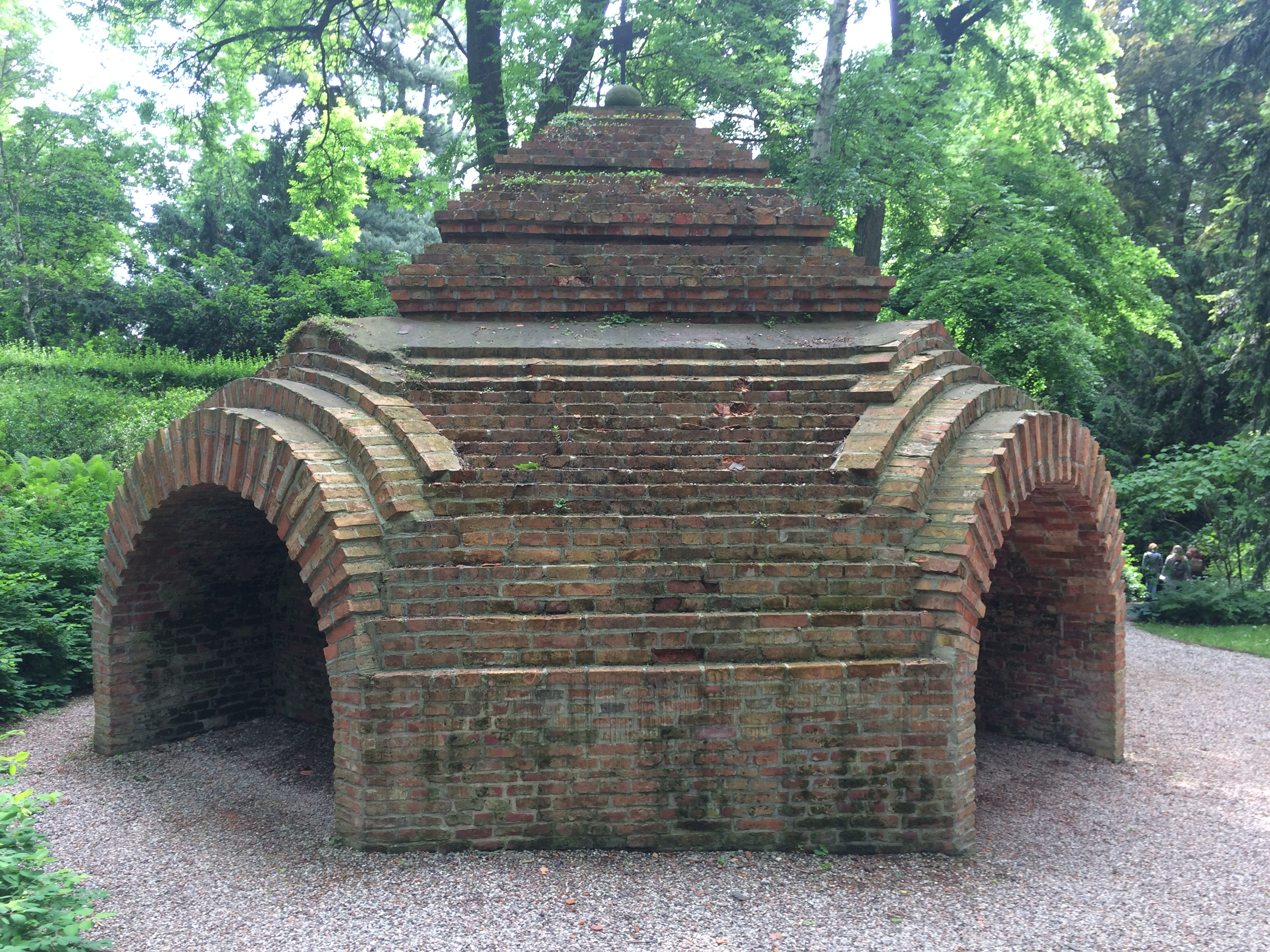
Ruined chapel containing cornerstone for Temple of Divine Providence, laid 3 May 1792 by King Stanisław August Poniatowski and his brother, the Catholic Primate of Poland Michał Jerzy Poniatowski, to commemorate the Constitution of 3 May 1791. Work on the Temple had only begun when Poland was invaded by the Russian Imperial Army. Chapel is now within the Warsaw University Botanical Garden.

The Constitution of 3 May 1791 has been both idealised and criticised for either not going far enough or being too radical. As its provisions remained in force for only 18 months and 3 weeks, its influence was, in any case, limited. However, for generations, the memory of the Constitution — recognised by political scientists as a progressive document for its time — helped keep alive Polish aspirations for an independent and just society, and continued to inform the efforts of its authors' descendants.

Bronisław Dembiński, a Polish constitutional scholar, wrote a century later that "The miracle of the Constitution did not save the state but did save the nation." In Poland, the Constitution is mythologized and viewed as a national symbol and as the culmination of the Enlightenment in Polish history and culture. In the words of two of its authors, Ignacy Potocki and Hugo Kołłątaj, it was "the last will and testament of the expiring Homeland." (Note: Piotr Machnikowski renders the Polish "Ojczyzna" as "Fatherland". The "literal" English translation of "ojczyzna" is indeed "fatherland": both these words are calques of the Latin "patria", which itself derives from the Latin "pater" ("father"). The English translation of the Constitution of 3 May 1791, by Christopher Kasparek, reproduced in Wikisource (e.g. at the end of section II, "The Landed Nobility") renders "ojczyzna" as "country", which is the usual English-language equivalent of the expression. In this particular context, "Homeland" may be the most natural rendering.) Since Poland's recovery of independence in 1918, the 3 May anniversary of the Constitution's adoption has been observed as the country's most important civil holiday.

The 3 May Constitution was a milestone in the history of law and in the growth of democracy. The 18th-century Irish statesman Edmund Burke described it as "the noblest benefit received by any nation at any time [...] Stanislas II has earned a place among the greatest kings and statesmen in history."

The 3 May Constitution was the first to follow the 1788 ratification of the United States Constitution. Poland and the United States, though geographically distant from each other, showed similar approaches to the designing of political systems.

The 3 May Constitution has been called the second constitution in world history. Constitutional-law expert Albert Blaustein calls it the "world's second national constitution", and Bill Moyers writes that it was "Europe's first codified national constitution (and the second oldest in the world)." Historian Norman Davies calls it "the first constitution of its type in Europe." (Note: The claims of "first" and "second constitution" have been disputed. The United States and Polish-Lithuanian constitutions had been preceded by earlier documents that did not completely separate the executive, legislative, and judiciary powers as Montesquieu discussed, such as the Instrument of Government of 1653 and the Articles of Confederation of 1777, both of which are well-known but lack the tripartite separation. Neither did the short-lived and little-known Corsican Constitution of 1755 clearly separate the executive from the judiciary. See history of the constitution.)

The 3 May Constitution and the Great Sejm that adopted it have been the subjects of a large body of works by Polish scholars, starting with the still often cited 19th-century works of Walerian Kalinka and Władysław Smoleński, and continued in the 20th century by Bogusław Leśnodorski.

The document's official name was Ustawa Rządowa ("Government Act"), where "government" referred to the political system. In the Commonwealth, the term "constitution" (Polish: konstytucja) had previously denoted all the legislation, of whatever character, that had been passed by a given Sejm.

Economist and philosopher Karl Marx praised the constitution, writing that:

With all its faults, this constitution seems to be the only act of freedom which Eastern Europe has undertaken in the midst of Prussian, Russian and Austrian barbarism. It was, moreover, initiated exclusively by the privileged classes, the nobility. The history of the world knows no other example of similar noble conduct by the nobility.

— Karl Marx, 1863,

=== Holiday ===
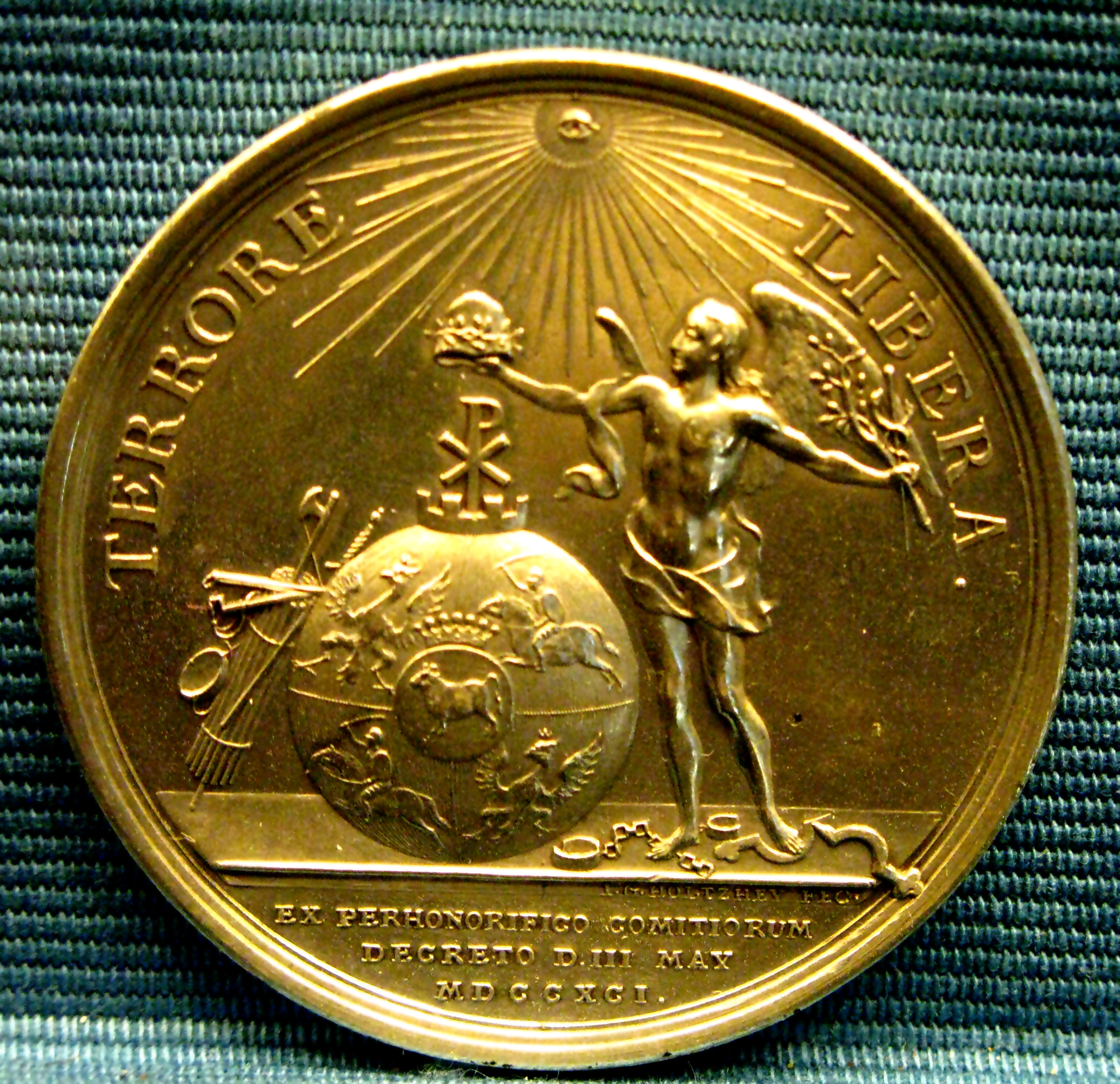
Medal commemorating the Constitution of 3 May 1791, issued that year

3 May was declared a Polish holiday (Constitution Day — Święto Konstytucji 3 Maja) on 5 May 1791. The holiday was banned during the partitions of Poland but reinstated in April 1919 under the Second Polish Republic — the first holiday officially introduced in the newly independent country.

It was again outlawed during World War II by both the Nazi and Soviet occupiers. It was celebrated in Polish cities in May 1945, although in a mostly spontaneous manner. The 1946 anti-communist demonstrations did not endear it to the Polish communists, and it competed for attention with the communist-endorsed 1 May Labor Day celebrations in the Polish People's Republic; this led to its "rebranding" as Democratic Party Day and removal from the list of national holidays by 1951. Until 1989, 3 May was a frequent occasion for anti-government and anti-communist protests.

3 May was restored as an official Polish holiday in April 1990 after the fall of communism. Polish-American pride has been celebrated on the same date, for instance in San Francisco; and in Chicago, where, since 1982, Poles have marked it with festivities and the annual Polish Constitution Day Parade.
