= Greater Poland Province, Crown of the Kingdom of Poland =

Administrative division of Poland

Greater Poland Province Polish: Prowincja wielkopolska
- Province of Poland
- 1569–1795
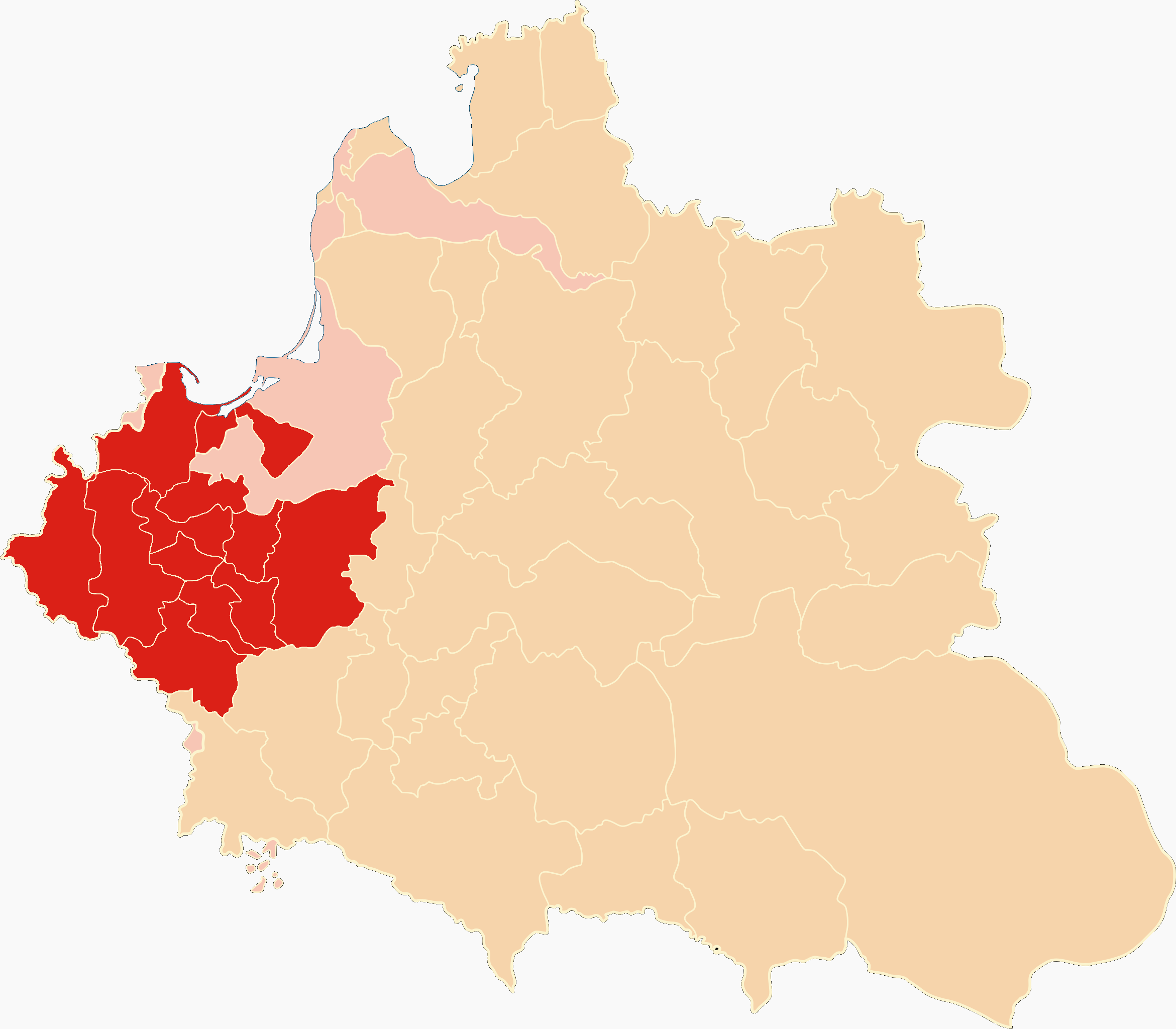
- Location of the province within the Polish–Lithuanian Commonwealth
- Capital: Poznań
- History
  - Established: 1569
  - Third Partition of Poland: 1795
- Political subdivisions: 13 voivodeships and one duchy
- Today part of: Poland; Russia¹
- ¹Small portion of the Vistula Spit around Polski

Greater Poland Province (Polish: Prowincja Wielkopolska) was an administrative division of the Crown of the Kingdom of Poland from 1569 until 1795. The name of the province comes from the historic land of Greater Poland.

The Greater Poland Province consisted initially of twelve voivodeships (after 1768 thirteen voivodeships) and one duchy:

1. Brześć Kujawski Voivodeship
2. Chełmno Voivodeship
3. Gniezno Voivodeship, est. in 1768
4. Inowrocław Voivodeship
5. Kalisz Voivodeship
6. Łęczyca Voivodeship
7. Malbork Voivodeship
8. Masovian Voivodeship
9. Płock Voivodeship
10. Pomeranian Voivodeship
11. Poznań Voivodeship
12. Rawa Voivodeship
13. Sieradz Voivodeship
14. Prince-Bishopric of Warmia

The location of the Crown Tribunal for the Greater Poland Province (the highest appeal court of the province) was Piotrków Trybunalski, and after the Convocation Sejm (1764) also Poznań and Bydgoszcz.

== Cities ==
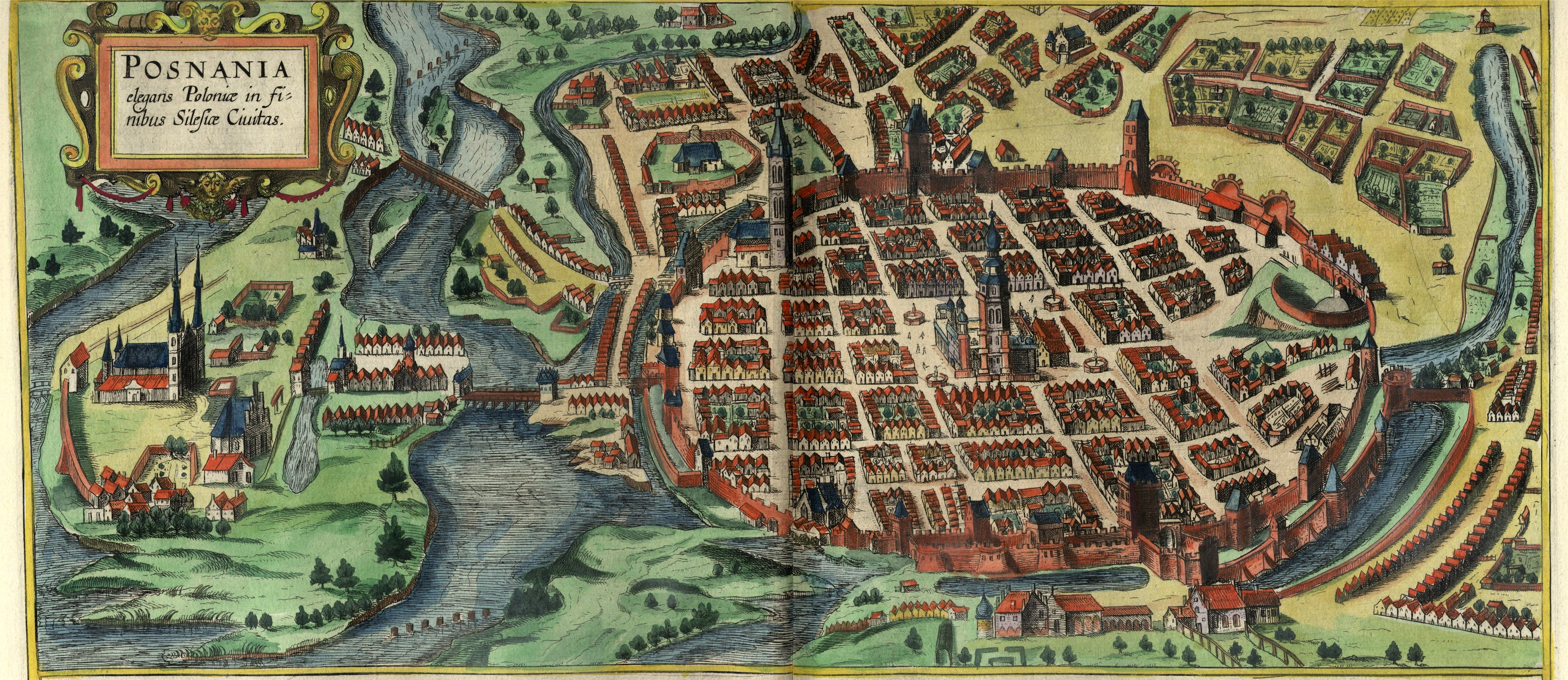
Poznań, the capital of the province, in the 17th century

The five most influential cities, i.e. Warsaw, Poznań, Gdańsk, Toruń and Elbląg, enjoyed voting rights during the royal elections.
