= Mexican standoff =

Type of confrontation

A Mexican standoff is a confrontation where no strategy exists that allows any party to achieve victory. Anyone initiating aggression might trigger their own demise. At the same time, the parties are unable to extract themselves from the situation without either negotiating a truce or suffering a loss, maintaining strategic tension until one of those three potential organic outcomes occurs or some outside force intervenes.

The term Mexican standoff was originally used in the context of using firearms and it still commonly implies a situation in which the parties face some form of threat from one another; the standoffs can span from someone holding a phone threatening to call the police being held in check by a blackmailer, to global confrontations.

The Mexican standoff as an armed stalemate is a recurring cinematic trope.

== Etymology ==
Sources claim the reference is to the Mexican–American War or post-war Mexican bandits in the 19th century.

The earliest known use of the phrase in print was on 19 March 1876, in a short story about Mexico, featuring the line:

"Go-!" said he sternly then. "We will call it a stand-off, a Mexican stand-off, you lose your money, but you save your life!"

— F. Harvey Smith, Sunday Mercury, New York, 1876

== Popular culture ==
In popular culture, the term Mexican standoff references confrontations in which neither opponent appears to have a measurable advantage. Historically, commentators have used the term to reference the Soviet Union – United States nuclear confrontation during the Cold War, specifically the Cuban Missile Crisis of 1962. The key element that makes such situations Mexican standoffs is the perceived equality of power exercised amongst the involved parties. The inability of any particular party to advance its position safely is a condition common amongst all standoffs; in a "Mexican standoff", however, there is an additional disadvantage: no party has a safe way to withdraw from its position, thus making the standoff effectively permanent.

The cliché of a Mexican standoff where each party is threatening another with a gun is now considered a movie trope, stemming from its frequent use as a plot device in cinema. A notable example is in Sergio Leone's 1966 Western The Good, the Bad and the Ugly, where the characters played by Clint Eastwood, Lee Van Cleef and Eli Wallach, face each other in a showdown.

Director John Woo, considered a major influence on the action film genre, is known for his use of the "Mexican standoff" trope. Director Quentin Tarantino (who has cited Woo as an influence) has featured Mexican standoff scenes in films including Inglourious Basterds (the tavern scene features multiple Mexican standoffs including meta-discussion) and Reservoir Dogs, True Romance and Pulp Fiction, which depicts a standoff among four characters in the climactic scene.

An example of the Mexican standoff which is not in an action film is the finale of the 1995 French film La Haine.

== See also ==
- Catch-22 (logic)
- Deadlock
- Mutual assured destruction
- Pareto efficiency/Pareto optimality
- Polish parliament (expression)
- Prisoner's dilemma
- Russian roulette
- Stalemate
- Truel
- Zugzwang
