= Stanisław Dunin-Karwicki =

- Coat of arms: Łabędź
- Born: 1639 or 1640
- Died: 1724 or 1725
- Noble family: Karwicki-Dunin

Stanisław Dunin-Karwicki (c. 1640 – c. 1725), also known as Stanisław Karwicki-Dunin or Stanisław Karwicki, of the Łabędź coat of arms, was a Polish noble, politician, and political writer. He held the titles of Cześnik from 1688 and podkomorzy of Sandomierz from 1713 or 1714. He was involved with the Polish Reformed Church and was deputy to several Sejms. He authored the reformist treatise De ordinanda Republica seu de corrigendis defectibus in statu Republicae Polonae.

== Biography ==
He was born in 1639 or 1640 (sources vary, with no explanation given), and owned several villages near Stopnica and Opatów. Little is known about his youth, including the specifics of his education. He traveled through Germany, Italy, and possibly France. He held the titles of Cześnik from 1688 and podkomorzy of Sandomierz from 1713 or 1714 to 1724. In Sandomierz, he held some various smaller, official positions, including judiciary ones. Władysław Konopczyński suggests that he was very involved in local matters, and cared about them more than the national honors and offices; thus he never attempted to become a member of the Senate of Poland.

He was deputy to several Sejms, starting with the Sejm in 1674. He did not attend all Sejms, as he professed a belief in the not-always respected rule that one should not attend more than every third Sejm. He attended the Sejm in 1688, where he was remembered for vocal if futile opposition to liberum veto. Another Sejm he attended was that of 1703. Near the end of his political career, he also attended the Sejms in 1712 and 1713.

He opposed Michał Korybut Wiśniowiecki and supported Jan III Sobieski. After Sobieski's death, he supported the election of his son, James Louis Sobieski, and then, Augustus II of Poland (as he promised significant reforms). He joined the Sandomierz Confederation in 1704 and was one of its leaders (konsyliarz). He took part in the Warsaw Congress in 1710.

His treatise De ordinanda Republica seu de corrigendis defectibus in statu Republicae Polonae, likely written in the period 1704-1710, advocated the need to reform the political system of the Polish–Lithuanian Commonwealth. It was not printed until 1871; according to Konopczyński, it was likely too controversial in its time. Some of Dunin-Karwicki's most controversial notions to his contemporaries were about the need to weaken the royal prerogatives, and the argument that landless nobles should have no vote, as they are easily bribed or influenced by wealthy magnates.

Jacek Jędruch described it as the "harbinger of the reform movement of the eighteenth century in the [Polish] political sphere", and others have expressed similar views. The treatise has been praised by few contemporaries (such as voivode of Sandomierz, Stanisław Morsztyn, bishop of Kraków Kazimierz Łubieński, and Stanisław Konarski) and later in the 19th century by the Stańczycy faction. Dunin-Karwicki was not very popular in the Great Sejm period, as for the reformers, his criticism of the liberum veto would not go far enough, and his arguments for weakening the royal power would not be shared by many who desired to strengthen it. He proposed numerous fixes to the Sejm. In a larger picture, he argued for the need of taxation of nobility in order to provide for a permanent army, limiting the king's power to distribute offices, limiting the liberum veto, and increasing the frequency of the Sejms. He noted that the governance should stem from the nation (nobility), and he has been criticized for not seeing the need to enfranchise other classes, such as the townspeople or the peasants.

He was a colleague of Stefan Bidziński.

His date of death is uncertain. In October 1724 a new podkomorzy of Sandomierz was appointed, which may indicate his death; but Konopczyński in his later works notes that this is not certain, and some documents note his death in 1725. Thus Konopczyński believes it is possible that Dunin-Karwicki have simply resigned his office in 1724, and died only in 1725.
