= Reciprocal Guarantee of Two Nations =

Document specifying the nature of the Polish–Lithuanian union

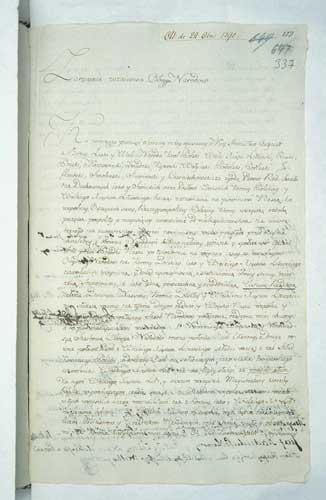
Original manuscript of the Mutual Pledge of the Two Nations

The Reciprocal Guarantee of Two Nations (Polish: Zaręczenie Wzajemne Obojga Narodów), also Reciprocal Warranty of Two Nations, Mutual Pledge of the Two Nations (Lithuanian: Abiejų Tautų tarpusavio įžadas) and Mutual Assurance of the Two Nations, was an addendum, adopted on 20 October 1791 by the Great Sejm, to the Polish-Lithuanian Constitution of 3 May 1791. In the preamble of this guarantee the dualistic form of the state was confirmed and it had equal status to the Union of Lublin (1569).

The Mutual Assurance of the Two Nations stated implementing principles that had not been spelled out in the Constitution. The document specified the nature of the Polish–Lithuanian union and affirmed "the unity and indivisibility", within a single state, of the Crown of the Kingdom of Poland and the Grand Duchy of Lithuania.

== Terms ==
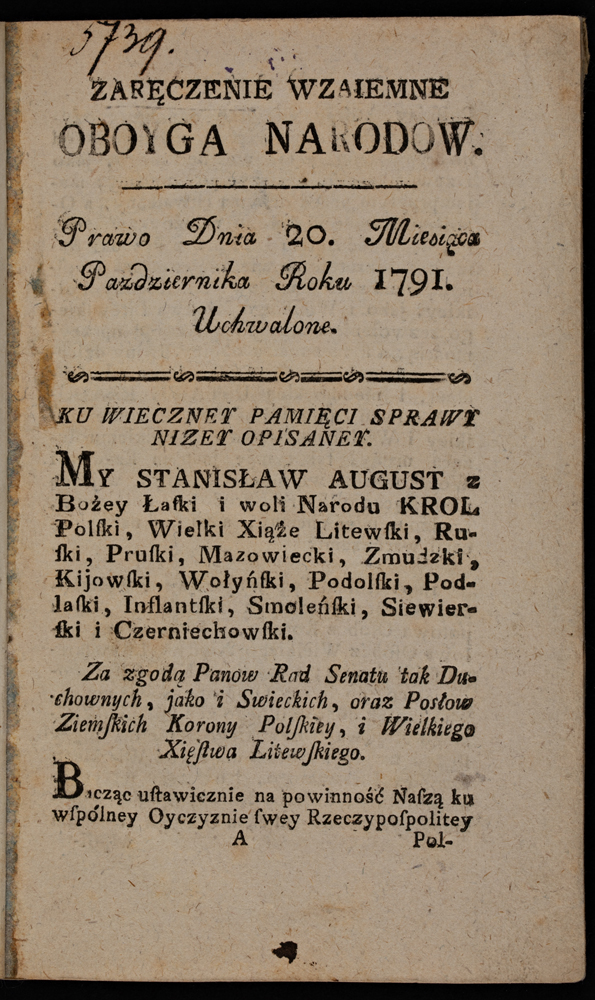
The document which distinguishes Poles, Lithuanians, Ruthenians, and others

The document was to be an integral part of the pacta conventa and thus binding on King Stanisław August Poniatowski and all subsequent monarchs of the Polish-Lithuanian state.

The document defined the federal character of the state and asserted the equal representation within the bodies of state governance of its two constituents (the Crown of the Kingdom of Poland and the Grand Duchy of Lithuania).

The document declared that the Polish–Lithuanian Commonwealth (now to be known as Rzeczpospolita Polska, the Polish Republic, or Polish Commonwealth) remained a union of the Crown of the Kingdom of Poland and the Grand Duchy of Lithuania. It specified that they shared a common government, military and treasury, but Lithuanian tax revenues were to be spent only within the Grand Duchy of Lithuania.

The military and treasury commissions were to have equal numbers of Polish and Lithuanian members and were to be presided over by Polish and Lithuanian officials on an alternating basis. The membership of the Police Commission was to be two-thirds Polish-Crown and one-third Lithuanian.

Poland and Lithuania were to have the same numbers of principal officials.

In the view of historians Stanisław Kutrzeba, Oskar Halecki and Bogusław Leśnodorski, the legislation adopted by the Four-Year Sejm, including the Mutual Pledge of the Two Nations, replaced the erstwhile union of the Crown of the Kingdom of Poland and the Grand Duchy of Lithuania, which had existed since the Union of Lublin (1569), with a unitary Polish Commonwealth, or Polish Republic.
