= Truel =

Three-way duel

Truel and triel are neologisms for a duel between three opponents, in which players can fire at one another in an attempt to eliminate them while surviving themselves.

== Game theory overview ==
A variety of forms of truels have been studied in game theory. Features that determine the nature of a truel include

- the probability of each player hitting their chosen targets (often not assumed to be the same for each player)
- whether the players shoot simultaneously or sequentially, and, if sequentially, whether the shooting order is predetermined, or determined at random from among the survivors;
- the number of bullets each player has (in particular, whether this is finite or infinite);
- whether or not intentionally missing is allowed.
- whether or not self-targeting or random selection of targets is allowed.

There is usually a general assumption that each player in the truel wants to be the only survivor, and will behave logically in a manner that maximizes the probability of this. (If each player only wishes to survive and does not mind if the others also survive, then the rational strategy for all three players can be to miss every time.)

In the widely studied form, the three have different probabilities of hitting their target.

If a single bullet is used, the probabilities of hitting the target are equal and deliberate missing is allowed, the best strategy for the first shooter is to deliberately miss. Since he is now disarmed, the next shooter will have no reason to shoot the first one and so will shoot at the third shooter. While the second shooter might miss deliberately, there would then be the risk that the third one would shoot him. If the first shooter does not deliberately miss, he will presumably be shot by whichever shooter remained.

If an unlimited number of bullets are used, then deliberate missing may be the best strategy for a duelist with lower accuracy than both opponents. If both have better than 50% success rate, he should continue to miss until one of his opponents kills the other. Then he will get the first shot at the remaining opponent. But if the "middle" opponent is weak, it can be better to team up with him until the strongest is eliminated. The details depend on the firing order. For example, if the order is P, Q, R, with respective probabilities

$$p > q > r\,$$

and it is R's turn, R should waste his shot if:

$$p < \frac{q (1 + q)}{1 - q + q^2}$$

but not do so if:

$$(1 - q)(1 - q + q^2)p^2 - q(1 - q)(1 + 2q)p - q^3 > 0\,$$

In between, R should waste his shot if:

$$r > \frac{p(p - q - pq - q^2 + pq^2)}{p^2(1 - q) + q^2(1 - p)^2}$$

== History ==
Frederick Marryat describes a three-way duel in his novel Mr. Midshipman Easy, published in 1836. This duel is more of a circular affair, with the first participant aiming only for the second, the second participant aiming only for the third, and the third participant aiming only at the first.

A later mention of three-person "duels" is A. P. Herbert's play Fat King Melon (1927). An extensive bibliography has been compiled by D. Marc Kilgour. The word "truel" was introduced in Martin Shubik's 1964 book Game Theory and Related Approaches to Social Behavior, page 43, and independently in Richard Epstein's 1967 book Theory of Gambling and Statistical Logic, page 343.

== In popular culture ==
In one of the most famous spaghetti westerns, The Good, the Bad and the Ugly, the final showdown is played out to be a climactic truel among the three main characters: Blondie ("The Good"), Angel Eyes ("The Bad"), and Tuco ("The Ugly"). The standoff remains a signature piece for director Sergio Leone and one of the best-known scenes in film history.

The climactic ending to the 1987 film City on Fire features a truel which is interrupted by the arrival of police. The 1992 film Reservoir Dogs has a very similar confrontation among the characters Mr. White, Nice Guy Eddie, and Joe Cabot, in which only one survives.

The truel is also parodied at the climax of the film The Good, the Bad, the Weird.

A truel with swords is fought among Jack Sparrow, Will Turner, and James Norrington in the 2006 film Pirates of the Caribbean: Dead Man's Chest; all three characters survive.

The short film Truel explores the idea of a three-way duel.

In the novel and movie A Dog's Will, a truel is one of João Grilo's plans.

In an episode of the hit show The Office, Michael convinces everyone to play a board game similar to Clue. The episode ends with Michael, Andy, Dwight and Pam in a finger truel.

The film Tekken Blood Vengeance also features a truel during the climax where Jin Kazama, Kazuya Mishima and Heihachi Mishima fought each other in a three-way duel.

== See also ==
- Mexican standoff
