= Kazimierz Karwowski =

Polish noble and politician

- Coat of arms: Pniejnia
- Born: c. 1670
- Died: 12 May 1746
- Noble family: Karwowski
- Father: Wojciech Karwowski
- Mother: Aleksandra Ciszewska

Kazimierz Karwowski (c. 1670 – 12 May 1746) of Pniejnia was a Polish noble and politician. He was marshal of the Sejm in 1740, a deputy to the Crown Tribunal, cześnik of Wizna from 1703, stolnik, łowczy and pisarz of Bielsk, podstarości, podstoli and sędzia grodzki (judge) of Brańsk. He is best known as an advocate of reform, and as a deputy elected to the Sejm (parliament) of the Polish–Lithuanian Commonwealth a record number of times over his four decades as a Sejm deputy.

== Biography ==
He was the firth son of Wojciech Karwowski and Aleksandra Ciszewska. He was married to Regina Sopockowna. They had three sons, Paweł Karwowski.

He was well educated and versed in law, history and languages. Combined with his renowned command of the Latin language, he was known as Civis et consul Polonus.

He was first elected as a Sejm deputy in 1701. During the Great Northern War he was loyal to Augustus II of Poland, and was member of the negotiations in Toruń (November 1702) and Malbork (March–May 1703). In the subsequent years he was elected as a deputy to Sejm at least 27 times, which is a record number in the history of the Polish–Lithuanian Commonwealth. He was known as a good speaker and debater.

In 1710 he participated in the General Council of Warsaw and joined the Sandomierz Confederation. In 1714 he was elected as one of the judges in the Crown Tribunal. The following year, he received the judge office in Brańsk.

On the political scene, he was aligned with the magnate family of Sapiehas as well as with Jan Klemens Branicki. He was involved in numerous legislation attempts, and repeatedly advocated reforms of Sejm procedures. Most notably, he advocated limitations of the use of the procedure of liberum veto: the right for parliament members to veto the entire legislative session, which is now seen as disastrous, but in his era was a nearly sacrosanct part of the Golden Freedom of the Commonwealth nobility. To bypass the Sejms dissolved in 1729, 1730 and 1732 he argued that a confederated sejm should be convened. He was also involved in the legislation forming the first permanent salaries for the Sejm deputies, reforming taxation, army's budget, and fleshing out the legislation of the Crown Tribunal. During his last Sejm of 1740 he was elected the Sejm Marshal; that sejm was one of many that was eventually disrupted by the liberum veto.

== Notes ==
- Jędruch is not consistent with regards to the number of times Karwowski was elected. On p. 154, he states "no less than 26 times", yet on p. 194, he states "no less than 27 times". Niesiecki and Bobrowicz cite 27 times.
