= Sejm of 1611 =

The Sejm of 1611 was a meeting of the parliament of the Polish–Lithuanian Commonwealth, which took place in Warsaw between September 26 and November 9, 1611. It was called to analyze the ongoing war with Russia (see Polish–Muscovite War (1605–18)), and the recapture of the city of Smolensk (see Siege of Smolensk (1609–11)). Marshal of the Sejm was an official from Lwow, Jan Swoszowski.

During the session, King Sigismund III Vasa tried to promote a bill which introduced conscription, and to persuade the envoys that the war with Russia should be continued. The Sejm ordered extra taxes, but this was not enough to finance military effort of the Commonwealth: also, the king appropriated some of the tax money, to cover the cost of Siege of Smolensk, for which he paid with his private funds. No money was sent to the Commonwealth garrison stationed in the Moscow Kremlin.

On October 16, a Russian delegation came to Warsaw, asking the Sejm to immediately send Duke Wladyslaw to Moscow. On October 29, Crown Hetman Stanislaw Zolkiewski made a triumphant entry into Warsaw, marching along Krakowskie Przedmiescie to the Royal Castle. Zolkiewski led with him Tsar Vasili IV of Russia, his brothers Dmitry and Ivan, as well as Russian military commander Mikhail Shein and Patriarch Philaret of Moscow. Zolkiewski gave a speech and then presented the Russian officials to the Polish Senate.
