= Polish parliament (expression) =

Political Expression

"Polish parliament" is an expression referring to the historical Polish parliaments (sejm walny). It implies chaos, disorder and indecision, particularly in a deliberative meeting. The term originates from the Swedish Polsk riksdag and German Polnischer Reichstag, and exists in the languages of many Scandinavian and neighboring countries.

Every single member of the Polish parliament during the 17th and 18th century had an absolute veto (Latin: liberum veto); as a result, legislation could only be passed unanimously. Originally, the procedure was used for technical issues such as points of order, but as diverging interests discovered they could disrupt their opponents' agenda singlehandedly, the process came to be abused.

== See also ==
- Hung parliament
- Kurultai
