= Convocation Sejm of 1764 =

The Convocation Sejm of 1764 was a confederated convocation sejm of the Polish–Lithuanian Commonwealth which met in Warsaw from 7 May to 23 June. It was tasked with preparing a royal election to fill the throne of the Commonwealth, but also carried out a series of reforms to the Commonwealth.

The Sejm was led by Sejm marshal, Adam Kazimierz Czartoryski. Familia party of Czartoryski magnate family, backed by the Russian Empire (whose military forces were occupying parts of the Commonwealth) forced an election of their candidate (Stanisław August Poniatowski). In protest at the presence of Russian forces, and influence of Russian ambassador to the Commonwealth, Herman Karl von Keyserling, many opposition deputies left the session - in the end the Sejm passed its decisions with only 80 deputies (out of 300) and 7 senators (out of 136). The Sejm approved the cession of the territory of the Commonwealth to Russia, made in the Eternal Peace Treaty of 1686.

== Reforms and decisions ==
- Stanisław August Poniatowski was elected the new King of the Poland and Grand Duke of Lithuania, replacing Interrex Władysław Aleksander Łubieński.
- The imperial title of the Russian Tsar and the royal title of the King in Prussia were recognized.
- Private tariffs were abolished.
- A general tariff for public treasury was introduced.
- The liberum veto was abolished for discussions of financial and military matters.
- A unified system of measurements was introduced.
- The tax system was reformed (kwarta, head tax).
- The Jewish Council of Four Lands was discontinued, as it failed to deliver collected taxes.
- The Treasury and Military Commissions were created.
- The hetman's powers were limited.
- Crown lands (królewszczyzna) were to be reviewed for incompetent management to increase public revenue.
- The special privileges (serwitoriaty) of some royal craftsman were abolished, along with royal enclaves (jurydyki) near cities, which were not subject to municipal laws and regulations.
