= Liberum veto =

Parliamentary device in the Polish–Lithuanian Commonwealth

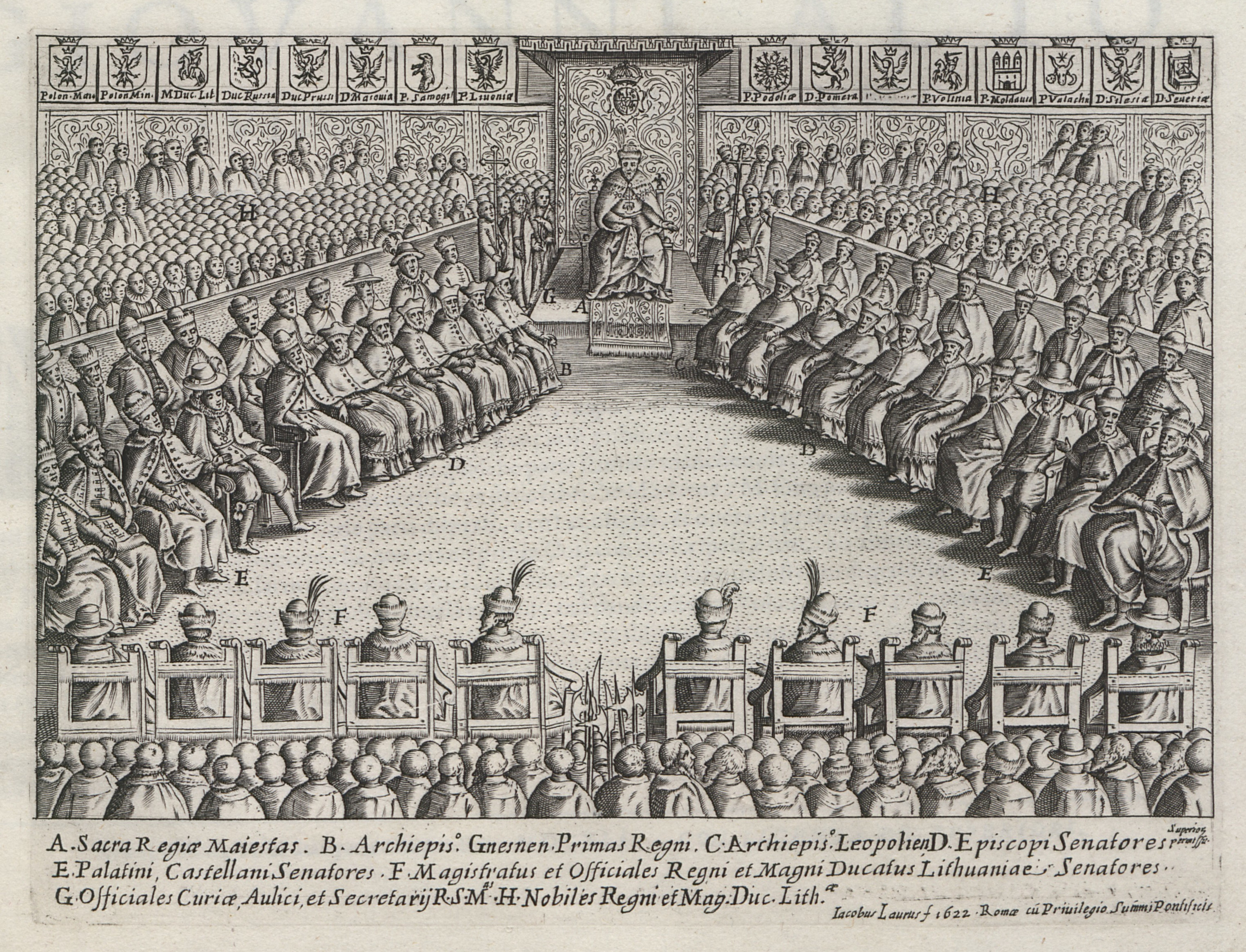
Sejm session at the Royal Castle, Warsaw, 1622

The liberum veto (Latin for "free veto" (Note: Latin veto is originally a verb meaning "I forbid it" or "I protest"; this word was, in addition to its normal uses, in Roman times employed as an interjection by the tribuni plebis to protest any measure of the Roman Senate or the magistrates, and eventually was also nominalized in reference to its use as an interjection.)) was a parliamentary device in the Polish–Lithuanian Commonwealth. It was a form of unanimity voting rule that allowed any member of the Sejm (legislature) to force an immediate end to the current session and to nullify any legislation that had already been passed at the session by shouting either Sisto activitatem! (Latin: "I stop the activity!") or Nie pozwalam! (Polish: "I do not allow!"). The rule was in place from the mid-17th century to the late 18th century in the Sejm's parliamentary deliberations. It was based on the premise that since all of the Polish–Lithuanian noblemen were equal, every measure that came before the Sejm had to be passed unanimously. The liberum veto was a key part of the political system of the Commonwealth, strengthening democratic elements and checking royal power and went against the European-wide trend of having a strong executive (absolute monarchy).

Many historians hold that the liberum veto was a major cause of the deterioration of the Commonwealth political system, particularly in the 18th century, when foreign powers bribed Sejm members to paralyze its proceedings, causing foreign occupation, dominance and manipulation of the Polish–Lithuanian Commonwealth and its eventual destruction in the partitions. Piotr Stefan Wandycz wrote that the "liberum veto had become the sinister symbol of old Polish anarchy". In the period of 1573–1763, about 150 sejms were held, about a third failing to pass any legislation, mostly because of the liberum veto. The expression Polish parliament in many European languages originated from the apparent paralysis.

== Origin ==
The rule evolved from the principle of unanimous consent, which derived from the traditions of decision making in the Kingdom of Poland, and it developed under the federative character of the Polish-Lithuanian Commonwealth. Each deputy represented a region in the Sejm, himself being elected at a sejmik (the local sejm of a region). He thus assumed responsibility to his sejmik for all decisions taken at the Sejm. Since all noblemen were considered equal, a decision taken by a majority against the will of a minority (even if only one sejmik) was considered a violation of the principle of political equality.

At first, the dissenting deputies were often convinced or cowed back to withdraw their objections. Also, at first, the rule was used to strike down only individual laws, not to dissolve the chamber and throw out all measures passed. For example, as historian Władysław Czapliński describes in the Sejm of 1611 context, some resolutions were struck down, but others passed. From the mid-17th century onward, however, an objection to any item of Sejm legislation from a deputy or senator automatically caused other, earlier adopted legislation to be rejected. That was because all legislation that was adopted by a given Sejm formed a whole.

It is commonly and erroneously believed that a Sejm was first disrupted by the liberum veto by a Trakai deputy, Władysław Siciński, in 1652. In reality, he vetoed only the continuation of the Sejm's deliberations beyond the statutory time limit. He had, however, set up a dangerous precedent. Over the proceedings of the next few sejms, the veto was still occasionally overruled, but it became gradually more accepted. Before 20 years had passed, in 1669 in Kraków, the entire Sejm was prematurely disrupted on the strength of the liberum veto before it had finished its deliberations by the Kyiv deputy, Adam Olizar. The practice spiraled out of control, and in 1688, the Sejm was dissolved even before the proceedings had begun or the Marshal of the Sejm was elected.

== Zenith ==
During the reign of John III Sobieski (1674–1696), half of Sejm proceedings were scuttled by the veto. The practice also spread from the national Sejm to local sejmik proceedings. In the first half of the 18th century, it became increasingly common for Sejm sessions to be broken up by the liberum veto, as the Commonwealth's neighbours, chiefly Russia and Prussia, found it to be a useful tool to frustrate attempts at reforming and strengthening the Commonwealth. By bribing deputies to exercise their vetoes, Poland–Lithuania's neighbours could derail any measures not to their liking. The Commonwealth deteriorated from a European power into a state of anarchy. Only a few Sejms were able to meet during the reign of the House of Saxony in Poland (1696–1763), the last one in 1736. Only 8 out of the 18 Sejm sessions during the reign of Augustus II (1697–1733) passed legislation. For a period of 30 years around the reign of Augustus III, only one session was able to pass legislation (1734–1763). The government was near collapse, giving rise to the term "Polish anarchy", and the country was managed by provincial assemblies and magnates.

Disruption of the Commonwealth governance caused by the liberum veto was highly significant. From 1573 to 1763, about 150 Sejms were held, of which 53 failed to pass any legislation. Historian Jacek Jędruch notes that out of the 53 disrupted Sejms, 32 were disrupted by the liberum veto.

== Final years ==
The 18th century saw an institution known as a "confederated sejm" evolve. It was a parliament session that operated under the rules of a confederation. Its primary purpose was to avoid disruption by the liberum veto, unlike the national Sejm, which was being paralyzed by the veto. On some occasions, a confederated sejm was formed of the whole membership of the national Sejm so that the liberum veto would not operate.

The second half of the 18th century, marking the age of the Polish Enlightenment, also witnessed an increased trend aiming at the reform of the Commonwealth's inefficient governance. Reforms of 1764–1766 improved the Sejm's proceedings. Majority voting for non-crucial items, including most economic and tax matters, was introduced, with binding instructions from sejmiks being outlawed. The road to reform was not easy, as conservatives, supported by foreign powers, opposed most of the changes and attempted to defend the liberum veto and other elements perpetuating the inefficient governance, most notably by the Cardinal Laws of 1768.

The liberum veto was finally abolished by the Constitution of 3 May 1791, adopted by a confederated sejm, which permanently established the principle of majority rule. The achievements of that constitution, however, which historian Norman Davies called "the first constitution of its kind in Europe", were undone by another confederated sejm, meeting at Grodno in 1793. That Sejm, under duress from Russia and Prussia, ratified the Second Partition, anticipating the Third Partition, the final dissolution of the Polish-Lithuanian state, just two years later.

== Significance ==
Harvard political scientist Grzegorz Ekiert, assessing the history of the liberum veto in Poland–Lithuania, concludes:

The principle of the liberum veto preserved the feudal features of Poland's political system, weakened the role of the monarchy, led to anarchy in political life, and contributed to the economic and political decline of the Polish state. Such a situation made the country vulnerable to foreign invasions and ultimately led to its collapse.

Political scientist Dalibor Roháč noted that the "principle of liberum veto played an important role in [the] emergence of the unique Polish form of constitutionalism" and acted as a significant constraint on the powers of the monarch by making the "rule of law, religious tolerance and limited constitutional government... the norm in Poland in times when the rest of Europe was being devastated by religious hatred and despotism."

It was seen as one of the key principles of the Commonwealth political system and culture, the Golden Liberty.

At the same time, historians hold that the principle of liberum veto was a major cause of the deterioration of the Commonwealth political system and Commonwealth's eventual downfall. Deputies bribed by magnates or foreign powers, or simply content to believe they were living in some kind of "Golden Age", for over a century paralysed the Commonwealth's government, stemming any attempts at reform. Piotr Stefan Wandycz wrote that the "liberum veto had become the sinister symbol of old Polish anarchy." Wagner echoed him thus: "Certainly, there was no other institution of old Poland which has been more sharply criticized in more recent times than this one.".

== Modern parallels and popular culture ==
=== References in popular culture ===
A 2004 Polish collectible card game, Veto, set in the background of a royal election during an election sejm, is named after this procedure.

In the Netflix series 1670, Jan Paweł uses liberum veto to "win" an assembly.

=== Modern parallels ===
Until the early 1990s, IBM had a decision-making process called "non-concur" in which any department head could veto a company-wide strategy if it did not fit in with their own department's outlook, the disagreements being then sent to the superiors in the hierarchy, often taking several months. This effectively turned IBM into several independent fiefdoms. "Non-concur" was eliminated by CEO Louis Gerstner, who was brought in to revive the declining company.

Dispositions of the European Union law requiring unanimity between states have been compared to the liberum veto by some commenters. Wallonia vetoing Belgium's signature of the Comprehensive Economic and Trade Agreement (CETA) with Canada brought comparisons to this rule.

Decisions made by the United Nations can be dropped if a single one of the permanent members casts a negative vote regarding agenda items. In the UN Security Council, veteoes were and are frequently used by both the USSR/Russian Federation and the United States for geopolitical gains.

== See also ==
- Consensus decision-making
- Filibuster
- Minoritarianism
