= Jacek Jędruch =

- Born: 22 February 1927; Warsaw, Poland
- Died: 17 March 1995 (aged 68); Athens, Hellenic Republic
- Citizenship: Poland, United States (naturalized)
- Education: B.S. in Mechanical Engineering (Northeastern University, 1956); M.S. in Nuclear Science (MIT, 1958); Ph.D. in Nuclear Engineering (Penn State, 1966)
- Occupations: Nuclear Engineer, Historian
- Notable work: Constitutions, Elections and Legislatures of Poland, 1493–1977 (1982); Nuclear Engineering, Data Bases, Standards, and Numerical Analysis (1985)
- Spouse: Ewa Krystyna Hoffman

Jacek Jędruch (22 February 1927 – 17 March 1995) was a Polish-American nuclear engineer and historian, known for his works regarding the constitutional and parliamentary history of Poland. Born in Warsaw, he participated in the Polish resistance during World War II and later emigrated to the United States.

Jędruch earned degrees in engineering from Northeastern University, the Massachusetts Institute of Technology (MIT), and Pennsylvania State University, and worked in nuclear engineering for over two decades.

He died during an accident at the Acropolis in Athens, Greece in 1995.

== Life ==
During World War II, Jędruch participated in the Polish Resistance movement. After the war, he escaped communist security forces by making his way to the West. He traveled to England and from there emigrated to the United States.

He earned degrees from Northwestern University and the Massachusetts Institute of Technology, and a Ph.D. from Pennsylvania State University.

While his vocation was nuclear technology, his avocation was the study of representative governments, the evolution of government policy in relation to public needs, and political developments in Central Europe. This combination of interests prompted him to write a guide to Polish parliamentary history (first edition 1982, second edition 1997).

He was at work on the second edition when in March 1995, while traveling in Greece with his wife Ewa, a chemical engineer, he suffered a fatal accident at the Acropolis in Athens. Working from Jędruch's notes, his wife Ewa completed the second edition of his book.

== Works ==
- Constitutions, Elections, and Legislatures of Poland, 1493-1977: a Guide to Their History, University Press of America, 1982.
- Nuclear Engineering Data Bases, Standards, and Numerical Analysis, Van Nostrand Reinhold, 1985.
- Constitutions, Elections, and Legislatures of Poland, 1493-1993: a Guide to Their History, Summit, NJ, EJJ Books, distributed by Hippocrene Books, 1997.

== See also ==
- List of Poles
