= Ignacy Władysław Ledóchowski =

Ukrainian architect (1867–1932)

Ignacy Ledóchowski
- Ignacy-Władysław Gałka-Ledóchowski
- Born: 25 May 1867; Strelniki, Podolia Governorate, Russian Empire
- Died: 3 March 1932 (aged 64); Warsaw, Poland
- Education: Ghent University
- Occupation: Architect
- Buildings: Kachkovsky Clinic
- Design: Art Nouveau style

Count Ignacy Władysław Ledóchowski (25 May 1867, Strelniki – 3 March 1932, Warsaw) was an architect and civil engineer who worked in Kyiv at the beginning of the 20th century. Alongside architect Vladislav Gorodetsky, he is considered one of the "fathers of Kyiv's Art Nouveau." All his building designs were executed in the Art Nouveau style, characterized by a bright and recognizable architectural signature. Ignacy's architectural journey began with his graduation from Ghent University and the Technical Academy in Lviv. His move to Kyiv marked the start of a prolific period in his career, where he established himself as a prominent architect, known for his distinct Art Nouveau style. Among his notable works are the Kachkovsky Clinic and the Kozarovsky Mansion, both of which reflect his mature and European-influenced architectural approach. After World War I, he emigrated to Poland.

== Biography ==
Ignacy-Władysław was born on 25 May 1867 into the noble Ledóchowski family in the village of Strelniki in the Yampolsky Uyezd, Podolia Governorate.

His father, Count Kazimierz-Teofil-Jan Gałka-Ledóchowski, hailed from the ancient Ledóchowski family, of the Szalawa coat of arms, originally of the Orthodox faith until the late 17th century. The family converted to Catholicism and became Polonized in the 17th century. The family was relatively numerous but not wealthy, receiving the count title in Austria in 1800 and confirmed in the Russian Empire in 1845. The family's lands were divided among children, leaving Ignacy's father with a 45% share in the estate at Strzelnik, which he sold off by 1871. Kazimierz earned a living by managing other people's estates and sugar factories.

Ignacy had two younger brothers, Karol and Stanisław. Their father died of pneumonia when Ignacy was 20 years old, but all three brothers received good technical education.

=== Education ===
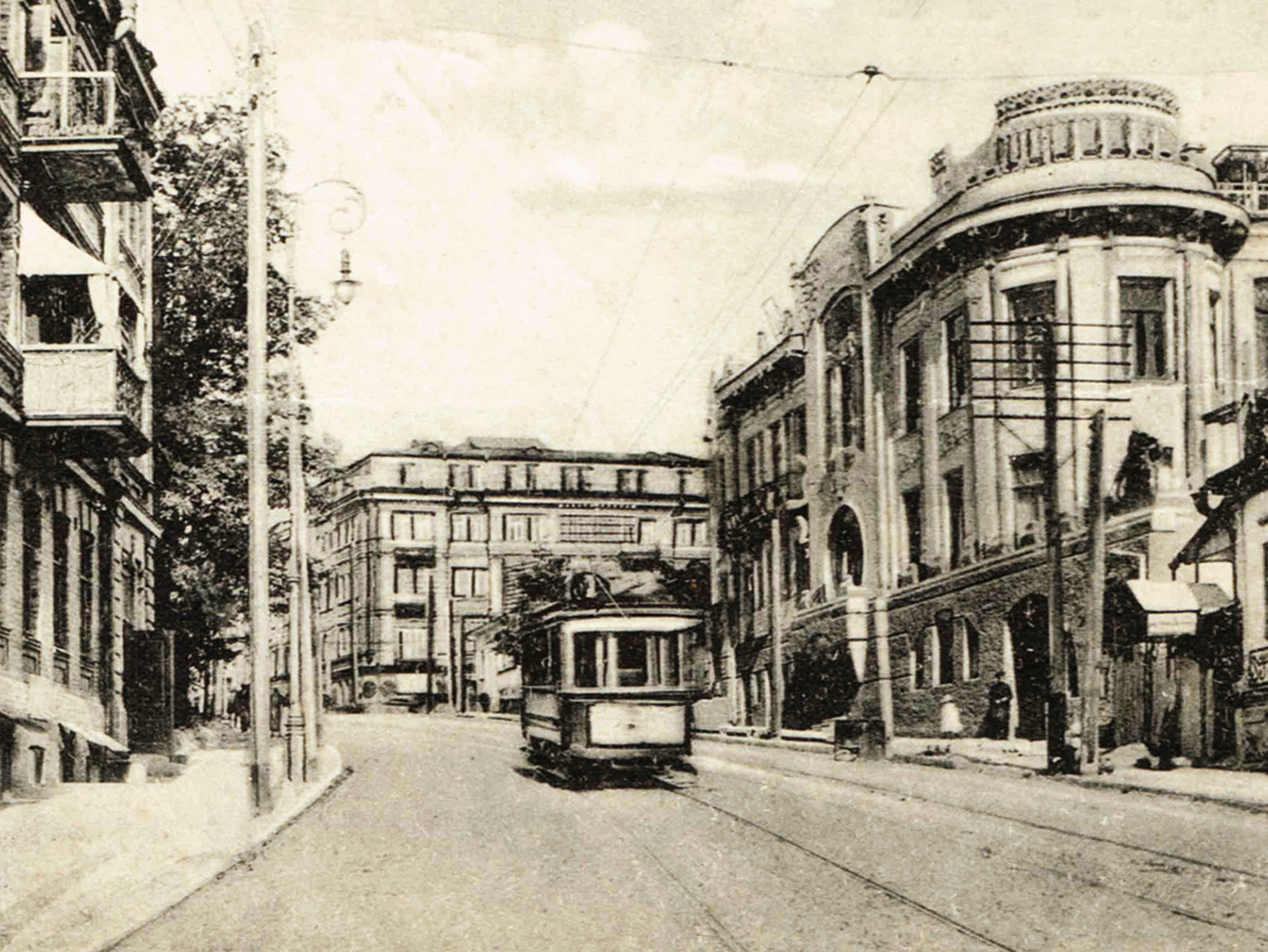
Kachkovsky Clinic, photo from 1911

Ignacy graduated from the Odessa Real School of St. Paul, where he studied for six years alongside his brothers and future architect Vladislav Gorodetsky. He completed higher education at Ghent University, Faculty of Engineering.

It is also known that Ledóchowski attended the Technical Academy in Lviv, now the Lviv Polytechnic National University, as a listener in the engineering department in 1892–1893.

=== Architectural Career in Kyiv ===
The first documented evidence of Ignacy Ledóchowski's life in Kyiv dates to 1905 when he lived in his brother Karol's apartment at 6 Bankova Street. Subsequent addresses include Bankova Street, 8 (1906), Mykhailivska Street, 12 (1910–1915), and Turhenevska Street, 28 (1916). From 1907, his architectural office "Count I.K. Ledóchowski & Co." was located at 3 Kreshchatitska Square, offering services in "Project development, detailed drawings and designs of buildings and structures, interior decoration, apartments and shops, cost estimates for construction works".

Notable projects by Ignacy Ledóchowski in Kyiv include:

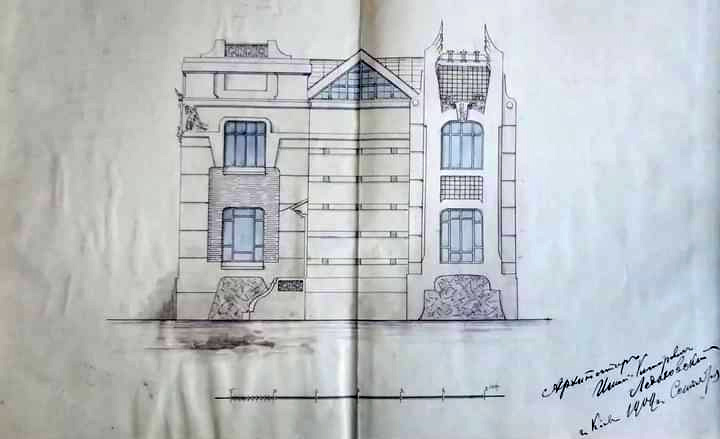
Design of Kozarovsky Mansion, signed by the author, 1909

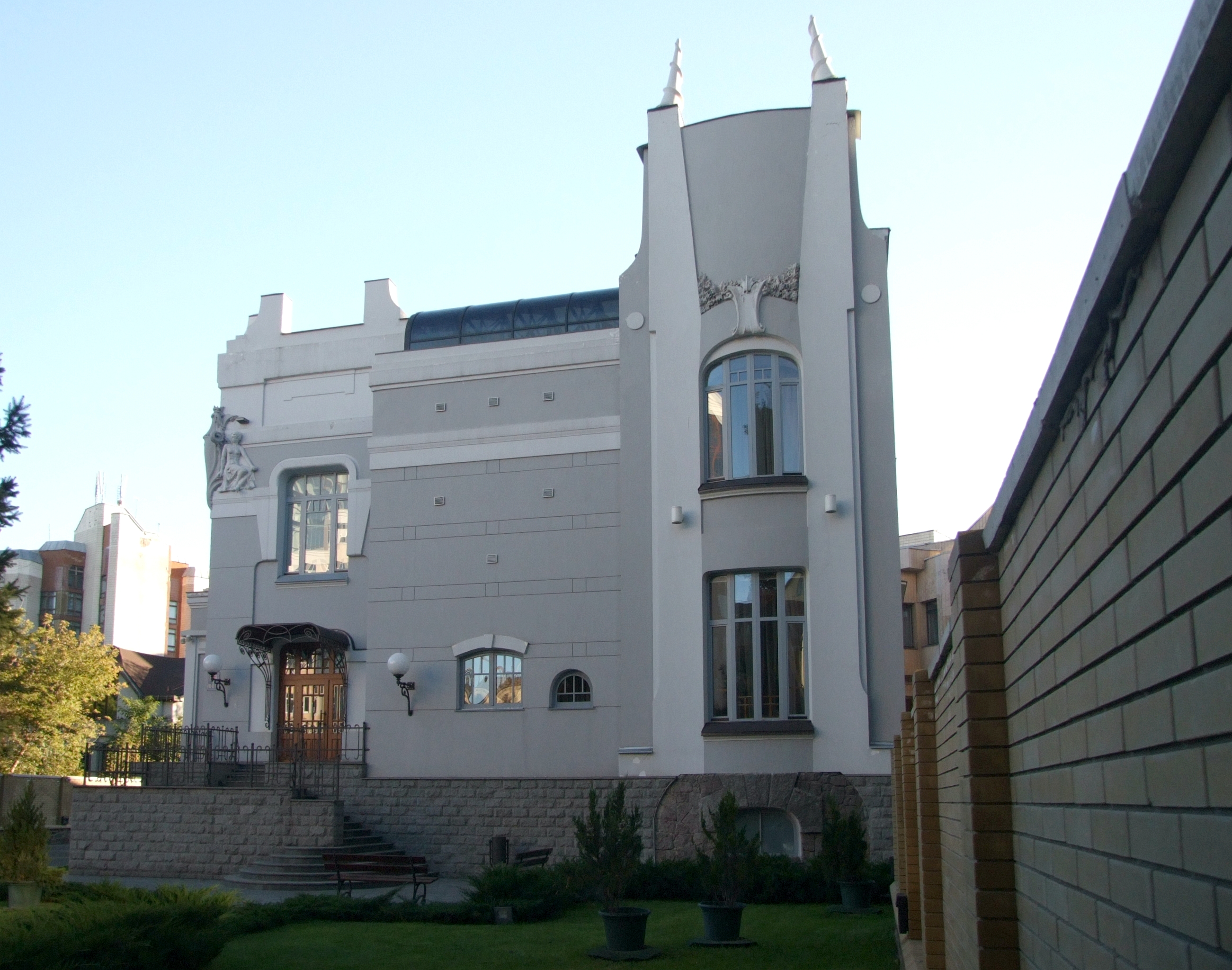
Kozarovsky Mansion, Baghovutivska St, 14, present state

- Late 19th century – Tenement house, 8 Bezakovska St – Architecture Monument of local significance. Some experts question Ledóchowski's authorship of this building.
- 1907 – Mansion and clinic of Dr. V. Kachkovsky, 33 Malovladimirska St, sculptor F.P. Sokolov (1872–1931) – National Heritage Monument Some experts question Ledóchowski's authorship of this building.
- 1909 – Mansion of V. Kozarovsky, 14 Baghovutivska St – Architecture Monument of local significance. Despite having an approved project signed by Ledóchowski, it is not certain if the building was constructed according to it.

After the October Revolution, Ignacy Ledóchowski lost his business in Kyiv and emigrated to Poland. It is known that in 1925 he lived in Warsaw at 67 Dzika St. He died on 3 March 1932 in Warsaw.

=== Collaboration with Sculptor Sokolov ===
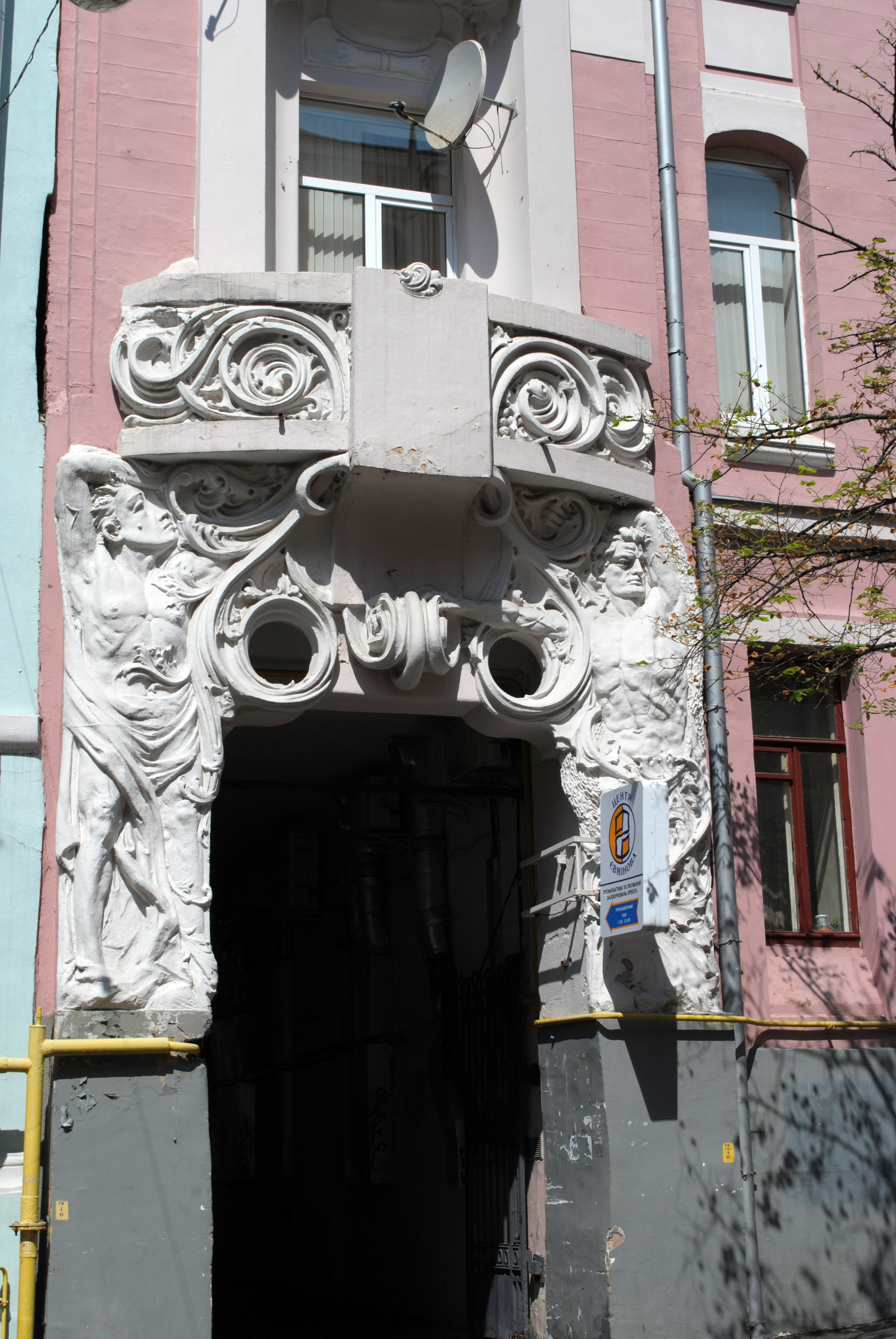
Arch decoration in Kozerovsky's apartment house, 1913. Sculptor F. P. Sokolov

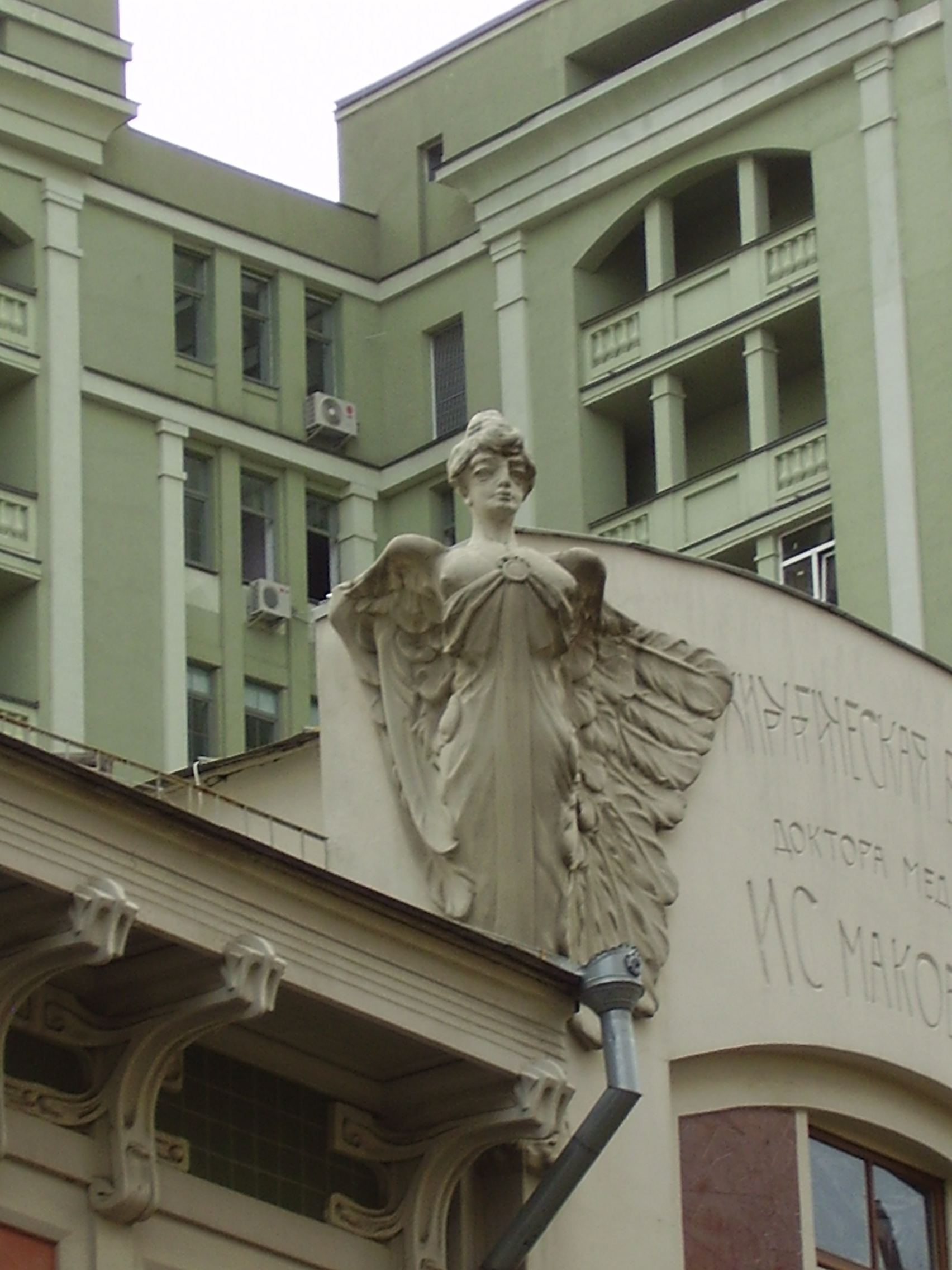
Sculpture of a siren at Kachkovsky Clinic, 1907. Sculptor F. P. Sokolov

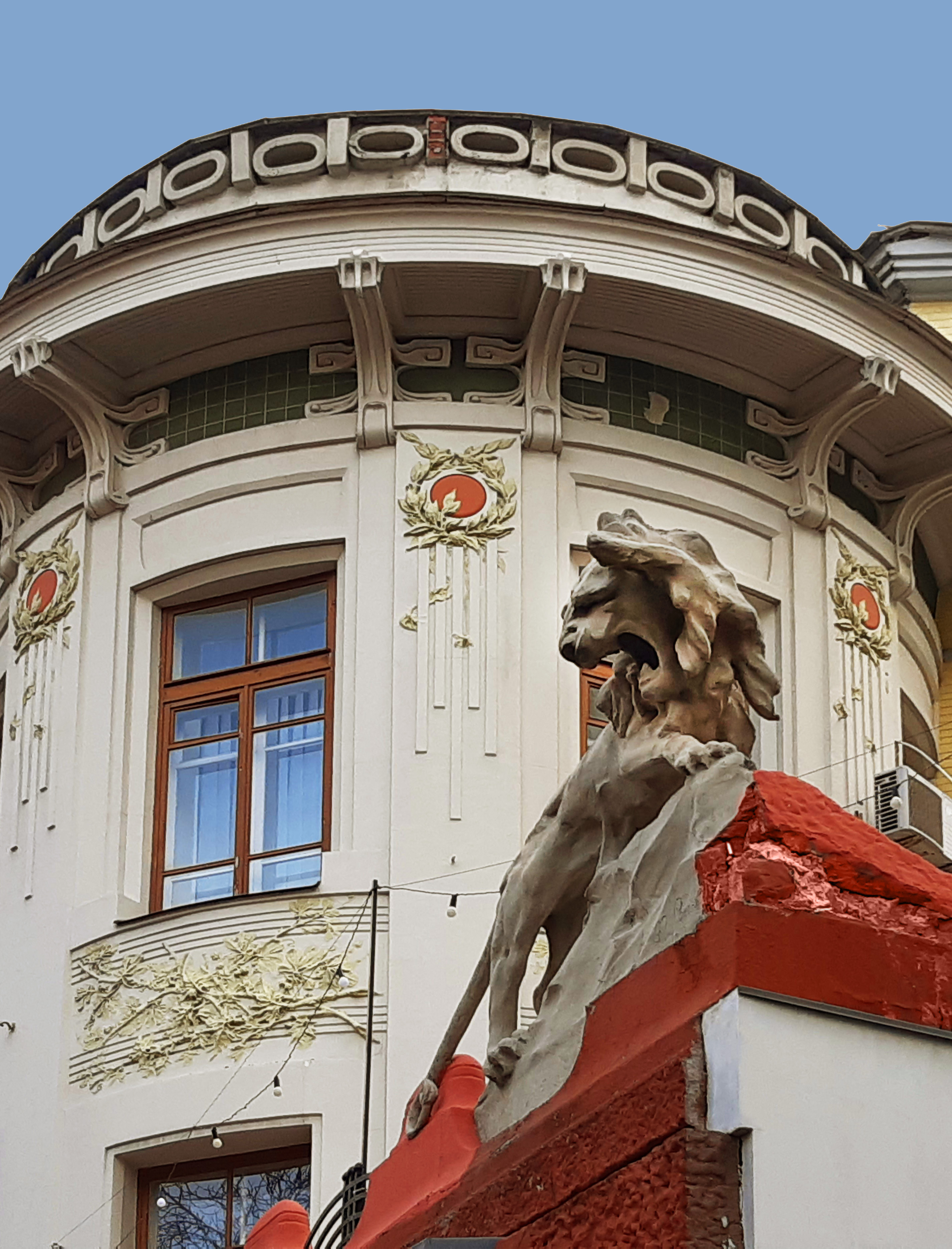
Sculpture of a lion at Kachkovsky Clinic, 1907. Sculptor F. P. Sokolov

The most prestigious and expensive commissions for architects in Kyiv at that time were carried out by the sculptor Elio Salia, who collaborated fruitfully with the famous Gorodetsky and did work on decorating the most prestigious and expensive orders. Ledóchowski collaborated with Sokolov, another renowned sculptor who specialized in casting sculptures from concrete, a new material at that time.

Researchers, to attribute Ledóchowski's works that lack documentary evidence, used the presence of decor on houses made by Sokolov – unlike Ledóchowski, he signed his works.

=== After the Fall of the Russian Empire ===
Like many other representatives of the nobility, Ignatius emigrated from the country. When and how he did so is unknown – he may have left the same way as his brother Karol (it is known that he left in 1917 via Constantinople). It is also known that before 1917, Ignatius Ledóchowski's first wife and their five-year-old daughter died of diphtheria. It is not precisely known when Ignatius Ledóchowski moved to his younger brother Stanislav in Warsaw. On 4 November 1921, in Warsaw, Ignatius remarried – his wife was the unmarried teacher Józefa Oponska, who was 31 years old. The couple lived on Przemysłowa Street, 32 – the house in which his younger brother later created the Maritime Museum of Stanisław Ledóchowski.

His younger brother Stanisław was a well-known entrepreneur in Poland. Initially, Stanisław was the manager of the Russo-Belgian Society of Metal Products "Russobelge" — the company was founded in the early 20th century, and the product range included irons, stoves, balustrades and stairs, door handles, and much more. In 1909, Stanisław bought the "Metal Products Factory" from the owners. He actively developed the business, and in subsequent years, his brother Ignatius joined him. When Count Stanisław Ledóchowski headed the plant, he focused on the production of metal products — Ledóchowski Mesh — Ledóchowski Mesh – a metal mesh formed from a sheet of metal with parallel cuts arranged in a staggered manner. After making the cuts, the sheet is stretched perpendicular to the cut lines, resulting in a diamond-shaped mesh with a monolithic structure without seams and moving joints. In 1914, Ledóchowski managed to create a joint-stock company for the production of solid mesh metal in Warsaw, "Count S. Ledóchowski and Company". In 1921, the factory was renamed to "Polish Solid Mesh Factory of Count Stanisław Ledóchowski SA" ("Polska Fabryka Siatki Jednolitej Hrabiego Stanisława Ledóchowskiego SA"). The brothers Stanisław and Ignatius together converted one of the factory buildings into a 62-room hotel with central heating and opened it in 1926 under the name "Ledóchowski Hotel". There is also a preserved project for the reconstruction of factory premises, designed by Ignatius Ledóchowski in the early 1920s, but the reconstruction did not take place.

Ignacy Ledóchowski died on the night of 2 to 3 March 1932, in Warsaw. The Ledóchowski factory in Warsaw on Przemysłowa Street, No. 24 was nationalized in 1950. After the 1990s, the Ledóchowski family managed to reclaim the house. In 1997, this house was bought from them by the insurance company MetLife.

== Legacy ==
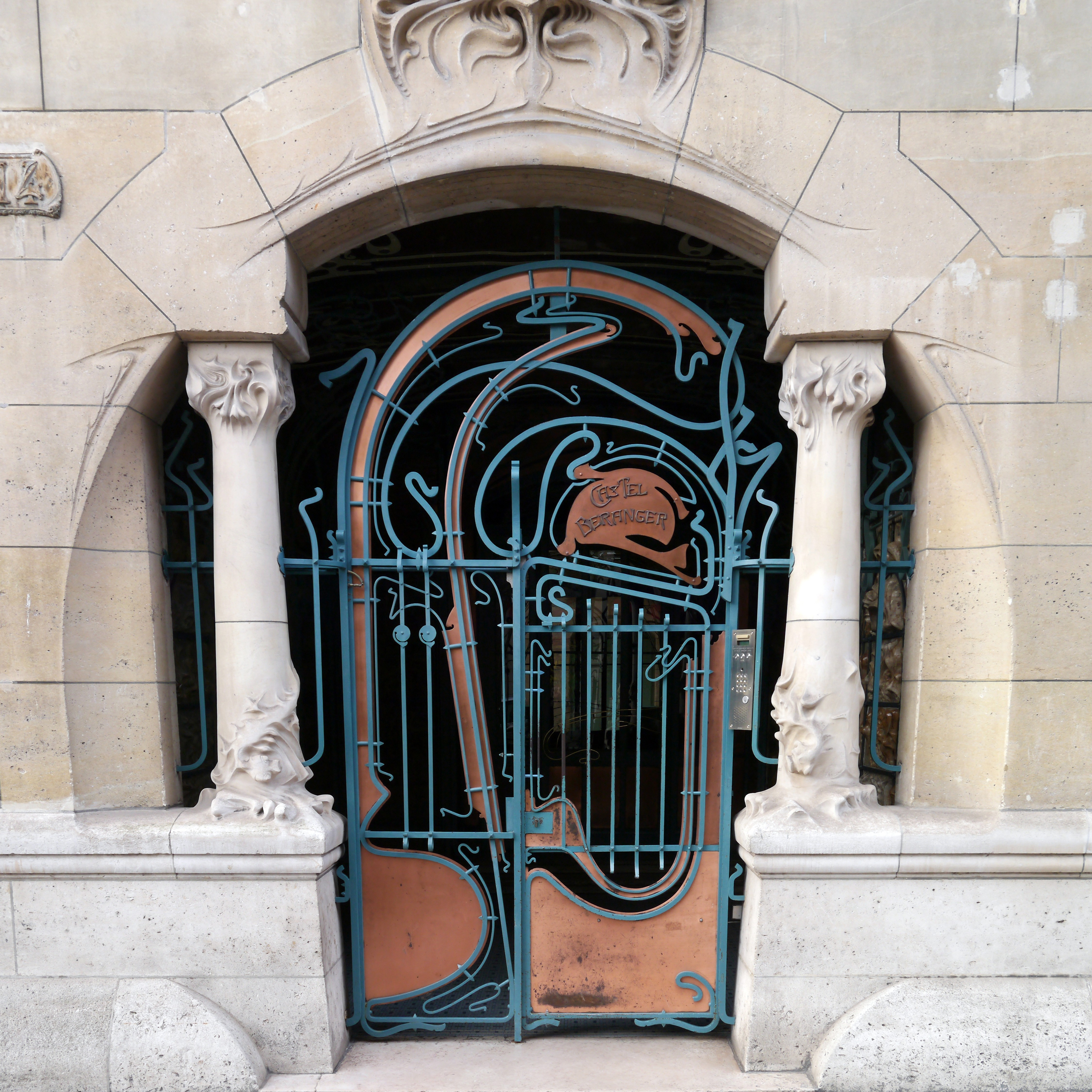
Main entrance to "Castel Béranger", the first Art Nouveau house in Paris, architect Hector Guimard, 1898

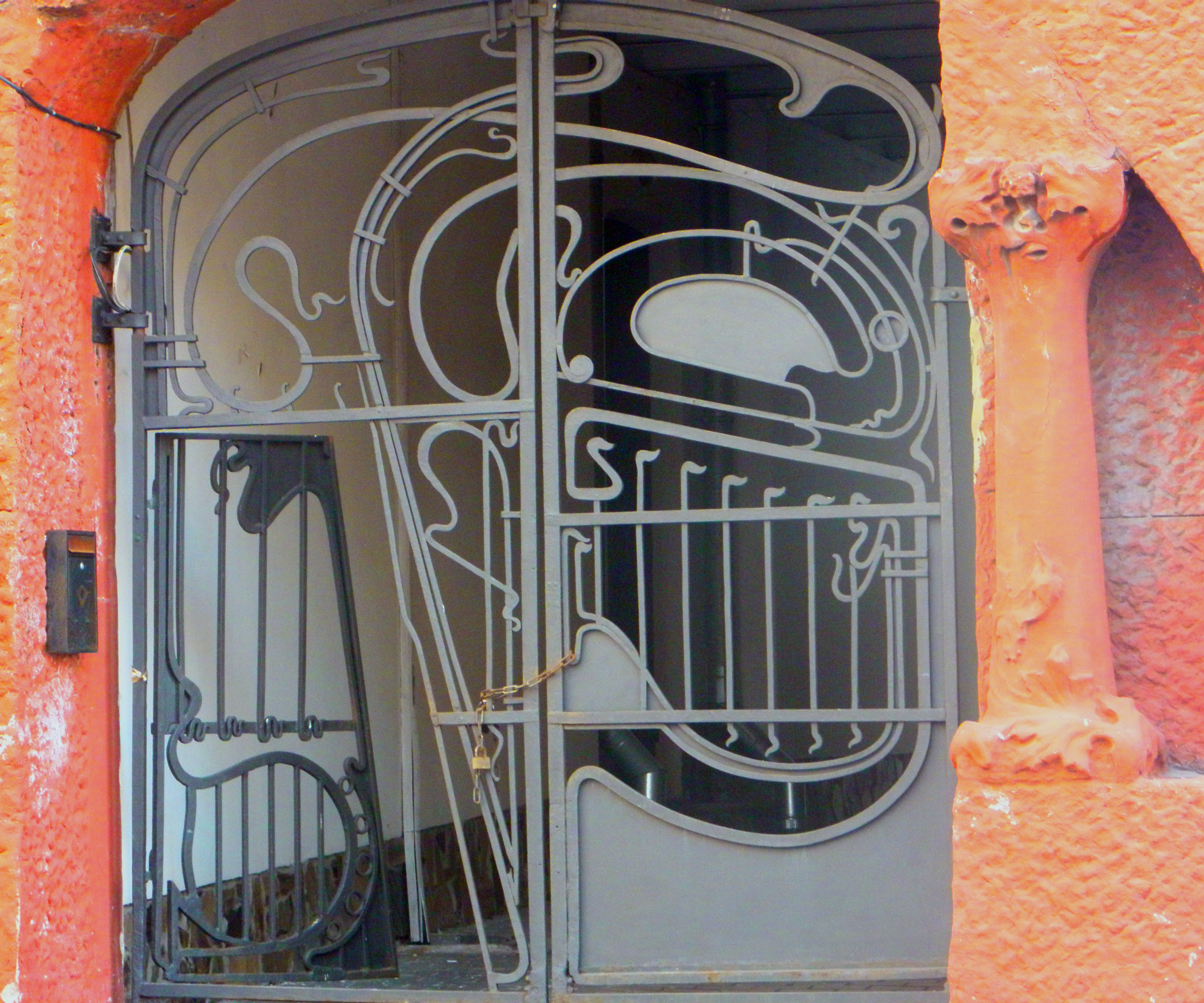
Design element of Kachkovsky Clinic, 1907. The architectural quote emphasizes asymmetry, and only one column is left

Ignacy Ledóchowski, along with Władysław Horodecki, is considered the "father of Kyiv's Art Nouveau". Experts note that the Art Nouveau architectural style of Horodecki and Ledóchowski is closest to the European decorative Art Nouveau and is free from the eclecticism typical of the rest of Kyiv's Art Nouveau. Experts describe Ledóchowski's architectural style as "mature Art Nouveau" and "European (French-Belgian) Art Nouveau".

Buildings designed by Ignacy Ledóchowski have a recognizable architectural signature, but for a long time, there was no documentary evidence of the authorship of some works attributed to him. This circumstance aroused interest in the biographical data of the architect, his education, and experience, but even the dates of his birth and death were unknown for a long time. Historians, researchers, and journalists often referred to Ledóchowski with epithets such as "mysterious", "enigmatic", and even "ghost". Researchers and historians gradually restored the main milestones of his biography and found documentary evidence of his authorship for some architectural projects that were hypothetically attributed to his legacy.

== Family ==
- Father – Count Kazimir-Teofil-Jan Halka-Ledóchowski (Kazimir Vladislavovich Ledóchowski) (1840–1887).
- Mother – Józefa from the "Danilevich" (Danilevich family) (ca. 1850–1879).
- Stepmother – Dorota-Genowefa Proskur (married in 1882, with 18-year-old Dorota, daughter of Franciszek and Valeria Proskur).
- Brothers – Karol-Józef (1871–1931) and Stanisław-Antoni (1874–1940).
- First wife – it is known that she and their five-year-old daughter died of diphtheria before 1917.
- Second wife – school teacher Józefa Opońska, married in 1921.

== Gallery ==
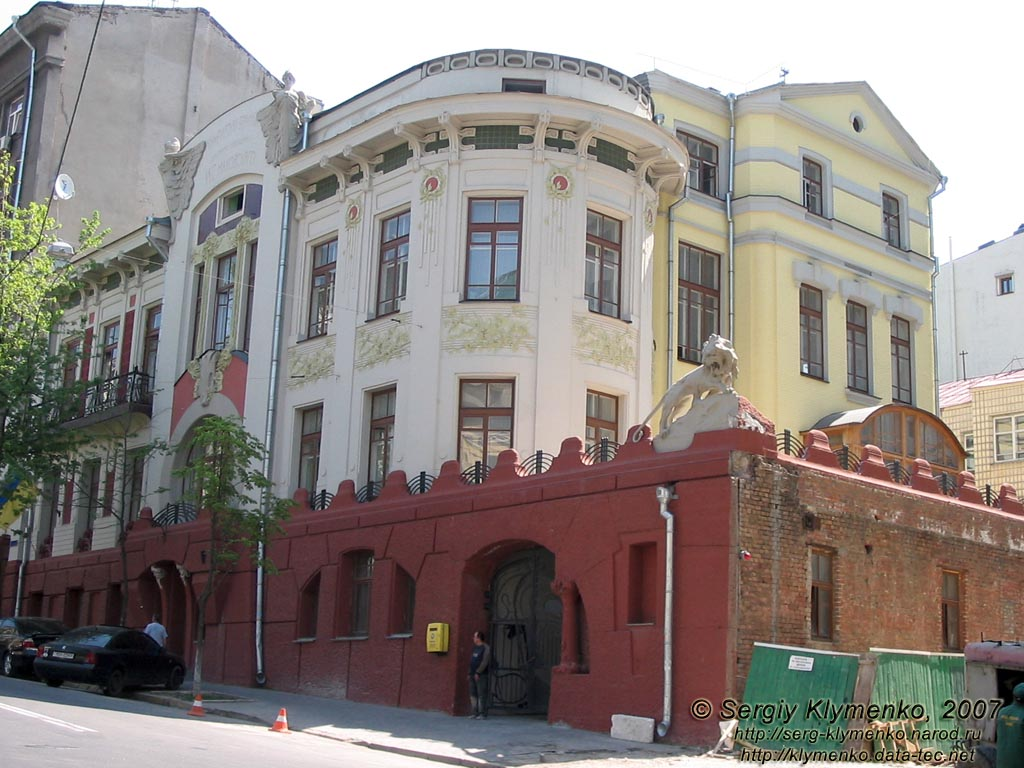
Mansion and clinic of Dr. Kachkovsky, Malovladimirovskaya St, No. 33

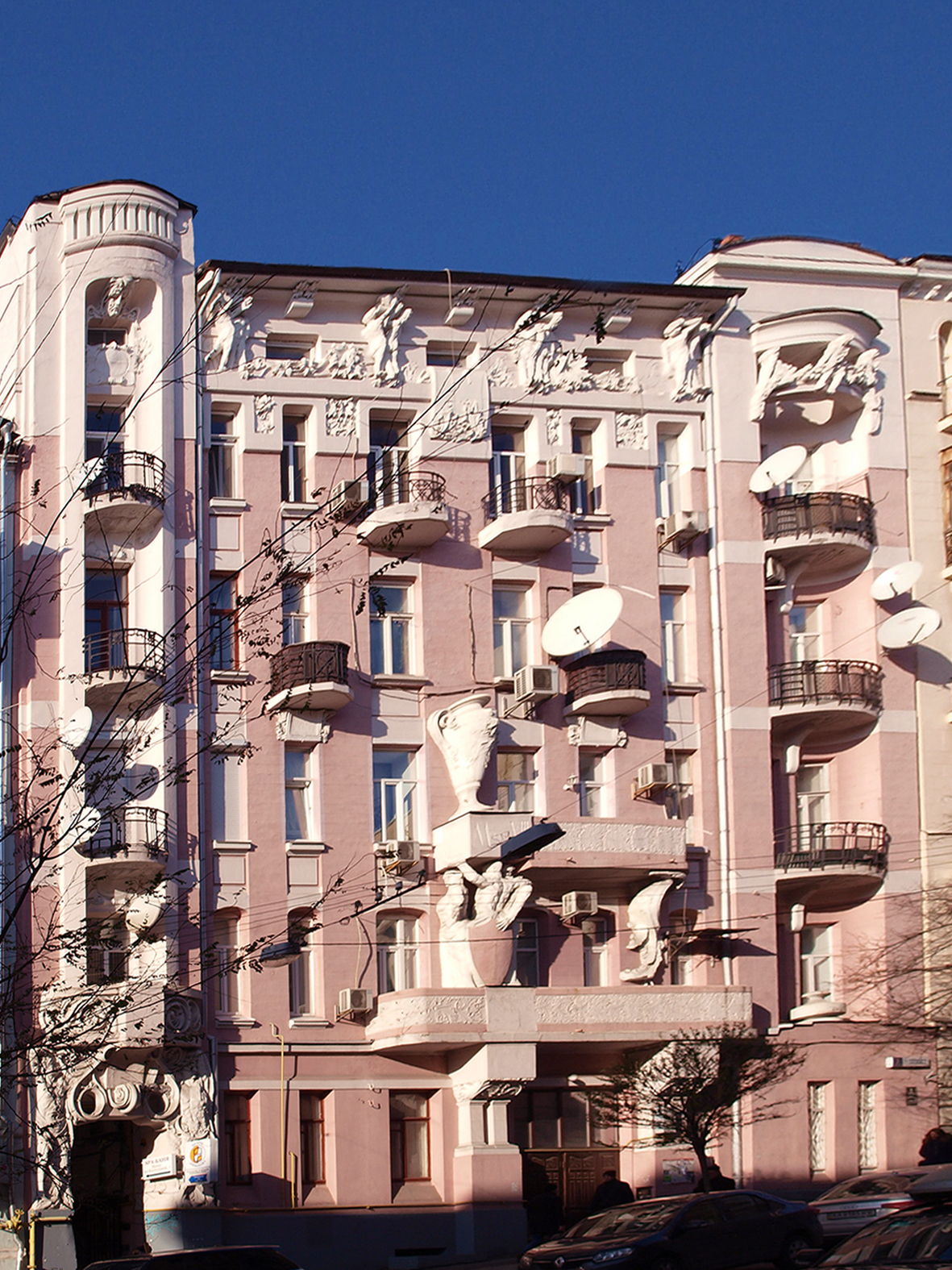
Kozerovsky Income House, Kostelna St, No. 7

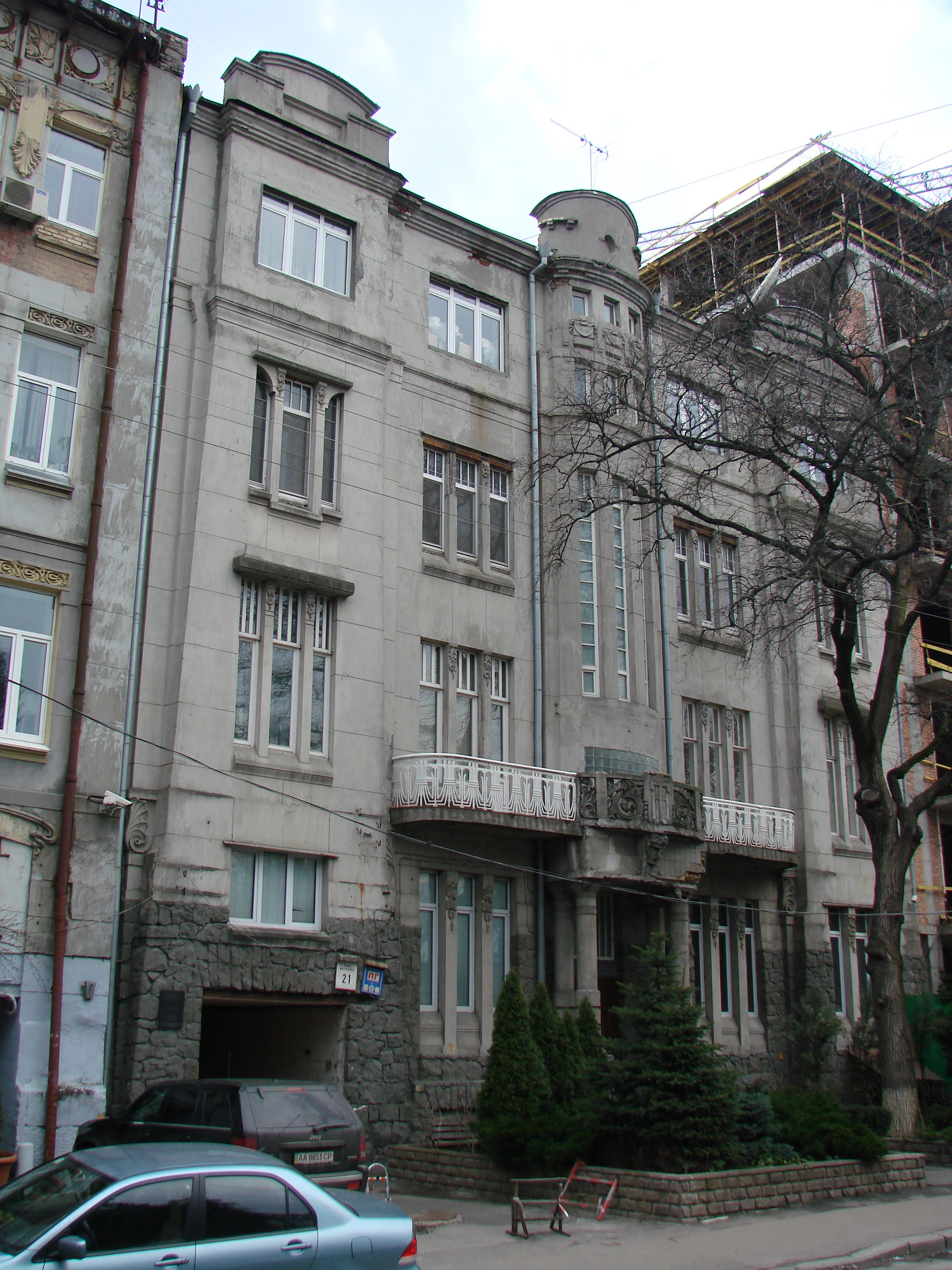
Income House of Dr. Trofimov, Nazarivska, 21

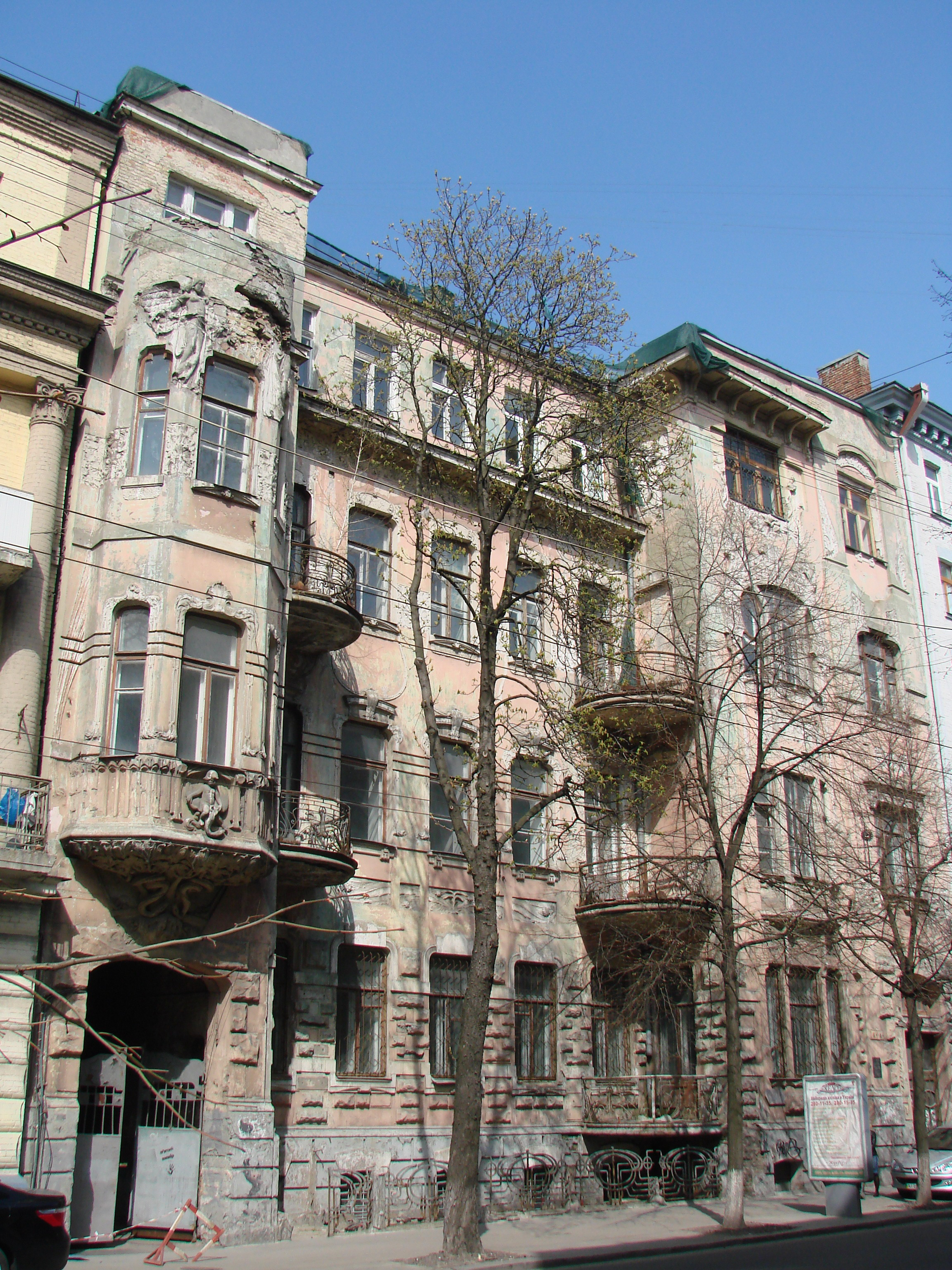
House with Snakes, Velyka Zhytomyrska St, No. 32

== See also ==
- Vladislav Gorodetsky
- Art Nouveau architecture

== Sources ==
- Lobko, O. (2022). "Little-known Pages of the Ledóchowski Family's Life. Architect Ignacy Ledóchowski: Creativity and Fate". Kyiv Historical Studies (in Ukrainian). 1 (14): 96–106. doi:10.28925/2524-0757.2022.112. ISSN 2524-0757.
- Timofienko, V.I. (2016). "Ledóchowski Ignacy Kazimirovich". Encyclopedia of Modern Ukraine (in Ukrainian). NAS of Ukraine, NTSh, Institute of Encyclopedic Research of NAS of Ukraine.
- Ivashko, Yu.V. (2008). "The Specifics of Art Nouveau Schools in Ukraine and the Problem of External Influences in Ukrainian Art Nouveau". Urban Planning and Territorial Planning (in Ukrainian) (31): 145–155.
- Mokrousova, O.H. (2016). "Ukrainian-Polish Architectural Visions: A Look through Times and Epochs". The Contribution of Polish Architects of Kyiv in the 19th – Early 20th Centuries to the Formation of the City's Historical Image (in Ukrainian). Golden Pages. pp. 156–166. ISBN 978-966-372-810-0.
