= Personal union of Poland and Saxony =

European entity (1697–1706; 1709–1763)

Poland–Saxony Unia polsko-saska (Polish) Sachsen-Polen (German)
- 1697–1763
- Royal Banner Coat of Arms of Wettin kings of Poland

- Map depicting the personal union in 1714 Saxony-Poland-Lithuania Courland and Semigallia (vassal)
- Status: Personal union
- Capital: Warsaw (de facto)/Kraków (de jure) and Dresden^{[a]}
- King
  - 1697–1733: Augustus II the Strong
  - 1733–1763: Augustus III of Poland
- Historical era: Early modern period
  - Established: 1697
  - Disestablished: 1763
Preceded by	Succeeded by
Polish–Lithuanian Commonwealth; Electorate of Saxony	Polish–Lithuanian Commonwealth; Electorate of Saxony
- a. The king resided alternately in Warsaw and Dresden, whereas Kraków remained the officially designated capital of Poland. The kings also often stopped and hosted meetings with foreign delegations and sessions of the Senate in Wschowa, which was dubbed the "unofficial capital of Poland".

The personal union of Poland and Saxony, or Saxony-Poland, was the personal union that existed from 1697 to 1706 and from 1709 to 1763 between the Electorate of Saxony under the House of Wettin and the aristocratic republic/elective monarchy of Poland-Lithuania. After the death of Augustus III of Poland in 1763, the personal union expired because the guardian of the still underage Saxon Elector Frederick Augustus III (1750–1827) renounced his claims to the throne and the Russian Empress Catherine the Great had her favorite Stanislaus II August Poniatowski elected king. In Poland, the period with Wettin rulers on the Polish throne is also called the Saxon period (czasy saskie). In Polish memory it is known for its particular disorder.

This period was the first since Bolesław I the Brave that Poland and Meissen/Saxony were politically connected.

== Dominions ==
=== Poland-Lithuania ===
Due to the exhausting Second Northern War, the Commonwealth was a country without state administrative bodies, with an underdeveloped economy, insufficient tax revenues and an army that was neither qualitatively nor numerically ready for the requirements of the time. Poland-Lithuania had a wealth of raw materials and was therefore interesting for commercial Saxony. In Poland, Polish officials, the Polish Crown Army and the state treasury were subordinate to the Sejm, whose policies were determined by the powerful magnate families and the Szlachta. Their penchant for forming confederations turned the kingdom into a powder keg. The Polish parliament was unable to act due to these private interests (Liberum Veto); the crown itself had only limited income, which was subordinate to the crown treasurer Jan Jerzy Przebendowski. This meant that Poland had an extreme predominance of the estates over the monarch.

=== Electorate of Saxony ===
The Electorate of Saxony had highly developed manufacturing and crafts. Due to its coherent territory, it was considered a powerful state structure inside the Holy Roman Empire. Saxony was still superior to Brandenburg-Prussia in terms of internal development at the end of the 17th century, but had to cede the Protestant leadership role in the Holy Roman Empire to Brandenburg in the following decades.

== Coronation of Elector Frederick Augustus I as Polish king ==
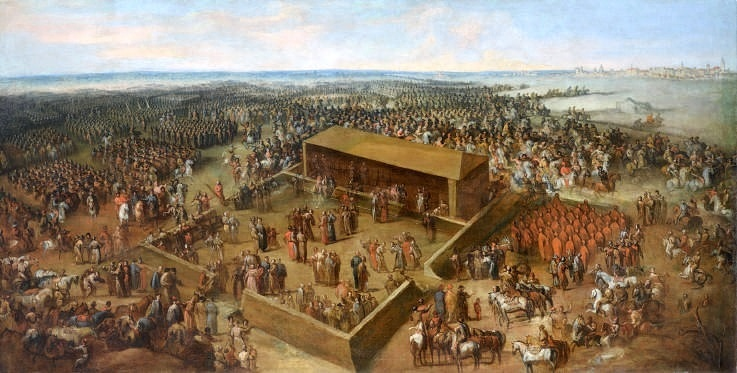
Coronation of Frederick Augustus I as Polish king (1790 painting)

One driving force behind the attainment of royal dignity was the desire for political sovereignty, which Elector Frederick Augustus I promised to give further weight in foreign policy. The long-lasting and consolidated dominance of the Habsburg dynasty in the empire encouraged the elector to avoid the threat of a loss of rank and power by increasing his rank in an area that did not belong to the empire. Another important motif were the question of rank and prestige, which at that time indicated the position of power and therefore had immediate political significance. All princes of this time followed the French model of Louis XIV, such as elaborate courtly ceremonies, lavish banquets with opera performances and ballets. The acquisition of the Polish royal crown therefore represented a question of prestige of the first order for Elector Frederick Augustus I. Because only with a royal crown could a German prince be accepted by the European powers as an equal.

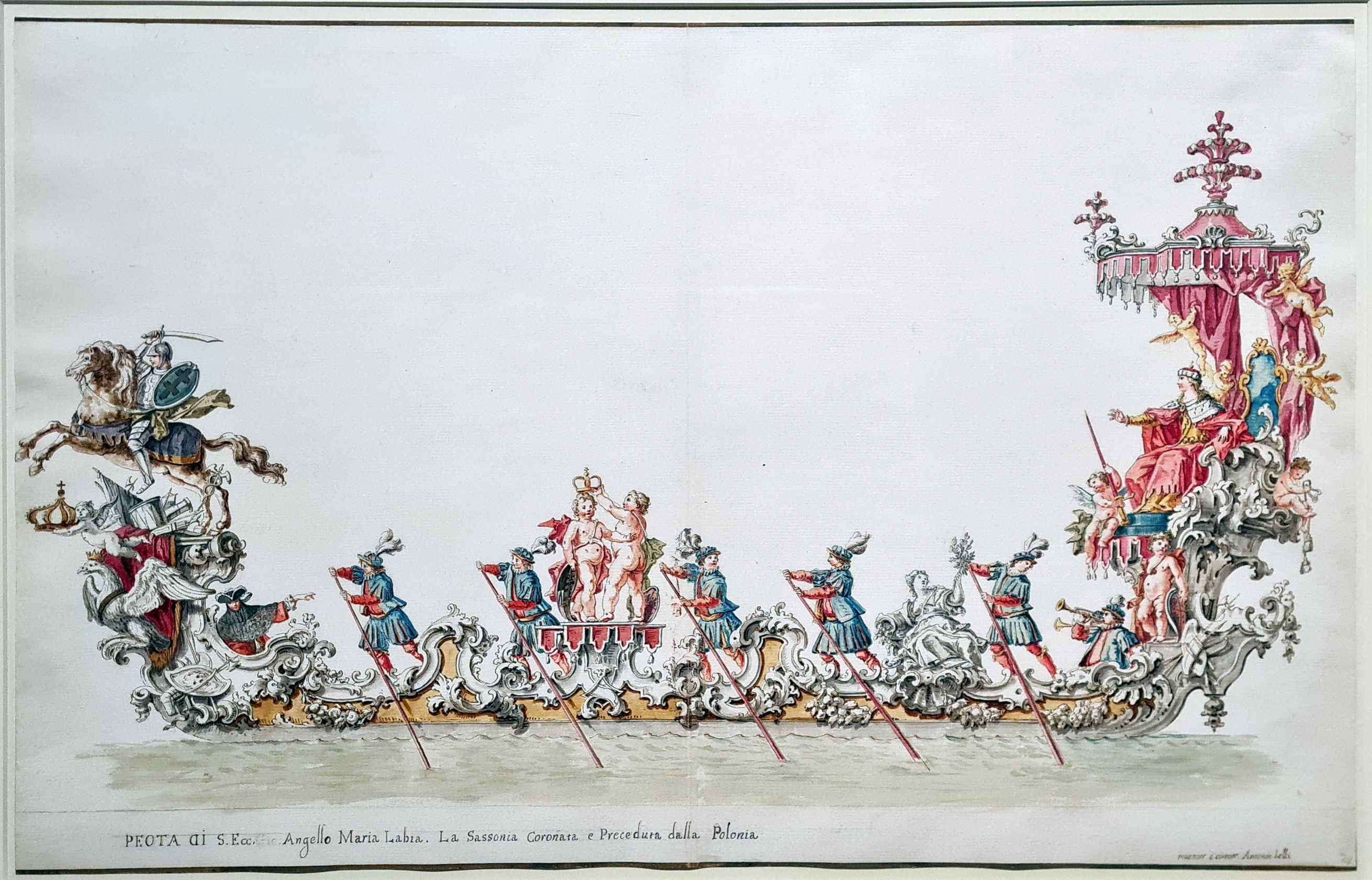
A watercolor by Antonio Joli (1700–1744) entitled “La Sassonia Coronata e Preceduta dalla Polonia” (“Saxony Crowned and Preceded by Poland”), 1740. The work depicts an allegorical scene of Saxony being crowned by Poland aboard an ornate barge. At the bow of the vessel are visible the symbols of the Polish–Lithuanian Commonwealth: the White Eagle and Lithuanian Knight.

The Saxon ambassador in Warsaw, Jacob Heinrich von Flemming, had previously succeeded in completely fragmenting the competition by fielding ever new applicants. The efforts of Pope Innocent XI's nephew, Prince Livio Odescalchi, Duke of Bracciano and Ceri, James Louis Sobieski, the son of the former King John III. Sobieski, Johann Wilhelm, Elector Palatine, Louis William, Margrave of Baden-Baden, Maximilian II Emanuel, Elector of Bavaria and twelve other candidates were therefore hopeless. François Louis, Prince of Conti who traveled from France for the royal election, was even able to garner a larger number of votes than August, but had to return to his homeland, forced by Saxon troops.

After the usual bribes, Elector Augustus the Strong was able to return on 26/27 July. Contrary to all initial expectations, he was elected on the electoral field in Wola in June. On 15 September 1697 he was crowned as Augustus II in Kraków.

== Initial conditions ==
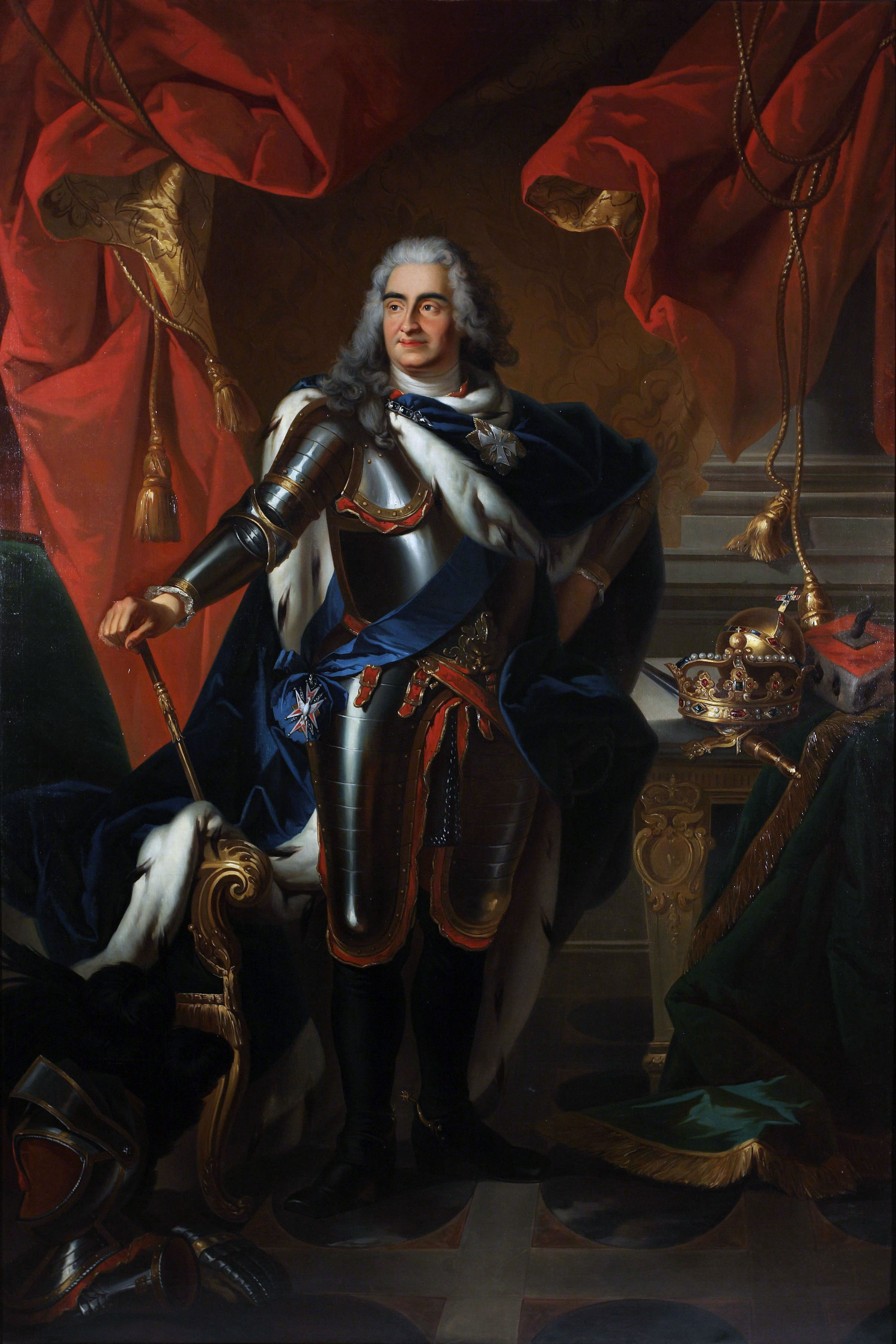
Augustus II the Strong

After the coronation, advantageous opportunities arose for both sides. Both sides felt threatened by Brandenburg-Prussia and its territorial ambitions. By joining forces between the two countries, this danger could be averted for the time being. Both powers needed mutual support in Northern Europe, where the Prussian, Swedish and Russian armies were far superior to the Saxon and Polish armies. Since Poland-Lithuania was the larger of the two partners, the local nobility had reason enough to believe that they would succeed in protecting their interests. As constitutionalists, they were also more likely to succeed in controlling a foreign ruler than a local one.

Despite the advantages, such as additional dynastic inheritance claims and greater weight in peace negotiations, Saxony was not satisfied with winning the Polish royal crown. Instead, Poland's potential should be made financially and militarily available to the court in Dresden. This was contradicted by the limited powers that a Polish elective king possessed. The Electorate of Saxony could only hope to benefit from the connection with Poland if it managed to acquire a land bridge between the two countries. This hope was dashed with the Prussian annexation of Silesia after 1740. As long as communication, goods traffic and troop movements depended on the good will of the Habsburgs or Brandenburg-Prussia, Saxony-Poland could not be considered a great power. The idea of a real union between these opposing territories as such was certainly utopian, but the actors still considered a certain unification of the two countries in the areas of administration, military, economics and finance, similar to the core countries in the Habsburg Empire, possible. Points of connection, for example, were Poland's wealth of raw materials and Saxony's manufacturing economy.

== History of Saxony-Poland ==
After the occupation of Saxony by the Swedes in the Great Northern War, King Augustus II had to give up the Polish royal title in the Treaty of Altranstädt in 1706 and recognize Stanislaus I Leszczyński, who was supported by Sweden, on the throne. After the Swedish defeat in the Battle of Poltava in 1709, the Saxon Elector was able to regain the throne. After regaining the royal crown, King Augustus II sought to overthrow the Sejm in a coup. His representatives called for the Saxon army to be merged with the Polish Crown Army. Polish fortresses had been occupied and arrests made as early as 1713. Since this would have been a first step towards the establishment of an absolutist hereditary monarchy in Poland, it provoked the uprising of the Tarnogród Confederacy in 1715/16, led by Stanisław Ledóchowski and Jan Klemens Branicki, which put Augustus at risk of his throne. It was mainly a revolt of the small nobility against the king; Important magnates such as Lithuania's hetman Ludwik Pociej (a friend of Peter the Great) tended to try to mediate. Although the Saxon troops remained victorious in all major battles, they were unable to end the uprising, so money began to run out. King Augustus II accepted the Tsar's mediation and achieved only partial success in the Peace of Warsaw in 1716 and the Silent Sejm in 1717. In return, the Saxon army had to leave the country.

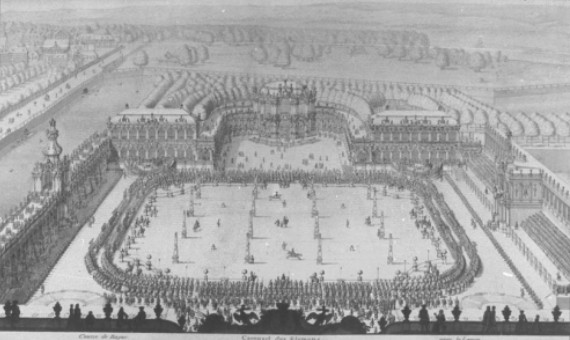
Wedding reception of Augustus III of Poland and Maria Josepha of Austria in 1719 in Dresden

After 1716, there were signs of a certain stabilization of Augustus II's government in Poland, which made some reforms possible - but there was no prospect of reforms in the spirit of absolutism. Several Imperial Diets collapsed, and King Augustus II tried unsuccessfully to secure the succession of the Electoral Prince as the next Polish king. At least Poland recovered economically from the effects of the Great Northern War in the 1720s. The feudal nobility could produce intensively, and the exchange of goods between Poland and Saxony, promoted by the Leipzig Trade Fair and facilitated by customs agreements, increased. The raw materials preferably came from Poland and finished products from Saxony. Palaces, parks and numerous new churches showed that Poland still had resources. But the aristocratic republic, which was constantly in internal blockage and power struggles, lacked the will and coherence to make something of it. A central economic and financial policy could not be implemented in Poland, a large part of the taxes (up to 20%) were stuck in the collection system and mercantilist thinking was limited to the self-interest of the magnate families.

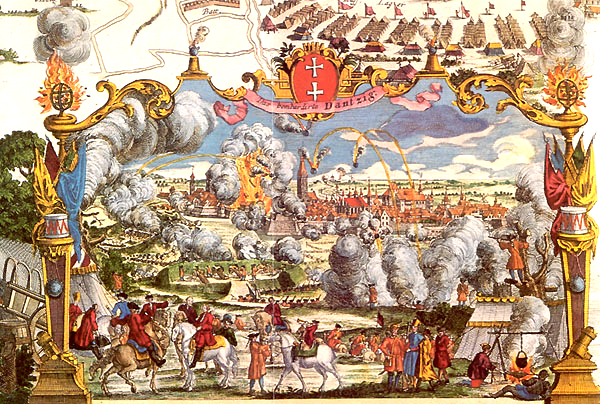
Siege of Danzig (1734) by Saxon-Russian troops in the War of the Polish Succession

Permanent postal routes from Dresden to Poznań, Toruń and Warsaw were established under Augustus II the Strong.

In addition to the lengthy and frustrating reform work in Poland, the permanent securing of Wettin rule in Poland played an important role in the politics of Augustus II. A first step in this direction was taken in 1733 when Elector Frederick Augustus II, the son of Augustus II, with the support of Austria and Russia and the usual bribes against the candidate of Sweden and France, Stanisław Leszczyński, was elected King of Poland. This triggered the War of the Polish Succession. Frederick Augustus II was crowned King of Poland as Augustus III of Poland on 17 January 1734 and claimed the crown in the Peace of Vienna (1738). Given this situation, the king and his prime minister Heinrich von Brühl hoped to control Poland with the “ministerial system” of magnates loyal to Saxony (who were placed in key positions) and tried to politically connect the two countries. During the Seven Years' War they even obtained the consent of their three allies for a renewed Polish crown candidacy for the Saxons, but the successes did not last.

In Saxony, after the fall of Aleksander Józef Sułkowski, Heinrich von Brühl led the government from 1738 to 1756, and in 1746 he formally became prime minister. He was a successful diplomat and consolidated the administration, but was sharply attacked in the state parliament in 1749 because of his financial policies. Despite Brühl's ruthless financial measures, the Electorate of Saxony was heading into crisis. The economy was damaged, the Saxon army, which was already too small, had to be disarmed and a significant portion of the taxes had to be pledged. There was also pressure from outside, as Saxon exports were severely hindered by the Prussian (customs) policy of the time.

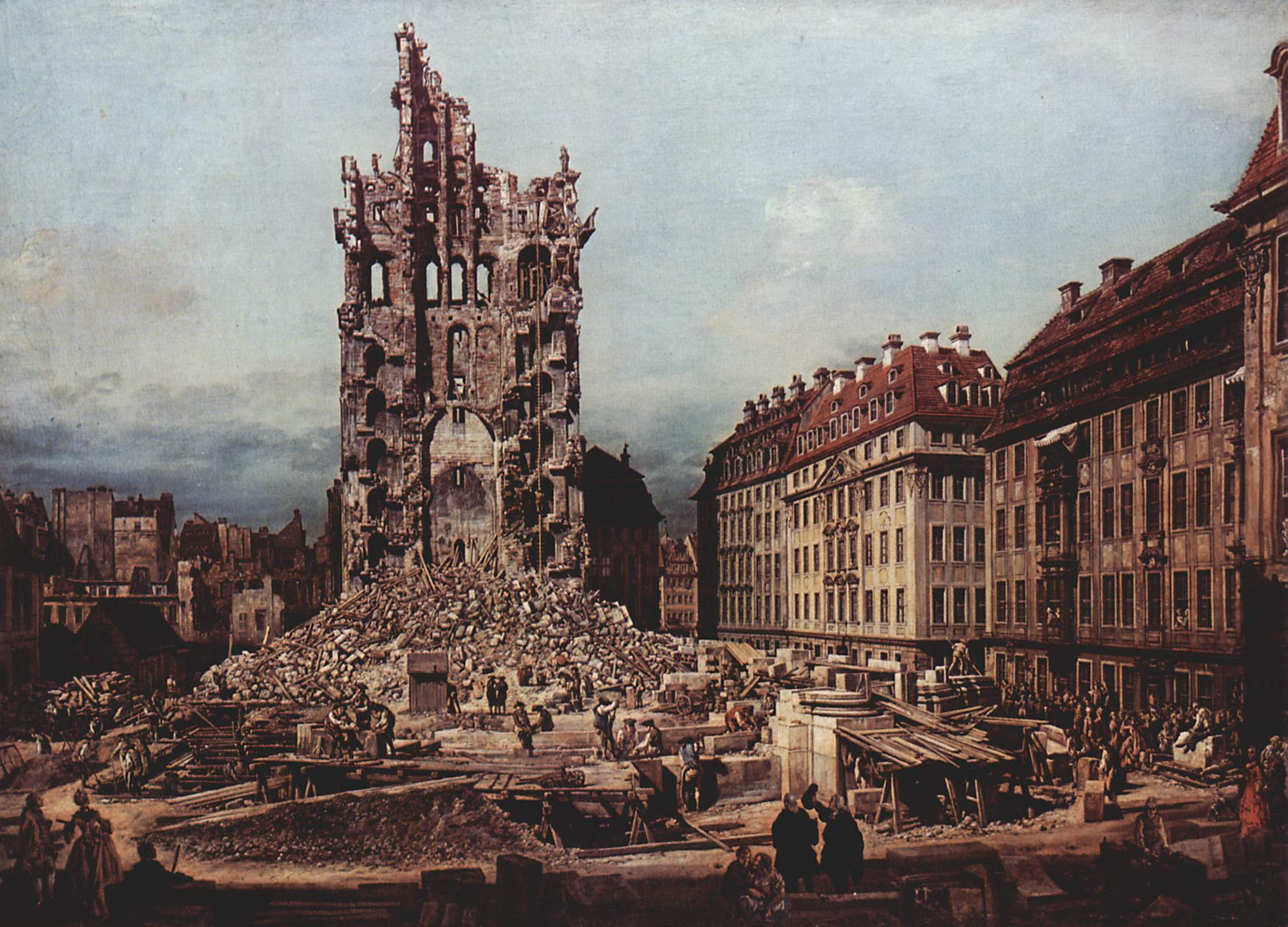
The destruction of the Dresden Kreuzkirche by Prussian cannonade in the Seven Years' War in 1760 (Canaletto, 1765)

But it was the Seven Years' War that brought Saxony's collapse in 1756. The Saxon army, which was too small, surrendered without a fight at Lilienstein under Count Rutowski, King Augustus III. and his court moved to Warsaw, where they remained in relative political powerlessness until the end of the war. The Electorate of Saxony, now provisionally administered by the Kingdom of Prussia and some cabinet ministers, became a theater of war and suffered. When the Seven Years' War ended with the Peace of Hubertusburg in 1763, the Electorate of Saxony, which had previously been quite prosperous, was ruined. Saxony also had no influence whatsoever on the awarding of the Polish crown: Poland-Lithuania had come under Russian hegemony more than ever; as successor to Augustus III. Stanisław August Poniatowski was appointed by Empress Catherine the Great, ending the personal union between Saxony and Poland.

== Outcome of the union ==
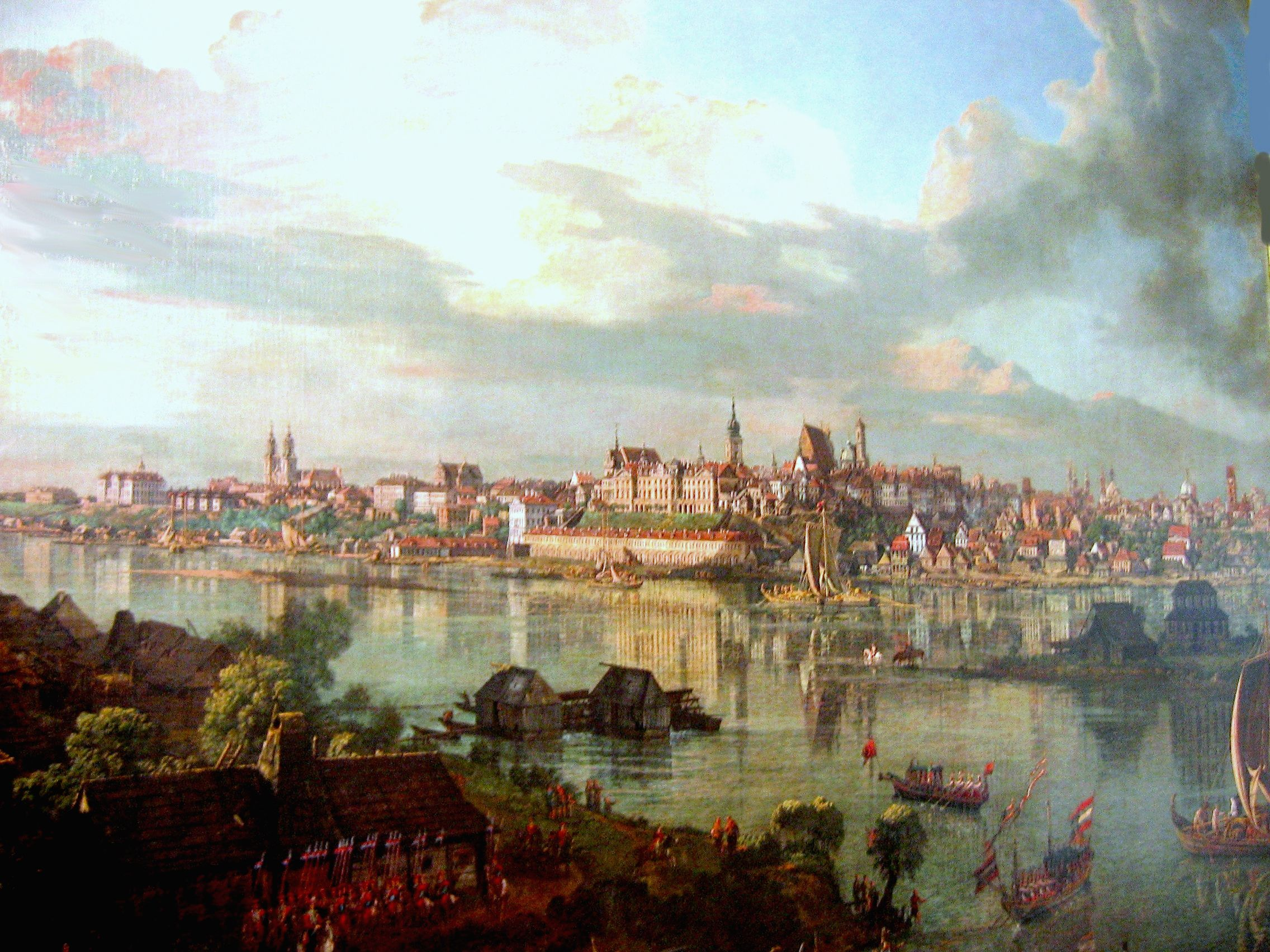
Painting of Warsaw by Canaletto (ca. 1770)

Saxon rule over Poland remained loose, so that the separation of Poland from Saxony in 1706 and 1763 did not tear apart any structures that had grown together. There were attempts to expand the Saxony-Poland personal union into a real state union. There were plans in Poland to establish a Saxon succession. However, these efforts did not lead anywhere. The Electorate of Saxony had clearly overextended itself despite the additional reputation that the Polish crown brought. The economy, administration and army stagnated due to the additional burdens caused by the enormous additional expenditure on art and representation. There was a lack of a consistent economic policy towards manufacturers in Saxony. Regional planning and improvement of agriculture were also neglected in Saxony. Saxony also lagged behind the neighboring powers in the further development of its military.

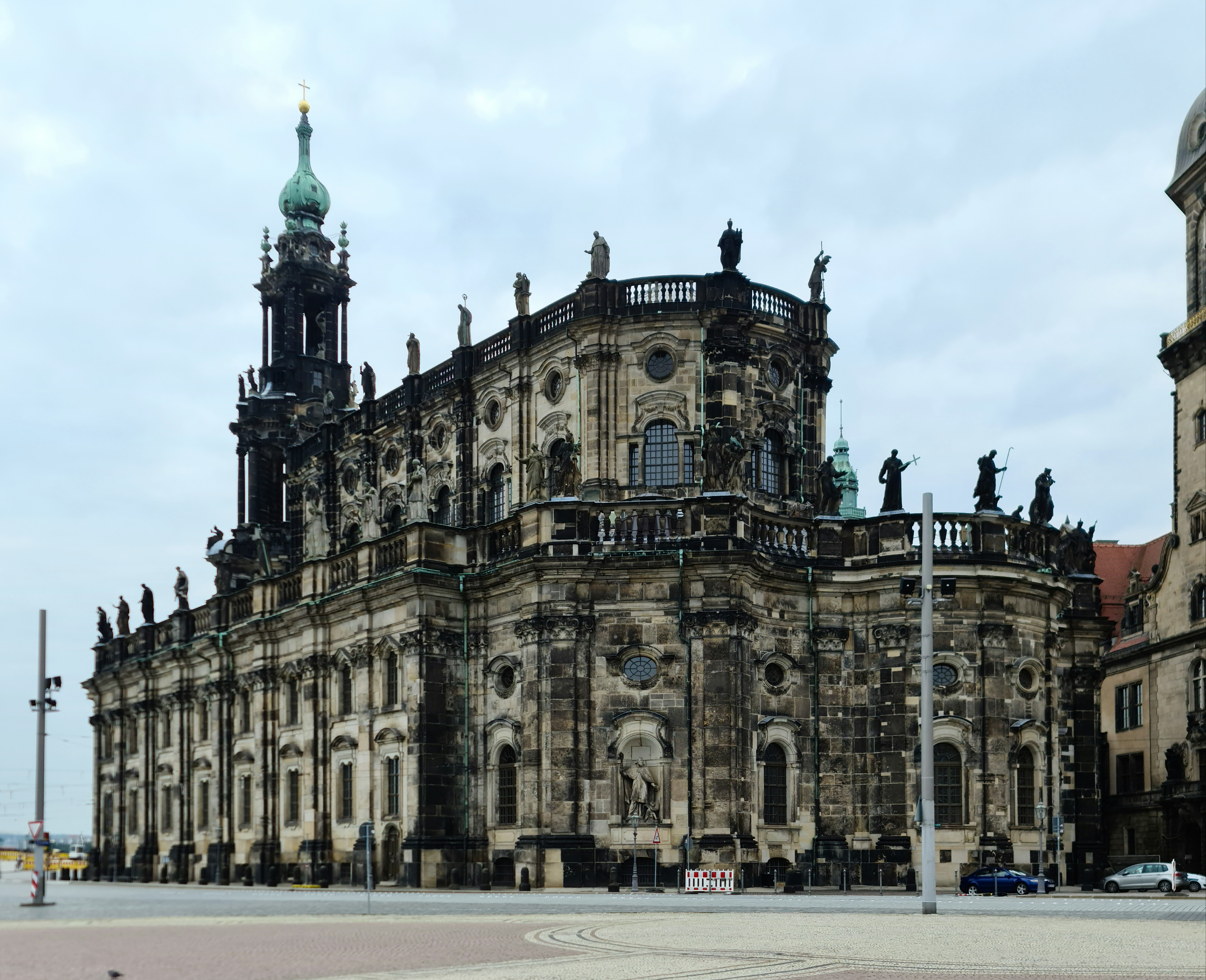
Dresden Cathedral, burial site of King Augustus III of Poland and his wife Queen Maria Josepha

With Augustus' conversion to Catholicism, Saxony lost its leading role among the Protestant imperial estates to Brandenburg-Prussia. However, Augustus renounced the use of the instrument cuius regio, eius religio, which would have enabled him to re-catholize Saxony or at least emancipate the Catholic religion. He instead assured his Saxon subjects in the religious insurance decree of 1697 (renewed by his son in 1734) that his conversion to the Catholicism has no consequences for them. Nevertheless, the change of faith, which only occurred as a result of power-political calculations, alienated the sovereign from his Protestant subjects.

The “Polish adventure” of their sovereign cost the Saxons dearly. Huge amounts of bribes flowed from the Saxon state treasury to the Polish nobility and to Polish church dignitaries (around 39 million Reichstaler during Augustus II's reign). King Augustus II even sold some not insignificant Saxon lands and rights for this purpose.

In Poland, this period, in which the Wettin dynasty ruled for 66 years, is also known as the Saxon period. The majority sees this time as negative for Poles. The decadent mood of that time was remembered, which became a symbol of the late Sarmatian aristocratic culture with its lavish celebrations and the lack of sense of responsibility among the majority of the magnates towards their own state. The names of the Saxon Garden and Saxon Palace in Warsaw refer to the period. Due to the weakening of the Rzeczpospolita, the partitions of Poland occurred a few decades later.

In Saxony, however, people speak of the Augustan age. At this time, Saxony was one of the more important powers in Europe. The Dresden Baroque reached its peak in the residential city of Dresden, and the Dresden art collections achieved European-wide importance. The end of the Augustan Age is considered to be the conclusion of the Treaty of Dresden in 1745 or the end of the Seven Years' War in 1763, which almost coincided with the death of King Augustus III and thus the end of the Saxon-Polish personal union.

The union resulted in increased contacts between Poles and Sorbs, coincidentally at a time when the Sorbian national revival began and resistance to Germanization emerged. Polish dignitaries traveled through Lusatia on their way between Dresden and Warsaw, encountering Sorbs, and some Polish nobles owned estates in Lusatia. Polish and Sorbian students established contacts at the University of Leipzig, and Polish students inspired the activities of their Sorbian counterparts.

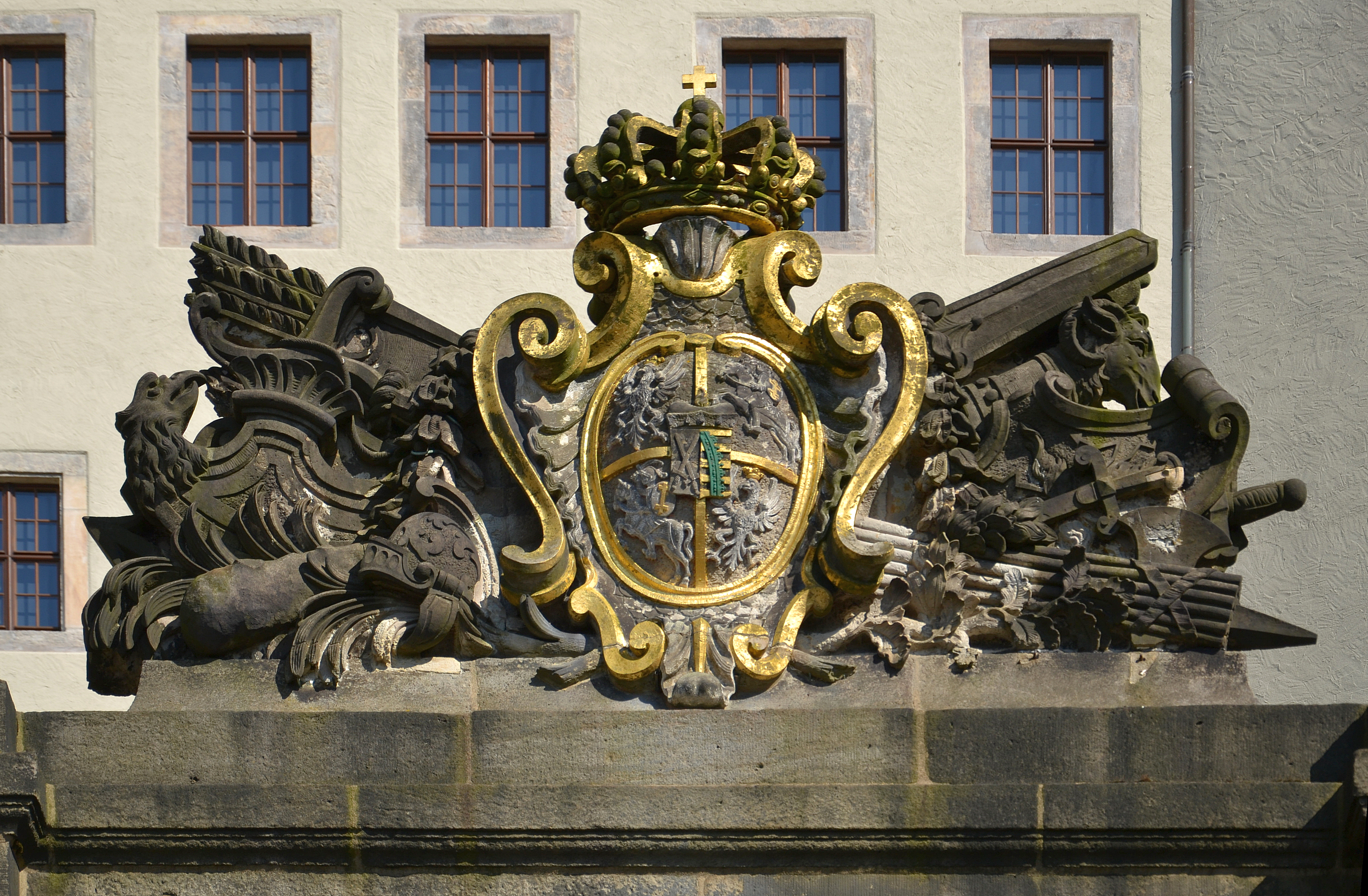
Coat of arms of Poland-Saxony at the Königstein Fortress entrance gate

Numerous landmarks in Saxony, including the Zwinger, Dresden Cathedral, Japanisches Palais, Moritzburg Castle and Königstein Fortress are decorated with reliefs containing the coat of arms of Poland-Saxony. A distinct remnant of the union are the 18th-century mileposts decorated with the coats of arms of Poland and Saxony and Polish royal cyphers, located in various towns in present-day eastern Germany and south-western Poland.

== Aftermath ==
The Constitution of 3 May 1791, passed by the Sejm as a result of the First Partition of Poland, stipulated that the respective “ruling Elector of Saxony should rule as king in Poland”. Elector Frederick Augustus III, however, due to the political situation, renounced the Polish crown.

In 1793, preparations for the Polish Kościuszko Uprising were initiated by Tadeusz Kościuszko in Dresden in response to the Second Partition of Poland.

Through Napoleon and the Confederation of the Rhine, the Saxon Electorate became a kingdom in 1806, and in 1807 Frederick Augustus I was also named Duke of Warsaw. The constitution dictated by Napoleon for the Duchy of Warsaw linked it hereditarily to the Saxon royal family, but ended along with Napoleon's power in 1815.

After the failed November Uprising in 1830, many Polish refugees and emigrants came to Saxony, whose graves can still be found, for example, in the Old Catholic Cemetery in Dresden, founded by Augustus II the Strong. Saxony willingly accepted the refugees. Polish refugees included the artistic and political elite, such as composer Frédéric Chopin, war hero Józef Bem and writer Adam Mickiewicz. Mickiewicz wrote one of his greatest works, Dziady, Part III, there. Poet and activist Wawrzyniec Benzelstjerna Engeström founded the Notatki Drezdeńskie Polish newspaper in Dresden. During the Polish uprisings against Russian, Prussian and Austrian rule between 1830 and 1863, prayers were publicly held in Dresden for a Polish victory.

The Polish communities of Dresden and Leipzig remained active until the 1930s. Polish-language church services in Dresden were cancelled only in 1932. During the German invasion of Poland, which started World War II in September 1939, the Nazis carried out mass arrests of Polish activists in the two cities (see also Nazi crimes against the Polish nation).

== Literature ==
- Hans-Jürgen Bömelburg: Die Wettiner und die sächsischen Eliten in Polen-Litauen. In: Ronald G. Asch (publ.): Hannover, Großbritannien und Europa. Erfahrungsraum Personalunion 1714–1837 (= Veröffentlichungen der Historischen Kommission für Niedersachsen und Bremen 277). Wallstein-Verlag, Göttingen 2014, ISBN 978-3-8353-1584-6, p. 118–145.
- Norman Davies: God's Playground: The Origins to 1795 – A History of Poland. Oxford University Press, New York 2005, ISBN 0-19-925339-0.
- René Hanke: Brühl und das Renversement des alliances. Die antipreußische Außenpolitik des Dresdener Hofes 1744–1756. Lit, Berlin 2006, ISBN 3-8258-9455-X.
- Frank-Lothar Kroll, Hendrik Thoß (publ.): Zwei Staaten, eine Krone. Die polnisch-sächsische Union 1697-1763. be.bra wissenschaft verlag, Berlin 2016, ISBN 3-95410-057-6.
- Rex Rexheuser (publ.): Die Personalunionen von Sachsen-Polen 1697-1763 und Hannover-England 1714-1837. Ein Vergleich. Harrassowitz Verlag, Wiesbaden 2005 (online).
