= Stefan Ledóchowski =

Polish official

Stefan Ledóchowski, Szaława coat of arms (died 1732), was Volhynian Podstoli in the years 1720–1727.

In 1729 he was member of parliament in Volhynian Voivodeship in Polish–Lithuanian Commonwealth.

== Bibliography ==
- Urzędnicy wołyńscy XIV-XVIII wieku. Spisy. Oprac. Marian Wolski, Kórnik 2007, page 170.
- Teka Gabryela Junoszy Podoskiego, volume III, Poznań 1856, page 303.
