= Ledóchowski =

Polish noble family

- Szaława coat of arms
- Origin: Lidykhiv (Volhynia)

The Ledóchowski family (feminine form: Ledóchowska, plural: Ledóchowscy; Ukrainian: Ледуховські) is a Ruthenian, Polish and Austrian noble family of Ruthenian origin from Volhynia. Members of the family have over the centuries distinguished themselves through services to the Catholic Church, the Austrian Crown as well as the Polish Crown.

== History ==
The Ledóchowski family lineage begins in 1457 in the Volhynian Voivodeship of the Commonwealth of the Crown of the Polish Kingdom, where the boyar knight Nestor Halka took the name of his estate, Ledochow, as his own. It is said that the boyar dynastic family Halka family draw their origins to the times of the Kievan Rus in 971 As direct descendants of these boyar knights, members of the Ledóchowski family bear the same Coat of Arms with the name Szalawa (Herb Szalawa). Their descendance from the Halka Family was further reflected by the official Austrian title of Halka von Ledóchow Count Ledóchowski. The family was Orthodox until the 17th century.

After the partition of Poland in the late 18th century, the country was carved up between Austria, Germany and Russia. Antoni Halka von Ledóchow Count Ledóchowski (1755–1835), also known simply as Count Antoni Halka-Ledóchowski, obtained the hereditary title of Count in Austria from Emperor Francis II on 8 May 1800. The title was confirmed in the Kingdom of Poland in 1824, and in Russia on 18 May 1845.

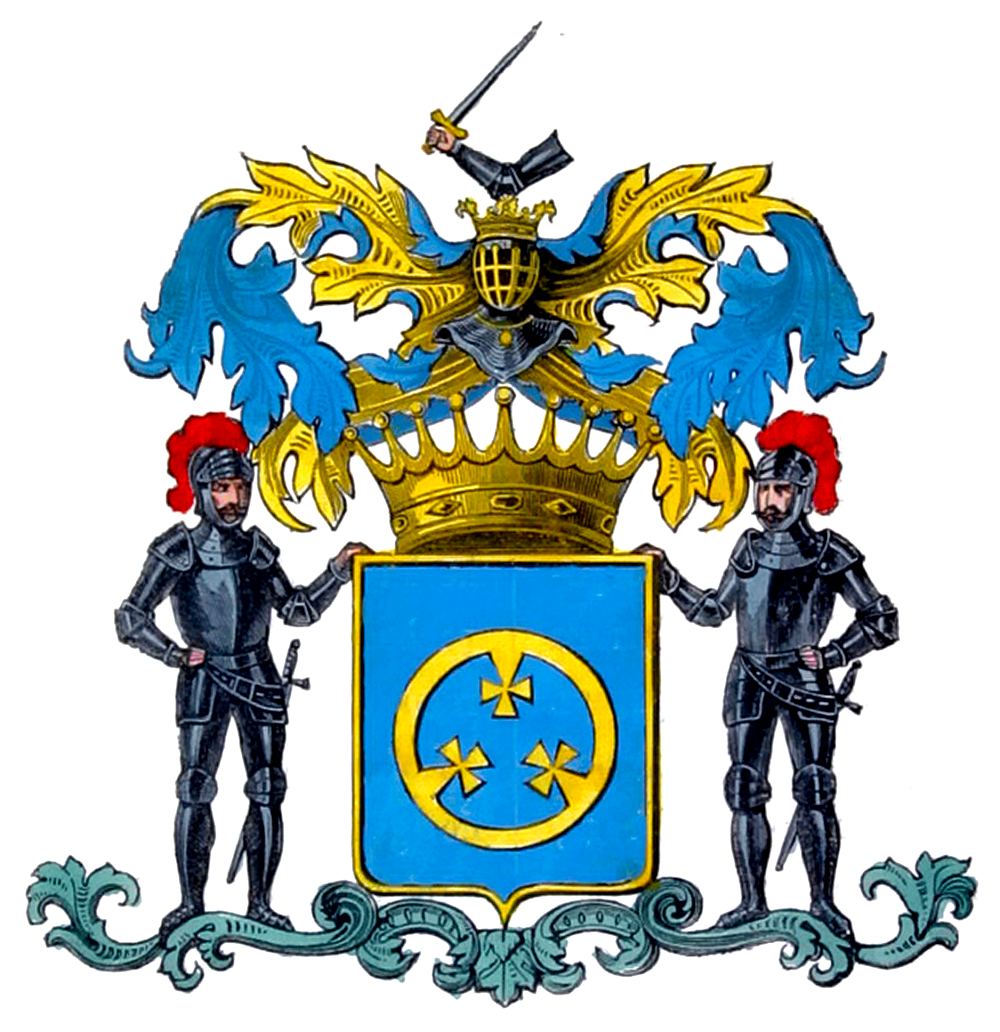
Coat of Arms of the Count Ledóchowski

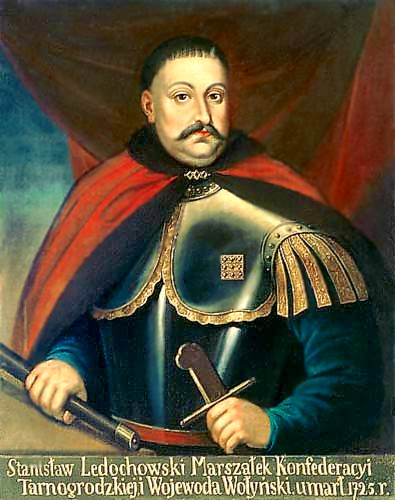
Stanislaw Ledóchowski

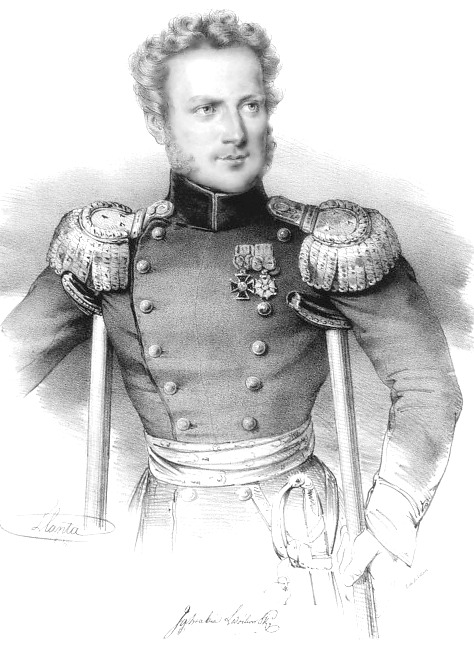
Ignacy Hilary Ledóchowski I

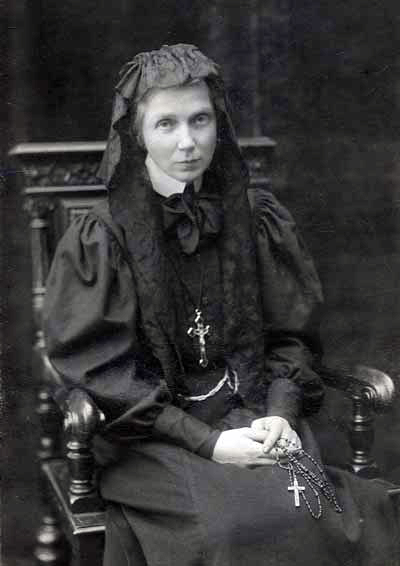
Saint Ursula Ledóchowska

Members of this family have distinguished themselves with their services to the:

- Roman Catholic Church (Mieczysław Cardinal Ledóchwski, Jesuit General Wlodzimierz Ledóchowski, Saint Ursula Ledóchowska and the Blessed Maria Teresia Ledóchowska)
- Austrian Crown (see Wladimir Count Ledóchowski, equerry to the last Austrian Emperor; Timoteusz Count Ledóchowski, teacher/mentor of Emperor Franz Joseph; Josef Count Ledóchowski, Officer in the Austrian Chief of Staff)
- Polish Crown/patriots (Stanislaus Ledóchowski, Marshal of the Tarnogród Confederation; General Ignacy Count Ledóchowski, Commander of the Fortress Modlin; Jan Halka Ledóchowski, Parliamentarian and Polish Revolutionary; General Ignaz Count Ledóchowski)

== Historical Museum of Warsaw ==
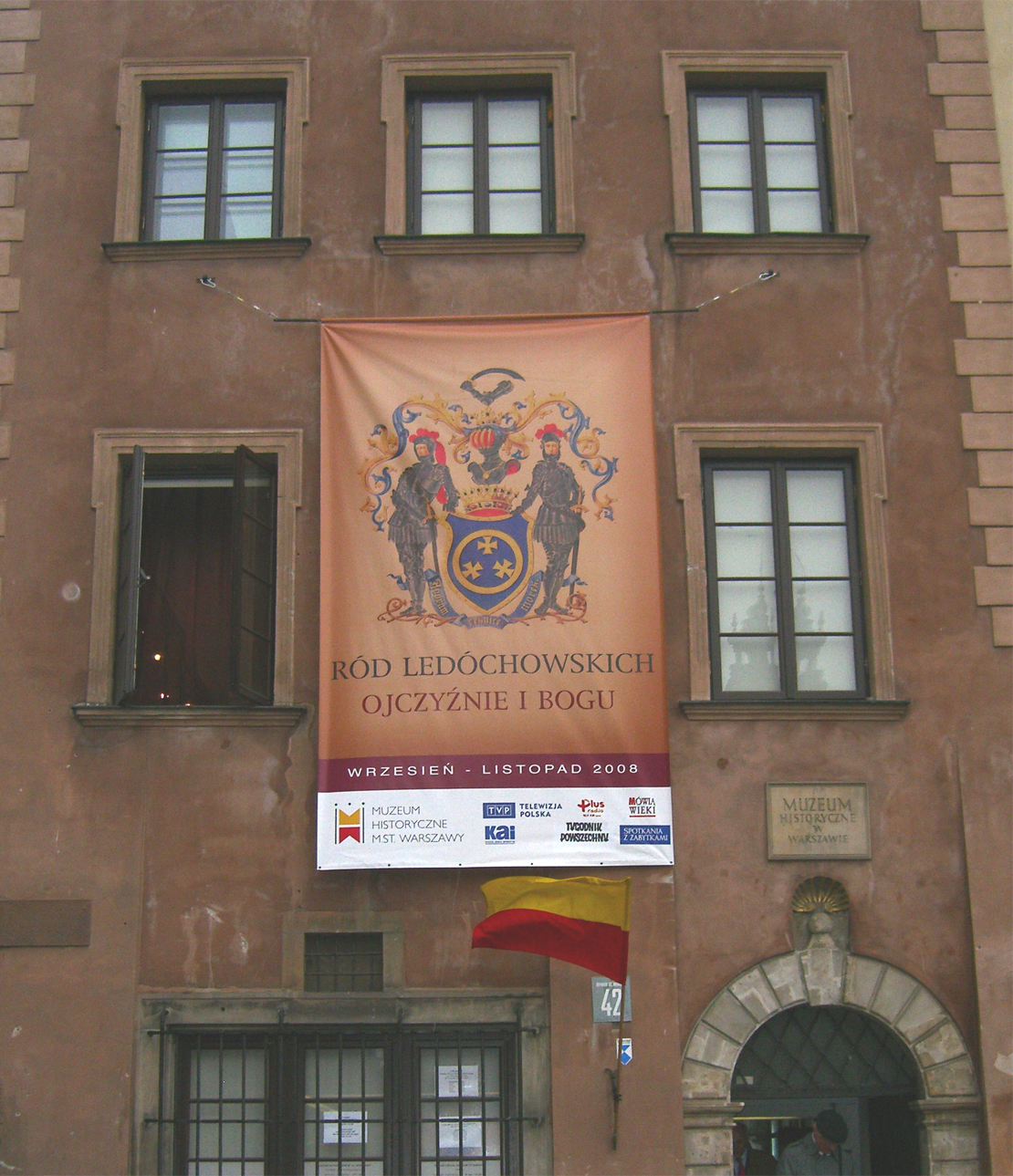
Ledóchowski Family Exhibition at the Historical Museum Warsaw in 2008

The Historical Museum of Warsaw sponsored a temporary exhibition of the Ledóchowski family in October 2008. The Patrons of the Exhibition include Austrian President Heinz Fischer and President of Poland Lech Kaczyński. Historical Documents and Portraits were lent on a temporary basis to the museum by family members living in Europe.

== Present day ==
Members of the noble family Ledochowski currently live and flourish in Austria, Poland and the United Kingdom. There are however other thriving families carrying this name or variations thereof who are not related to this noble family. It's worth noting that peasant families who were somehow associated with the townships of Ledochow or Leduchowka (present day Ukraine) may have ended up with this surname.

== Notable members of the Ledóchowski family ==
- Blessed Maria Teresia Halka Countess Ledóchowska (1863–1922)
- Saint Ursula Halka Countess Ledóchowska (1865–1939) (sister of Maria Teresia)
- Wlodzimierz Halka Count Ledóchowski (1866–1942), Jesuit General (brother of Ursula)
- Count Antoni Halka-Ledóchowski (1755–1835), Starosta of Haisyn
- Count Stanisław Ledóchowski (Russian : Станислав Ледуховский) his portrait is in the state Museum of Saint-Petersburg painter Johann Baptist von Lampi; father of Marianne Ledóchowska (Russian : Мария Станиславовна Ледуховская) (1816-?)
- General Ignacy Halka Count Ledóchowski (1789–1870), Commander of the Fortress Modlin
- General Ignacy Halka Count Ledóchowski(1871–1945), political prisoner during WWII/Holocaust victim
- Antoni Maria Józef Maksymilian Count Halka-Ledóchowski (1895 - 1972), Master Mariner, one of organizers and first professors (since 1920) of the Maritime School (Państwowa Szkoła Morska) in Tczew, Poland
- Igor-Alexander Halka Count Ledóchowski (born 1974), Hypnotist, Former Solicitor & Author
- Cardinal Mieczysław Halka Count Ledóchowski (1822–1902)
- Stanisław Ledóchowski(1666–1725) Marshall of the Senate, voivod of the Volhynian Voivodship and Marshall of the Tarnogród Confederation
- Ignacy Władysław Ledóchowski (1867-1932), architect and civil engineer who worked in Kyiv, Russian Empire at the beginning of the 20th century.
- Lech Count Ledóchowski (1955), tennis player
- Maximilian Count Ledóchowski (1956), M.D., medical writer. (https://de.wikipedia.org/wiki/Maximilian_Ledochowski)

== Popular culture ==
- In Pyotr Krasnov's historical semi-biographical trilogy "From Double Eagle To the Red Flag", its hero General Sablin is a Guest at the Manor House of Count Ledokhovski. The difference in spelling can be attributed to a mis-translation of the Cyrillic spelling of the name Ledóchowski.
- In Joseph Roth's historical novels dealing with the dying days of the Austrian-Hungarian Empire "The Emperor's Tomb" and "The Radetzky March". two members of the Ledóchowski family have walk on parts.
- In John Gallahue's fictional account of an ill-fated clandestine operation in Soviet Russia the reader is introduced to the Jesuit General Wladimir Ledóchowski.

== Sources ==
- Baracz, Sadok. „Pamiętnik szlachetnego Ledochowskich domu“ Lwów, 1879
- Gothaisches Genealogisches Taschenbuch der Gräflichen Häuser/1840
- Halka-Ledochówski, Sigismund. Das Buch von meiner Lebensfahrt, Prag 1934-1935
- Niesiecki, Kaspar. „Herbarz Polski“ 1839-1845 Tom VI pp. 32–38
- Niesiecki, Kaspar. „Herbarz Polski“ 1839-1845 Tom VIII pp. 393–94
- William F. Hoffman info re Ledóchowski family
- Petr Nikolaevich Krasnov; Erik Law-Gisiko (1926). From Double Eagle to Red Flag. Duffield.
- Roth, Joseph (2010). La cripta dei cappuccini. Baldini Castoldi Dalai Edito. p. 195. ISBN 978-88-6073-905-6.
- Roth, Joseph (2010). La marcia di Radetzky. Baldini Castoldi Dalai Edito. p. 162. ISBN 978-88-6073-906-3.
- Gallahue, John (1973). The Jesuit. Stein and Day. p. 113. ISBN 978-0-8128-1531-3.
