= Pacification sejm =

Pacification sejm (Polish: Sejm pacyfikacyjny) refers to a type of the sejm (parliament session) in the Polish–Lithuanian Commonwealth. The pacification sejms were held after a period of conflict to bring peace and unity to the country, usually after a disputed royal election. Pacification sejms were held in 1589, 1673, 1698, 1699, 1717 and 1736.
