= Ignacy Ledóchowski I =

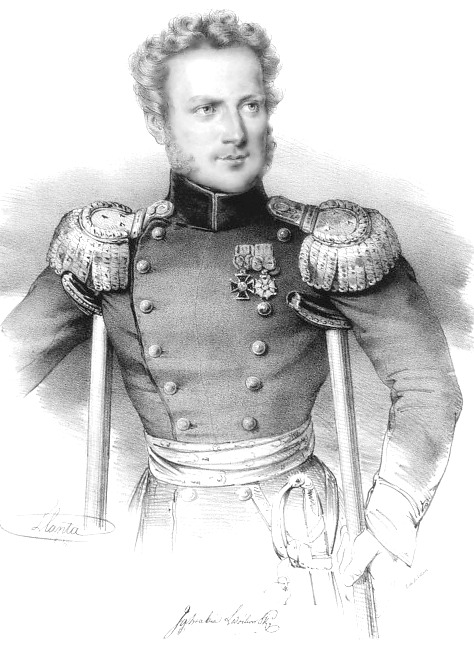
Ignacy Hilary Ledóchowski

Ignacy Hilary Halka Count Ledóchowski (13 January 1789, Krupa – 29 March 1870, Klimontów) was an Austrian as well as Polish General, a scion of the Ledóchowski family and Commander of the Modlin Fortress.

Ledóchowski was the son of Antoni Halka Count Ledóchowski (1755–1835).
