= Tarnogród Confederation =

18th century confederation of Polish nobles

The Tarnogród Confederation was a confederation of szlachta in Polish–Lithuanian Commonwealth, in the years 1715–1716. It was formed on 26 November 1715 in Tarnogród by nobility angered by illegal taxation, levied for Saxon forces operating in Grand Duchy of Lithuania on behalf of Augustus II the Strong, who wanted to introduce absolute monarchy in the Commonwealth. Its marshal was Stanisław Ledóchowski. The confederates and the royal forces did not fight any decisive battles, but they fought numerous smaller skirmishes; several towns and castles were taken. The ensuing negotiations eventually brought Peter I of Russia and Russian Empire forces into the Commonwealth "for peacekeeping and mediation". This event marked the beginning of lasting Russian Empire influence on Commonwealth internal affairs, starting with the Silent Sejm of 1717.

== Background ==
Augustus II the Strong of the Saxony's House of Wettin was elected to the throne of Poland in 1697. The Wettins, used to absolute rule, attempted to govern through intimidation and the use of force, which led to the a series of conflicts between Wettin supporters and opponents (including another pretender to the Polish throne, King Stanisław Leszczyński). Those conflicts often took the form of the confederations – legal rebellions against the king permitted under the Golden Freedoms.

Augustus II wanted to strengthen the royal power in the Commonwealth; to reinforce his position, he brought in troops from Saxony (by the summer of 1714 more than 25,000 Saxon troops were inside Commonwealth's borders), which produced dissent in the Commonwealth. Meanwhile, in the aftermath of the Great Northern War, which marked the rise of the Russian Empire (1721), the growing conflict between Augustus II and the Polish nobility (szlachta) was used by the powerful Russian Tsar Peter the Great, victor of the Great Northern War. At that time, Russia was not yet strong enough to conquer and absorb the Commonwealth outright, nor could it easily and openly assume control of it, despite the Commonwealth's dysfunctional politics; the "Polish anarchy" was not easy to rule. Hence Peter's goal was to weaken both sides, and prevent Augustus from strengthening his position, which he feared would lead to a resurgent Commonwealth that could threaten Russia's recent gains and growing influence in the Commonwealth internal politics. He further hoped and succeeding in forcing through conditions (such as reduction of the Commonwealth army's size) that would increase Commonwealth inferiority compared to Russia. Peter used Augustus II recent policies, aiming at the reduction of power of the hetmans (Polish-Lithuanian military commanders in chief), coinciding with the bad harvest and some Polish-French negotiations, to stir opposition to Augustus.

== Hostilities ==
The nobles, spurred by Russian promises of support, formed the Tarnogród Confederation on 26 November 1715. The Confederation's marshal was Stanisław Ledóchowski. The Tarnogród Confederation was only the last and most notable of several confederations formed against Augustus at that time. The Confederates were supported by most of the Commonwealth's own army. Great Crown and Great Lithuanian Hetmans, Adam Mikołaj Sieniawski and Ludwik Konstanty Pociej, respectively, did not join the Confederation, but neither did they help the king.

The Russians entered the country, but did not participate in any major engagements, and in fact they bid their time, as Peter posed as the conciliator between the Commonwealth king and the szlachta. Crucially, the Russians did not support the Confederates as promised, and instead insisted on bringing both sides to the negotiating table. The civil war lasted for a year; and the outcome hung in the balance. Saxon forces under command of Jacob Heinrich von Flemming enjoyed military superiority, and advanced south-eastwards, taking Zamość (this victory was however accomplished less through military tactics than through diplomacy and a treachery). In January, negotiations in Rawa Ruska led to a temporary ceasefire, but it did not hold, particularly as the Russians encouraged the Confederates to be more aggressive. The confederates pushed back against Augustus forces, entering Wielkopolska, and taking Poznań. They gained support from a local Wielkopolska confederation, and from Lithuania. Neither side was however posed to take victory, and the Russian pressure mounted; eventually the Russians declared that they will consider any side that does not enter negotiations an enemy and open hostilities with them.

Unable to defeat the Confederates, many of whom still saw Peter as protector of their rights (and some of whom hoped for Augustus to be deposed), Augustus agreed to open the negotiations with Russians acting as arbitrators. Earlier, he hoped for the arbitration from the Pope, the Holy Roman Emperor or the Ottoman Empire, but the Pope was not trusted by the Confederates, and the Holy Roman Emperor and the Ottomans were concerned with hostilities between themselves. The Russians were represented by a delegation headed by prince Gregory Dolgoruky. Negotiations took place in June in Lublin, but were broken once again when the Confederates took Poznań, and the Saxons captured and executed one of the Confederation leaders, Mikołaj Łaściszewski. In August, Augustus requested Russian assistance, and new round of negotiations begun. The defeat of the confederate forces in the battle of Kowalewo increased their will to negotiate. A peace treaty between Confederates and the Augustus was signed on 3 or 4 November 1716, as relations between the Confederates and the Russians deteriorated, as Russians made it increasingly apparent that their goals were not totally benign to the Commonwealth. Finally, a Sejm session was called for 1 February 1717.

== Aftermath and significance ==
The Silent Sejm that was held in the aftermath of the hostilities gained notoriety in Polish history and politics. While some beneficial reforms were passed (such as the establishment of standing taxes for the military), the Sejm is regarded negatively by modern historians. Reduction of the army's size and establishment of Russia's position as the settlement guarantor reinforced Commonwealth military inferiority compared to its neighbors, and unofficially, put it in the position of a Russian protectorate. The Russian tsar as the guarantor had now a convenient excuse to intervene in Polish politics in the future at will. With a reduced army, removal of Saxon troops and the right to form confederations, the nobility and the king had less power to fight one another – or, not incidentally, to resist the outside forces. Russian Army troops would stay in the Commonwealth for two years, supporting opposition to Augustus; and Russia soon reached an agreement with other powers about stopping further attempts to reform and strengthen the Commonwealth. Thus the Silent Sejm is regarded as one of the first precedences that the Russian Empire dictated Polish internal policy, and also as a precursor to the partitions of Poland, which erased the Commonwealth from world maps by 1795. Historian Norman Davies wrote that this Sejm "effectively terminated the independence of Poland and Lithuania".

The system created by the Silent Sejm dominated the Polish political scene until the late 18th century, when a new wave of reforms led to the Constitution of 3 May 1791, soon followed by partitions of Poland and loss of Polish sovereignty for 123 years.
