= Danilevich =

Danilevich is the East-Slavic language variant of the Polish-language surname Danilewicz originated in the noble Danielewicz family.

Notable people with the surname include:

- Vladimir Danilevich (1924–2001), Soviet and Russian animator
