= Silent Sejm =

Parliamentary session of Polish–Lithuanian Commonwealth

Silent Sejm (Polish: Sejm Niemy), also known as the Mute Sejm, is the name given to the session of the Sejm parliament of the Polish–Lithuanian Commonwealth of 1 February 1717 held in Warsaw. A civil war in the Commonwealth was used by the Russian Tsar Peter the Great as an opportunity to intervene as a mediator. It marked the end of Augustus II of Poland's attempts to create an absolute monarchy in Poland, and the beginning of the Russian Empire's increasing influence and control over the Commonwealth.

== Background ==
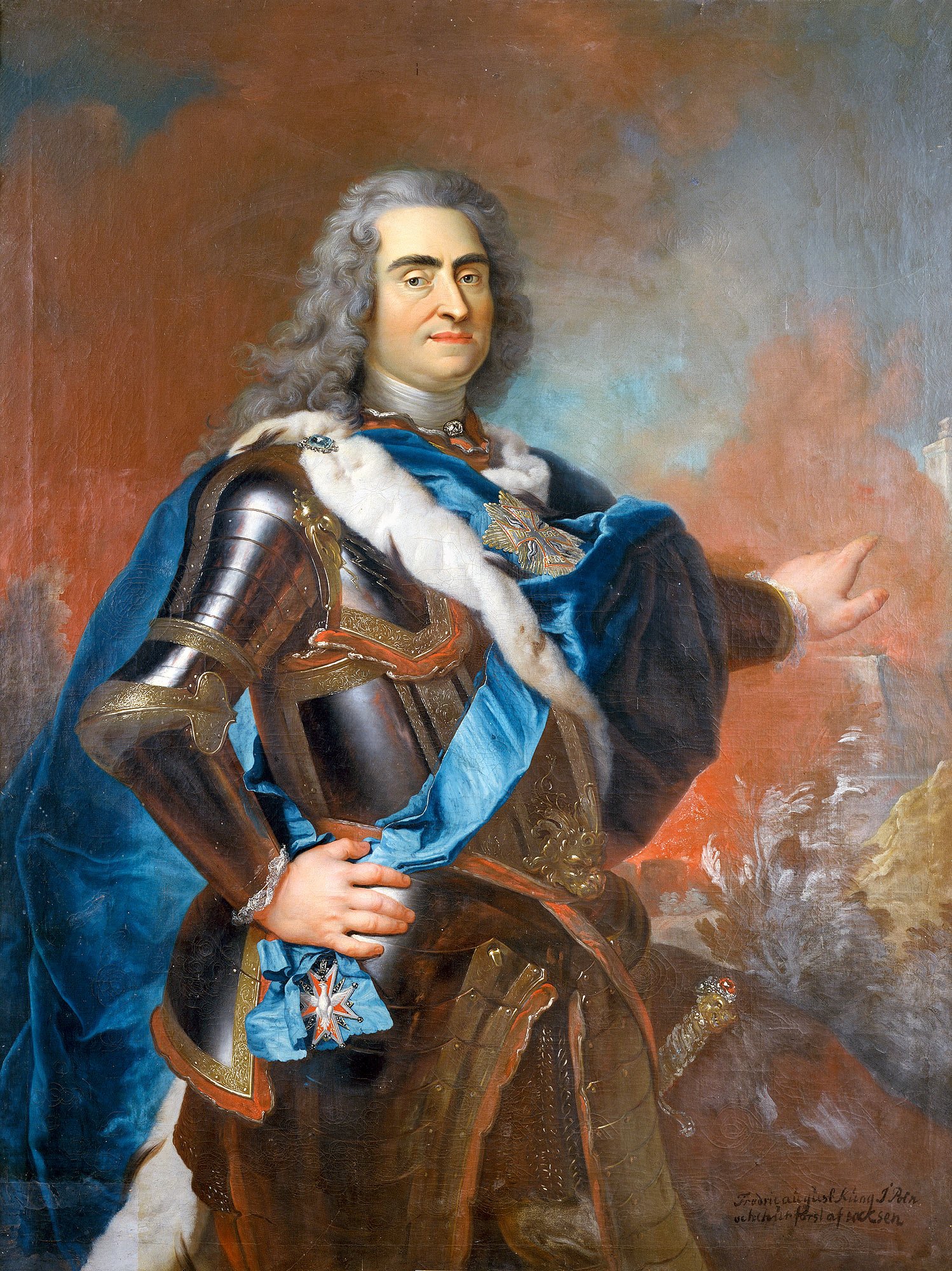
Augustus II of Poland

Augustus II the Strong of the Saxon House of Wettin was elected to the throne of Poland in 1697. The Wettins, used to absolute rule, attempted to govern through intimidation and the use of force, which led to a series of conflicts between Wettin supporters and opponents (including another pretender to the Polish throne, King Stanisław Leszczyński). Those conflicts often took the form of confederations – legal rebellions against the king permitted under the Golden Freedoms.

Augustus II wanted to strengthen royal power in the Commonwealth and to that end he brought in troops from Saxony (by the summer of 1714 more than 25,000 Saxon troops were inside Commonwealth's borders). This produced dissent within the Commonwealth. Meanwhile, in the aftermath of the Great Northern War, which marked the rise of the Russian Empire (1721), the growing conflict between Augustus II and the Polish nobility (szlachta) was used by the powerful Russian Tsar Peter the Great, victor of the Great Northern War. At the time Russia was not yet strong enough to conquer and absorb the Commonwealth outright, nor could it easily and openly assume control of it, despite the Commonwealth's dysfunctional politics; the "Polish anarchy" was not to be easily governed. Hence Peter's goal was to weaken both sides, and to prevent Augustus from strengthening his position, which he feared would lead to a resurgent Commonwealth that could threaten Russia's recent gains and growing influence. He succeeded in forcing through conditions (such as reduction of the Commonwealth army's size) that decreased the Commonwealth's political status relative to Russia. Peter used Augustus' recent policies, aiming at the reduction of power of the hetmans (Polish military commanders in chief), as well as the occurrence of a bad harvest and some Polish-French negotiations, to stir opposition to Augustus.

== Tarnogród Confederation ==
The nobles, spurred by Russian promises of support, formed the Tarnogród Confederation on 26 November 1715. The Confederation's marshal was Stanisław Ledóchowski. The Tarnogród Confederation was only the last and most notable of several confederations formed against Augustus at that time. The Confederates were supported by most of the Commonwealth's own army.

The Russians entered the country, but did not participate in any major engagements. They bided their time, as Peter posed as the mediator between the Commonwealth's king and its szlachta. Crucially, the Russians did not support the Confederates as promised, and instead insisted on bringing both sides to the negotiating table. The civil war lasted for a year and the outcome hung in the balance. Saxon forces under the command of Jacob Heinrich von Flemming enjoyed military superiority, advanced south-eastwards and took Zamość (this victory was however accomplished less through military tactics than through diplomacy and a treachery). The confederates then pushed back, entered Wielkopolska, and took Poznań. They gained some support from a local Wielkopolska confederation and from Lithuania. Neither side was however posed to achieve victory, and the Russian pressure mounted; eventually the Russians declared that they would consider any side that refused to enter into negotiations an enemy, and open hostilities against them. Unable to defeat the Confederates, many of whom still saw Peter as the protector of their rights (and some of whom hoped for Augustus to be deposed), Augustus agreed to open the negotiations with Russians acting as arbitrators. The Russians were represented by a delegation headed by prince Grigori Dolgorukov (1657–1723). A peace treaty between the Confederates and the Augustus was signed on 3 or 4 November 1716, as relations between the Confederates and the Russians deteriorated. The Russians made it increasingly apparent that their goals were not wholly benign to the Commonwealth. Finally, a Sejm session was called for 1 February 1717.

== Sejm ==
To prevent the use of liberum veto from disrupting Sejm proceedings, the session was turned into a confederated sejm. (It was also a pacification sejm). Threatened by a strong Russian army, with Russian soldiers "guarding" the proceedings, the Silent Sejm was known as such because only the speaker (marshal of the Sejm) Stanisław Ledóchowski (podkomorzy krzemienicki), and a few selected other deputies were allowed a voice, outlining the terms of the settlement. Other names for the Sejm in the English language include Dumb or Muted. The terms themselves were significantly designed by Peter the Great. The Sejm lasted for one day only, or more precisely, six hours.

This settlement stipulated that:

- Tarnogród Confederation (and older, Sandomierz Confederation) were dissolved;
- the right to form confederations in the future was abolished;
- Golden Freedoms (Cardinal Laws) are reaffirmed (in particular, liberum veto still held);
- the king was not to imprison people based on his whim (reaffirmation of the neminem captivabimus);
- the king had to avoid offensive wars;
- Poles and Saxony (Augustus' homeland) should not intervene into each other's domestic affairs (the king had to avoid negotiations on Polish affairs with foreign (Saxonian) powers);
- hetmans and sejmiks (local parliaments) had lost some of their prerogatives (notably, sejmiks no longer could change local taxation);
- Saxony troops stationed in Poland were to be significantly limited in size (banished totally, or reduced to 1,200 of royal guard, which no further foreign recruits allowed)
- Saxon officials were to be removed from Poland (or were limited to six) and the king was to not give any further offices to foreign officials;
- the rights of Protestants in Poland were curtailed (some Protestant churches were to be demolished to punish "Swedish partisans")
- establishment of an estimate of the state's income and expenditure (in essence, a budget, one of the first in Europe)
- established taxes for Commonwealth army (consuming over 90% of the state's income);
- the army was to be billeted on the crown estates;
- reduction of the army to 24,000 (or 18,000, or 16,000 – sources vary) for Poland and 6,000 (or 8,000) for Lithuania. An army of that size was insufficient to protect the Commonwealth; a normal soldier's wages meant that after factoring officer pensions and other military needs, the effective army was perhaps 12,000 strong, several times weaker than those of its neighbours – at that time the Russian army numbered 300,000;

Sources vary whether Russia was recognized as the power that would guarantee the settlement; this claim is made by Jacek Jędruch and Norman Davies, but rejected by Jacek Staszewski and explicitly noted as erroneous in the edited work by Zbigniew Wójcik.

== Aftermath and significance ==
The Silent Sejm marked the end of Augustus II's attempts to create an absolute monarchy in Poland; he subsequently focused his efforts on securing the succession of his son to the Polish throne.

While some beneficial reforms were passed (such as the establishment of standing taxes for the military), the Sejm is regarded negatively by modern historians. The reduction in the size of the army and the establishment of Russia's position as the settlement's proposed (even if rejected) guarantor reinforced Commonwealth military inferiority compared to its neighbors, and unofficially, put it in the position of a Russian protectorate. The Russian tsar, as the proposed guarantor, now had a convenient excuse to intervene in Polish politics at will. With a reduced army, removal of Saxon troops and the right to form confederations, the nobility and the king had less power to fight one another – or, not coincidentally, to resist outside forces. Russian troops remained in the Commonwealth for two years, supporting opposition to Augustus, and Russia soon reached an agreement with other powers to put an end to further attempts at the reform and strengthening of the Commonwealth. Thus the Silent Sejm is regarded as one of the first precedents for the Russian Empire dictating Polish internal policy, and a precursor to the partitions of Poland, which erased the Commonwealth from world maps by 1795. Historian Norman Davies wrote that this Sejm "effectively terminated the independence of Poland and Lithuania".

The system created by the Silent Sejm dominated the Polish political scene until the late 18th century, when a new wave of reforms led to the Constitution of the 3 May, soon followed by partitions of Poland and loss of Polish sovereignty for 123 years.

== Notes ==
a Through some sources claim that the entire Sejm was silent, or that only Ledóchowski spoke, in fact several people spoke during the Sejm. Józef Szujski notes that the Sejm begun with a long speech by Ledóchowski, that other marshals of provincial confederations were allowed to speak in order to renounce their positions, that the chancellor Jan Sebastian Szembek was able to reply to them, and that the deputy and commissar Michał Potocki read the constitution and relevant treaties. At the same time, the sources agree that most of the deputies were prevented from speaking; Szujski notes that hetman Stanisław Mateusz Rzewuski was refused the right to speak. Archbishop of Gniezno and primate of Poland, Stanisław Szembek, "stormed out in a fury", complaining about being not allowed to voice his position in the discussion.

== See also ==
- Grodno Sejm
