= Stanisław Ledóchowski =

Polish marshal (1666–1725)

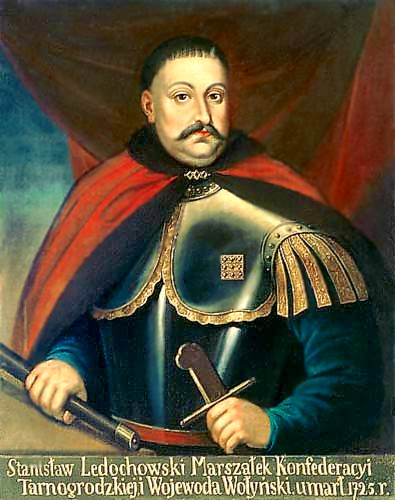
Stanislaw Ledóchowski

Stanisław Ledóchowski (1666–1725) was a Polish marshal of the Crown Tribunal (1701), member of the Sandomierz Confederation of 1704, marshal of the Tarnogród Confederation (1715–1716), marshal of the Sejm during Sejm Niemy of 1717.

Stanisław Ledóchowski began serving his country under the leadership of King Jan III Sobieski. In 1683, as an 18-year-old young man he took part, together with his two brothers, Felicjan and Kazimierz, in the relief of Vienna. After his return to Poland Stanisław embarked on an exceptional political and military career – he was Marshall of the Senate, voivod of the Volhynian Voivodship and Marshall of the Tarnogród Confederation.

Stanisław Ledóchowski was a prominent member of the Ledóchowski family.
