= Szaława coat of arms =

Polish coat of arms

Szaława
- Alternative names: Salava, Sielawa
- Families: Alkiewicz, Chalkowski, Gałko, Gałkowski, Halk, Halka, Halko, Halkiew, Jakuszewski, Kuczyński, Ledóchowski, Leduchowski, Łebiński, Nawrotyński, Nowojski, Romanowski, Skoryna, Strzyż, Świrski

Szaława is a Polish coat of arms. It was used by several szlachta families in the times of the Polish–Lithuanian Commonwealth.

== Blazon ==
Azure, within and conjoined to an annulet three crosses formy in pall inverted Or.

== Notable bearers ==
Notable bearers of this coat of arms include:

== See also ==
- Polish heraldry
- Heraldry
- Coat of arms
- List of Polish nobility coats of arms

== Sources ==
- Dynastic Genealogy
- Tadeusz Gajl Herby szlacheckie Rzeczypospolitej Obojga Narodów
- Some surnames of the list are copy from Polish Wikipedia: Szaława (herb szlachecki) - see Polish link.
