= History of the Polish–Lithuanian Commonwealth (1764–1795) =

The History of the Polish–Lithuanian Commonwealth (1764–1795) is concerned with the final decades of existence of the Polish–Lithuanian Commonwealth. The period, during which the declining state pursued wide-ranging reforms and was subjected to three partitions by the neighboring powers, coincides with the election and reign of the federation's last king, Stanisław August Poniatowski.

During the later part of the 18th century, the Commonwealth attempted fundamental internal reforms. The reform activity provoked hostile reaction and eventually military response on the part of the surrounding states. The second half of the century brought improved economy and significant growth of the population. The most populous capital city of Warsaw replaced Danzig (Gdańsk) as the leading trade center, and the role of the more prosperous urban strata was increasing. The last decades of the independent Commonwealth existence were characterized by intense reform movements and far-reaching progress in the areas of education, intellectual life, arts and sciences, and especially toward the end of the period, evolution of the social and political system.

The royal election of 1764 resulted in the elevation of Stanisław August Poniatowski, a refined and worldly aristocrat connected to a major magnate faction, but hand-picked and imposed by Empress Catherine II of Russia, who expected Poniatowski to be her obedient follower. The King accordingly spent his reign torn between his desire to implement reforms necessary to save the state, and his perceived necessity of remaining in subordinate relationship with his Russian sponsors. The Bar Confederation of 1768 was a szlachta rebellion directed against Russia and the Polish king, fought to preserve Poland's independence and in support of szlachta's traditional causes. It was brought under control and followed in 1772 by the First Partition of the Commonwealth, a permanent encroachment on the outer Commonwealth provinces by the Russian Empire, the Kingdom of Prussia and Habsburg Austria. The "Partition Sejm" under duress "ratified" the partition fait accompli. In 1773 the Sejm established the Commission of National Education, a pioneering in Europe government education authority.

The long-lasting sejm convened by Stanisław August in 1788 is known as the Great, or Four-Year Sejm. The Sejm's landmark achievement was the passing of the May 3 Constitution, the first in modern Europe singular pronouncement of a supreme law of the state. The reformist but moderate document, accused by detractors of French Revolution sympathies, soon generated strong opposition coming from the Commonwealth's upper nobility conservative circles and Catherine II, determined to prevent a rebirth of a strong Commonwealth. The nobility's Targowica Confederation appealed to the Empress for help and in May 1792 the Russian army entered the territory of the Commonwealth. The defensive war fought by the forces of the Commonwealth ended when the King, convinced of the futility of resistance, capitulated by joining the Targowica Confederation. The Confederation took over the government, but Russia and Prussia in 1793 arranged for and executed the Second Partition of the Commonwealth, which left the country with critically reduced territory, practically incapable of independent existence.

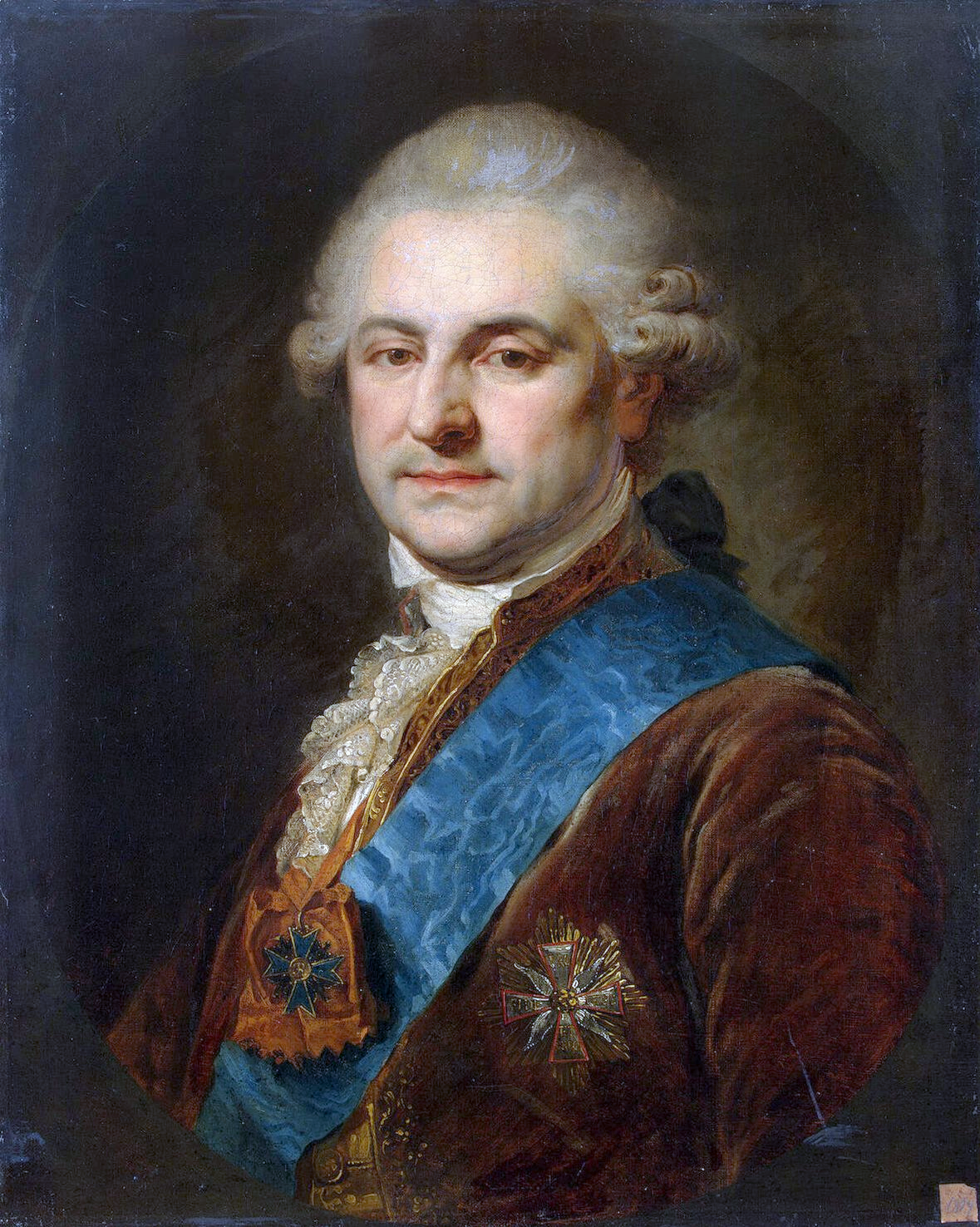
King Stanisław August Poniatowski unwillingly presided over the dissolution of the Polish–Lithuanian Commonwealth

The radicalized by the recent events reformers, in the still nominally Commonwealth area and in exile, were soon working on national insurrection preparations. Tadeusz Kościuszko was chosen as its leader; the popular general came from abroad and on March 24, 1794 in Cracow (Kraków) declared a national uprising under his command. Kościuszko emancipated and enrolled in his army many peasants, but the hard-fought insurrection, strongly supported also by urban plebeian masses, proved incapable of generating the necessary foreign collaboration and aid. It ended suppressed by the forces of Russia and Prussia, with Warsaw captured in November. The third and final partition of the Commonwealth was undertaken again by all three partitioning powers, and in 1795 the Polish–Lithuanian Commonwealth effectively ceased to exist.

== Economic transformations and beginnings of capitalist development ==
=== Revitalized economy, serfdom, agricultural rent and hired labor ===
Commencing primarily in the second half of the 18th century, the Polish–Lithuanian Commonwealth experienced economic transformations, which culminated in the formation of a capitalist system a century later. The more advanced West European countries were a source of examples of economic progress and formulated the ideology of Enlightenment, which provided theoretical foundations for the Polish undertakings. Industrial development, population growth and frequent warfare in the West increased the demand for agricultural products, which resulted in improved, for the agriculture-dominated Commonwealth, market situation: from the 1760s prices kept growing for farm and forest products imported from the East. The Commonwealth's grain exports reached again the high levels of the early 17th century. The internal market for produce was making gradual progress as well, because of increasing population of towns and because of urban people abandoning the agricultural labor market, which many of them had joined in times of high economic stress. Agricultural producers were able again to invest in their trade.

Despite these favorable conditions, the degree of the economic change and whether it had reached a turning point is a matter of dispute. The Commonwealth started from a very low level of economic activity early in the 18th century and its rate of growth remained less than half of that of highly developed countries, such as Great Britain or France. The relative economic backwardness had therefore remained and was one of the underlying reasons for the political and military weakness of the state.

Because of conservative resistance to changes, despite a multitude of self-help books available, agricultural economy and agrarian social relations were changing slowly. Potato cultivation was becoming more common first in Silesia and Pomerania. More typically agricultural improvements were being introduced in the western provinces of the Commonwealth, Greater Poland and Pomerelia (Gdańsk Pomerania), but overall grain yields had not yet reached the productivity of the Renaissance economy.

Enlightenment political and economic publicists had become preoccupied with promoting fundamental alteration of social aspects of agricultural production, in particular with serfdom and the necessity of its reform. Insufficient productivity and quality of output of folwark enterprises was increasingly forcing their szlachta operators to supplant or supplement the overburdened serf labor with agricultural hired work force and rent of farmland.

A pool of agricultural laborers, the "loose" people, often subjected to restrictions, were in demand and enticed by published wage tariffs in times of labor shortages. Feudal rent offered enterprising peasants more independence and ability to get ahead, if fees were reasonable. Such alternative arrangements were practiced in a minority of landed estates, most often in the western provinces of the Commonwealth. Oppressive serfdom had remained the dominant form of agricultural production throughout the vast ranges of Poland and Lithuania.

=== Manufacturing industry and trade ===
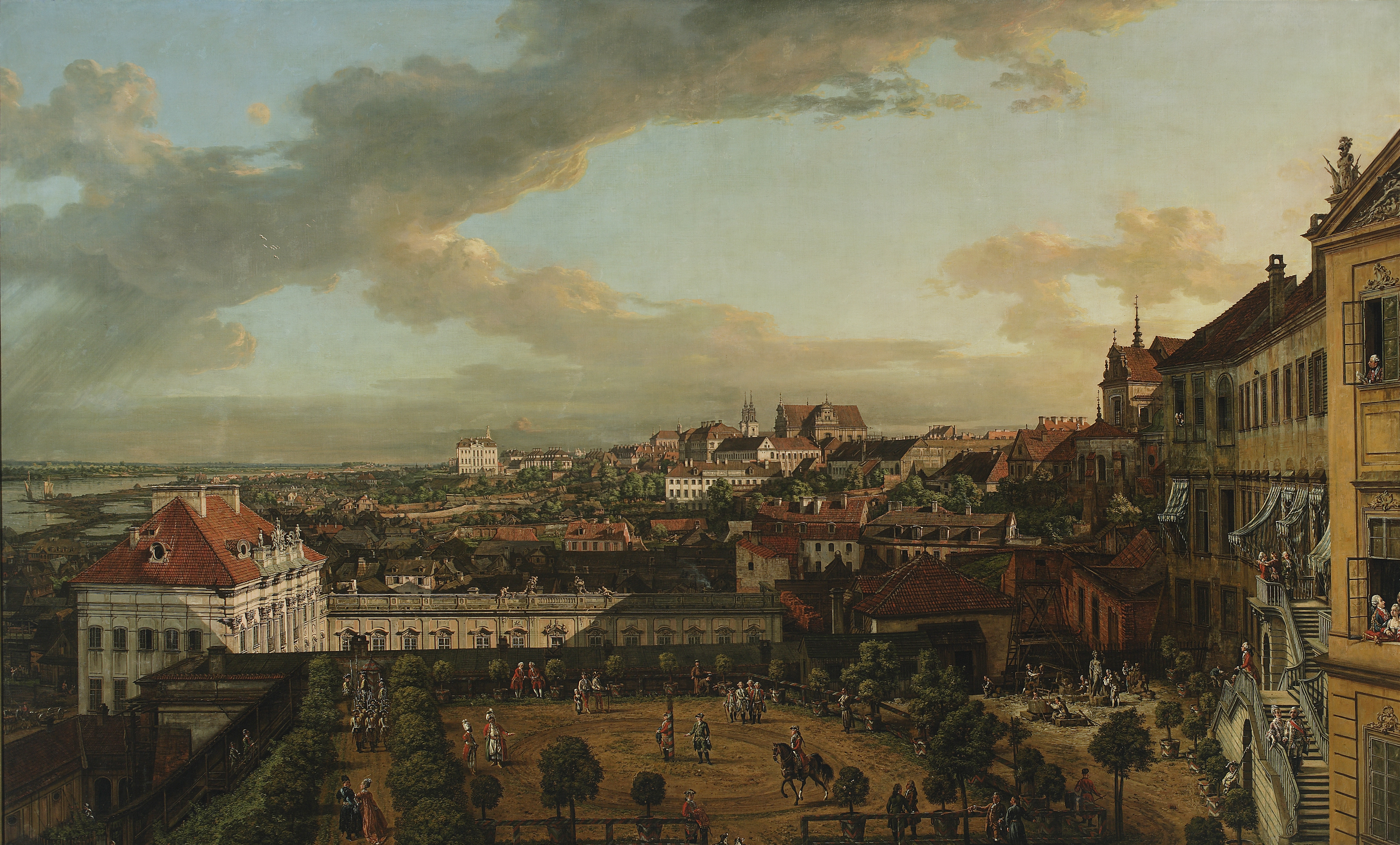
Warsaw painted by Bernardo Bellotto; view from the Royal Castle in 1773

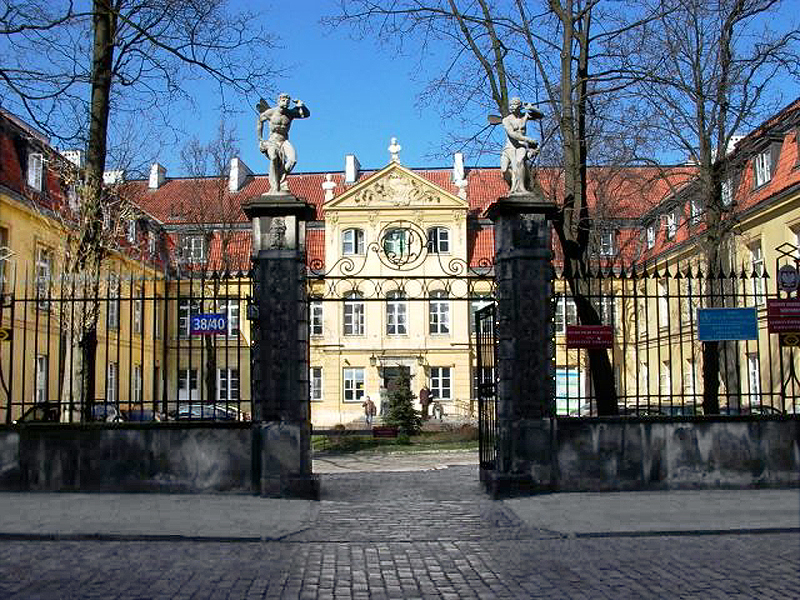
Piotr Tepper's palace in Warsaw

The level of economic prosperity in the Commonwealth was largely determined by its agricultural production, but for the fundamental transformation that the country experienced in the second half of the 18th century, the changes taking place in the cities and within the industrial sphere were of crucial importance. At the outset manufacturing and crafts were underdeveloped in comparison with Prussia, Austria and Russia. The hurried efforts to close the half-century delay and industrialization gap that took place especially during the last three decades of the Commonwealth's existence, were only partially successful.

The industrialization process, initiated by landed magnates in the first half of the 18th century, intensified during its second half, when burgher entrepreneurship also became a significant component. Important for the development of manufacturing, mining and industrial financing was the leadership of King Stanisław August Poniatowski, from the early years of his reign. Production workshops were most highly developed in the cities of Greater Poland, in Danzig and Pomerelia, Warsaw, Cracow area and some magnate estates in the east. Of the heavy industries, iron production and processing had become most significant, especially in the Old-Polish Industrial Region. The second half of the 18th century brought also heavy industry (metallurgy and mining) to the border region of Upper Silesia.

The stronger position of urban entrepreneurs was also a result of the revitalized trade. Under the King's leadership, steps were taken that led to the abolishment of nobility's monopoly on various trade activities, which made capital concentration in the hands of burgher merchants feasible. The Commonwealth was, however, being subjected to discriminatory trade practices (such as high custom duties, tariffs and fees) imposed by Prussia, Austria and Russia, the Commonwealth's stronger neighbors. Paved roads and inland waterways were constructed or improved by state authorities to facilitate the increased trade. Burgher dominated investment financing and general lending, previously concentrated in Danzig, was now done mainly in Warsaw and also in Poznań. The huge fortune accumulated by the banker Piotr Tepper, who came from a non-noble family, was an indication of changing times.

The Commonwealth's balance of trade was negative until the 1780s. The decreased role of Danzig was in part due to the Prussian harassment of the city. Prussian policies also weakened the previously vital exchanges between Silesia and the Commonwealth. Warsaw, the new great commercial center, was crucial for the considerably intensified internal trade. There were also regional trade centers such as Cracow, which served western Lesser Poland and eastern Upper Silesia. The First Partition lessened trade contacts with southern Lesser Poland and Pomerania, incorporated into Austria and Prussia.

== Social evolution and early formation of a modern nation ==
=== Changing population patterns during the partitions period; peasantry ===
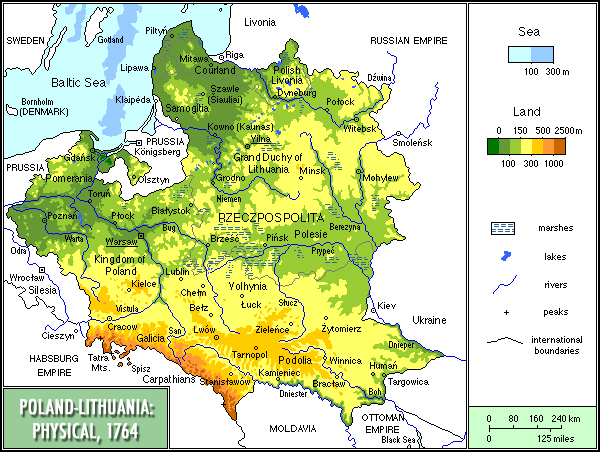
The Polish–Lithuanian Commonwealth as inherited by Stanisław August Poniatowski in 1764. The borders had been mostly stable since the Truce of Andrusovo of 1667. The country was partitioned out of existence during Poniatowski's reign (in 1772, 1793, and 1795).

Early social transformations of the multinational, nobility-dominated Commonwealth population were taking place during the period of the three partitions. To varying degrees they affected all the main strata of the society: peasants, burghers and nobility. The ethnic composition of the Commonwealth was changing with the reduced territory.

The population, estimated at no more than seven million at the end of the Great Northern War, acquired a few additional millions by the time of the First Partition. Western Poland (Kraków and Poznań regions) was much more densely populated than the vast areas in the east. After the Second Partition, the much reduced territory (from 730,000;km^{2} in 1772 to 200,000;km^{2} in 1793) contained only 4 million inhabitants. Peasants constituted three-fourths of the pre-partitions population, the growing urban strata 17-20%, and the nobility with clergy 8-10%. The population before the First Partition was two-thirds ethnically Polish or Polonized, with the minorities distributed primarily among the non-noble classes.

There were compact concentrations of ethnically Polish settlement west and north of the pre-1772 Commonwealth borders: most of Upper Silesia, parts of Lower Silesia up to Breslau region, Pomerania up to Słupsk and Miastko at the western edge, and parts of southern East Prussia. Numerous in the western and northern Commonwealth Germans constituted a minority there, except for Żuławy and northern Warmia, where they predominated. The Jews, who in many respects constituted a separate estate, were scattered throughout the country and may have had totaled 750,000, of which two-thirds lived in the cities, where their merchants and tradesmen were economically very active. The first partition reduced the proportion of ethnically Polish population to just over 50% of the Commonwealth's total; half of all Poles now lived in Prussia and Austria. Prussian and Austrian authorities introduced Germanization policies in ethnically contested areas before and during the Partitions, which supported settler colonization and restrictions on the use of the Polish language, beginning with Frederick II, Maria Theresa and Joseph II.

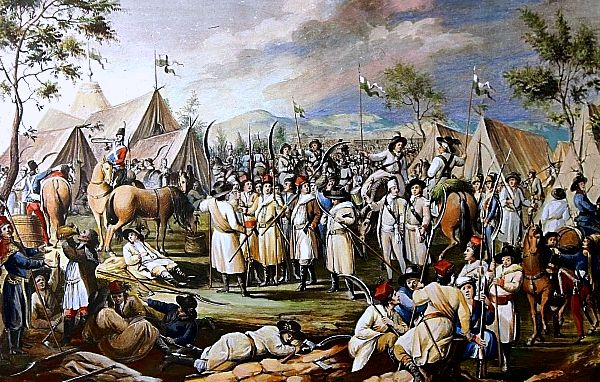
Kościuszko's peasant warriors in 1794, by Michał Stachowicz

The state of the peasantry and the issue of improving their lot became one of the leading interests and preoccupations of reformist publicists, chief among them the King. The sejm of 1768 barred feudal lords from imposing the death penalty on their serf subjects, but an attempt to regulate peasants' rights further in the 1780 Zamoyski Code was unsuccessful. Only in 1791 the May 3 Constitution generally took the peasantry under the protection of the law. A more decisive, but short-lived effort to advance the rights of the peasants was the Proclamation of Połaniec promulgated by Tadeusz Kościuszko in 1794, before the demise of the Polish-Lithuanian state. After the first partitions peasants enjoyed limited legal rights under the Prussian jurisdiction, but more meaningful protection and implemented reforms in Austria.

In the Commonwealth, ca. 64% of the peasants lived and worked within the estates of private feudal lords, where conditions differed considerably. The 19% in the royal domains and 17% on Church lands had experienced more systematic improvements in several aspects of their situation. The second half of the 18th century brought more intense stratification of the peasant class, from an increase in the numbers of the extremely pauperized element, to the evolving establishment of affluent peasant groups. The educational level of the rural serf population was improving very slowly, despite the efforts of the Commission of National Education. In times of the existential threat, the idea of national self-defense was met with some peasant response already during the Confederation of Bar, and to a much greater extent at the time of the Kościuszko Uprising.

=== Burghers and nobles ===
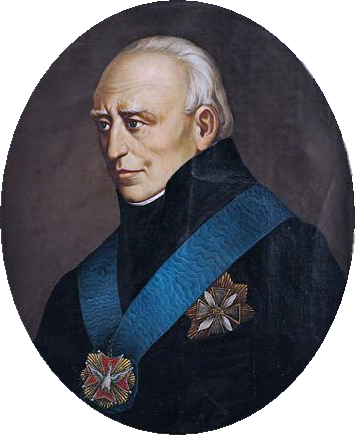
Stanisław Staszic

As in many other European countries, the Enlightenment in the Polish-Lithuanian state was a period of great advancement of the burgher class, the upper ranks of which consisted of urban business and professional people, whose economic position was growing stronger and who sought corresponding expansion of political standing and influence. In the middle of the 18th century, the towns and their inhabitants were still in miserable shape, especially in Lithuania. In Poznań Voivodeship (western Poland) urban people constituted ca. 30% of the population, in the eastern provinces below 10%. Danzig, the largest city, fell below 50,000 residents, Warsaw counted less than 30,000. Because of the state protection and revitalized economy, the situation improved during the last decades of the Commonwealth's existence, with Warsaw exceeding 100,000 around 1790; other cities grew more slowly, e.g. Cracow and Poznań reached 20,000 residents each.

During the convocation sejm of 1764, nobility-staffed commissions of good order (boni ordinis) were established. They took some measures aimed at improving urban economics, but their record was mixed and it was not until the Great Sejm era that significant reforms were implemented. From 1775 nobles were no longer barred from practicing the "urban professions". In 1791 burghers of royal cities were given the right to purchase rural property, granted court privileges and access to state offices and the sejm, while szlachta members had their prohibition from holding offices in town governments removed. The urban self-governing institutions were allowed to proceed and develop without interference and were placed under legal protection. The burgher estate had now found itself in a situation favorable in comparison with that of their brethren in Silesia, or in the strictly government-controlled areas appropriated by Prussia after the First Partition, which were also subjected to German colonizing activity at the expense of Polish urban people. The Austrian partition towns experienced lack of significant economic progress.

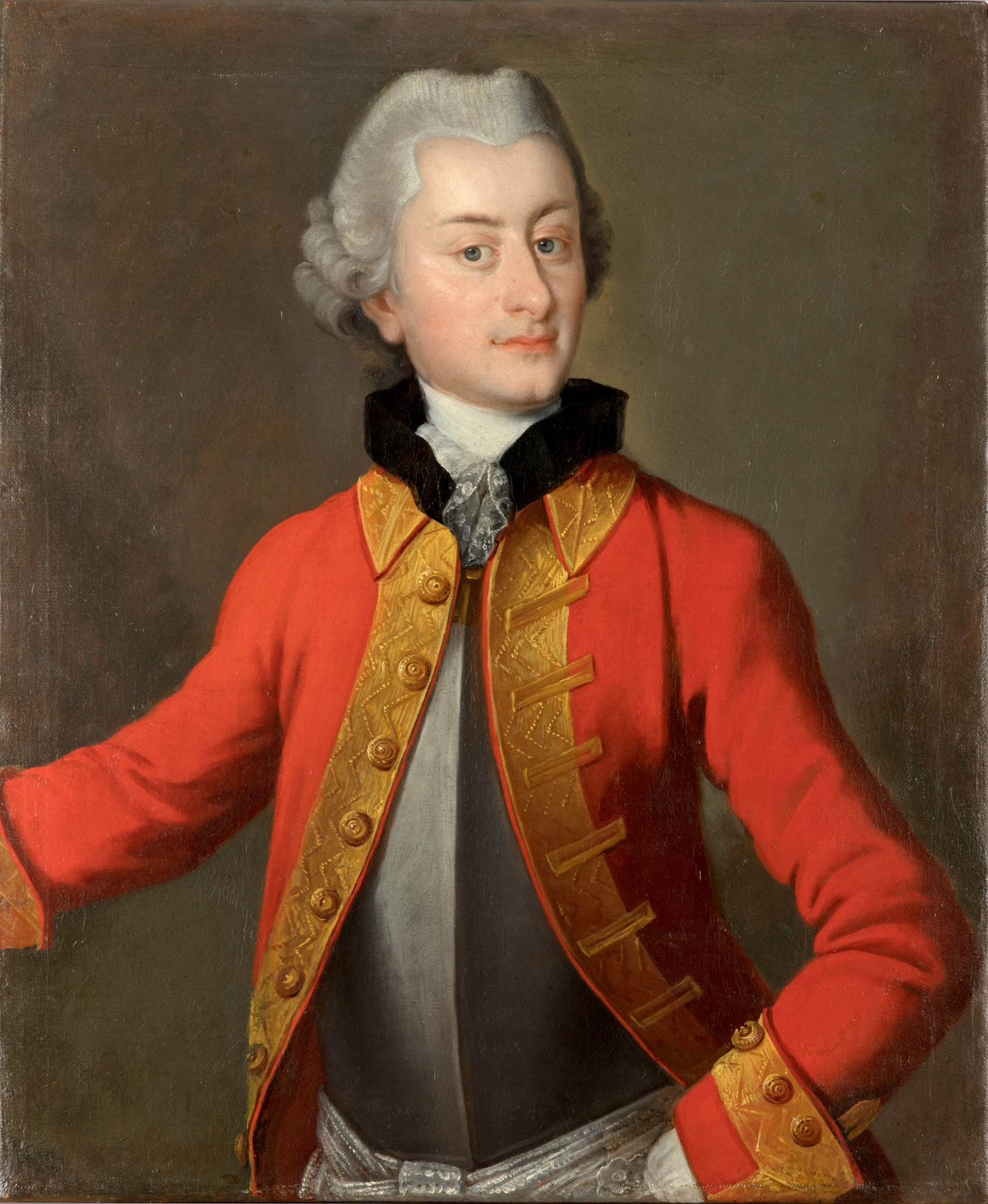
Seweryn Rzewuski was a consistent opponent of reforms. He participated in the Radom and Targowica confederations.

The early capitalist development brought new elements of social stratification in the cities, including the emergent during the last decade of independence intelligentsia, the banker, manufacturing and trade elites, and the fast-growing plebeian propertyless groups, the nascent proletariat. The laws and reforms of 1764, 1791 and 1793 granted privileges primarily to the propertied and literate urban establishments.

The economically and politically advancing burger class was becoming increasingly important in the cultural life of the Commonwealth, beginning with the German culture-inspired intellectual activity at Danzig and Thorn around the middle of the 18th century, and culminating with wealthy Warsaw townspeople of the final years of the Republic, who built urban palaces and patronized cultural endeavors. The scientist and writer Stanisław Staszic, a leading figure in the Polish Enlightenment, was the most prominent of the non-noble intellectuals of the period. The urban intelligentsia, crucial in the dissemination of the Enlightenment ideology, originated both from impoverished szlachta and from urban families; some of the strongest supporters of the national reform movement and leaders of the Kościuszko Uprising's left wing originated from that group. Many burgher sons attended leading educational institutions in the Commonwealth and abroad. Radical ideas and currents were readily assimilated by the politically very active elements of Warsaw's lower classes. Members of this group massively supported reformist postulates of the Great Sejm, promoted the French Revolution ideals, helped distribute political literature, and were the faction that matured and became indispensable during the Insurrection.

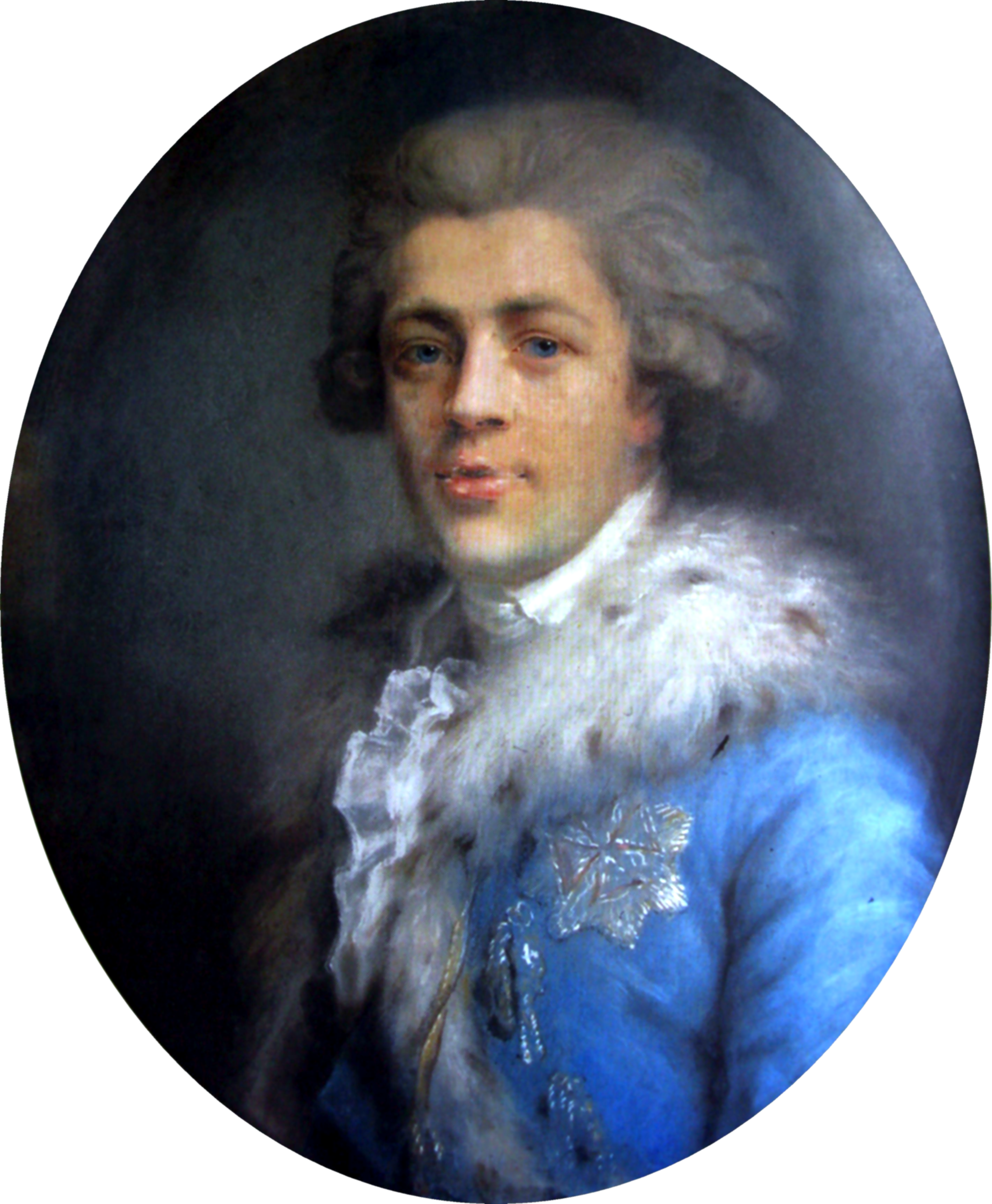
Ignacy Potocki

The majority of the nobility (szlachta) wanted to preserve its privileged position, opposed reforms during the early years of King Stanisław August and opposed the Zamoyski Code (proposed in 1776, rejected in 1780). In their final act of obstruction many nobles joined the anti-reform Targowica Confederation in 1792. The leading magnate class, rich, cosmopolitan and educated, became worlds apart from the regular gentry. Their estates in many cases became divided by the partitions and many magnates willingly served foreign interests, although there was a reformist minority that included political activists such as Andrzej Zamoyski and Ignacy Potocki. The middle nobility was more negatively (politically and economically) affected by the First Partition in areas under Prussian and Austrian control and suffered heavy losses during and after the Bar Confederation revolt and uprising. A great majority of older gentry and of those in the more distant regions of the country followed the traditional sarmatism ways and style, while many of the younger and in closer contact with the Warsaw court circles were increasingly inspired by foreign patterns, especially the French fashion, and followed the often utopian Enlightenment trends.

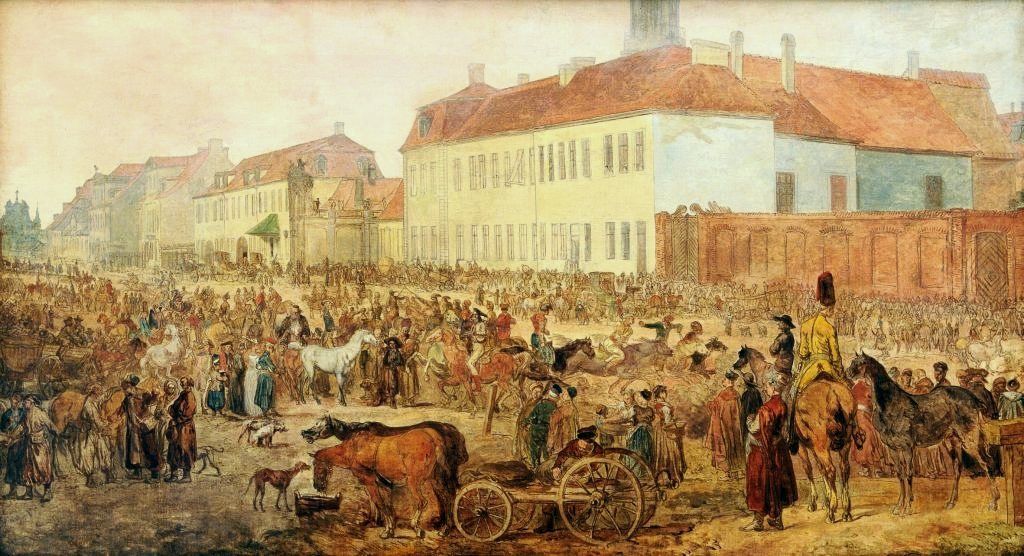
Horse market in Królewska Street in Warsaw, by Jean-Pierre Norblin de La Gourdaine

After the First Partition, out of the total of 700,000 nobles in the Commonwealth, a majority (400,000) belonged to the diverse petty nobility stratum. Members of this group possessed little or no property and were rapidly becoming degraded, because under the changing political and social circumstances the work they had traditionally provided for the wealthy (service in private magnate armies, staffing local legislative assemblies, servant duties in manorial estates etc.) were no longer in high demand. The petty gentry clung to nominal szlachta privileges for as long as possible, but they were losing their status and were often forced to become hired laborers or to move to cities. The Great Sejm in 1791 conditioned participation in local assemblies (sejmiks) on rural property minimum yearly income.

In some measure the society was becoming more egalitarian, as new statutes made it easier for upper class burgers to gain the nobility status. From now on the social status would partially, but increasingly, depend on wealth. In the second half of the 18th century, the growing Freemasonry movement, which included most prominent personalities of the era and was not limited to nobles, was an important factor in promoting egalitarian ways of thinking. A modern concept of a nation, as a community of all social classes, was beginning to take hold even among szlachta ideologists.

== Intellectual breakthrough and flowering of the arts ==
=== Commission of National Education, educational renewal and progress in science ===
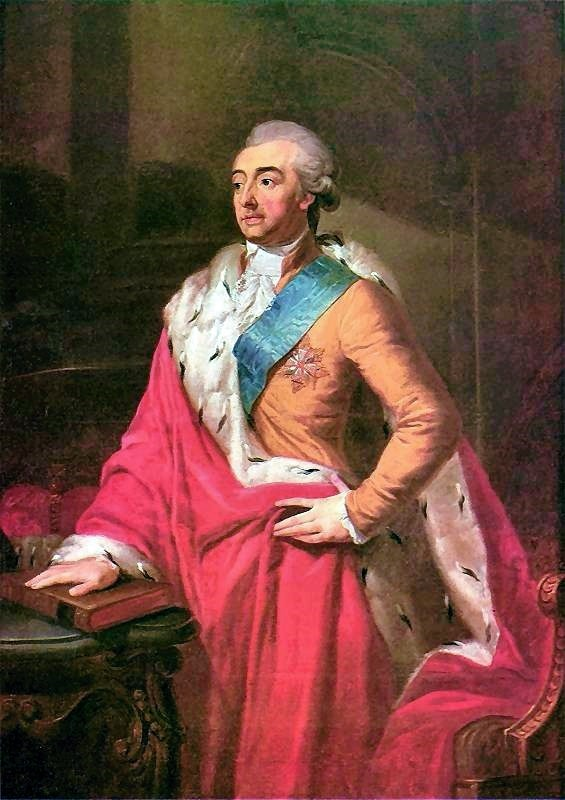
Adam Kazimierz Czartoryski

The fundamental educational reform, aimed at broad segments of society, aspired to produce citizens that were enlightened and engaged in public matters, as well as prepared in practical subjects. It contributed greatly to both the changes in general mentality and intellectual achievement of the Polish Enlightenment, with the Commonwealth becoming one of the more active centers of the European culture again. With the existence of the Polish statehood increasingly threatened, education was seen as the way to alter the prevailing mentality of the ruling szlachta class, by imparting a sense of civic duties and enabling them to undertake the necessary reforms.

The first significant reforms of the Jesuit and Piarist schools had already been taking place since the 1740s. Before the First Partition, there were about 104 church-run colleges, ten academic and the rest at the secondary level; nationwide 30 to 35 thousand students attended classes. But the position of the Church was getting weaker, as some segments of society were becoming influenced by the French Enlightenment ideology. The situation was ripe for a state takeover and laicization of schooling, which reflected the prevailing at that time European trends.

The first lay school in Poland, the "School of Knighthood" or the Nobles' Academy of the Corps of Cadets, was established in 1765, soon after Stanisław August's ascent to power. It served primarily the educational needs of the military, was led by the enlightened magnate Adam Kazimierz Czartoryski, and produced a number of future military leaders, including Tadeusz Kościuszko.

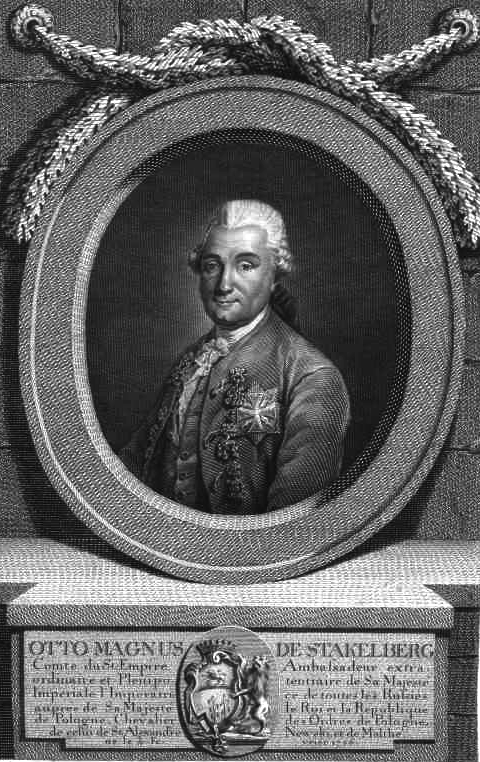
Russian ambassador Otto Magnus von Stackelberg, an informal ruler of Poland referred to as the Russian proconsul in the Commonwealth, agreed to the establishment of the Commission of National Education

The general and fundamental educational reform became possible after the Suppression of the Jesuits, who at that time operated a majority of colleges. In 1773 the sejm established, in order to conduct the reform, the Commission of National Education; the Commission was authorized to take over the Jesuit schools, possessions and funds. Among the Commission's members were Andrzej Zamoyski, Ignacy Potocki, bishops Michał Poniatowski and Ignacy Massalski; among its collaborators were educators, including Grzegorz Piramowicz and Hugo Kołłątaj. The Education Commission reformed all aspects and levels of education, from elementary to higher, and it imposed new laicized teaching programs.

Secondary education was supervised by the two major universities, or "main schools", the Academy of Kraków (Cracow) and the Academy of Wilno (Vilnius), both of which were at that time in process of undergoing comprehensive reforms. In Cracow the reform was directed by Kołłątaj, who expanded several departments, especially in the fields of mathematics and the physical sciences, stressed practical applications of academic subjects and introduced the Polish language as the main teaching medium. The "Main School of the Crown" had become, after a long break, a creative scientific center. Effective reforms in Vilnius were accomplished by the outstanding mathematician, Marcin Poczobutt-Odlanicki. The subordinate formerly Jesuit secondary schools were still staffed mainly by teachers from the dissolved order, who generally cooperated with the new lay rules.

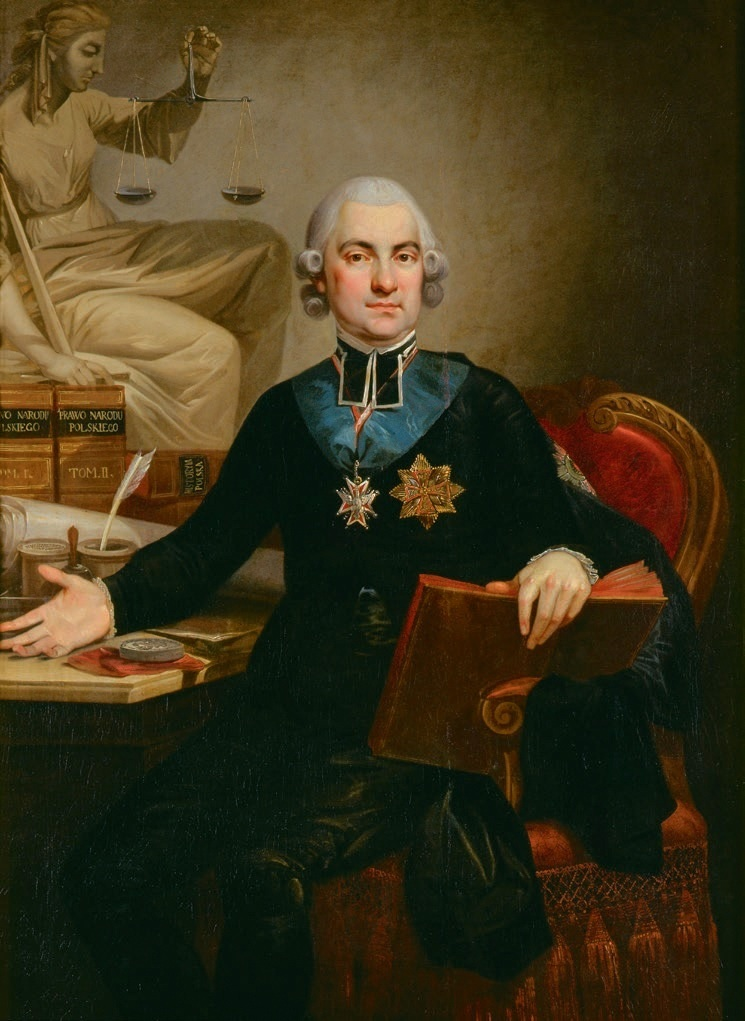
Hugo Kołłątaj

Many other schools were directly under the guidance of the Education Commission, whose approved teaching programs emphasized the exact sciences and the national language, history and geography; Latin became restricted and theology was eliminated. "Moral science", aimed at producing responsible citizens, was no longer Catholic religion-based. There were also numerous parish schools, which were not a part of the Commission's official domain, but remained substantially influenced by its work. The Society for Elementary Books, established in 1775, produced 27 modern, mainly secondary education textbooks.

Among the peasant population, the educational progress was still meager. There were ca. 1600 parish schools in 1772, which constituted no more than half of their former number at around the turn of the 16th and 17th centuries. More rural schools were established during the Great Sejm era and more girls were enrolled at that time.

The activities of the Commission of National Education resulted in the greatest cultural achievement of the Polish Enlightenment. The educational reforms were vigorously criticized by the conservatives, but the new policies had been successfully defended and remained in force for the duration of the Commonwealth's existence. The Polish-Lithuanian state found itself among the leading European countries regarding the educational organization and quality at the academic and secondary levels; the Commission deeply influenced the prevailing social attitudes of not only its own time, but also well into the 19th century.

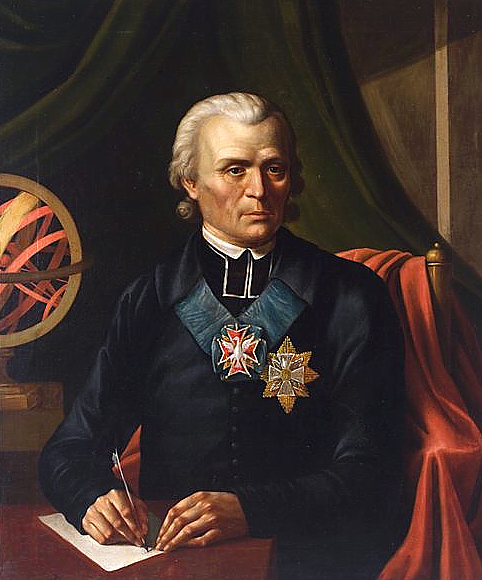
Marcin Poczobutt-Odlanicki

There was progress in the area of education in the lands appropriated by Prussia and Austria after the First Partition too. General education was becoming more universally available for the non-noble classes (required of all in Prussia), but the knowledge of German was necessary for the attainment of more than the most basic educational level.

Rationalism and empiricism based science was breaking its dependence on religion, seeking deeper understanding of nature and society. The aim was to scientifically rebuild the society and facilitate exploitation of natural resources through knowledge, which gave strong emphasis also to applied branches of scientific disciplines. Modern scientific notions had been actively developed in Western Europe since the second half of the 17th century, when the Commonwealth was entering its period of backwardness; the current state of knowledge therefore had to be assimilated in the Commonwealth and utilized for local needs in the second half of the 18th century.

State of the art research in astronomy was conducted by Marcin Poczobutt in Vilnius and Jan Śniadecki in Cracow. The mathematicians included the above two researchers and Michał Hube of Thorn. Jan Jaśkiewicz and Józef Osiński were chemists interested also in technical and industrial applications.

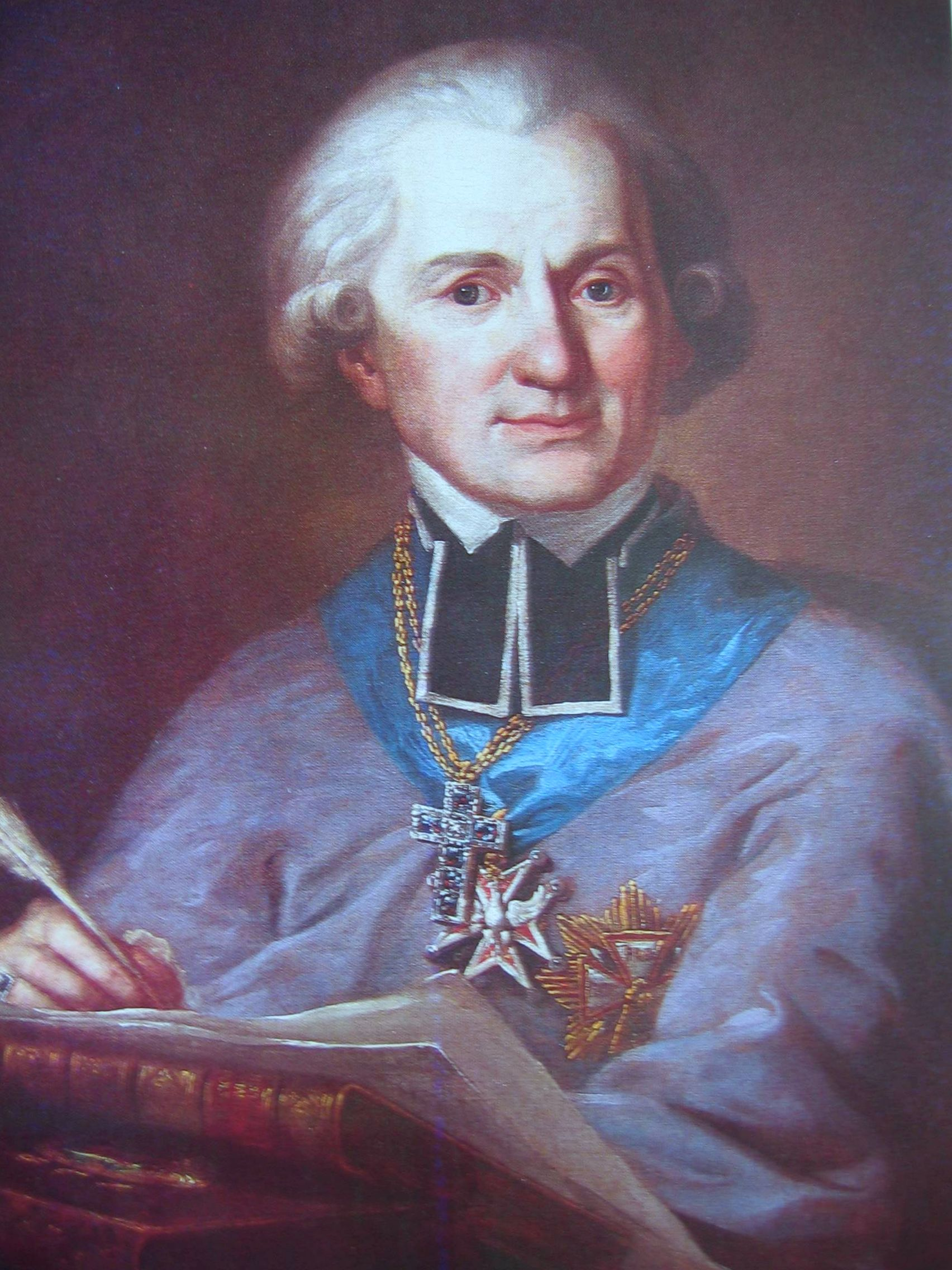
Historian Adam Naruszewicz

Outstanding among the naturalists was Jan Krzysztof Kluk, who researched and described the flora and fauna of Poland and applied his knowledge to agriculture. Cartography and the compilation of maps of the Commonwealth was a major project with military applications and was directed by the King. Karol de Perthées completed only maps of the western part of the country. Jan Potocki traveled widely and left outstanding written accounts of his adventures. Medical knowledge developed mainly at the two universities, where its organizational structures underwent modernization and reform; the major figures were Andrzej Badurski and Rafał Czerniakowski in Cracow.

Antoni Popławski and Hieronim Stroynowski were economists and adherents of physiocracy. The leading intellectual personalities of the period, Hugo Kołłątaj and Stanisław Staszic, subscribed to physiocratic views as well, but also favored state protectionism according to the rules of mercantilism and cameralism. The state was supposed to protect the peasant as the creator of agricultural wealth and help in the development of industry and trade.

Modern history and historiography developed through the work of Feliks Łojko-Rędziejowski, who pioneered the use of statistics, and especially Bishop Adam Naruszewicz. Naruszewicz completed his History of the Polish Nation only to 1386, but also left a collection of highly valuable for historical research source materials and dealt critically with the more recent destructive tendencies in szlachta's politics.

The Enlightenment contribution of Polish science was more modest than that of the Renaissance era, but the common efforts to broaden and popularize the appeal of science and knowledge signified their new social role. There were many textbooks, translations, popular outlines and periodicals, The Historical-Political Diary of Piotr Świtkowski of Warsaw being a prominent example of the last category.

=== Literature and the arts of the Enlightenment, Rococo and Classicism ===
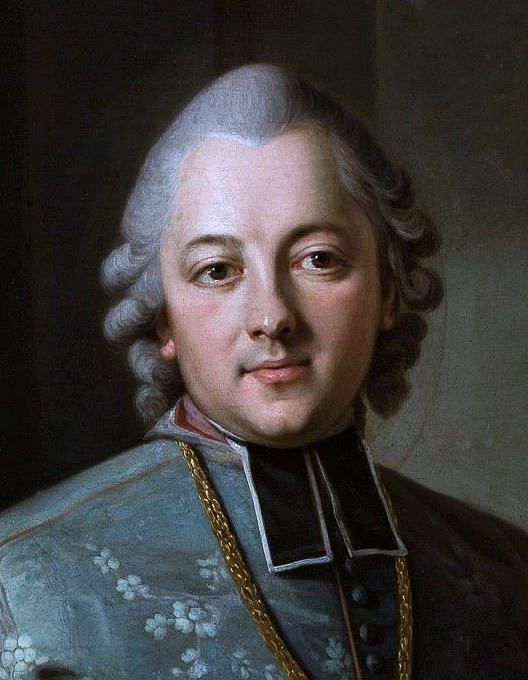
Ignacy Krasicki

The Polish literature of the Enlightenment had a primarily didactic character. The works of its main current were classicistic in form and rationalistic in social outlook. There were many sharp polemical exchanges, for which the satire form was frequently utilized. This genre was practiced by Franciszek Bohomolec and Adam Naruszewicz, and in its most highly developed form by Bishop Ignacy Krasicki. Krasicki, dubbed the "Prince of the Poets", wrote also the early Polish novels The Adventures of Nicholas the Experienced and Lord Steward, both instructive in nature. He was a major literary figure of the period and a member of the inner circle of the royal court of Stanisław August Poniatowski. Krasicki's satires Monachomachia and Antymonachomachia ridiculed the mentality and attitudes of Catholic monks. Another poet from the King's circle was Stanisław Trembecki, noted also for his panegyrics.

Bohomolec was a longtime editor of the periodical Monitor, which criticized the social and political relations existing in the Commonwealth and promoted citizenship values and virtues. Because of the dominance of the noble class in Polish society and its culture, it became apparent to the reformers that a literary model citizen they were creating, first just by trying to import the West European patterns, under the Polish conditions had to assume the form of an "enlightened Sarmatian". The idea of a modern, progressive nobleman was explored by Krasicki in his works and had reached its full fruition in the era of the Great Sejm.

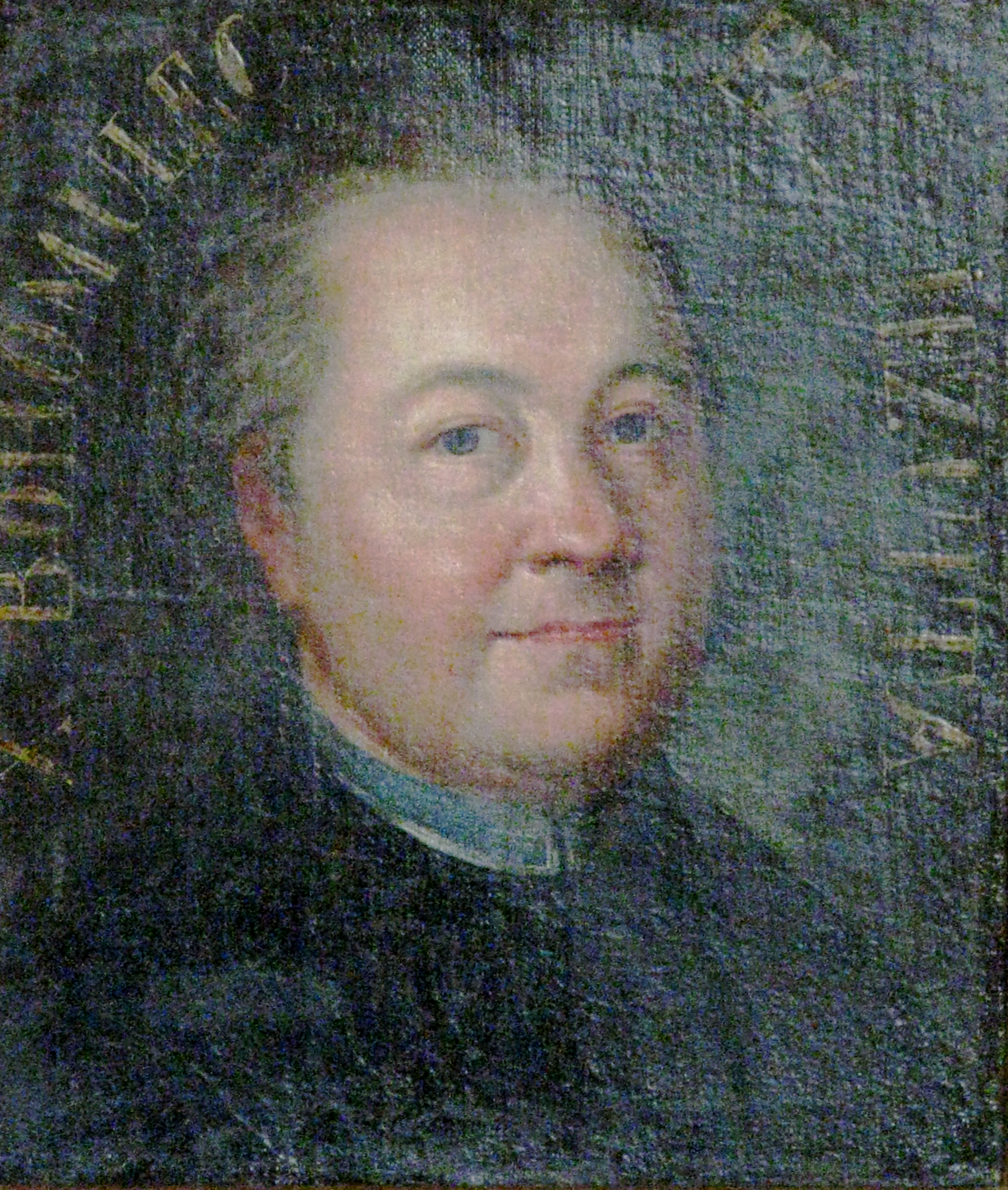
Franciszek Bohomolec

Much of the intellectual life was centered around the royal court. The leading writers, artists and scientists participated in the Thursday Dinners at the Royal Castle in Warsaw. The Dinners were the forum provided by the King, a generous sponsor of the activities of the intellectual elite, for discussing their interests, including the current important matters of the state. The acceptance of the European Enlightenment ideas in the Commonwealth owed much to the King's involvement.

Other centers of artistic and political discourse came into prominence, at the expense of the royal court and its influence, with the increasing radicalization of public sentiment. In response to the detrimental for the country events, of which foreign domination and the partitions were the most disconcerting, new outlets for creative activity were formed. Hugo Kołłątaj's Kuźnica (Kołłątaj's Forge) of the Great Sejm period was one of the groups that wished to distance themselves from the royal court party. Other writers of the newer variety were supported by wealthy burgher patronage. They had all become very influential among the enlightened nobility and the general public of Warsaw, often originated from the dispossessed or otherwise degraded szlachta, and their writings straddled the realms of literature and political opinion journalism, published in many pamphlets. Franciszek Salezy Jezierski, a prolific writer before and around 1790, was a leading and compassionate critic of the szlachta government and defender of the lower social strata. Jakub Jasiński was a poet and general during the Kościuszko Uprising, a leader in the leftist Polish Jacobins faction. The more radical political writers rejected the concept of the "noble nation" and appealed to the entire population, often stressing the importance of its lower classes, peasantry and urban plebs, also in the struggle for independence.

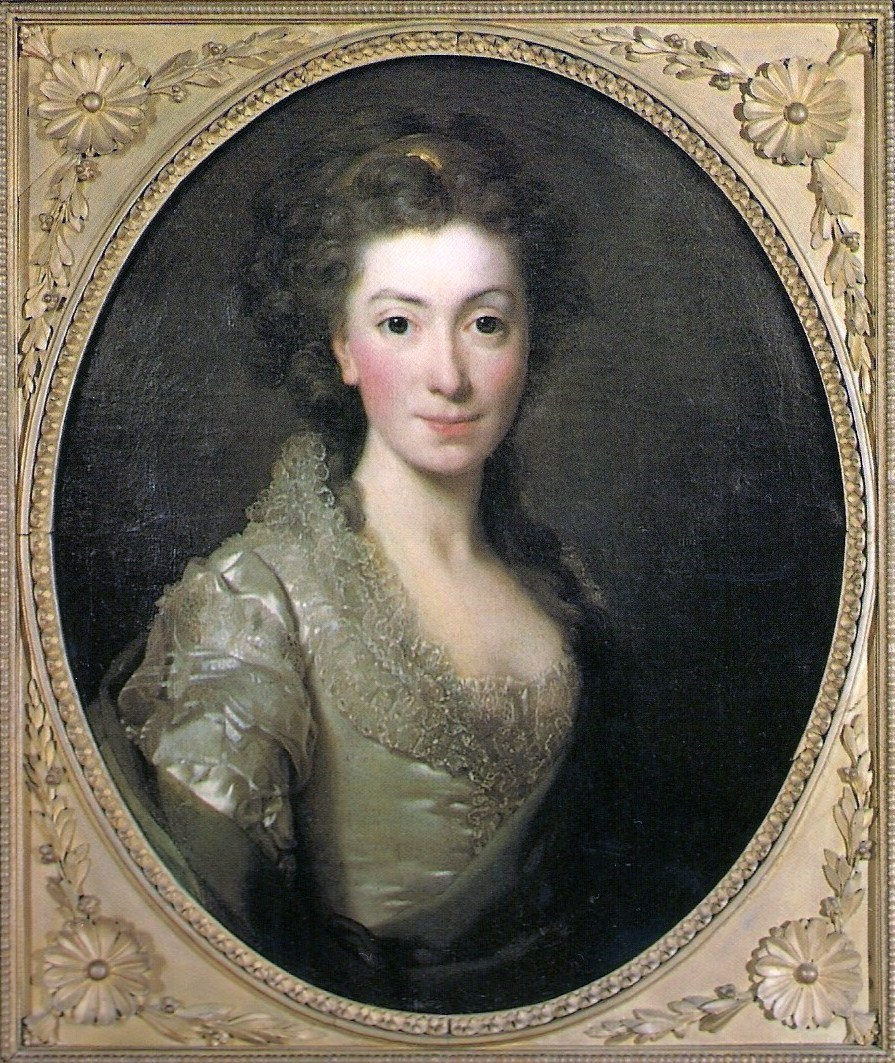
Izabela Czartoryska was an art patron. Much of her collection of art and historical memorabilia has survived and is kept at the Czartoryski Museum in Kraków.

The other, distinctly different current in literature was influenced by French Rococo and based more directly on sentimentalism, increasingly popular in Europe since the publication of the romances of Jean-Jacques Rousseau. In Poland the then fashionable folklore elements and peasant creativity works were, sometimes accurately and convincingly, utilized within the sentimentalist genres (e.g. pastorals). The most successful in this field were the lyrical poets, Franciszek Dionizy Kniaźnin and Franciszek Karpiński, who later became influential with the Romantic Era Polish writers.

The sentimentalist writers and artists were supported by the Czartoryski magnate family. Related to the King, the Czartoryskis distanced themselves from him and in the 1780s fostered at their seat in Puławy the greatest provincial center of culture. Izabela Czartoryska's English park there was intended to mimic virgin nature and intimately relate the residence to its rustic, rather than urban surroundings. The Czartoryskis rivaled the royal court in their desire to constructively influence and reform the Commonwealth's nobility (still to be controlled by the magnate class), but operating in a different setting, they chose alternate ways of social persuasion and artistic expression. They stressed the country's historic traditions and the necessity of their evolution into a modern state and society.

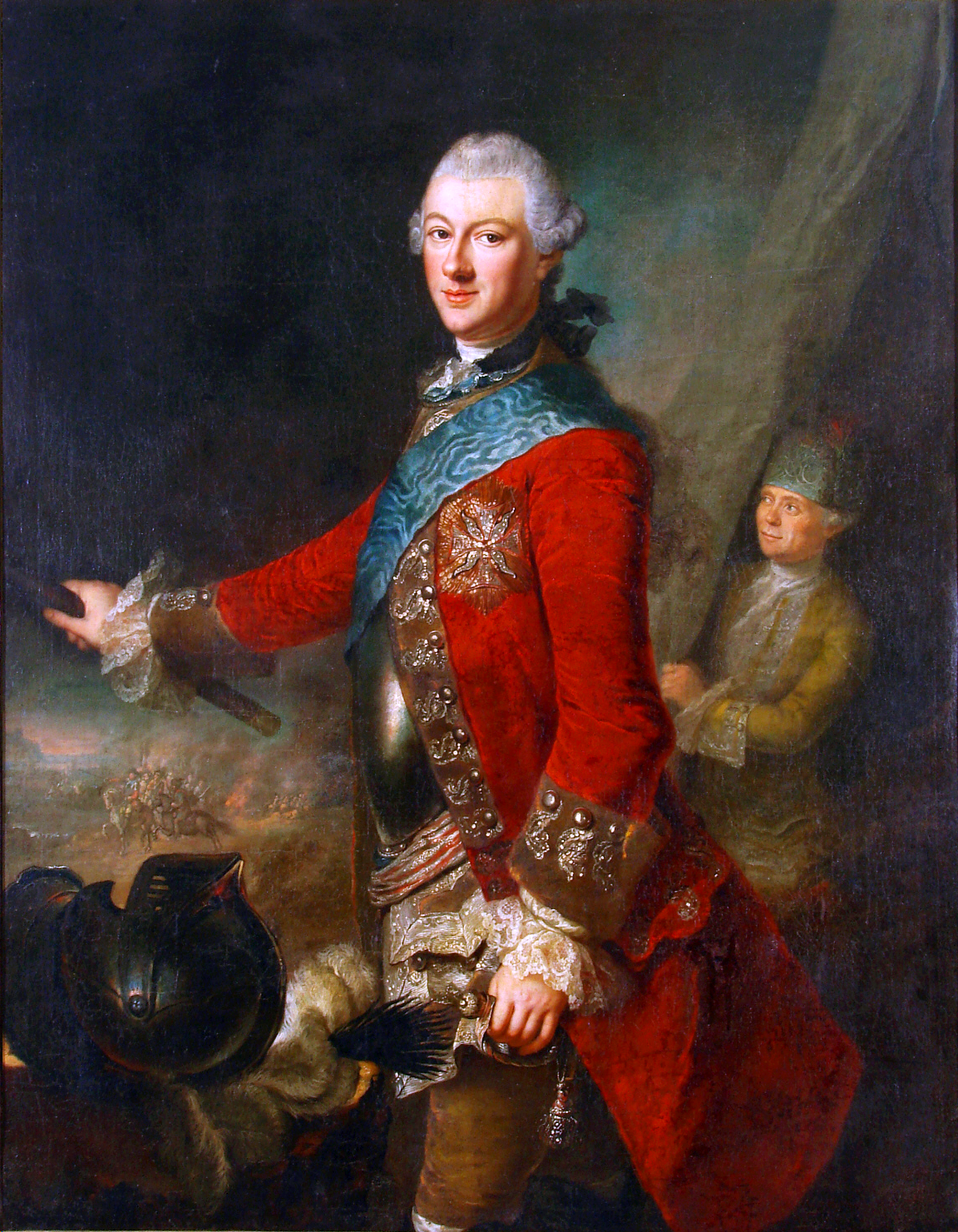
Michał Kazimierz Ogiński

The Enlightenment brought also a revival of the Polish national theater. Polish language plays were initiated at Warsaw's main theater, upon Stanisław August's efforts, from 1765 (often French plays adapted or reworked by Franciszek Bohomolec and later Franciszek Zabłocki). The first full-fledged Polish plays were the patriotic The Return of the Deputy by Julian Ursyn Niemcewicz (1790) and the folklore-inspired Krakowiacy and Górale (names of ethnographic (folk) groups of southern Lesser Poland) by the long-term theater director Wojciech Bogusławski. The latter was staged as an innovative and uplifting opera spectacle right before the outset of the Kościuszko Insurrection.

In the areas of music and visual or plastic arts there had been continuity with the preceding (Saxon monarchs) period. To add splendor to their position, the kings and the magnates kept and supported painters, sculptors, architects and musicians, who were of various nationalities, including Polish, German, French and Italian.

The court of the Ogiński magnate family was musically inclined and the Ogińskis themselves produced two noted composers, Michał Kazimierz Ogiński and Michał Kleofas Ogiński. Maciej Kamieński, a Slovak settled in Poland, wrote the first Polish opera Misery Contented, staged in Warsaw in 1778. The Czech Jan Stefani wrote the musical score for Krakowiacy and Górale. Besides the several Polish operas shown at various locations, instrumental styles of secular music were becoming more developed and popular, which had to do with the (characteristic of the times) general laicization of artistic tastes.

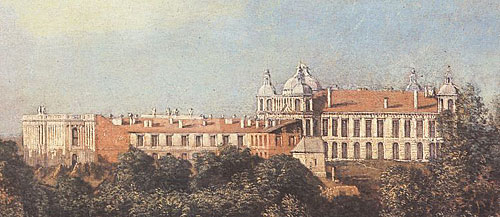
Ujazdów Castle in about 1775, painting by Bernardo Bellotto

In the flowering of architecture and painting the manner of classicism predominated, with more eclectic trends also present. Baroque and Rococo works continued in the second half of the 18th century and forms corresponding to literary sentimentalism appeared toward the end of the period.

Churches and monastic quarters were built mostly in the Baroque style until the end of the 18th century. Rococo architecture coincided with the beginning of the Polish Enlightenment. It created finely decorated, more private and intimate chambers and other spaces, subordinate structures into which larger buildings were subdivided. Rococo is represented by the Mniszech family residential complex in Dukla and the Ujazdów Castle in Warsaw, rebuilt in that style by Efraim Szreger.

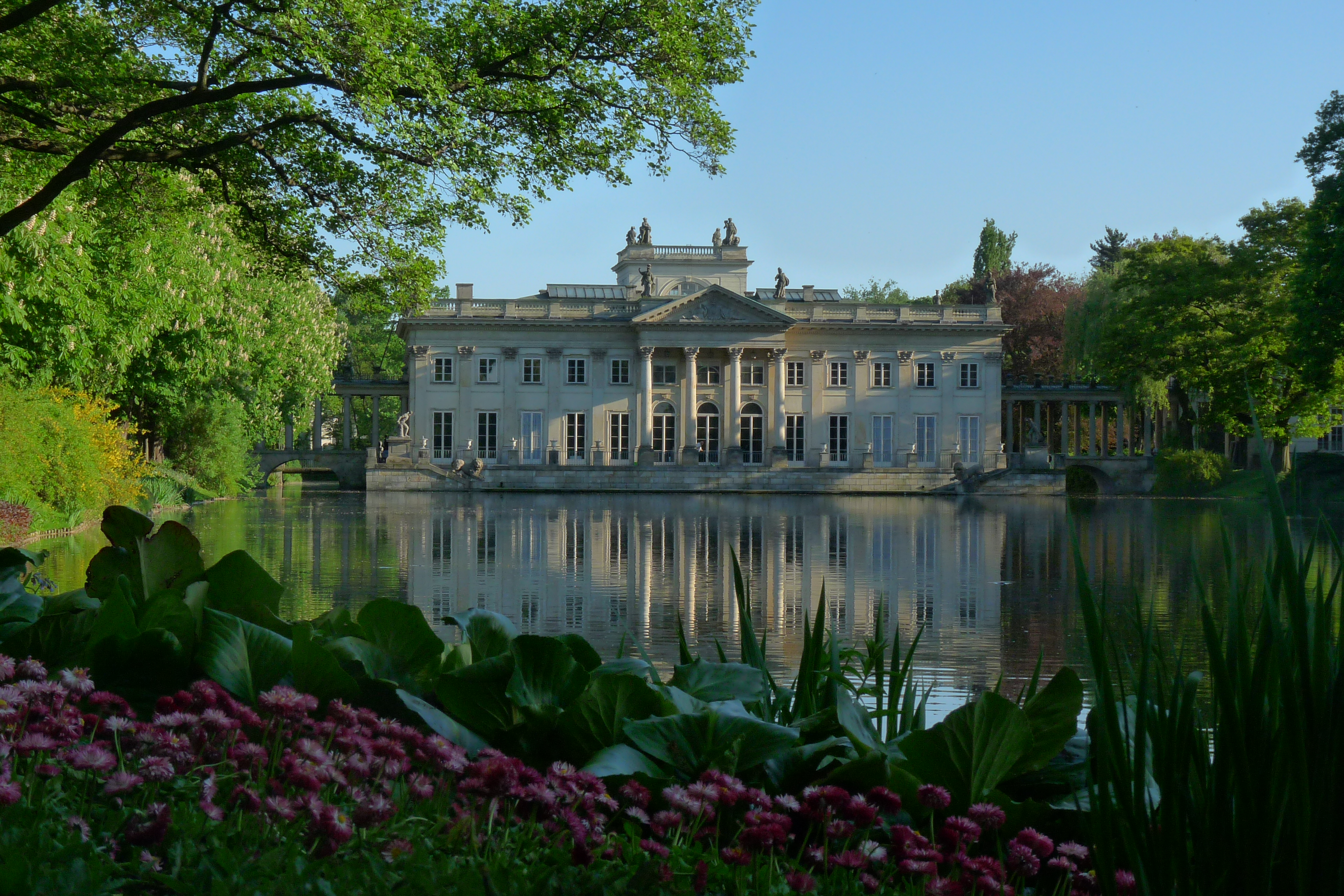
Palace on the Water at Łazienki

The French-influenced classicistic structures were symmetrical, single buildings, often with colonnades and central domes. They were initiated in the 1760s because of Stanisław August's artistic preferences. The King had the interior of the Royal Castle redone and after 1783 the summer Łazienki Palace rebuilt in the style of classicism by Domenico Merlini. Łazienki park was decorated with sculptures by André Le Brun. The Protestant Holy Trinity Church in Warsaw (architect Szymon Bogumił Zug) was patterned after the Pantheon of Rome and the classical style was imitated in many burgher residencies in cities and provincial palaces of the nobility. The most representative type of the szlachta manor house, complete with a tympanum over the entrance, was formed at that time.

The castle in Warsaw and Łazienki Palace were decorated by paintings of Marcello Bacciarelli, who also produced many portraits, including Polish historical, and spawned many talented younger native artists. Jean-Pierre Norblin, a French painter brought to Puławy by the Czartoryskis, created many current event, historical and landscape scenes of striking individuality and realism. His artistic influence became fully realized in the 19th century. Among the Polish painters, Franciszek Smuglewicz and Józef Peszka, professors at Vilnius and Cracow, were the leading figures. Tadeusz Kuntze worked mostly in Rome, and Daniel Chodowiecki in Berlin.

== First reforms, szlachta uprising, First Partition of the Polish–Lithuanian state ==
=== Familia reforms and election of Stanisław August Poniatowski; religious dissent controversy and Confederation of Radom ===
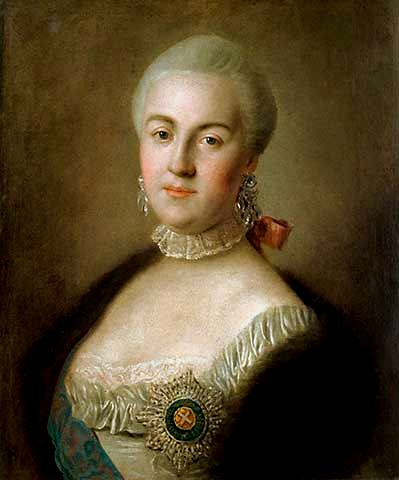
Catherine the Great, a German princess turned Russian empress, was to become one of the most powerful women in history and the final executioner of the Polish–Lithuanian Commonwealth

The final years of the reign of Augustus III accelerated the disintegration of the Polish–Lithuanian Commonwealth. Corruption and anarchy sprang from the royal court circles and engulfed also the leading Czartoryski and Potocki factions. Hetman Jan Klemens Branicki, popular with regular szlachta, was among the leading oligarchs. Russia emerged form the Seven Years' War as the main victorious power, and, aligned with Prussia, became decisively important in the affairs of the weak, subjected to foreign transgressions and incapable of independent functioning Commonwealth.

Under the circumstances, the Familia party of the Czartoryskis looked toward an alliance with imperial Russia as the most viable for the Polish-Lithuanian state option. A particular opportunity seemed to have arisen from the fact that Stanisław Poniatowski, related and connected to their faction, had enjoyed a personal relationship with the new empress Catherine II, acquired during his recent stay as an envoy in St. Petersburg. The Czartoryskis, unpopular at that time with much of szlachta, intended essentially a coup d'état with Russian troops and the removal of the corrupt rule of Jerzy August Mniszech of the Saxon court. Familia petitioners supported Catherine's political moves in Courland, but due to the Tsaritsa's misgivings, their plans came to fruition only after the death of Augustus III.

Invited by the Czartoryskis, the Russian forces entered the country and helped Familia to put the Convocation Sejm of 1764 under its control (Adam Kazimierz Czartoryski was the Marshal of the Sejm). The resistance of the "Republican" faction led by Hetman Branicki and Karol Radziwiłł was overcome and the opposition leaders had to leave the country. Andrzej Zamoyski then presented a program of constructive reforms, that included the majority rule in parliament, establishment of a permanent executive council (as recommended by Stanisław Konarski) and turning of the Republic's highest offices into collective organs. Frederick II and Prussian diplomats in cooperation with St. Petersburg and szlachta opposition were able to thwart much of the planned reform. The partial reforms pushed through with Catherine's support were still significant and constitute the beginning of the "enlightened" period, when the Polish-Lithuanian state attempted to adopt a variety of long overdue measures and thus save its existence. Parliamentary rules were made more functional, deputies were no longer bound by instructions issued by the local assemblies that delegated them (sejmiks), majority voting was imposed in matters involving the treasury and economics (which weakened the unanimity requirement enforced thus far by the liberum veto procedure). Military (hetman) and treasury highest officers were assigned respective parliamentary commissions that limited their power. The reform of matters important for the urban burgher class was also undertaken and included elimination of private customs and introduction of general customs, as well as partially limiting jurydykas.

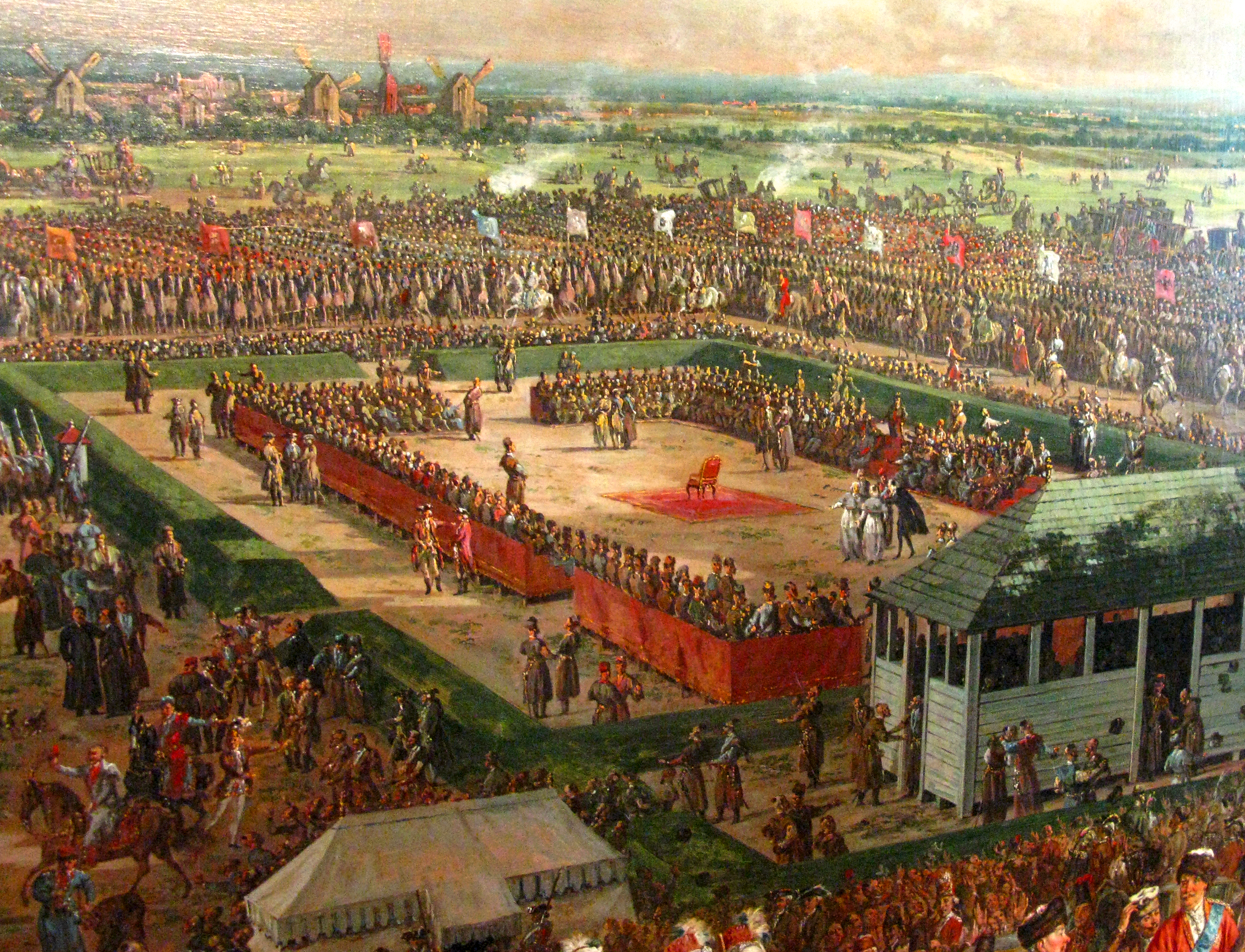
The flawed election of 1764 resulted in Stanisław August Poniatowski becoming the (last) King of Poland and Grand Duke of Lithuania

The royal election of 1764 took place in the presence of Russian troops. The szlachta electors gathered near Warsaw followed the wishes of the Empress and chose Stanisław Poniatowski, who became king as Stanisław August Poniatowski. To the Czartoryski party, the elevation of a man who was not a central or senior figure of their clan was after all something of a disappointment. This aspect affected their future relations with the King, who would also distance himself from Familia, and, lacking support of any major domestic faction or decisive personal character, develop strong dependence on his Russian sponsors. The new king was a man in his early thirties, thoroughly educated, reform-minded and familiar with political practices and relations in the Commonwealth and other European countries, as he had traveled extensively. Stanislaw August was a patron of arts and sciences; like other personalities of his era, he was particularly concerned with his own career and well-being. The King started the reign from a weak and handicapped position and later, often denied legitimacy and support from the nobility of the Commonwealth, had been unable to substantially improve his political standing. Yet Poniatowski was the person around whom the affairs of Poland-Lithuania would revolve for the federation's last three decades of existence and whose influence (and shortcomings) may have been decisive for its fate.

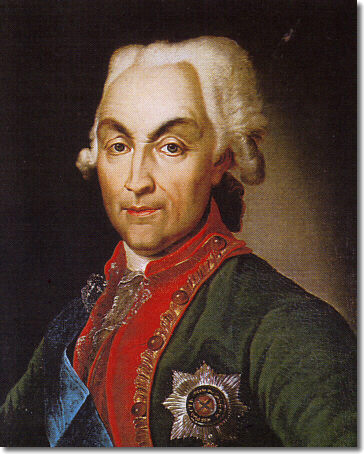
Nicholas Repnin was an all- powerful Russian envoy in Warsaw in 1764-1769

The coronation and the Coronation Sejm took place in 1764, for the first (and last) time in Warsaw. A general confederation proclaimed already before the Convocation Sejm remained in force, which was a mechanism contrived so that a sejm could function as a veto-proof, easier to control confederated sejm. Steps were taken there to strengthen the recent successes of Familia legislators, and the King acted to facilitate a more efficient government. A regular conference of the King and his ministers was set up and monetary affairs reform was taken up by a special commission. "Committees of good order" were created for royal cities, to help with local treasury and economic matters. The new chancellor, Andrzej Zamoyski, took upon himself the protection of the cities. The state treasury revenues quickly rose. The establishment of the Corps of Cadets was a modest forerunner of the intended military reform. Already in 1765, however, Frederick II forced the abandonment of general customs, inconvenient to Prussian economic infiltration, and soon Catherine II herself, alarmed by the denunciations of the Polish opposition, moved against reforms, the reform movement and the King.

The King and Familia were attacked by the Russian and Prussian interests, formally because of the situation of religious dissenters, that is non-Catholic Christians (Orthodox and Protestant), mostly non-nobility, whose political and religious rights in the Commonwealth had been considerably curtailed for a century or more, particularly in 1717 and 1733–1736. Members of the religious minorities had objected and appealed (to no avail) to Polish kings and parliaments and to their foreign supporters, who, invoking the appropriate clauses of the Treaty of Oliva of 1660 and the Eternal Peace Treaty of 1686, intervened on numerous occasions at the Polish court. Stanisław August's new reign, combined with the Enlightenment toleration postulates, appeared to have had opened new opportunities for improvements in the religious dissent situation.

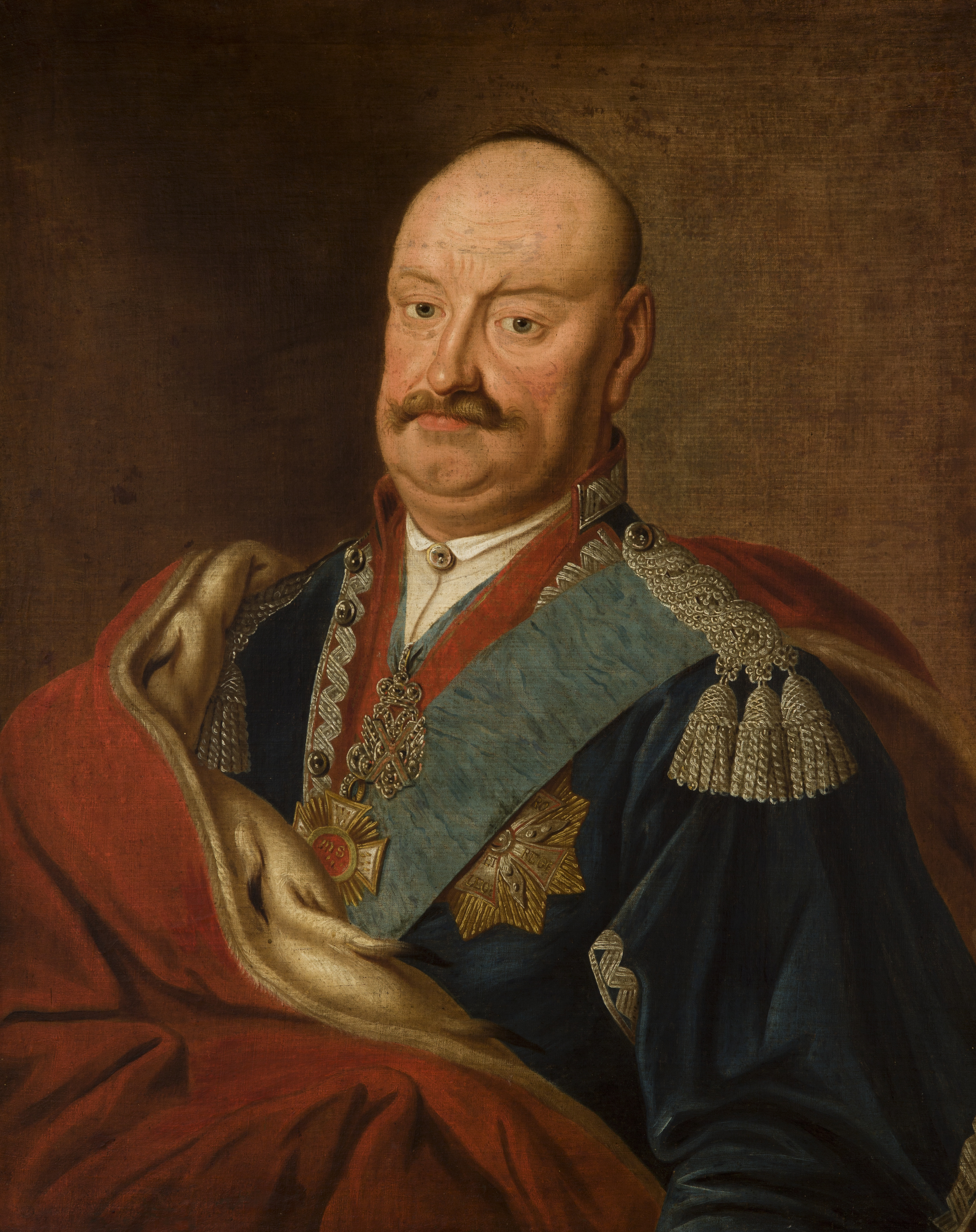
Karol Stanisław "Panie Kochanku" Radziwiłł was opposed to reforms and represented traditional szlachta values

The dissenter proposals, aimed at a return to the formerly practiced religious equality policies, were rejected at the Convocation Sejm in 1764, but upon foreign appeals made by the dissenters, had gained the support of Denmark, Russia and Prussia. The Familia party at that time rejected religious reform for the fear of antagonizing the masses of fanatically intolerant nobility and of encouraging regional political dissent in Royal Prussia and the Grand Duchy of Lithuania, when they were trying to strengthen the dysfunctional central government. Their and the King's idea was to act on the matter gradually, first through a public education campaign, such as the articles published in the Monitor.

Catherine II and Frederick II found the controversy a convenient pretext to intervene, and during the sejm of 1766, acting through their envoys Nicholas Repnin and Gédéon Benoît and taking advantage of the fierce opposition against Familia there, blocked further restrictions on liberum veto privileges. Under the protection of new Russian forces dispatched to Poland, the dissenters established confederations in Słuck and Thorn. Repnin initiated the establishment of the Radom Confederation of Catholic anti-Familia nobility, led by Karol Radziwiłł, ostensibly for the purpose of the defense of "faith and freedom". The confederates, hoping for a dethronement of Stanisław August, condemned the reforms and sent a delegation to the Empress, asking her to guarantee the traditional szlachta run system in the Commonwealth. Catherine and Repnin, acting to protect their own and the Empire's interests, would however disappoint to a large extent the Confederation of Radom petitioners (but thwart much of the reform as well).

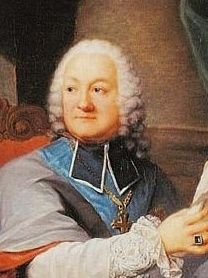
Bishop Kajetan Sołtyk and others were exiled to Russia; they were to be followed on that path by many thousand political activists in the coming years and decades

The humiliated Stanisław August was able to mend his relationship with Catherine and Repnin. At the sejm of 1767 Repnin demanded that the rights of religious minorities be restored. The demand was met with fierce opposition of Catholic zealots, let by Bishop Kajetan Sołtyk, whom Repnin had arrested and exiled into Russia. Repnin was supported by Gabriel Podoski, who became the head of the sejm committee preparing a new constitution of fundamental laws and was rewarded with the job of the primate.

The old rights of religious dissenters, in the spheres of both public functions eligibility and religious practices freedom, were restored first. Catholicism was confirmed as the ruling religion nevertheless and apostasy remained subjected to severe punishments. The Sejm delegation then separated out the "immutable" cardinal laws of the state, including the "free election" of kings, liberum veto, the right to defy the king, nobility exclusive right to hold offices and possession of landed estates, rule over estate peasantry except for the imposition of the death penalty, the legal neminem captivabimus protection, union with the Grand Duchy of Lithuania and separate privileges historically enjoyed by Royal Prussia. The dissenter rights and the cardinal laws were guaranteed by Catherine II, which turned the Commonwealth into a Russian dependency or protectorate, because it was thus declared unable to change its own laws unilaterally.

The remaining matters of the state and of the economy were to be decided by the sejm, with economic issues only subjected to majority voting. Stanisław August was prevented from forming the Permanent Council, a nascent executive government that he had been working on. The proposals were accepted by the "Repnin Sejm" over the protestation of Delegate Józef Wybicki in March 1768. The Radom confederates made peace with the King and for the time being it seemed that Repnin's policies had prevailed and would remain fully triumphant.

=== Confederation of Bar, First Partition, Partition Sejm ===
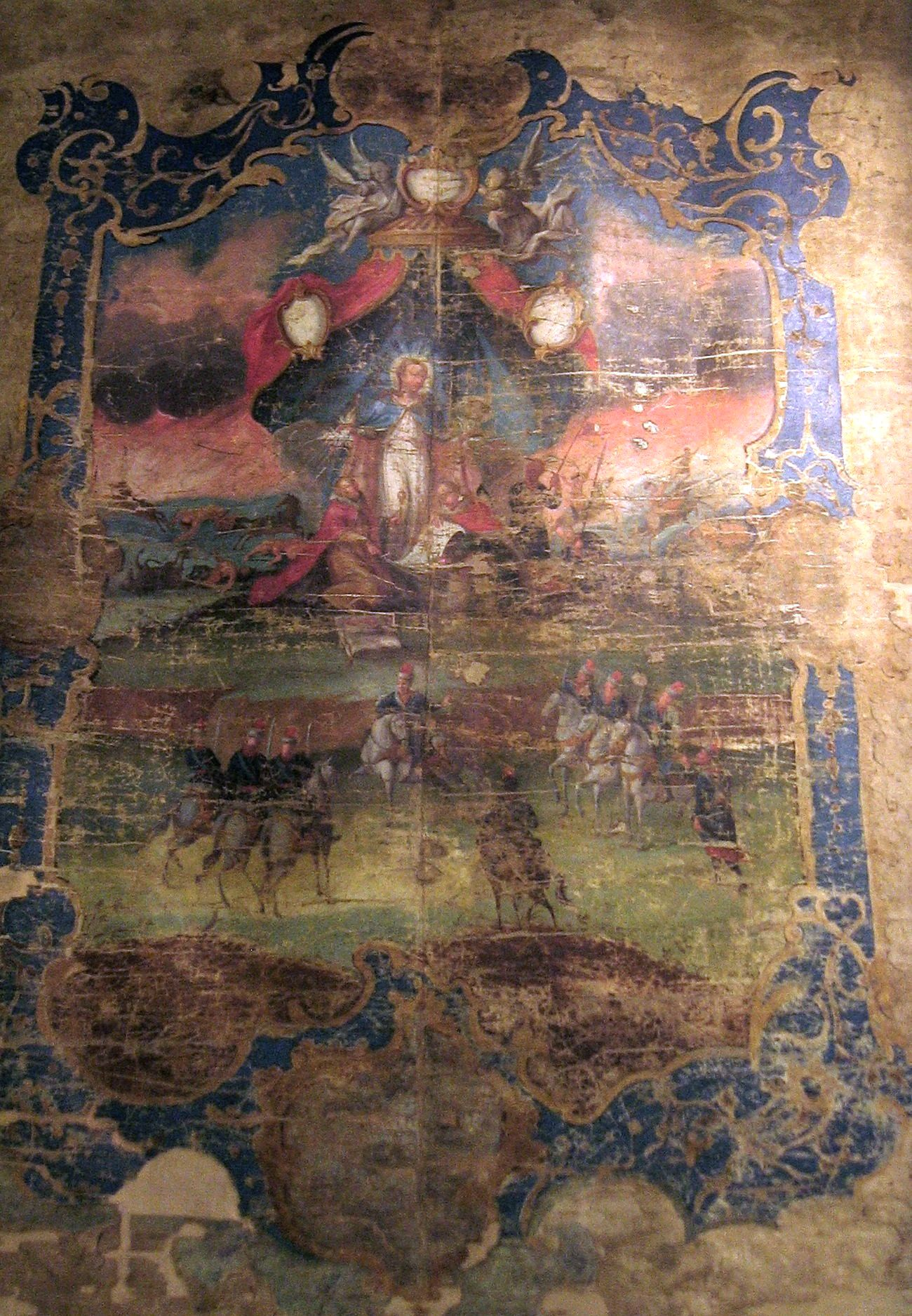
Bar Confederation banner

The Repnin Sejm legislation meant the end of the attempted imposition of reforms by Familia, but brought no peace or stability, as Repnin's ruthless personal rule turned against him both the disappointed magnate oligarchs and the regular gentry, who felt that their "freedoms" were under attack. The Sejm was still in session when on 29 February 1768 the Bar Confederation was formed in Bar in Podolia, with the ostensible goals of preserving the privileges of the Catholic religion and of the szlachta and independence of the state. The handful of local noblemen there were soon joined by their brethren from the surrounding voivodeships and some of the military forces. Józef Pułaski, the Marshal of the Confederation, had however only five thousand men with mediocre equipment at his disposal and they were soon overpowered by the superior Russian and royal Polish forces. The surrender of the confederates under Kazimierz Pułaski in fiercely defended Berdyczów was followed by that of Bar on 20 June. The confederation leaders and the remnants of their army found shelter in Moldavia within the Ottoman Empire, but some more years of unrest and rebellion (1768–1772) were still to follow.

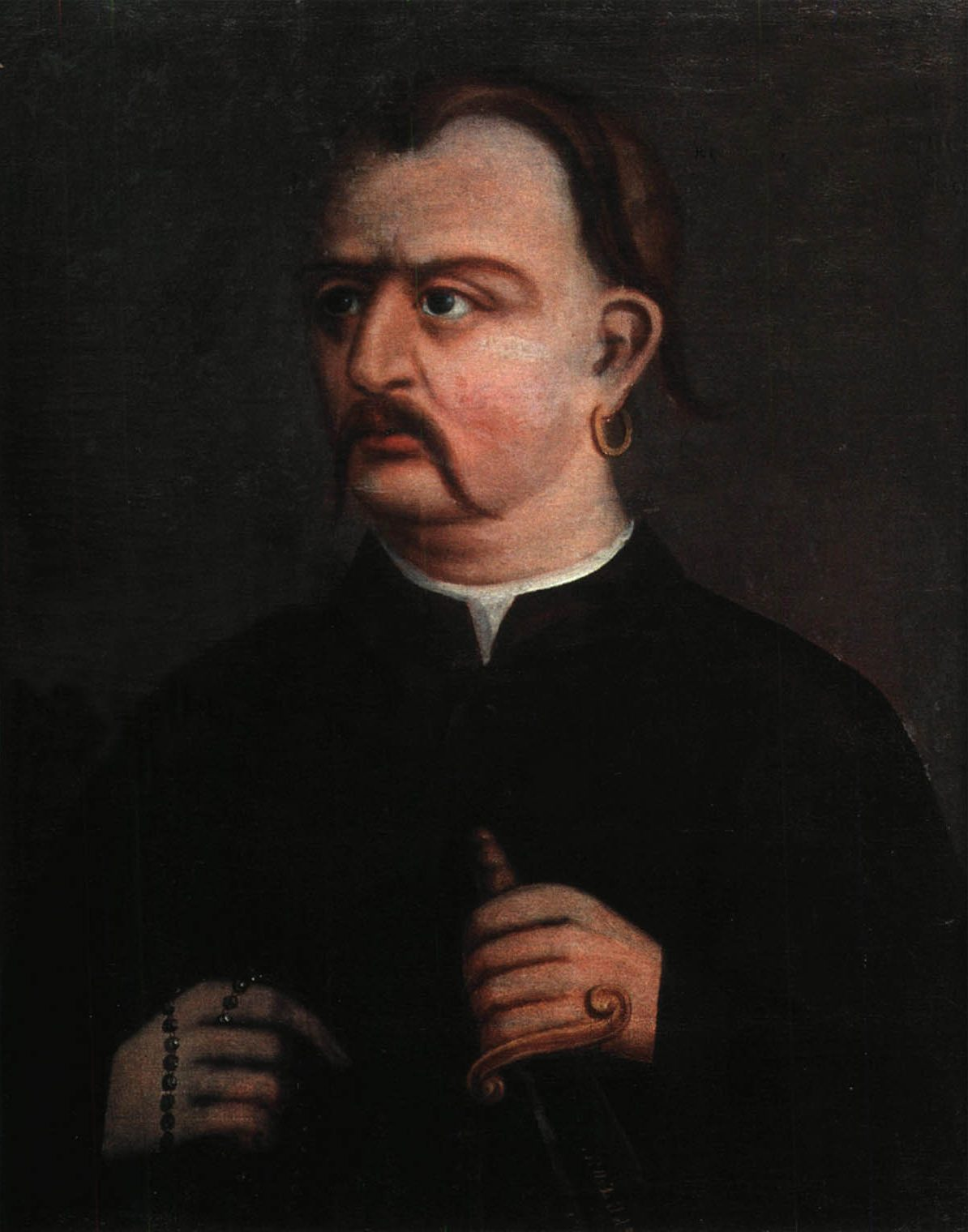
Maksym Zalizniak led a peasant revolt and became a Ukrainian folk hero

The Suplika of Torczyn pamphlet, calling for relief and rights for the peasants, was circulated in Volhynia in 1767. At the time of aggravated tensions among the rural populations, it contributed to the outbreak of Koliyivshchyna, or Ukrainian peasant revolt of 1768, the beginning of which coincided with the subduing of the szlachta uprising in Podolia. The peasant masses were made restless by the rumors of the Uniate Church's takeover of the Orthodox, of the Empress' support for a war against the Polish landowners and by the actual violations committed by the Confederation forces. Their resentment fueled further by the increased burdens that had to do with the expansion of the folwark economy east up to the Dnieper River, they moved violently against the szlachta and their Jewish tenants and property managers. The attacked suffered greatest losses in the town of Humań. The Ukrainian uprising, led by the Cossack commanders Ivan Gonta and Maksym Zalizniak, was ruthlessly suppressed by the Polish Crown and Russian forces, but resulted in disturbances in other parts of the Republic of Both Nations and prevented those, who were to continue the confederate warfare, from appealing to large scale peasant support.

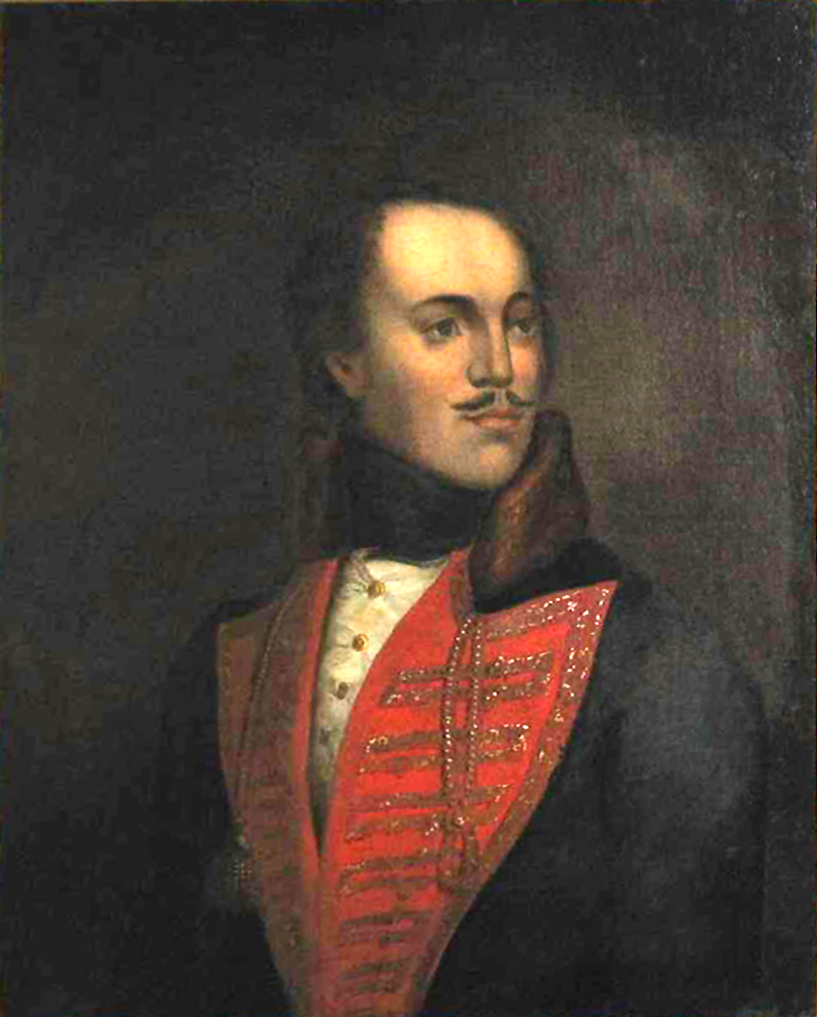
Casimir Pulaski fought in the Confederation of Bar uprising and in the American War of Independence

The szlachta challenges in the meantime picked up steam, as new confederations were being established in the western Crown provinces and in the Grand Duchy of Lithuania. A rebellion in Kraków, which took place soon after the fall of Bar, ended in capitulation after a month-long siege, but it was apparent that the fighting would go on. The outbreak of the Russo-Turkish War in October 1768 gave rise to new hopes for the confederates. France, in whose interest was the weakening of Russia, incited the Ottoman Empire to fight Russia and supported the confederate insurgents with money, arms and professional military cadres, while Austria provided asylum for the confederate supreme authority (the so-called Generality) that had been formed in 1769 in Biała.

The confederates were, however, of divergent goals and interests. The magnate oligarchy wanted to remove Stanisław August and replace him with a Wettin ruler. The Generality declared the King's dethronement in 1770, just as Stanisław August contemplated the feasibility of abandoning Catherine and reaching an understanding with the Bar Confederation movement. The middle nobility fought for national independence, but under conservative assumptions of inviolability of their own privileged position as well as of that of the Catholic Church, which limited the appeal of the entire undertaking (the army of the nobility-dominated uprising was mostly non-noble and the cities sympathized with the King). 200,000 had served in the armed insurrection, but no more than 10 to 20 thousand at any given time. The cavalry lacked equipment, discipline and training, the army as a whole lacked professional unified command and a significant infantry component. The ready-to-sacrifice confederates were no match for the Russian adversary, both in terms of military quality and quantity. The insurgency strategy was based on partisan harassment conducted at changing locales, which was ruining the country without generating a realistic possibility of ultimate victory.

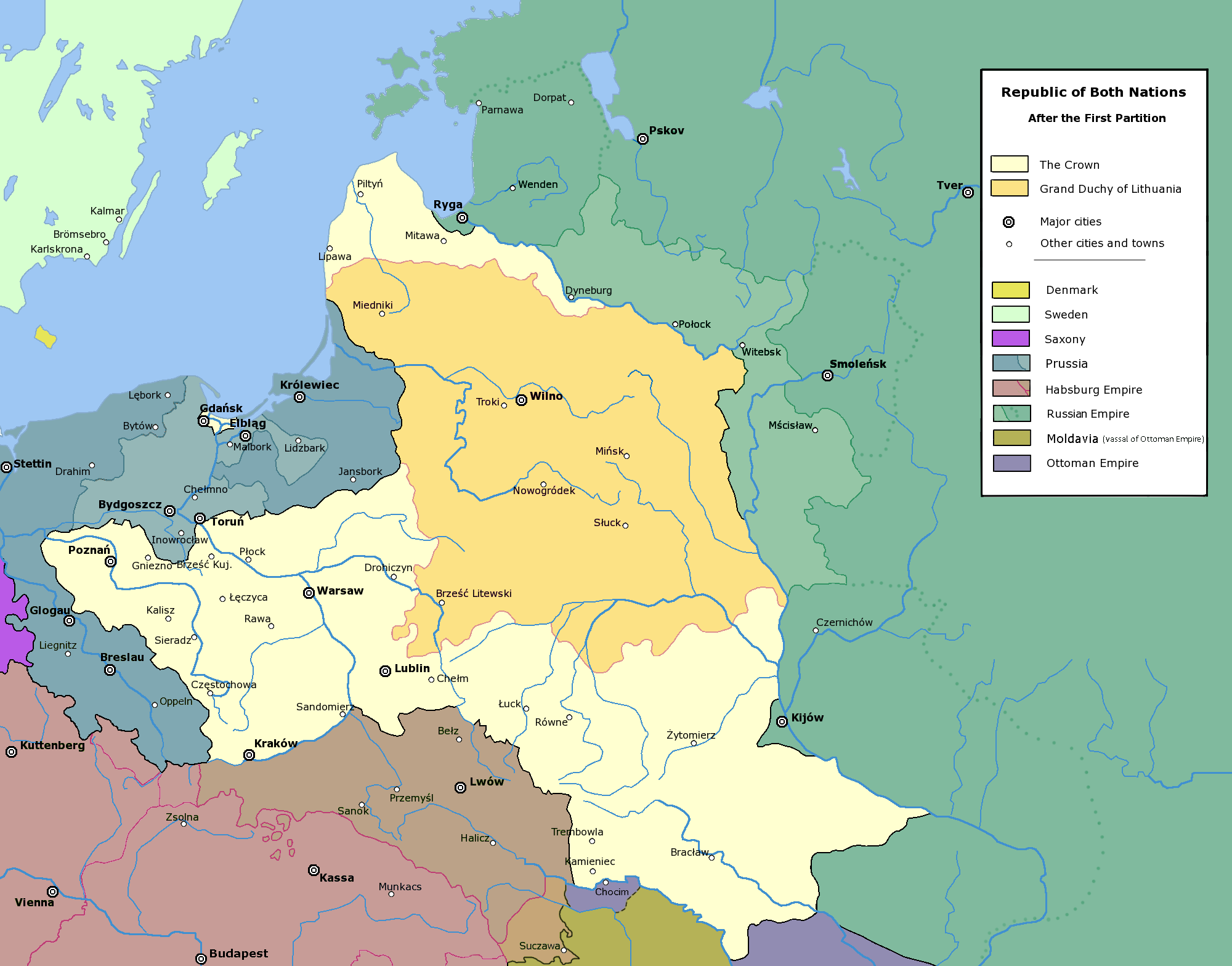
The Crown of Poland and the Grand Duchy of Lithuania after the First Partition in 1772

At the end of 1770 the confederates, led by the French adviser General Charles François Dumouriez and the insurgency's best commander Kazimierz Pułaski, attempted to establish a permanent line of defense along the banks of the upper Vistula, but they were able to hold onto Lanckorona and Tyniec only for a significant period. Attempts to renew fighting in Lithuania were unsuccessful, while Józef Zaremba achieved only temporary military gains in Greater Poland. The abortive abduction of the King in 1771 lessened the domestic and foreign support for the Confederation. In 1772, the forces of the foreign partition operation entered the country and the movement was nearing its end. The Wawel Castle garrison kept on resisting, and then, until 18 August, only the Częstochowa fortress under Kazimierz Pułaski. The uprising ended and the confederate leaders left the country.

The Confederation of Bar forced a reevaluation of the Repnin-led strategy of Russia (and caused the downfall of the powerful envoy). The Empire, distracted militarily at the time of its major war with Turkey, decided to agree to the reduction of the territory of Russia's troublesome Polish ally, promoted by Frederick II the Great of Prussia, which led to the First Partition of the Polish–Lithuanian Commonwealth.

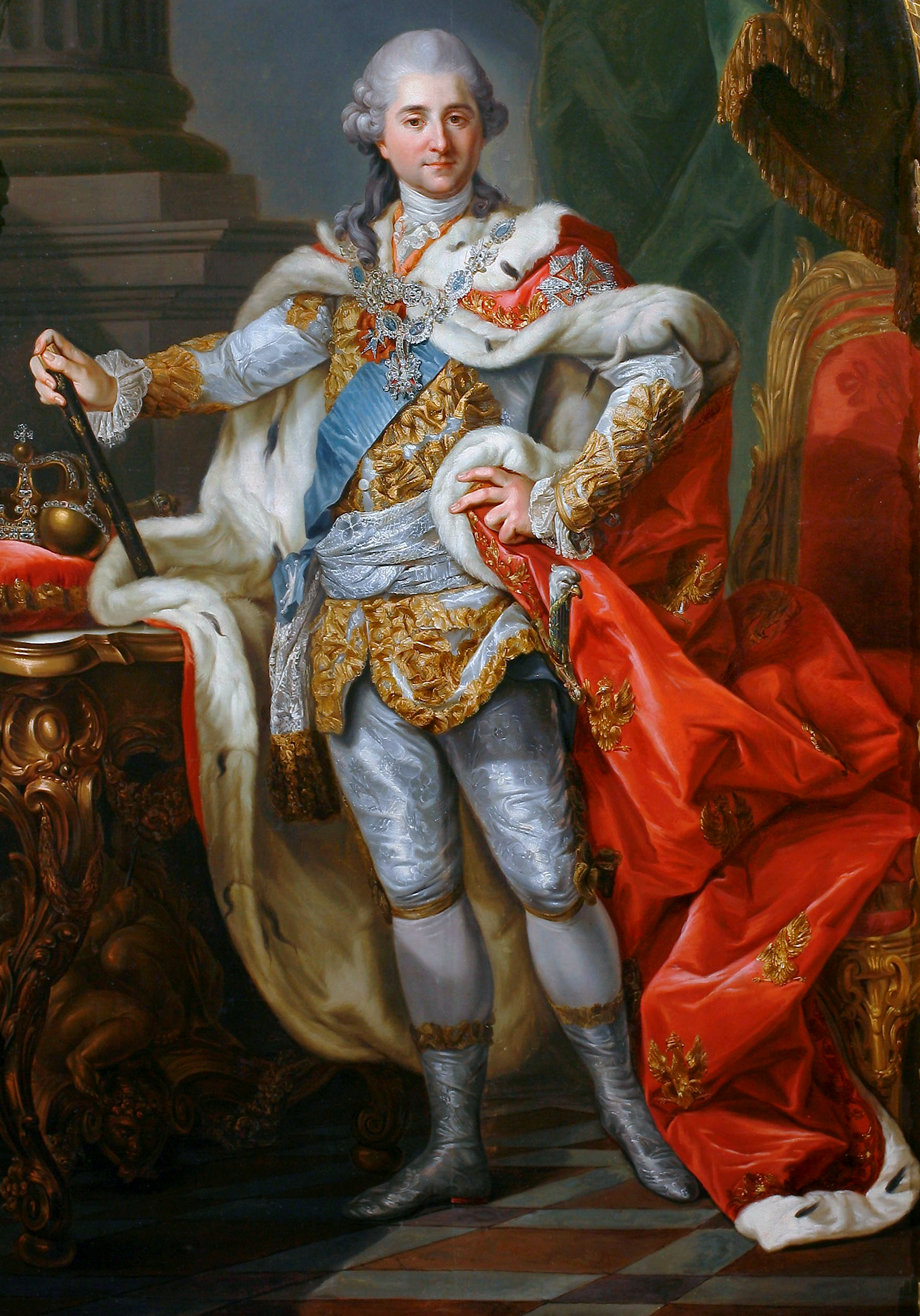
Stanisław August Poniatowski at the time of his coronation

The Kingdom of Prussia, having conquered Silesia, directed its expansion-oriented activities toward the mouth of the Vistula and Royal Prussia (a province of the Commonwealth) in general. But the first actual steps in the partitioning process were taken by Austria, which in 1769 took Spisz and in the following year the counties of Czorsztyn, Nowy Targ and Nowy Sącz. Frederick, who followed with the de facto territorial acquisitions of his own, cooperated with Joseph II, and when Catherine II was ready, the three commenced partition negotiations. The Russo-Prussian agreement was signed in early 1772 and then joined by Austria. The actual new borders were determined in the convention signed in St. Petersburg on 5 August 1772. The convention listed the decay of the state, anarchy and factionalism among the justifications for the partitioning of the Commonwealth's territories. At the time of the First Partition, Austria and Prussia most eagerly pursued the dismemberment of their weak neighbor and grabbed significant chunks of Polish lands, beyond the sometimes vague specifications of the convention; the eastern Grand Duchy parts and Inflanty Voivodeship (Polish Livonia) taken by Russia were of a more marginal importance.

Prussia, the initiator of the partition scheme, gained Ermland (Warmia), Pomerelia (Gdańsk Pomerania), Marienburg (Malbork) Voivodeship, Culmer Land (Chełmno Land) and middle-upper Noteć (Netze) River basin, but without Danzig (Gdańsk) and Thorn (Toruń), an area of 36,000 km^{2} with 580,000 inhabitants. Austria took the southern parts of the Kraków and Sandomierz Voivodeships and the Ruthenian Voivodeship, a total of 83,000 km^{2} and 2.65 million residents. Vienna bureaucrats gave the occupied area the name of Galicia and Lodomeria. The Russian partition amounted to 92,000 km^{2} and 1.3 million people. The army of the Commonwealth, 10,000 men at the most, attempted no resistance.

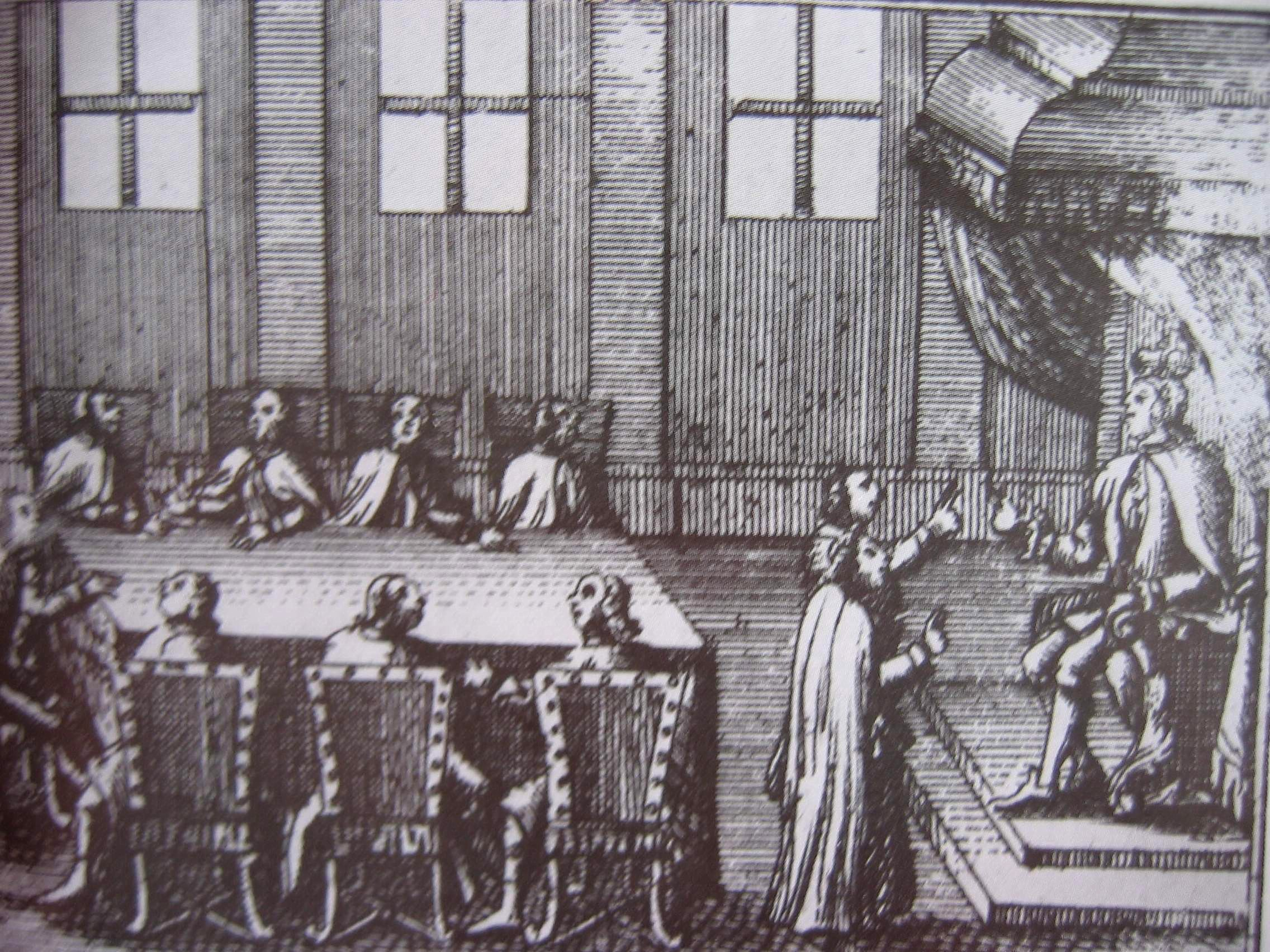
The Permanent Council presided over by the King

The first partition left a still viable Poland-Lithuania (it became a buffer state for the three competing powers), but the country's economic potential was greatly reduced. Prussia controlled the lower Vistula, and therefore Polish agricultural exports; the salt mines were lost to Austria. Large concentrations of Poles now lived within the Prussian and Austrian states, which subjected them to Germanization pressures and lowered the percentage of ethnically Polish population in the remaining Commonwealth.

The partitioning powers demanded that the Commonwealth officially approves of the partition and threatened further encroachments in case of refusal. King Stanisław August appealed to the European courts, but only individuals, including Jean-Jacques Rousseau, Gabriel Bonnot de Mably and Edmund Burke, condemned the partition. The "Partition Sejm" was summoned in 1773 and despite the objections of some of the deputies (notably Tadeusz Rejtan and Samuel Korsak), ratified under duress the partition convention. Unfavorable trade agreements, especially with Prussia, were also imposed. The partitioning powers were obviously inclined to intervene in the Polish affairs at will and the future of the Republic of Both Nations looked ominous.

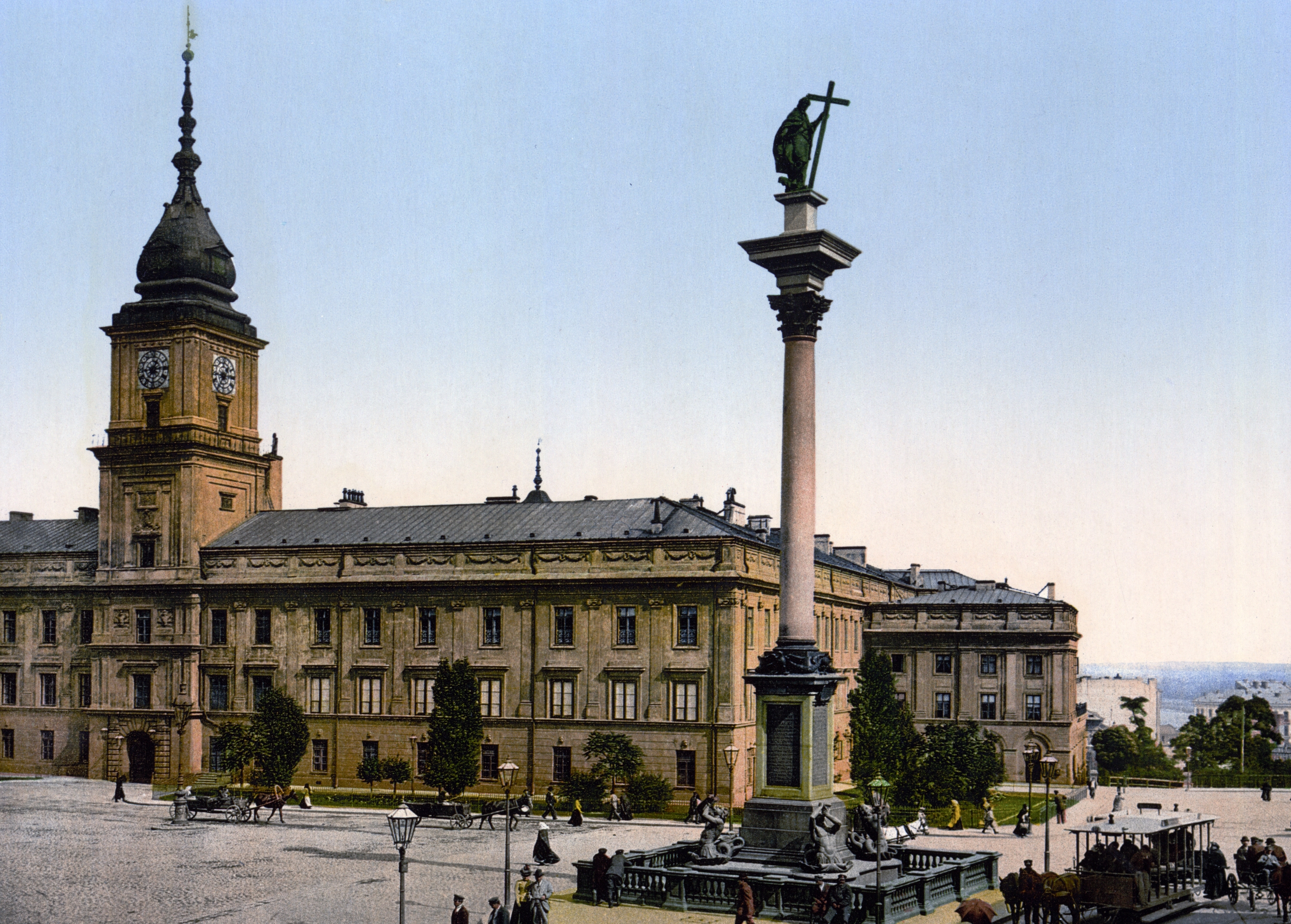
The Royal Castle in Warsaw was in Stanisław August's time the place of meetings of the intellectual and creative elite

The Partition Sejm of 1773-1775 also instituted limited, but not insignificant improvements in the diminished state's political system and government. Frederick II and the Russian leader Nikita Panin had already decided not to allow substantial changes in the areas previously defined as the "cardinal laws". Their point of view was represented by Gédéon Benoît and the new Russian ambassador Otto Magnus von Stackelberg. The domestic opposition or reform factions had become exhausted. The Bar Confederation movement activists emigrated or were exiled to Siberia, Familia as well as the King that they bickered with now lacked broad popular support on the one hand and confidence of Empress Catherine on the other. Under the circumstances, the leading role was assumed by more mediocre personalities, such Marshal Adam Poniński, who led deliberations of the Partition Sejm.

To prevent liberum veto disruptions the Sejm was set up as a confederation and a special delegation was convened to prepare and propose the new sejm "constitution" (legislation). The main controversy erupted over the issue of the establishment and form of the Permanent Council (Rada Nieustająca, an executive government), the need for which had become obvious by that time. The magnate clique led by August Kazimierz Sułkowki wanted to curtail decisively the influence of the King. But Stanisław August was able to convince the Russian interests of the need for an efficient government and create a council, where some of his prerogatives would be limited, but to a greater degree those of the previously very powerful magnate ministers, who were placed under the control of the new council. The Council, established finally in 1775, was led by the King, had 36 members elected, half from each chamber of the Sejm, and ruled by majority vote (the King decided in case of a tie). The ministers were supervised by five parallel departments of the Council: Foreign Interests, Police or Good Order, Military, Justice and Treasury. The Council, in addition to its administrative duties, would present to the King three candidates for each nomination to the Senate and other main offices.

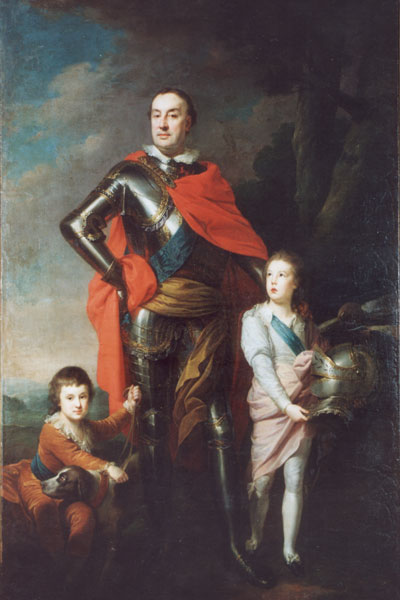
Franciszek Ksawery Branicki, the King's dedicated supporter who became his nemesis

The army, modernized and reorganized, was to be enlarged to 30,000 and supported by taxes and customs introduced within the postulated treasury reform. Economic difficulties prevented, as on many occasions before, the accomplishment of the goals and the state was able to maintain only a half of the intended armed forces.

The one indisputable achievement of the 1773-1775 sejm was the establishment of the Commission of National Education, through which the country's educational system was to be modernized. Szlachta was allowed to engage in "urban" professions and improvements in the legal standing of their subjects were discussed, but not acted upon. The cardinal laws were gathered again, foreigners and children and grandchildren of a given ruler were prohibited from assuming the crown of the Commonwealth. The legislation produced was validated with guarantees from all three partitioning powers.

Rada Nieustająca council and its prerogatives were to be challenged by magnate opposition led by Franciszek Ksawery Branicki, who tried to discredit before the Empress' court the new power establishment (the King, the Council and Ambassador Stackelberg). Their efforts were not successful and in 1776 the Military Department of the Council took over the practical control over the army and significant reductions of the power traditionally wielded by the hetmans were implemented. The King would nominate officers and command the Guard. The goal of the increase in the size of the military was ultimately abandoned.

The reforms of the Partition Sejm, subject to intrigue and obstruction and never fully put into effect (especially the treasury-military aspects), had however become the necessary foundation for the establishment of the emerging "Republic Enlightened" movement. This turned out to be the case even though this sejm lacked (besides the monarch) enlightened leaders, like the ones that would soon become prominent in the era of the approaching Great Sejm reforms.

== Great Sejm and its reforms ==
=== Zamoyski Code, formation of the reform camp and reform proposals ===
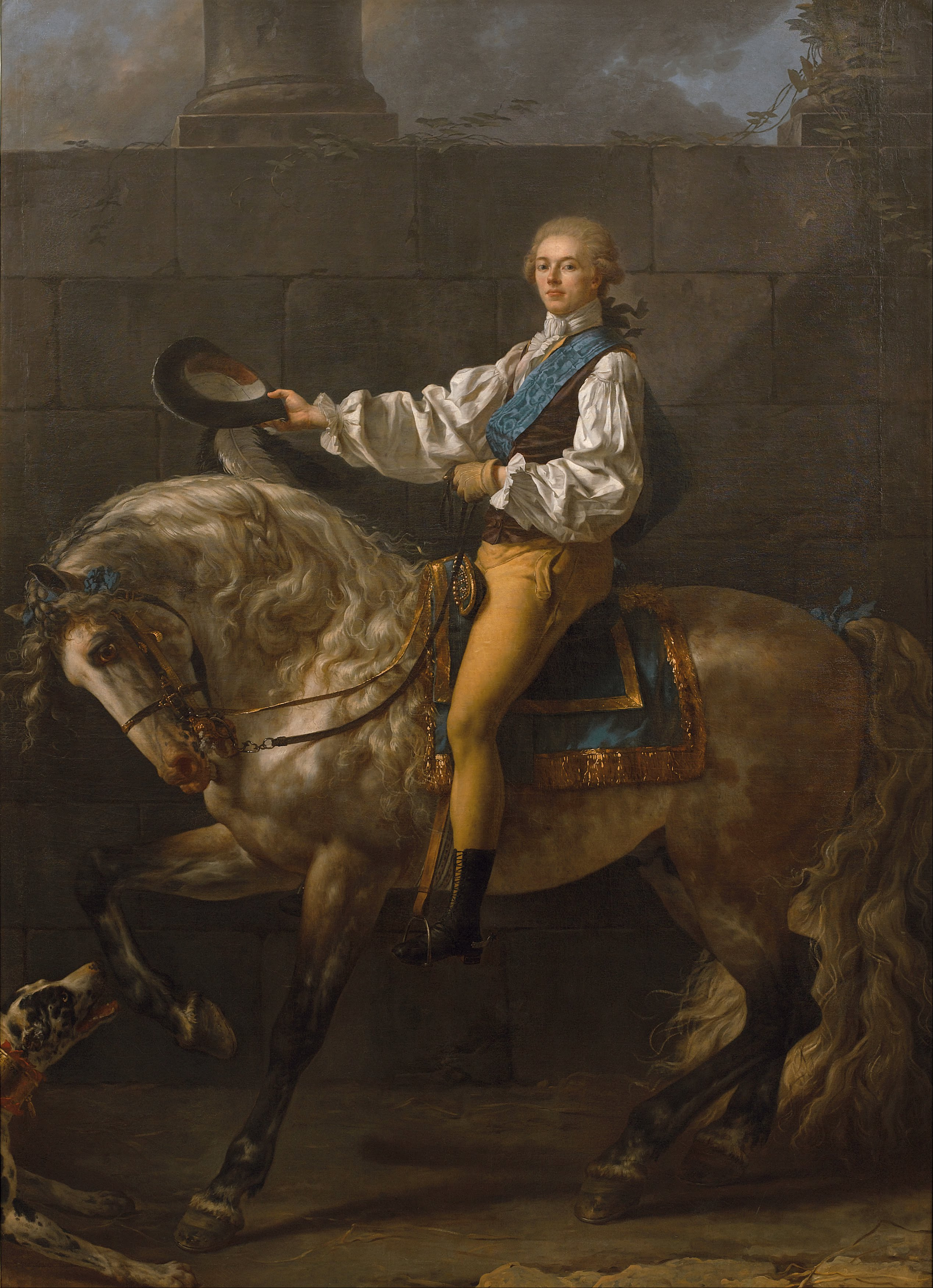
Stanisław Kostka Potocki; painting by Jacques-Louis David

The attempts to reform and save the disintegrating Commonwealth had thus far achieved a small measure of success, while the country had lost chunks of its territory. It became apparent that a more fundamental renewal would be possible only after the younger, more enlightened magnates and broader masses of middle nobility involved themselves and supported the reform processes and goals. It was an uphill struggle, as most magnates still actively opposed the King (a diverse but cooperating younger oligarchy that included Adam Kazimierz Czartoryski, Ignacy Potocki, Stanisław Kostka Potocki, Franciszek Ksawery Branicki, Seweryn Rzewuski and Michał Kazimierz Ogiński), while the nobility below tended to be conservative and politically disoriented.

A great battle was fought over the Zamoyski Code. Andrzej Zamoyski, the former Crown Chancellor and Repnin's opponent, was commissioned by the sejm of 1776 to work on a legal code, aimed at unification of the laws of the Commonwealth. Among Zamoyski's collaborators were the reformers Joachim Chreptowicz and Józef Wybicki. Wybicki wrote in 1777 the Patriotic Letters, where he expounded the reform movement's main themes: strengthening of the central government and the new postulated relationships among the social classes, including in particular improvements in the condition of townspeople and peasants.

The proposed code dealt with some of those matters, without disturbing the szlachta's fundamental privileges. For example, the larger cities would be able to send limited representations to sejm sessions, or, what was found by the detractors to be particularly offensive, mixed nobility-peasant marriages would be allowed. Papal bulls could be published only with permission from the state, which caused the Papal Nuncio Giovanni Andrea Archetti to energetically oppose, with the help of Ambassador Stackelberg, the proposed laws. Demagogic propaganda easily convinced the szlachta deputies and the sejm of 1780 decisively and amid hysterical uproar rejected the Code.

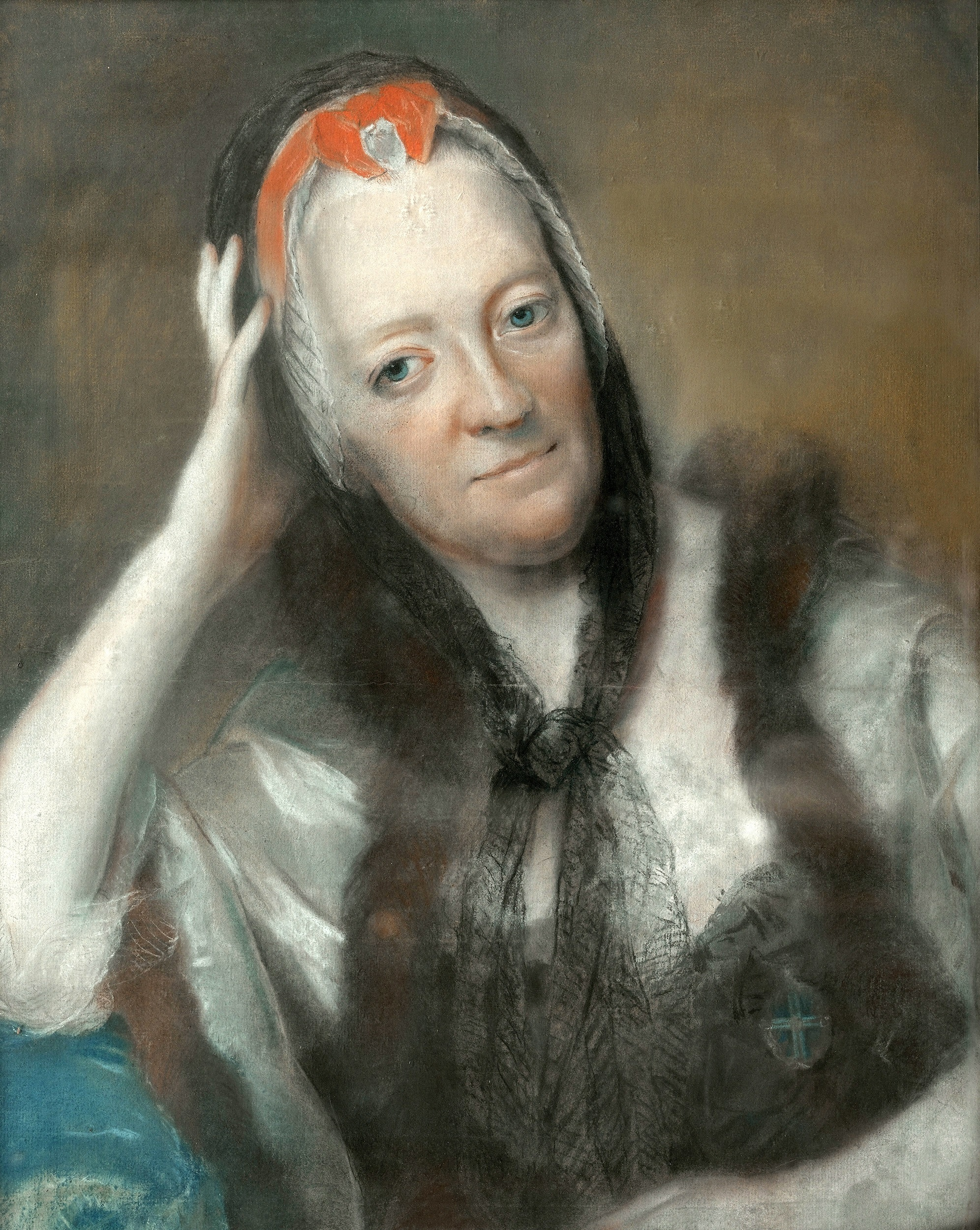
Katarzyna Kossakowska

During the 1780s, further polarization among the szlachta ruling class was taking place, but the reform camp was also getting stronger, because to many the necessity and inevitability of changes were becoming more apparent. The most conservative of the magnates postulated complete decentralization (in effect dissolution) of centers of power, but their progressive, enlightened young generation was increasingly following the path to effective reform. Political restlessness had taken hold also among the remaining social classes and found its expression in an unprecedented explosion of published polemical materials. Unofficial opinion-forming centers were active, including salon societies, such as the ones led by Izabela Czartoryska or Katarzyna Kossakowska, and Freemasonry.

In the period preceding the Great Sejm, the writings and activities of politically independent scientists and reformers Stanisław Staszic and Hugo Kołłątaj were of particular importance. Both were members of Catholic clergy, but neither refrained from assuming at times socially radical positions.

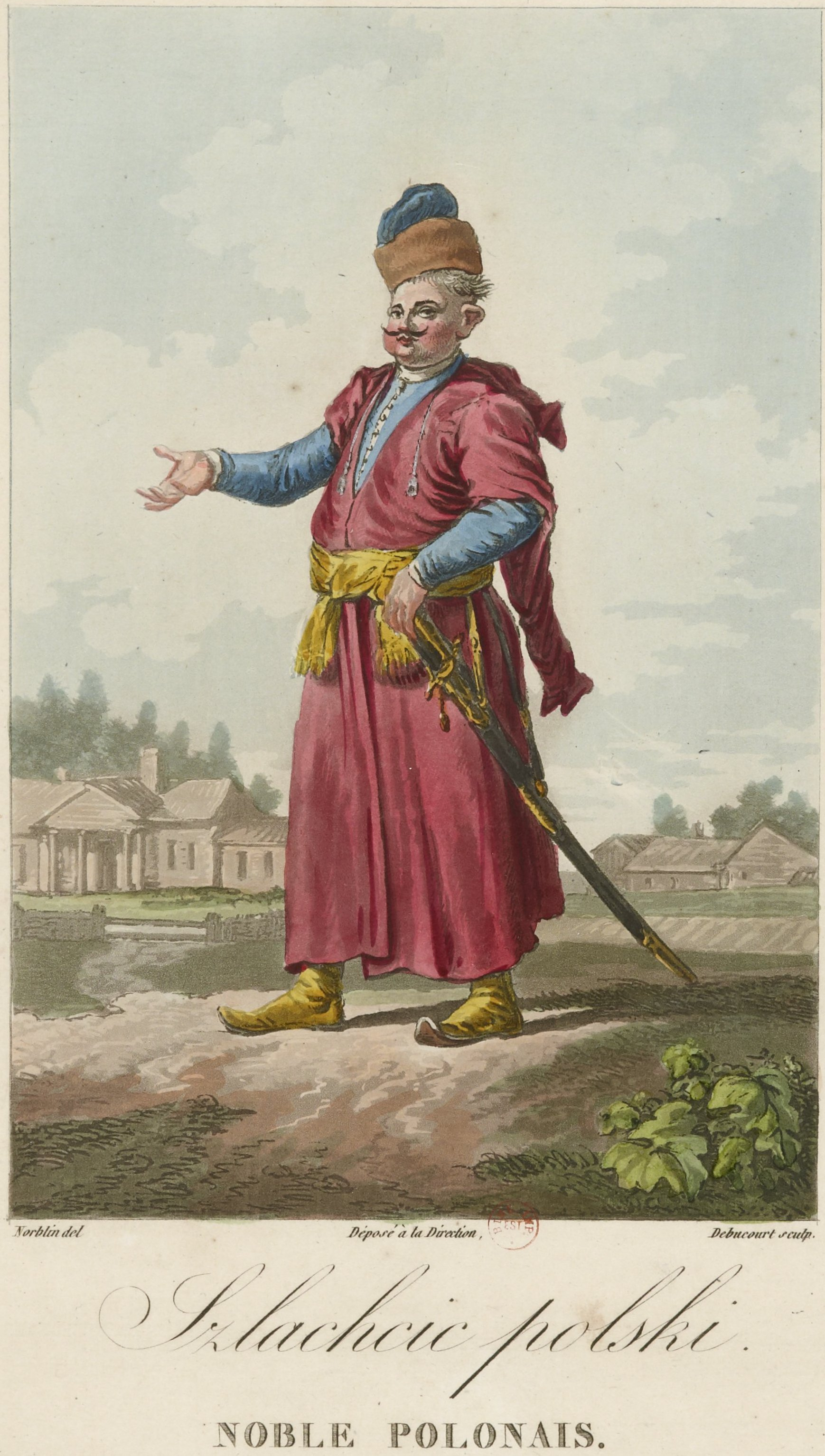
A Polish nobleman, by Jean-Pierre Norblin

Stanisław Staszic (1755–1826) originated from a burgher family in Piła, extensively studied abroad, especially in Paris, and became the mentor of Andrzej Zamoyski's children. He published two important works: Remarks on the Life of Jan Zamoyski (1785) and Warnings for Poland (1787). Staszic advocated strengthening of royal power, hereditary succession, majority voting in the sejm and equal representation for townspeople and nobility there (as well as equal rights in general). The army had to be enlarged. Of the most fundamental importance were to him social and economic policies. He wanted domestic trade and crafts protected. The critically oppressed peasant class needed state protection and reform of their labor obligations; he saw their condition as the principal reason for the weakness of the Commonwealth. Staszic blamed the magnate class for the deteriorated state of the country.

Hugo Kołłątaj (1750–1812) was more of a political activist. He originated from middle nobility of Volhynia. Kołłątaj studied in Rome and then became actively involved in the work of the Commission of National Education, especially conducting the reform of the Academy of Kraków. He wrote Anonymous Letters to Stanisław Małachowski and Political Right of the Polish Nation (both completed by 1790). Kołłątaj's views, close to those of Staszic, were more tactically adjustable to the opportunities of the moment and thus not free of contradictions. In the Great Sejm era he became the principal leader of the patriotic camp. Somewhat less radical than Staszic on social issues, Kołłątaj nevertheless made the assertion "the land where man is a slave cannot claim freedom". His principal concern was the reform of national government and some of his postulates found their ultimate expression in the Constitution of May 3, 1791, which he co-wrote.

The young Józef Pawlikowski defended the serfs in the strongest of terms. He wrote On Polish Subjects (1788) and Political Thoughts for Poland (1790). He also promoted strong royal power, reining in the excesses of szlachta and political rights for townspeople.

Kołłątaj's Forge group gave the fullest expression to anti-noble sentiments and condemnation of the near-anarchy brought about by the privileged. Plebeian values and the early French Revolution examples were frequently invoked. Franciszek Salezy Jezierski published in 1790 Sieyès' What Is the Third Estate? in Polish as The Ghost of the Late Bastille. The program of the French bourgeois was adopted, tailored to the situation in the Commonwealth and used as still another argument in the fight for the betterment of the Republic.

=== Great Sejm and May 3, 1791 Constitution ===
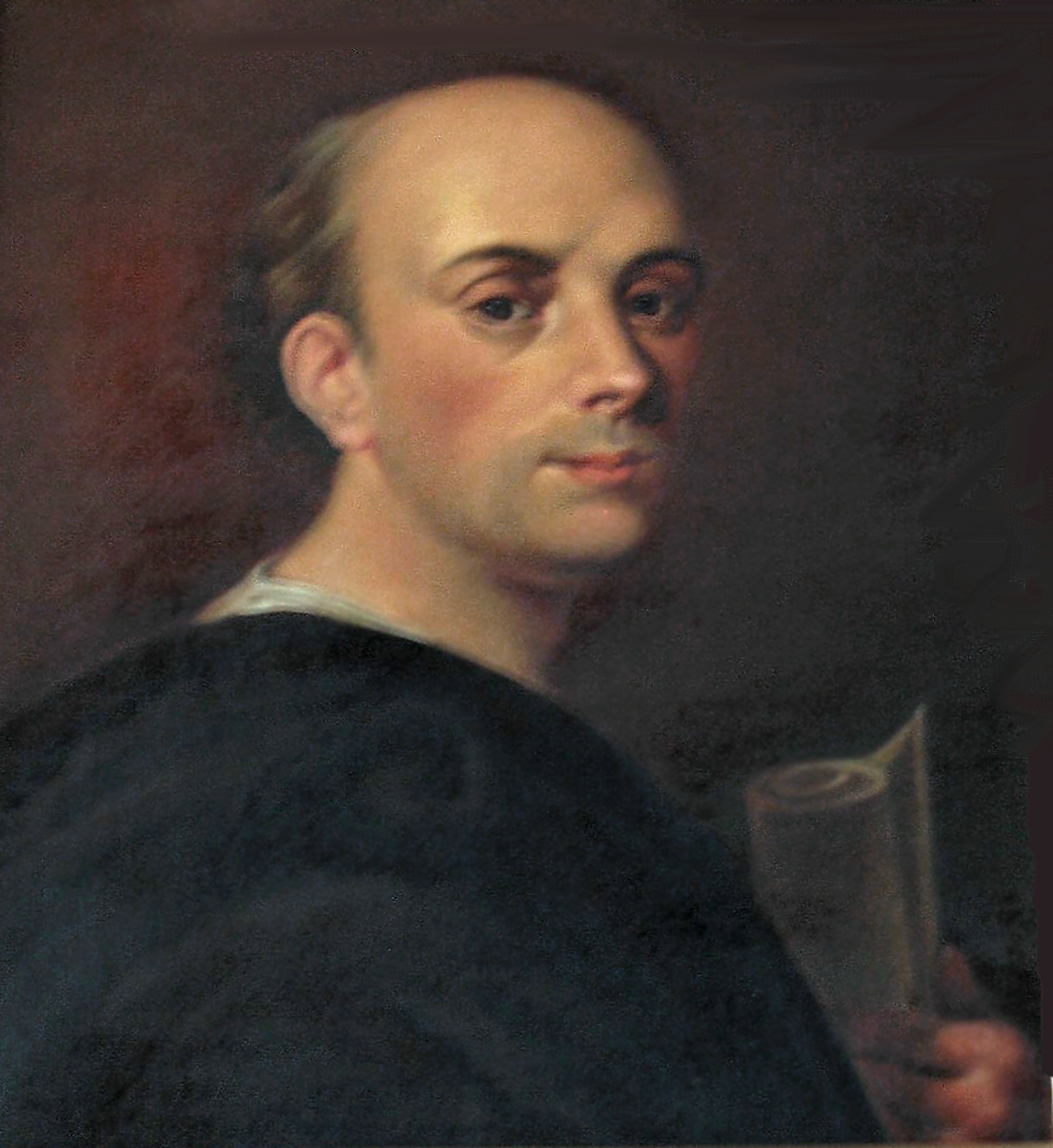
Scipione Piattoli by Marcello Bacciarelli

Success of the reform program depended not only on sufficient domestic support, but also on favorable international configuration of forces in central-eastern Europe. Of crucial importance would be breaking-up of the Russo-Prussian alliance. The War of the Bavarian Succession (1778–1779) and the Austro-Prussian conflict there resulted in no improvements in the situation of the Commonwealth. The United States War of Independence then assumed an international dimension and preoccupied West European interests. Its course was also observed and closely followed in the Commonwealth and many Poles, including Tadeusz Kościuszko and Casimir Pulaski, took part in the fighting on the colonists side.

A new situation in Europe resulted from the Russian takeover of Crimea and the death of Frederick II. Prussia, allied with Britain and the Netherlands, developed an antagonistic relationship also with Russia, which together with Austria seemed to threaten the existence of the Ottoman Empire. Among the military and diplomatic moves and maneuvering taking place, Poland was encouraged to engage in closer cooperation with Prussia and to confront Russia, which encountered interest and willingness on the part of some circles and participants in the Commonwealth politics.

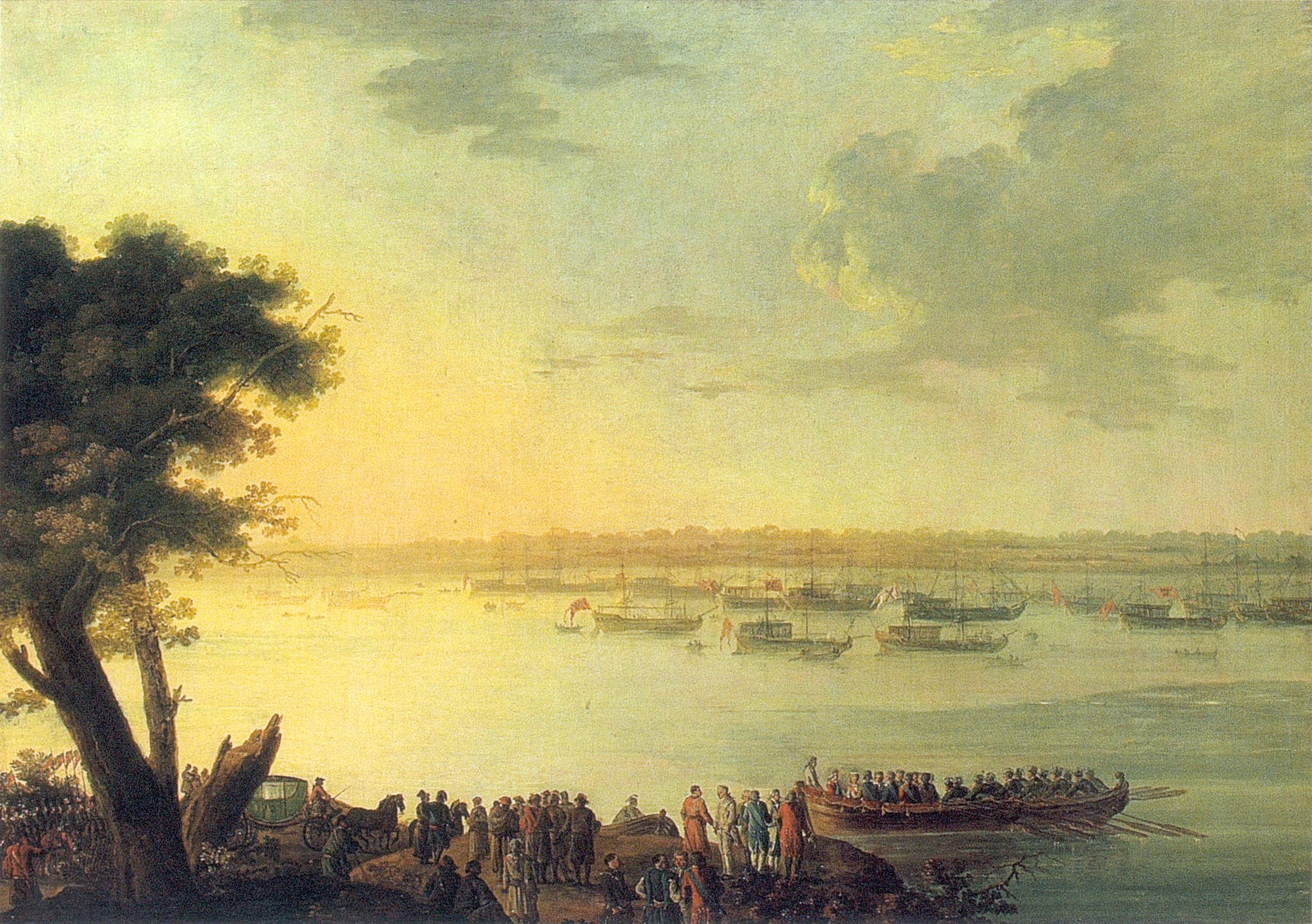
Empress Catherine leaving Kaniv in 1787

There was the self-proclaimed Patriotic Party, led by aristocrats of pro-British and pro-Prussian sympathies, annoyed by the tsarist interventions in the Commonwealth, opposed to King Stanisław August and his pro-Russian policies. This faction was represented by members of the Puławy group: Adam Kazimierz Czartoryski, Ignacy and Stanisław Potocki, and their associate Scipione Piattoli, an Italian active in Polish politics. They counted on a Polish–Prussian alliance they had envisaged as a means for regaining lands lost to the other partitioning powers, especially Austria. The other group of influential oligarchs was led by Seweryn Rzewuski, Franciszek Ksawery Branicki and Szczęsny Potocki. Their faction's previous unsuccessful experience with the Radom Confederation notwithstanding, in order to establish a magnate-ruled decentralized republic, they tried to overthrow the King, but with Russian help.

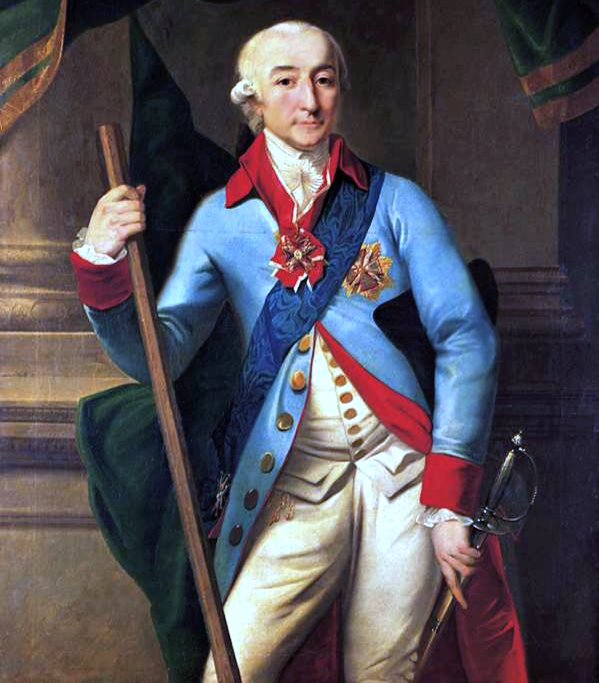
Marshal Stanisław Małachowski led the Four-Year Sejm

Stanisław August himself went to Kaniv in Ukraine in 1787 to meet his former lover, Empress Catherine. He was hoping to get her to agree to the enlargement of the Commonwealth's army and his own increased power, offering in return help in Russia's war with the Ottoman Empire. Although the Empress was in no mood for making concessions at that time, in the following year, because of the war difficulties, Russia proposed a defense treaty and a participation of a Polish corps in the hostilities. In order to formalize the military alliance and strengthen the Commonwealth's forces, the King summoned a sejm to deliberate in Warsaw in the fall of 1788.

A confederation was set up and was led by the marshals, Stanisław Małachowski and Kazimierz Nestor Sapieha. Unexpectedly, the deliberations of the Great Sejm took four years.

The pro-Russian camp, charged with accomplishing the above goals, turned out to be ineffective. It consisted of the itself non-uniform, conservative anti-King faction on the one hand (the hetmans' party proper of Ksawery Branicki and Seweryn Rzewuski and other magnate-led groups, including the one of Szczęsny Potocki), and the King and his diverse "court party" on the other. The King's supporters included Chancellor Jacek Małachowski and perceived an alliance with Russia as a necessary element of Polish politics.

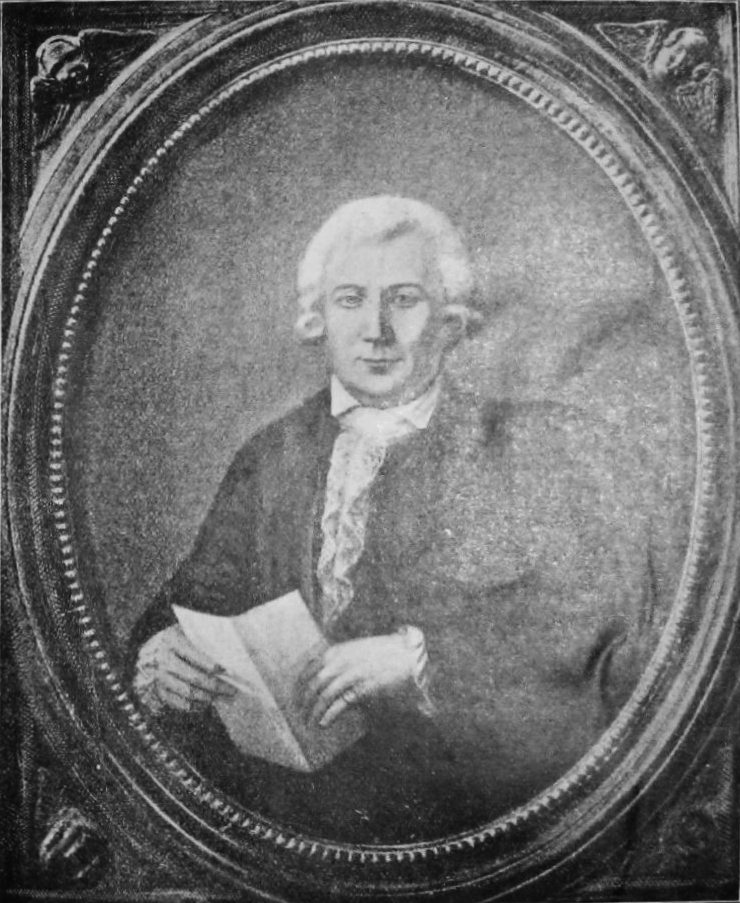
Jan Dekert, President of Warsaw and leader of the Black Procession

The lack of unity and conflicts within the pro-Russian camp were taken advantage of by the possibly more numerous patriotic camp, advocates of reforms seeking independence from Russia with the help of an alliance with Prussia. The Puławy group and Stanisław Małachowski belonged here and they were often directed by Hugo Kołłątaj, himself not a sejm deputy. The patriotic camp had become dominant in the Sejm and was eventually able to convince the King to join their cause and to largely push through the legislative measures they favored.

The early events of the French Revolution were taking place when the Great Sejm was in session. Accordingly, as feudal interests in Europe were being threatened, close attention was paid in Poland to the views expressed by burgher publicists and burgher leaders wanted to take advantage of the situation. Advised by Kołłątaj, Jan Dekert, President of Warsaw, summoned in November 1789 representatives of 141 royal cities to the Polish capital. There they signed the "Act of Unification of the Cities" and formed the Black Procession, which headed for the Royal Castle and handed in their postulates of greatly increased political and economic rights for residents of towns to the King and the Sejm. The 1789 peasant unrest also added to the fears of the revolution spreading to the Commonwealth. The sejm debate conducted against this background soon resulted in dramatic determinations.

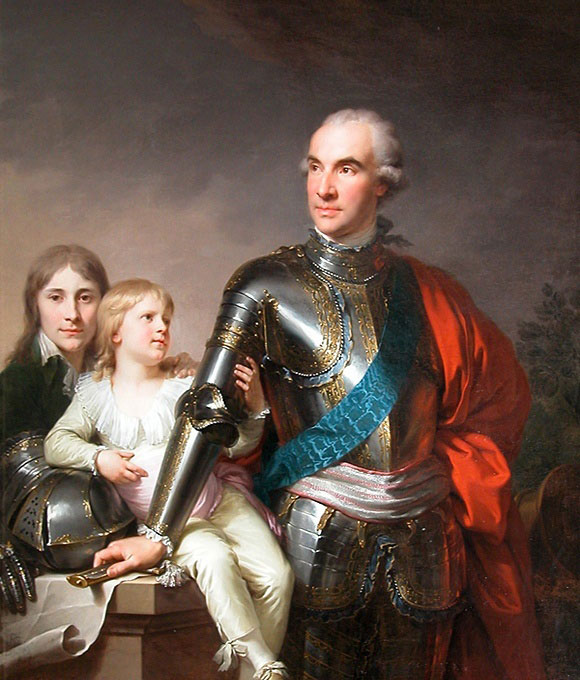
Stanisław Szczęsny Potocki

Prussian ambassador Ludwig Heinrich Buchholtz effectively proposed a replacement of the existing Polish-Russian alliance with a Polish–Prussian alliance, which to many sejm deputies seemed like a good opportunity for getting rid of the Russian protectorate. The Prussian offer was accepted, despite the opposition from the King and Ambassador Stackelberg and anti-Russian legislative measures were adopted. The greatly enlarged army would be 100,000 men strong. The control over the military was taken away from the hetmans and the Permanent Council and the new Military Commission was established; the Permanent Council, seen as an instrument of Russian meddling, was then eliminated. Strict neutrality was to be observed in respect to Russia's war with the Ottoman Empire and foreign forces were to leave the Commonwealth territory.

The general enthusiasm generated by the reform had not been matched by a readiness to provide the necessary resources. The already partially reformed military consisted of no more than 18,500 soldiers (1788), and to enlarge that force, greatly improved finances and conscription methods were needed. With a half-year delay, in 1789 the Sejm passed a permanent 10% tax on szlachta profits, 20% on the income of the Catholic Church and other tax reforms. Municipal tax burdens had been repeatedly increased, but many rural property owners balked at paying their share and the Sejm was forced to reduce the numerical goal for the army to 65,000. Anachronistically small numbers were projected for the infantry component (about 50%), to provide employment for szlachta volunteers in the cavalry.

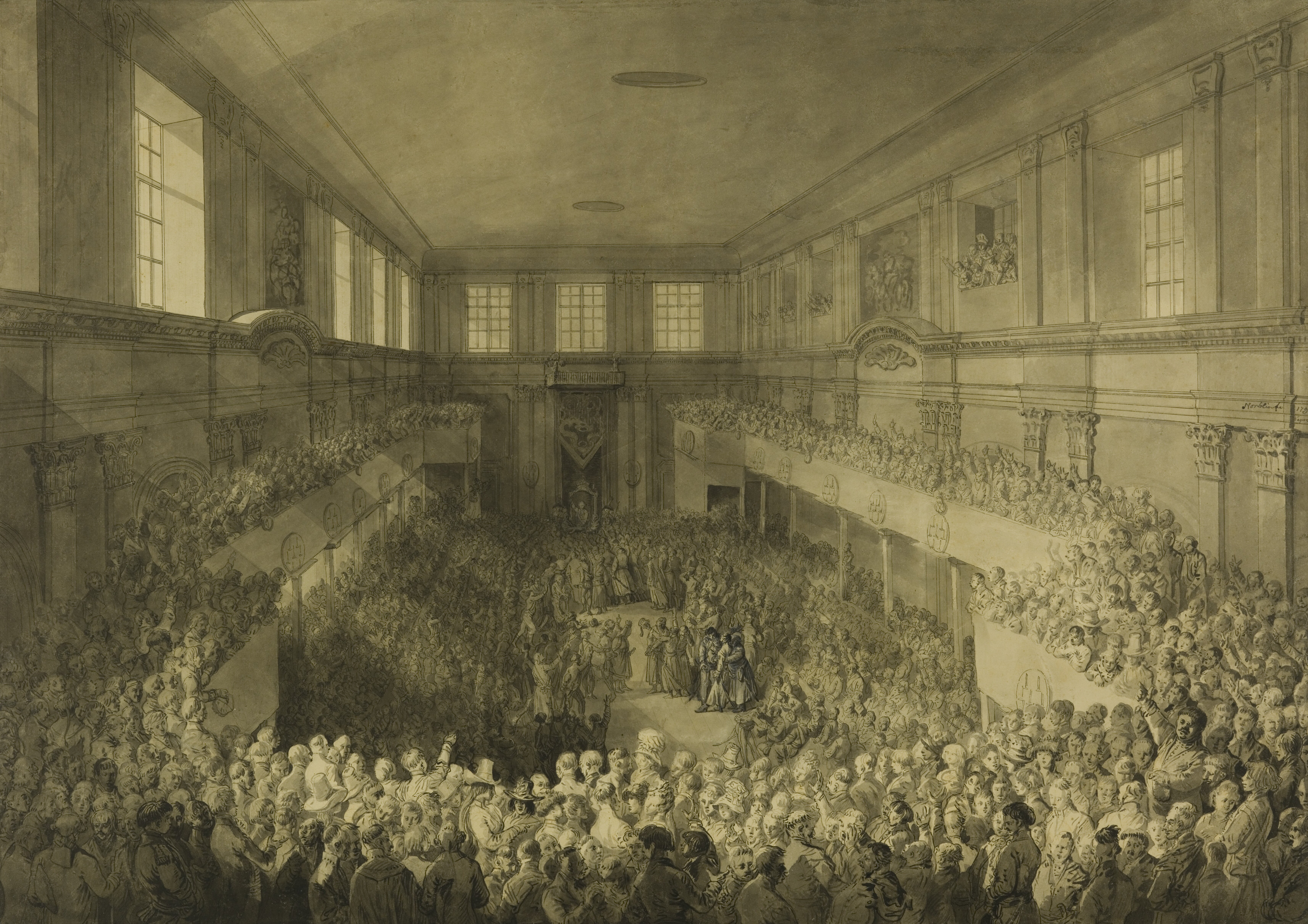
In 1791 the Great or Four-Year Sejm adopted the May 3 Constitution at Warsaw's Royal Castle. Drawing by Jean-Pierre Norblin.

Negotiations with Prussia continued under the new envoy Girolamo Lucchesini. The treaty was signed on March 29, 1790, despite the unresolved disagreements over Danzig and Thorn, which Prussia demanded but the Sejm would not give up. Prussia, however, soon lost interest in the alliance, because of the changing international situation, including a withdrawal of the Austrian threat to the Ottoman Empire. To Prussian politicians, cooperation with Russia appeared again to be their best bet for further territorial acquisitions at the expense of the Polish neighbor.

The "patriots" in the Sejm went ahead with the reform plans nevertheless. The Deputation for the Betterment of the Form of the Government was appointed in 1789 to hasten the preparations. The King now joined the patriotic camp and participated. The Sejm was not dissolved upon the expiration of its two-year term, but election was held in fall of 1790 to complement the body of deputies. The projected reforms had generally gained popularity and support in the sejmiks where the selection took place and nearly two-thirds of the new deputies became participants in the reform process, which appeared to enjoy broad support in various segments of society.

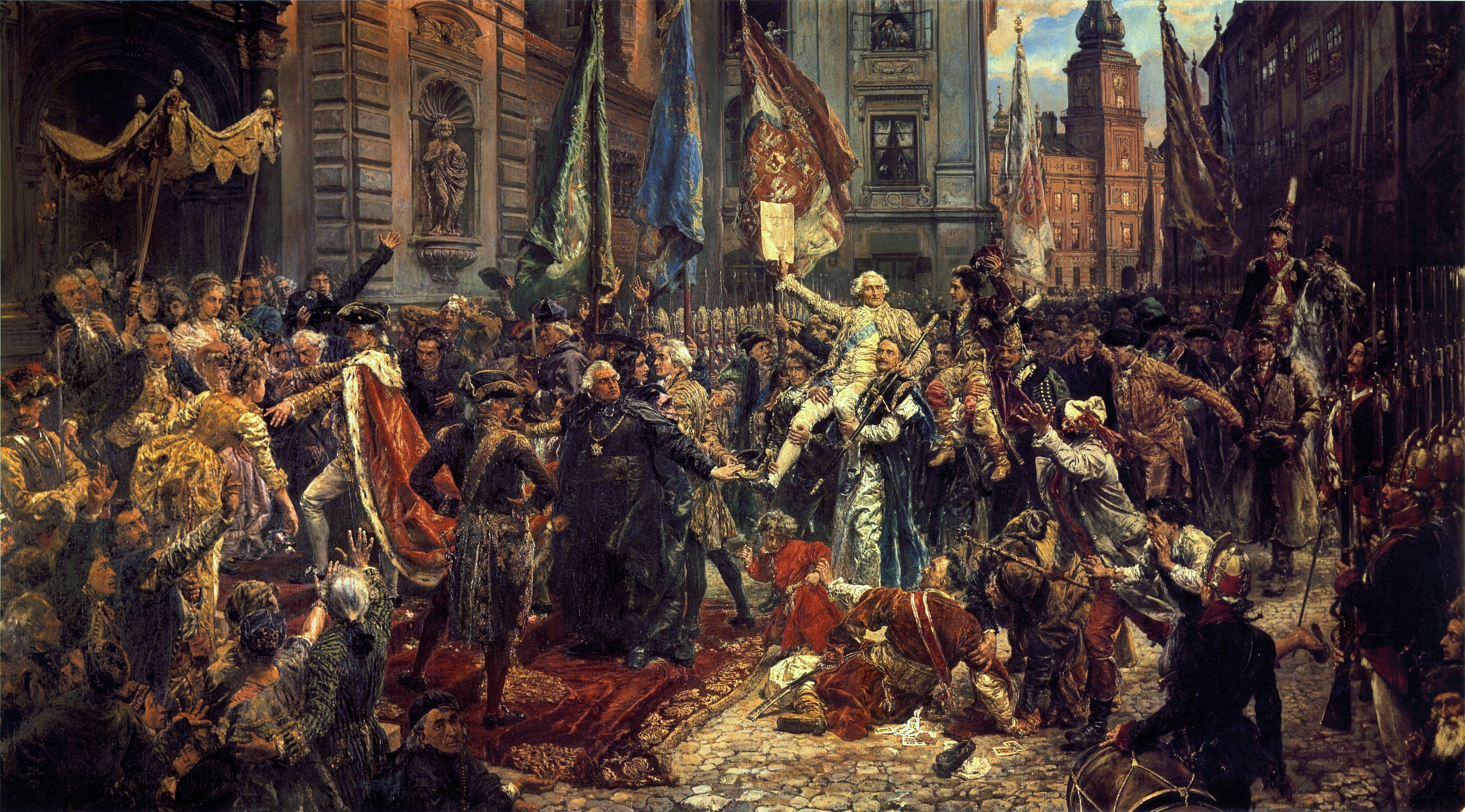
The National Constitution adopted and about to be sworn at St. John's Cathedral. Painting by Jan Matejko.

Sejmiks themselves were reformed first. Only propertied szlachta could vote there from now, which deprived the magnates of much of their traditional clientele, but also violated the formal equality of nobles. Of great importance was the Free Royal Cities Act, passed on April 21, 1791, which satisfied the demands of the Black Procession. Townspeople gained personal legal inviolability, access to offices and distinctions, right to acquire rural land, independent self-government and limited representation in the sejm. Acquiring the noble status was made easier for burghers, while szlachta members would be allowed to practice trade and crafts in cities or hold offices there. Private towns were not included in the reform and full equality of the two estates was not realized, but the breakthrough legislation accomplished indisputable fundamental progress in political, social and economic relations. Considerable part of the conservative opposition no longer participated in the sejm debate and the statutes were passed without much resistance.

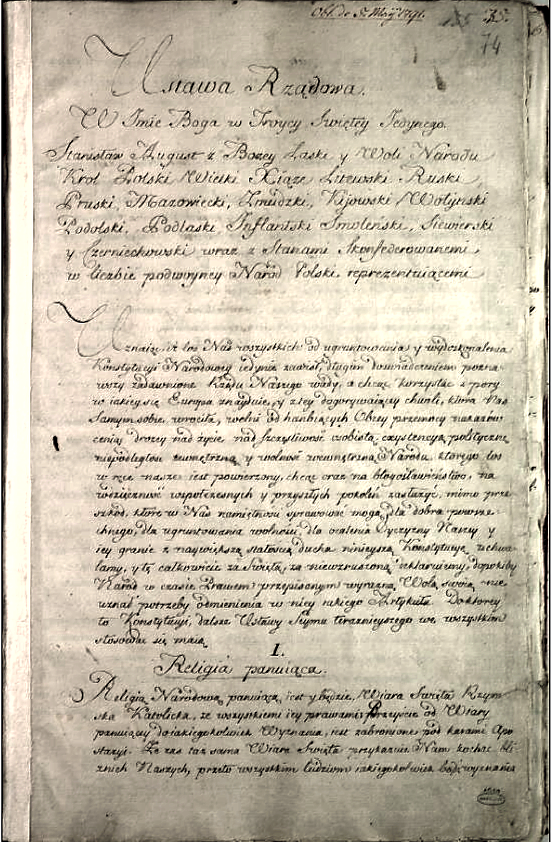
Original manuscript of the Constitution

The most fundamental reform of the system was carried out by the patriots and the King on May 3, 1791, in a manner reminiscent of a coup d'état. The substance of the main government statute, in preparation for some time, was known only to a limited number of deputies. It was written mainly by Stanislaw August, Scipione Piattoli, Ignacy Potocki and Hugo Kołłątaj. Contrary to the parliamentary rules, the general sejm assembly was not familiarized with the proposal in advance and the legislation was rushed through before many deputies had a chance to arrive (only about a third were present). The session took place under pressure form numerous Warsaw residents gathered and reading of alarmist reports from abroad, with the King declaring the necessity of the law's immediate acceptance. Deputy Jan Suchorzewski dramatically protested, but then the Constitution was accepted and sworn amongst the celebrating crowd. The next day a protest was submitted by a small group of deputies, but on May 5 the matter was officially concluded and protests invalidated by the Constitutional Deputation of the Sejm. The entire affair was conducted, for the first time in the 18th century, without presence of foreign military forces or foreign pressures applied.

The principal document produced was entitled the Government Statue (Ustawa Rządowa). It has since been often referred to as the second oldest constitution of this type, after the United States Constitution. It referred to the country's "citizens", which for the first time in Polish legislation was meant to include also townspeople and peasants, not just nobles. Nobility remained the privileged class, but the privilege was now practically limited to those with land property.^{[b]} Their power over peasants became somewhat reduced, in that peasants were declared to be under the protection of the law and the government. New settlers arriving from abroad would enjoy personal freedom and landlords were encouraged to enter into contractual agreements with their rural tenants, which would specify obligations. The state had become involved and through enforcement of contracts able to intervene in the lord-serf relationship.

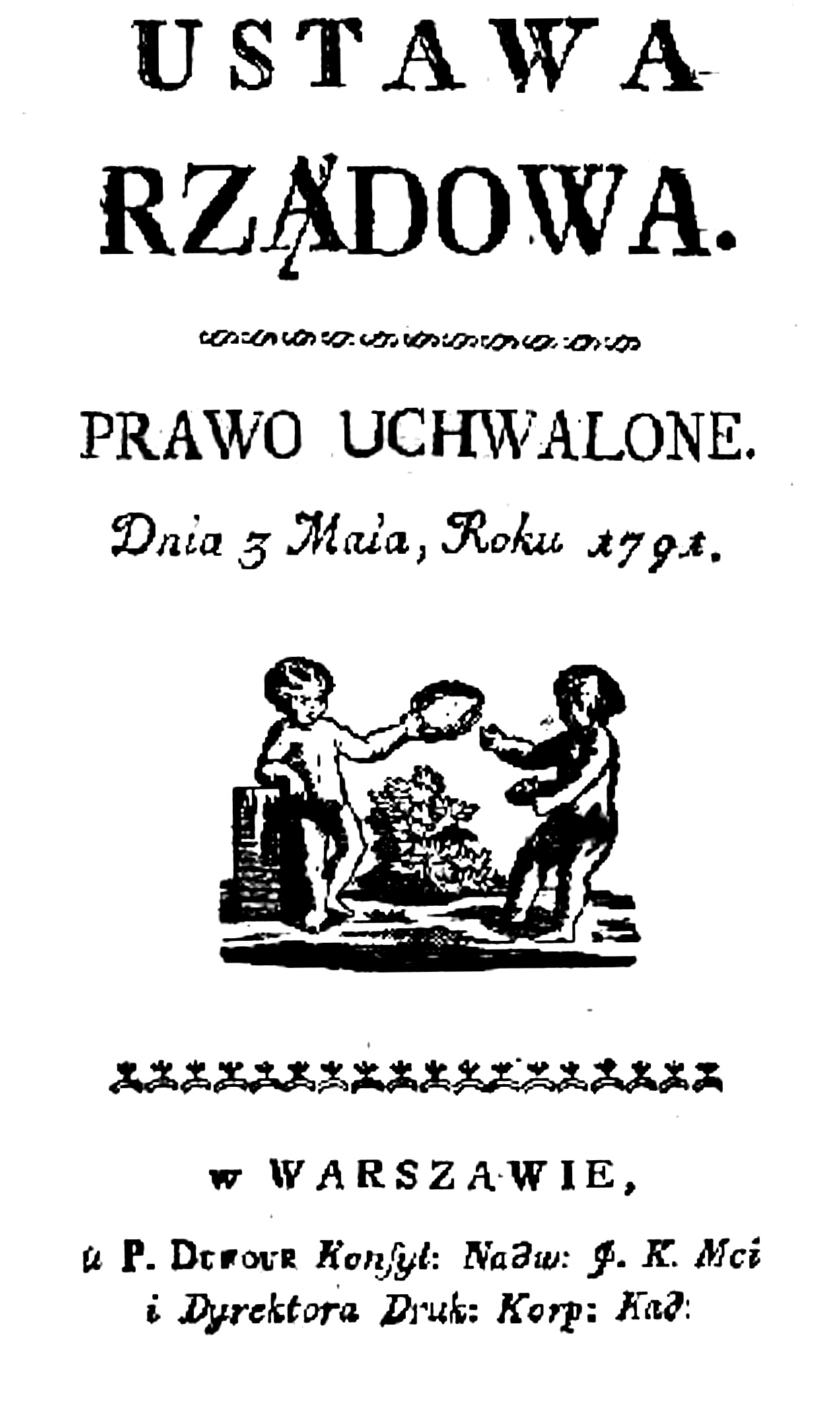
1791 printed edition

Government reform included further unification of the Crown of Poland and the Grand Duchy of Lithuania. Separate central institutions were eliminated, a common military and treasury instituted, but legal distinctions were preserved and Lithuanian nobility would fill half of the offices provided by the branches of central government. Montesquieu separation of powers ideas were taken into account and realized to the degree deemed practical in the Commonwealth. The reformed, nobility-dominated sejm had remained the principal organ of power. Within its each two-year term it had to be ready to assemble, if summoned by the king or the sejm marshal. Decisions would be arrived at by majority voting, liberum veto, confederations and confederated sejms were being eliminated. The senate privileges were reduced to a suspending (temporary) veto of the legislation enacted by the main (lower) chamber. The king stopped being the "third estate" of the sejm. Besides its principal function of legislating and setting taxation policies the sejm had a supervisory role in respect to other organs of power. Sejmiks, in their relation with the sejm, had become advisory assemblies and could not bind their delegates (sejm deputies) to any specific course of action. A special constitutional sejm was to convene every 25 years and be uniquely empowered to alter the fundamental laws contained in the "National Constitution".^{[a]}

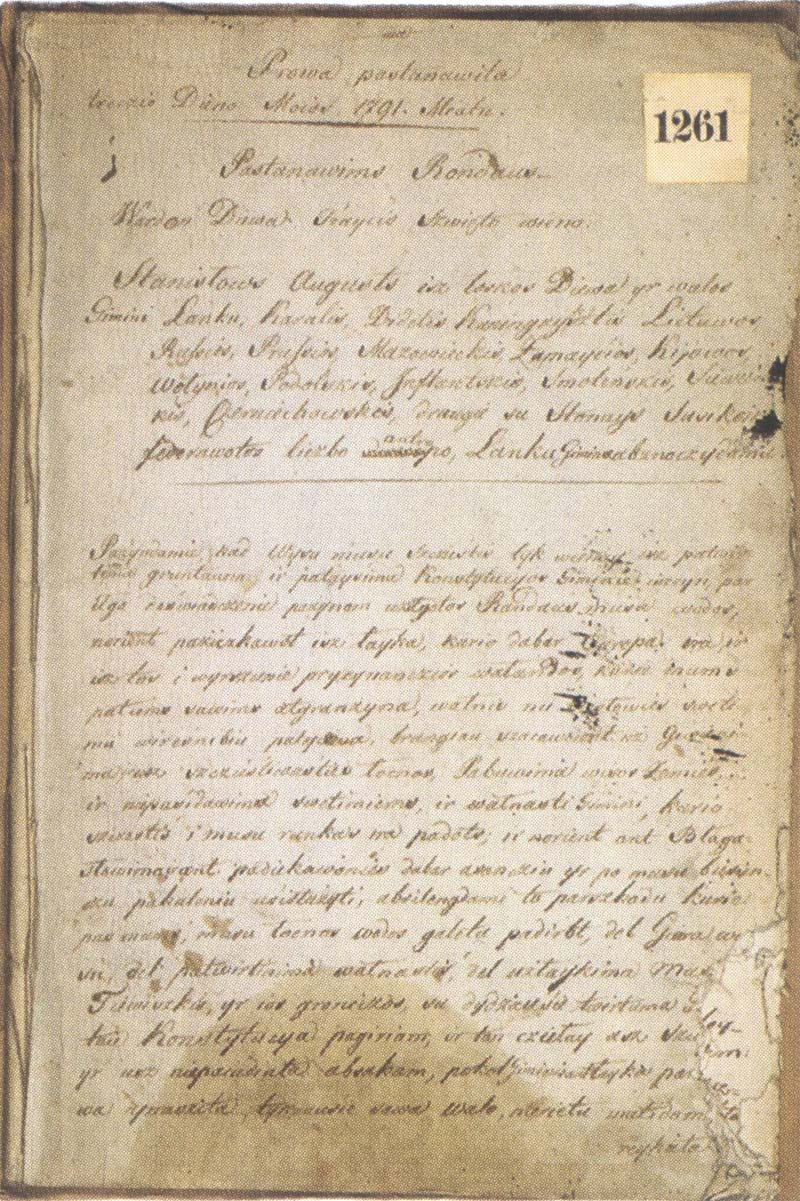
Manuscript of the 1791 Lithuanian translation

After over two centuries of rule by elected kings, the new constitutional monarchy was to become hereditary again. After Stanisław August's death, the Wettin Saxon electoral line would assume the throne. The Henrician Articles would no longer bind the monarch or give the szlachta an excuse for rebellions. Government ministers were answerable before the sejm and were members of the new central governmental organ, the Guardians of the Laws (Straż Praw). This new council consisted of the king as its presiding officer, the primate, five ministers (of police, internal affairs, foreign interests, war and treasury), and also, with an advisory vote only, the marshal of the sejm and the heir to the throne. Ministers would be nominated by the king during a sejm session; the sejm could remove them through a no confidence vote. The Guardians would supervise all other offices, but in cooperation with sejm committees elected by the parliament (collective ministries, including the committees of police, military, treasury and national education). The provincial civil-military commissions would continue to function. Courts were reformed and established as mainly collegial organs.

The Government Statute was influenced by Western thinkers, especially Montesquieu and Rousseau, and the British and Americans precedents, but formulated originally and specifically to satisfy the present needs of the Polish–Lithuanian Commonwealth. The "Enlightened Republic" had thus come into existence and could have become an attractive, in central and eastern Europe, model for governmental and social reform, had it been allowed to continue.

== Failed efforts to defend reforms and preserve independence ==
=== War with Russia, Targowica government, Second Partition ===
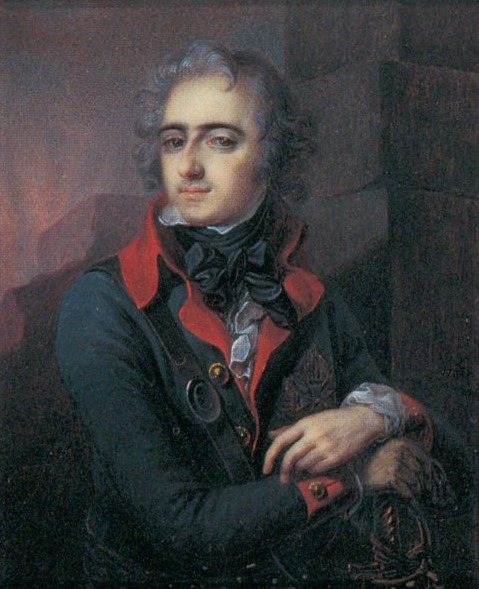
Prince Józef Poniatowski

The adoption of the Constitution was met with a largely positive reaction in the Commonwealth and abroad. It enjoyed the support of a definite majority of the country's middle nobility and townspeople,^{[c]} while many peasants took seriously the promised state protection and became more inclined to reject some of their abusive feudal obligations. Edmund Burke, Thomas Paine and Emmanuel Joseph Sieyès praised the statute, and the reform was supported by the Vienna court of Leopold II.

Adamant in their opposition was the conservative magnate faction led by Szczęsny Potocki, Seweryn Rzewuski and Franciszek Ksawery Branicki. They secured the support of Empress Catherine, who was already worried about the French Revolution spreading to central and eastern Europe, or the Commonwealth practically becoming an ally of revolutionary France. The Empress, done with the Turkish war, intended to eradicate the Polish "revolutionary disease" before moving against France, and Prussia was also interested in preventing a better governed, stronger Commonwealth. Frederick Augustus was persuaded by diplomatic pressure to reject his heir to the Polish throne status.

Branicki, Potocki and Rzewuski prepared in April 1792 in St. Petersburg an act of confederation, annulling the May Constitution and bringing back the Cardinal Laws of 1768. Catherine ordered their confederation constituted at Targowica in Ukraine. The Targowica Confederation then asked the Empire for military help, and on May 18 nearly 100,000 strong Russian armies entered the Commonwealth.

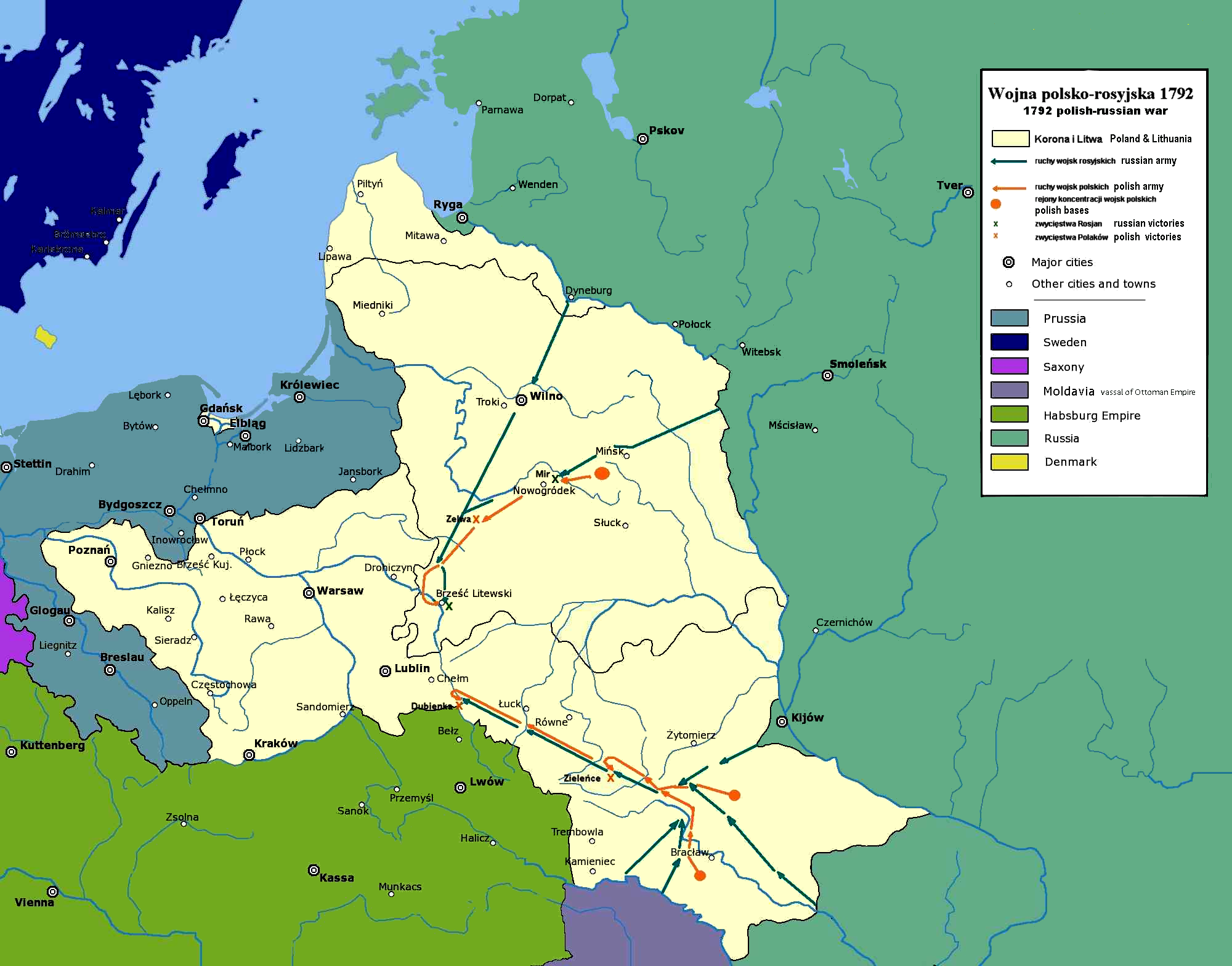
Polish–Russian War of 1792

After the recently undertaken half-measures and partial military reform, there were 57,000 armed soldiers at the King's disposal. Additional recruitment during the war increased their number to 70,000, but the new recruits were neither well-armed nor sufficiently trained. 40,000 ended up facing the Russians at the frontlines, the rest being kept away in reserve. There were a few able and accomplished in foreign service top commanders, but not enough competent officers of the middle and lower ranks. The Crown army was led by Prince Józef Poniatowski, the King's nephew, the Lithuanian force by Duke Louis of Württemberg. Stanisław August did not believe in the possibility of the Commonwealth prevailing militarily and intended rather an armed demonstration, to improve his negotiating position. The armies were expected to delay the enemy advance and then to protect Warsaw.

Lithuania was lost first, because of the betrayal of Louis of Württemberg, who would not fight the Russians, and the ineptness of the leaders who followed. The unsuccessful Battle of Mir of June 11 effectively ended the campaign there.

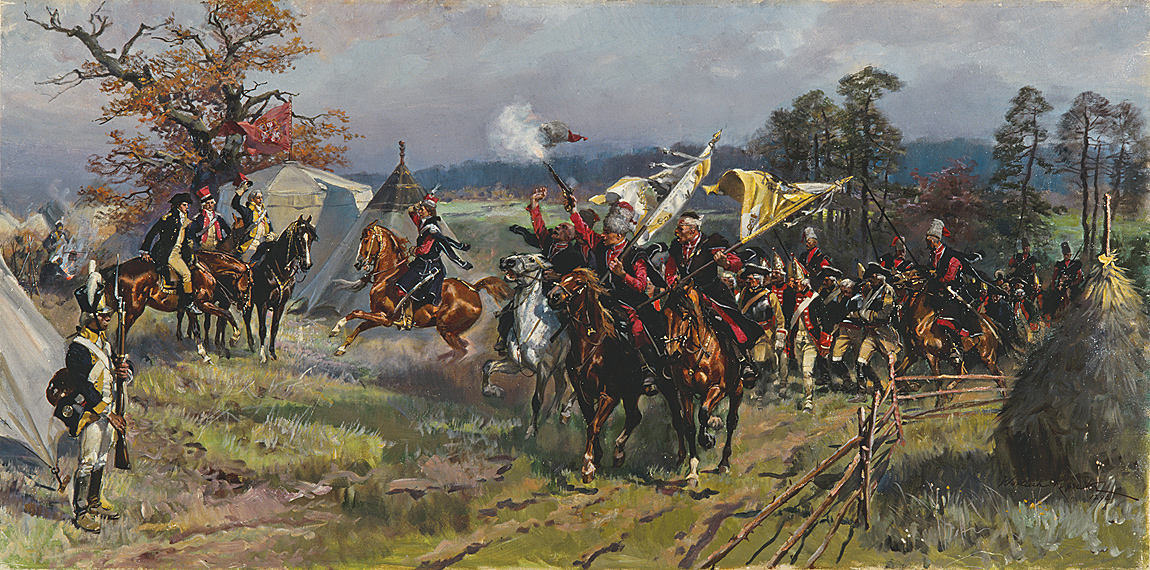
A scene after the Battle of Zieleńce, called by Stanisław August the first victory since John III Sobieski

The badly outnumbered Crown army avoided defeat and retreated in an orderly fashion from their initial positions at the southeastern borderlands to the Bug River. On June 18, Prince Poniatowski led his soldiers to a victory at Zieleńce, which prompted the King to establish the Virtuti Militari decoration for valor. In mid-July, an attempt was made to stabilize defenses at the Bug River line, fiercely defended by Tadeusz Kościuszko at the Battle of Dubienka. Afterwards the army continued its retreat toward the Vistula.

The war was not lost and the young army fought bravely. Prince Poniatowski and his generals recommended nationwide mobilization to stop the Russians and preserve independence. Austria and then Prussia became engaged in warfare against revolutionary France and Russia remained the sole adversary to contend with. The King, however, given an ultimatum by Catherine II, who demanded that he joins the Targowica Confederation, acquiesced on July 24 and ordered immediate cessation of military activity. Poniatowski, Kościuszko and other officers demonstrated protest by resigning their commissions, but the King's capitulation was not vigorously contested by the nobility's "patriotic camp". Subsequently, some patriots left the country, many other followed the King's lead. The work of the Great Sejm had become undone, the Commonwealth found itself under the rule of Empress Catherine and the Targowica alliance.

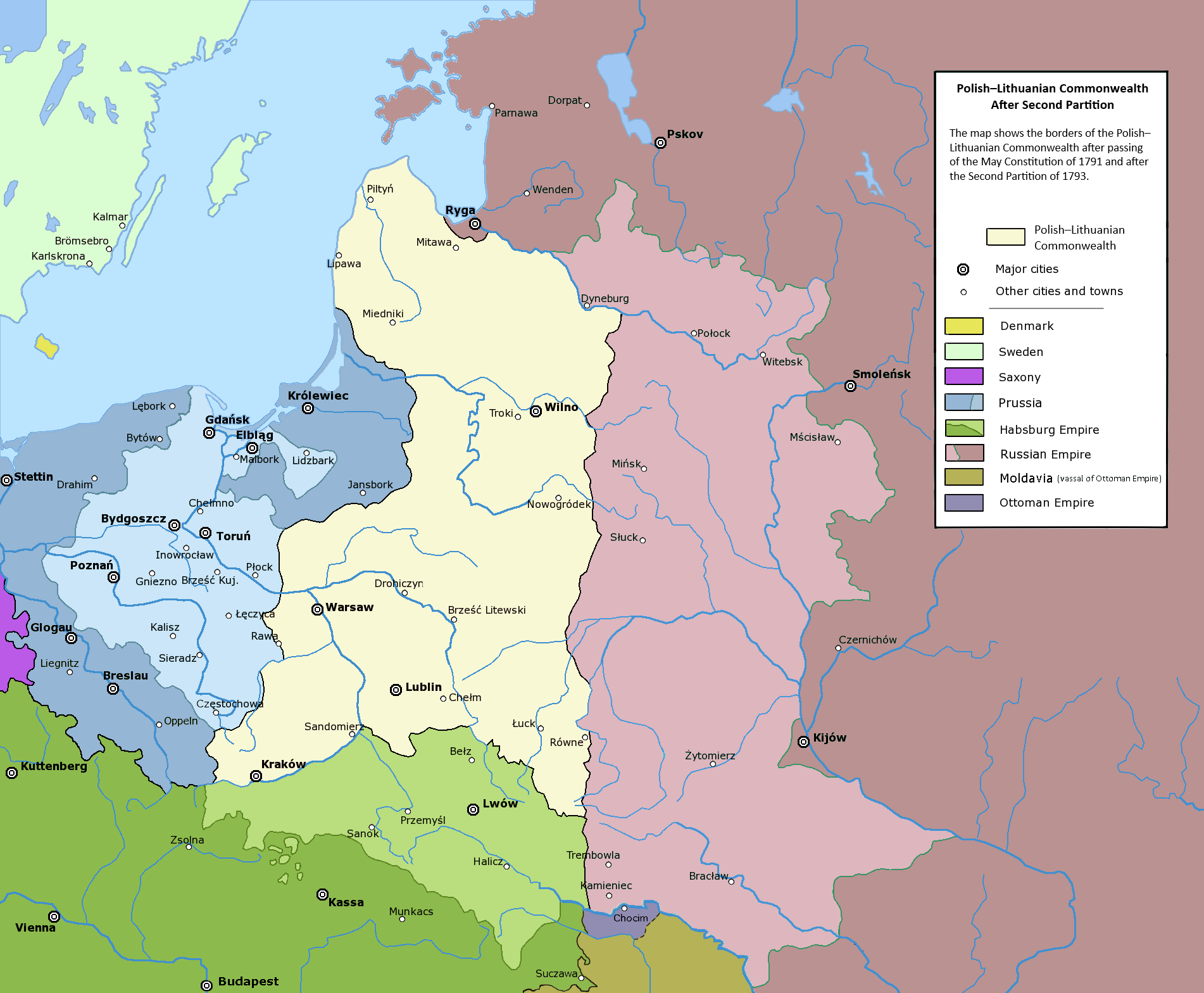
Poland after the Second Partition

The King's hope that his access to Targowica would salvage some of the reforms and protect the state's territorial integrity soon turned out to be illusory. Targowica leaders established a dictatorial government, ignoring the King and his supporters. They undertook a rampant destruction of the many achievements of the Polish Enlightenment and reform era, while the disoriented szlachta proceeded to join the perceived victors in large numbers.

That victory was also an illusion. Prussia, defeated at Valmy by revolutionary France, demanded compensation for its involvement there and the lands of the defenseless Commonwealth appeared available for this purpose. Catherine II's advisers also thought it advantageous to further reduce the Polish state. When the new Emperor Francis II opted out of the deal, expecting instead to gain Bavaria, a new partitioning treaty was signed on January 23, 1793 in St. Petersburg, between Russia and Prussia.

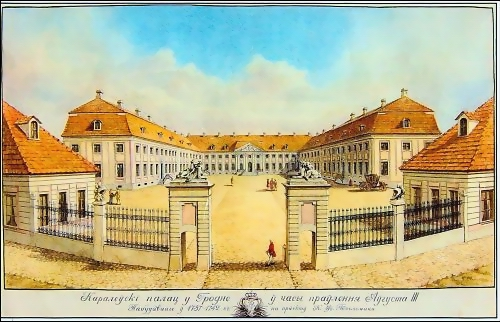
Grodno Sejm took place in a castle surrounded by Russian troops

Prussia received Danzig (Gdańsk) and Thorn (Toruń), together with Greater Poland and western Mazovia, the lands that had never been under German rule before (58,000 km^{2} and over 1 million people). Russia acquired a majority of Belarus, Dnieper Ukraine and Podolia (280,000 km^{2} and 3 million residents). Some Targowica leaders (Szczęsny Potocki, Rzewuski and Branicki) formally protested and for a while left the country; other (Szymon Kossakowski and Józef Kossakowski) stayed to rule the Grand Duchy of Lithuania under the tsarist authority. Danzig and Thorn militarily resisted the Prussian takeover.

The remaining Commonwealth regions reached north to include Courland, but consisted only of the area of 227,000 km^{2} and 4.4 million people; it functioned as a Russian protectorate. The King had to arrange for formalities necessary to legalize the fait accompli. A sejm was summoned to Grodno to do that and to organize the diminished state. The deputies were selected for docility, but energetic protests took place nevertheless. Catherine's new ambassador, Jacob Sievers, responded with military intervention, compulsion and punitive acts. The deputies eventually ratified a cession of lands to Russia, but would not produce an analogous agreement with Prussia, the initiator of the present partition. Sejm Marshal Stanisław Bieliński interpreted their nightlong silence as acquiescence and the treaty with Prussia was also officially proclaimed.

The legal system was brought back to what had been determined after the First Partition, except that majority voting in the sejm was preserved and townspeople kept some of their recently acquired rights. The Cardinal Laws were in force again and the army was limited to 15,000. The Permanent Council was brought back for practical administration of the state, but was now placed under the direction of the Russian ambassador.

=== Kościuszko Uprising and Third Partition ===
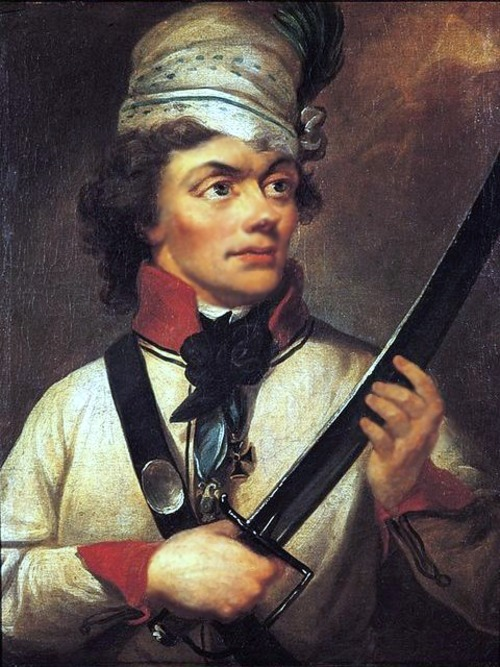
Tadeusz Kościuszko fought for the American colonists and led the Commonwealth's last military undertaking

==== Uprising preparations ====
After the Second Partition, the patriotic, independence-minded forces were left only with the option of organizing a broadly-based national uprising and forming an alliance with the revolutionary forces of Europe.

The Second Partition brought not only political, but also economic disaster. Territorial reductions disrupted the market, undercut the industries and caused a crash of the banking system. The state treasury had become depleted, which caused a chain economic reaction and social unrest. News of social upheavals were reaching from France, but also from Silesia, in 1793 a scene of labor and other unrest.

The planned uprising had to be prepared without prematurely provoking the partitioning powers into preemptive action, but also without waiting too long. There were foreign circles pressuring for a final partition, from late 1793 including Austria, now unhappy with bypassing the previous opportunity to enlarge its territory.

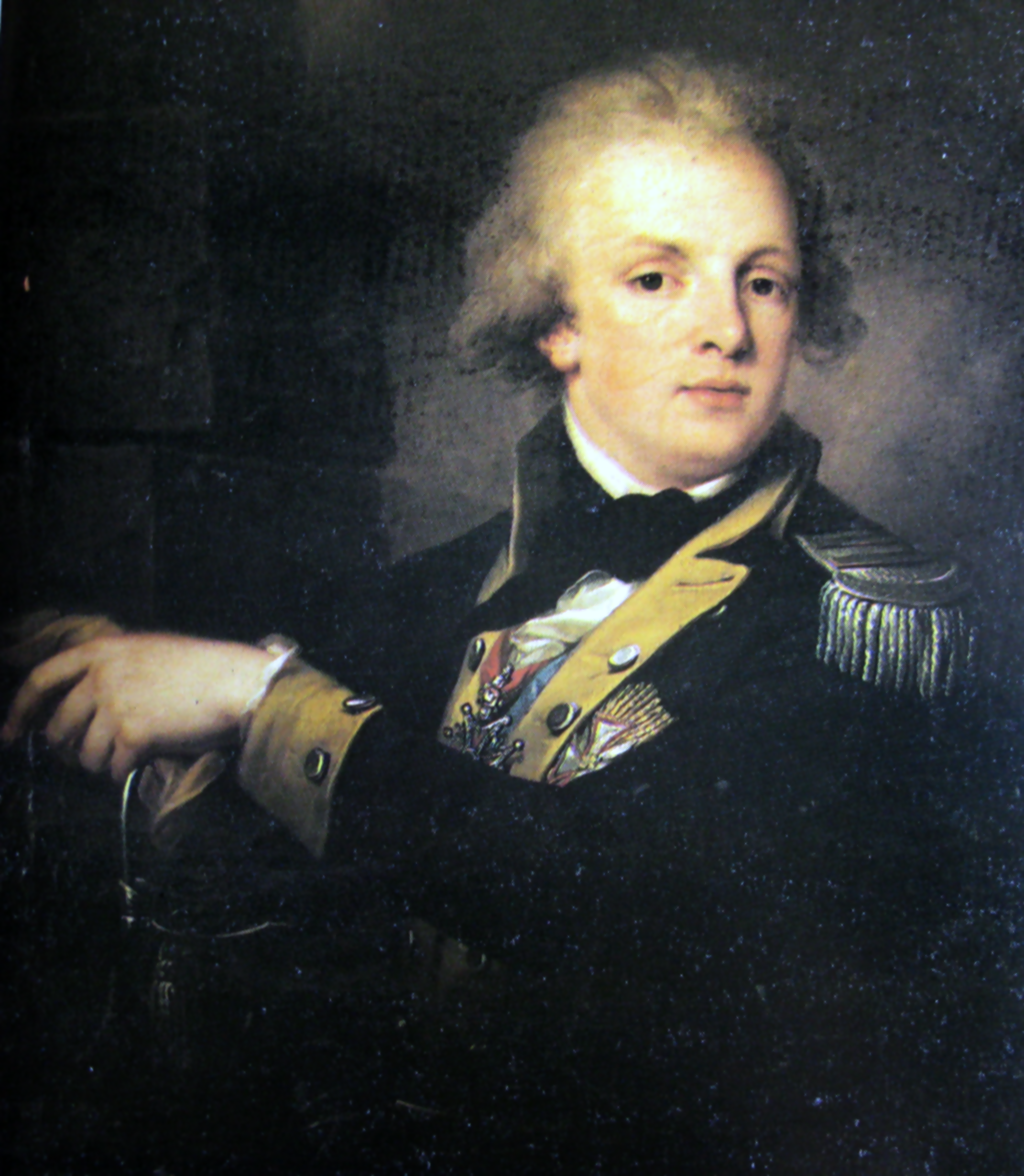
Ignacy Działyński was an organizer and participant of the Kościuszko Insurrection

A radical conspiracy wing, aiming for the broadest popular appeal, led by former activists of Kołłątaj's Forge group, developed within the Commonwealth. Their goals included removal of the King and an establishment of a republic. The moderate elements, led by Ignacy Działyński and Warsaw banker Andrzej Kapostas, favored a carefully prepared uprising based on the existing military. Their goal was to reinstate the May 3 Constitution.

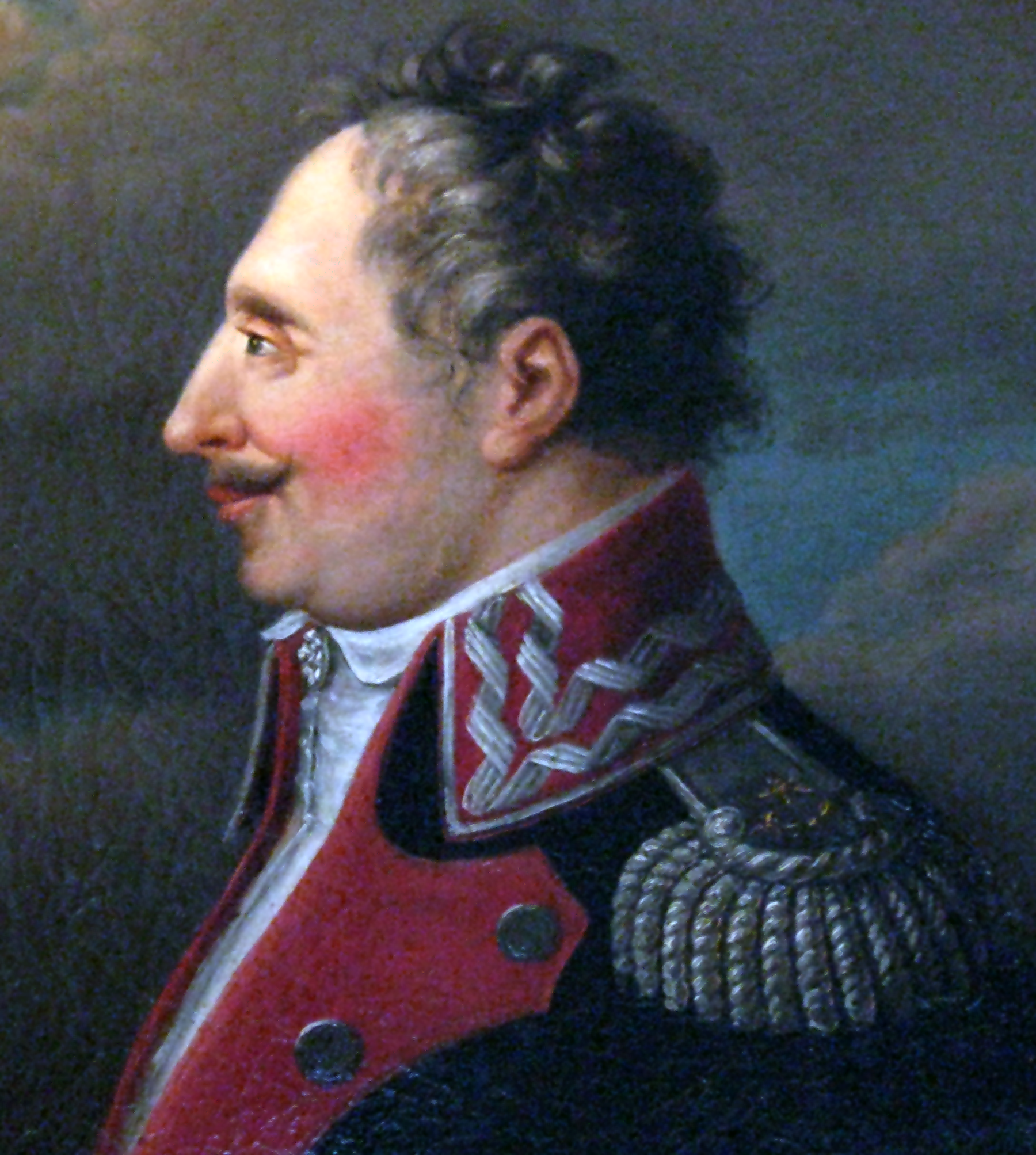
Brigadier Antoni Madaliński made the first move

Leaders who left the country were likewise divided. Hugo Kołłątaj, aided by Franciszek Dmochowski and Ignacy Potocki, published in Dresden On the establishment and fall of the May 3 Constitution, in which they blamed the King, preparing the ground for his overthrow. The dominant emigrant radical faction hoped for quick social reforms to engage broad masses in a national insurrection; they also counted on foreign assistance, especially from revolutionary France.

The international situation had not been developing favorably, though. The Girondists and then the Jacobins were involved in diplomatic maneuvering, trying to get Prussia out of the war with France. Tadeusz Kościuszko, expected to be the leader of the planned uprising, tried to obtain promises of aid, but was not given any specific assurances during his stay in Paris in early 1793. Already during the uprising, its representative in Paris, Franciszek Barss, was also denied help.

General Kościuszko attended the Polish reformist Corps of Cadets, studied military engineering in Paris and had behind him already distinguished service record from the American Revolutionary War and the recent Polish war with Russia. His intention was to utilize his American experience, combine military operations by a regular army with those of informal and irregular popular forces, based on peasant and urban masses, hoping to substitute their great numbers and motivation for the inevitable deficiencies in equipment and training.

==== Early insurgency and first successes ====
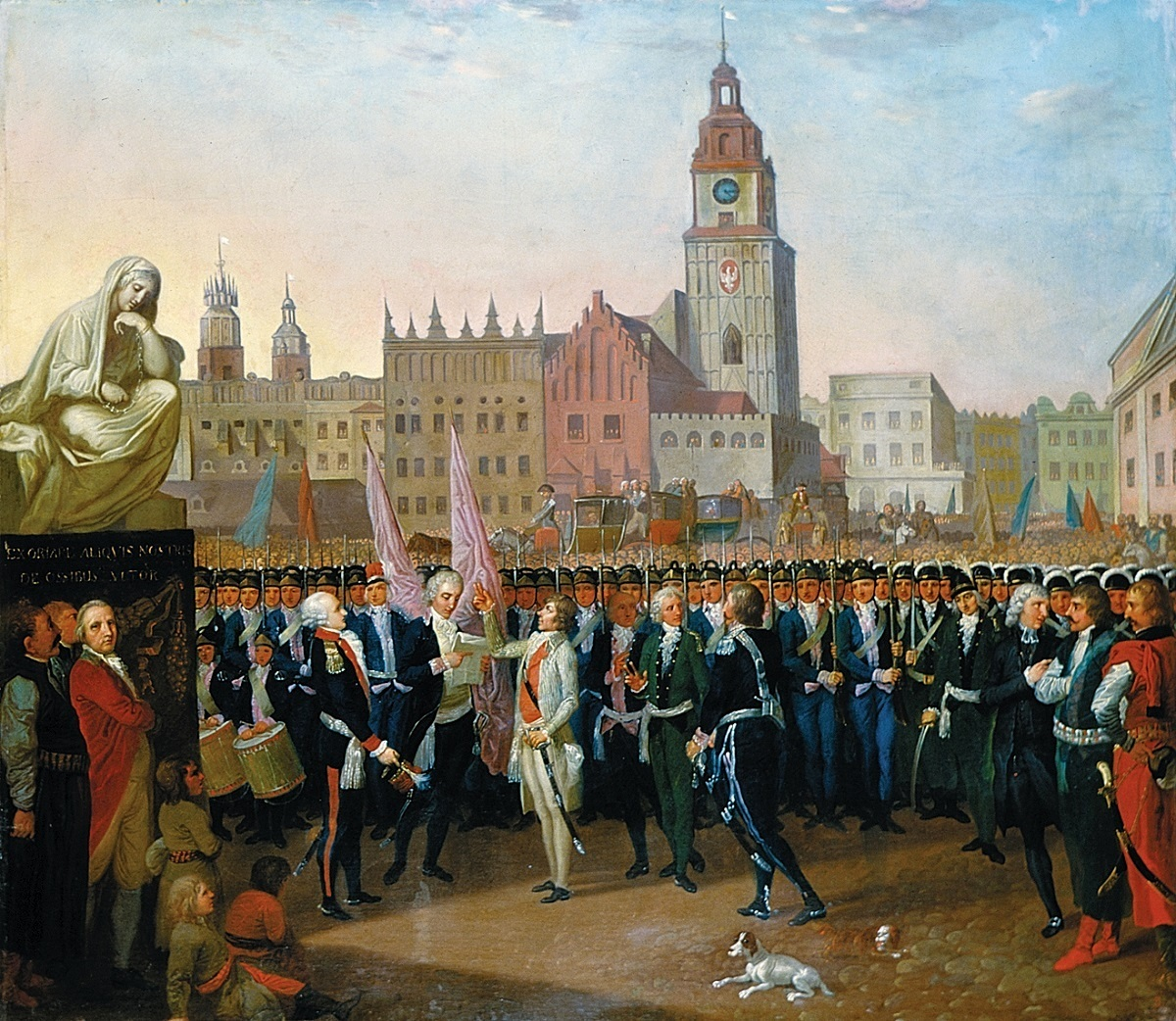
Kościuszko Uprising officially began with Tadeusz Kościuszko taking oath, Kraków 1794

During advanced preparations, the uprising conspiracy was uncovered in Warsaw by the Russian ambassador Iosif Igelström, who arrested activists and moved to accelerate the reduction of the Commonwealth armed forces, already ordered by the Grodno Sejm. Some Polish forces were being disbanded, other incorporated into the Russian army. Brigadier Antoni Madaliński, stationed in Ostrołęka in Mazovia, refused to cooperate and went with his unit toward Kraków, seeking to join Kościuszko, who was already present in the area. Igelström ordered a pursuit, but also evacuated Kraków, to concentrate the Russian forces in Warsaw area. Kościuszko arrived in Kraków and on March 24, 1794, officially declared in the main town square the act of the uprising.

Tadeusz Kościuszko assumed dictatorial powers, obliging himself to use it to regain national self-sufficiency, defend the country's borders and promote general freedom, deferring systemic reform to a more opportune time. His chief goal was the military fight in the name of "freedom, territorial integrity and independence". All men age 18 to 28 were urged to join the insurgent army and towns and villages were to be provided with arms for self-defense. Four thousand soldiers and two thousand kosynierzy (peasant fighters armed with scythes) were gathered within a week.

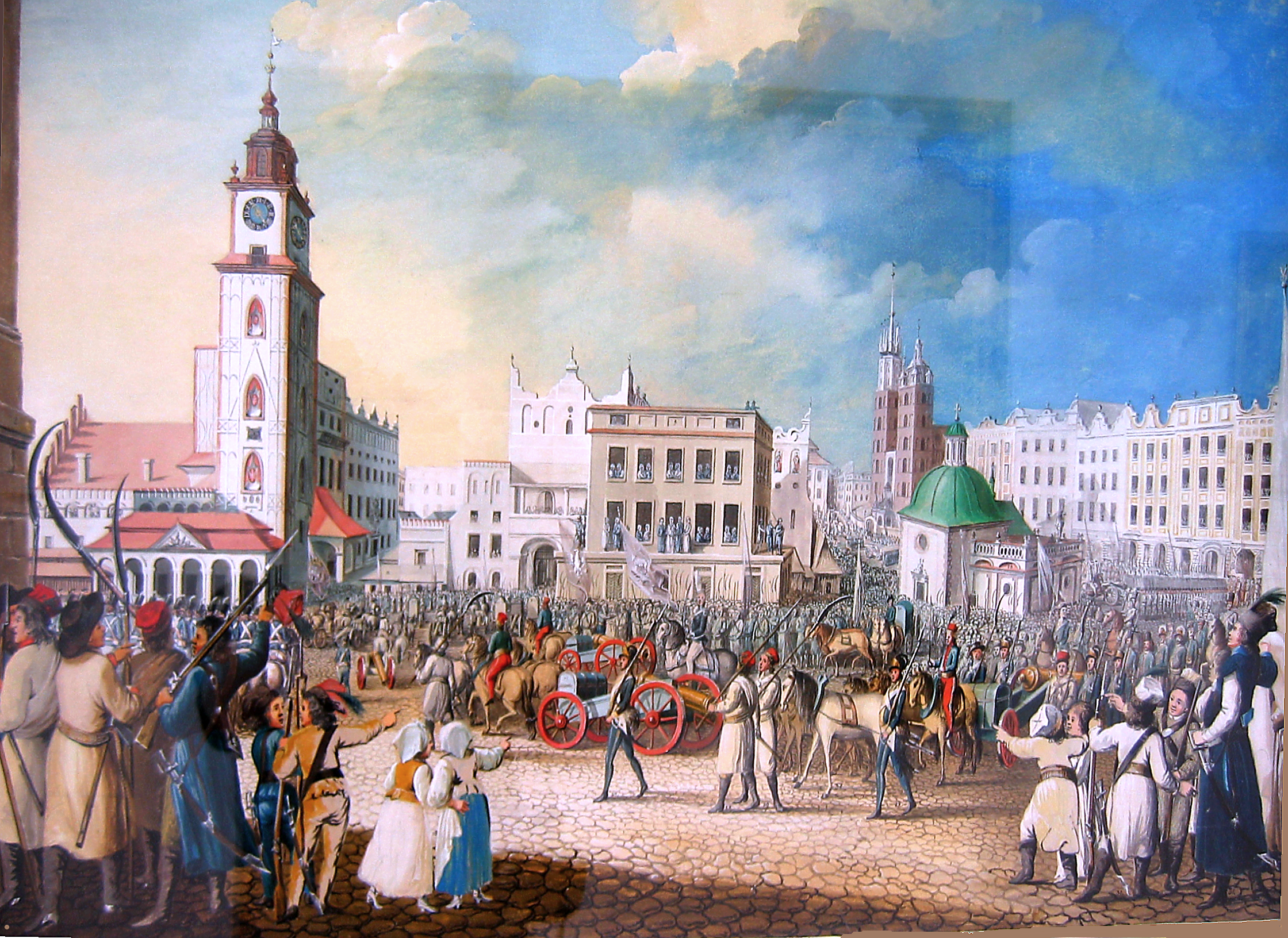
Russian cannons captured at the Battle of Racławice are brought to Kraków

Kościuszko attempted to relocate his formation to Warsaw, but was blocked by a strong Russian force led by General Fiodor Denisov. Attempting to circumvent that army, Kościuszko encountered a separate smaller Russian corps under General Alexander Tormasov. The Battle of Racławice that ensued was won with a daring charge by the kosynierzy; it failed to open the route to Warsaw, but lifted the spirit of the insurgents and a Polish legend was born. In the context of general military mobilization, the commander demonstrated his support for the peasants and became a symbol of their cause (and of national unity across the class spectrum).

In the meantime, the uprising had been spreading in other regions as well. A division stationed in Lublin area and Volhynia joined in late March and an insurrection took place in Warsaw on April 17. As the Russian authorities attempted to disarm the Polish garrison there, heavy fighting erupted with the participation of the people of Warsaw led by Jan Kiliński, a shoemaker. The Russian garrison was largely destroyed and Ambassador Igelström barely managed to leave the city with the remnants of his force, finding refuge among the Prussian units stationed outside of the capital. With the victory in Warsaw, the military balance had been altered and the uprising expanded to Mazovia and Podlasie.

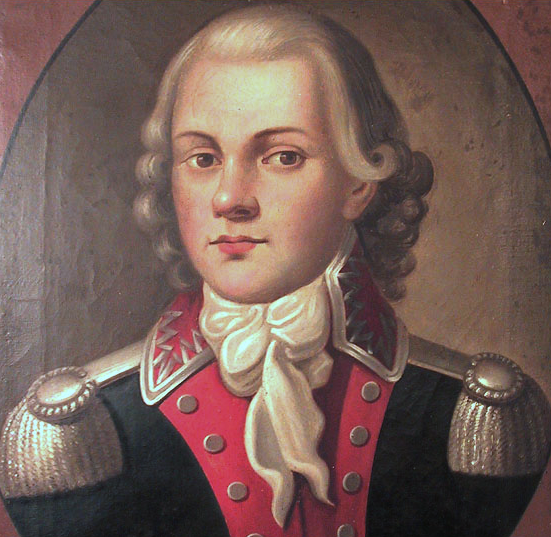
Jakub Jasiński, a "Jacobin" leader, was killed defending Praga

The Grand Duchy of Lithuania responded in parallel with the Warsaw events, from April 16. The fighting in Vilnius (Wilno) began on April 23 and there also the Russian units were broken with popular participation. The Lithuanian Highest Council was established in Vilnius and chose Jakub Jasiński, a Jacobin and successful commander of the military assault, as the leader of the insurrection in Lithuania. Targowica participants were dealt with severely: Hetman Szymon Kossakowski was tried and executed.

Kościuszko was still in Kraków region, unable to leave because of the Denisov army. On May 5, he fortified himself at a camp near Połaniec, seeking rescue operations from the directions of Warsaw and Lublin. Denisov attacked Połaniec, but threatened with encirclement withdrew on May 17 toward Silesia. Kościuszko was able to communicate with Warsaw and exert more influence on the events there.

==== Social basis and organization of insurgent forces ====
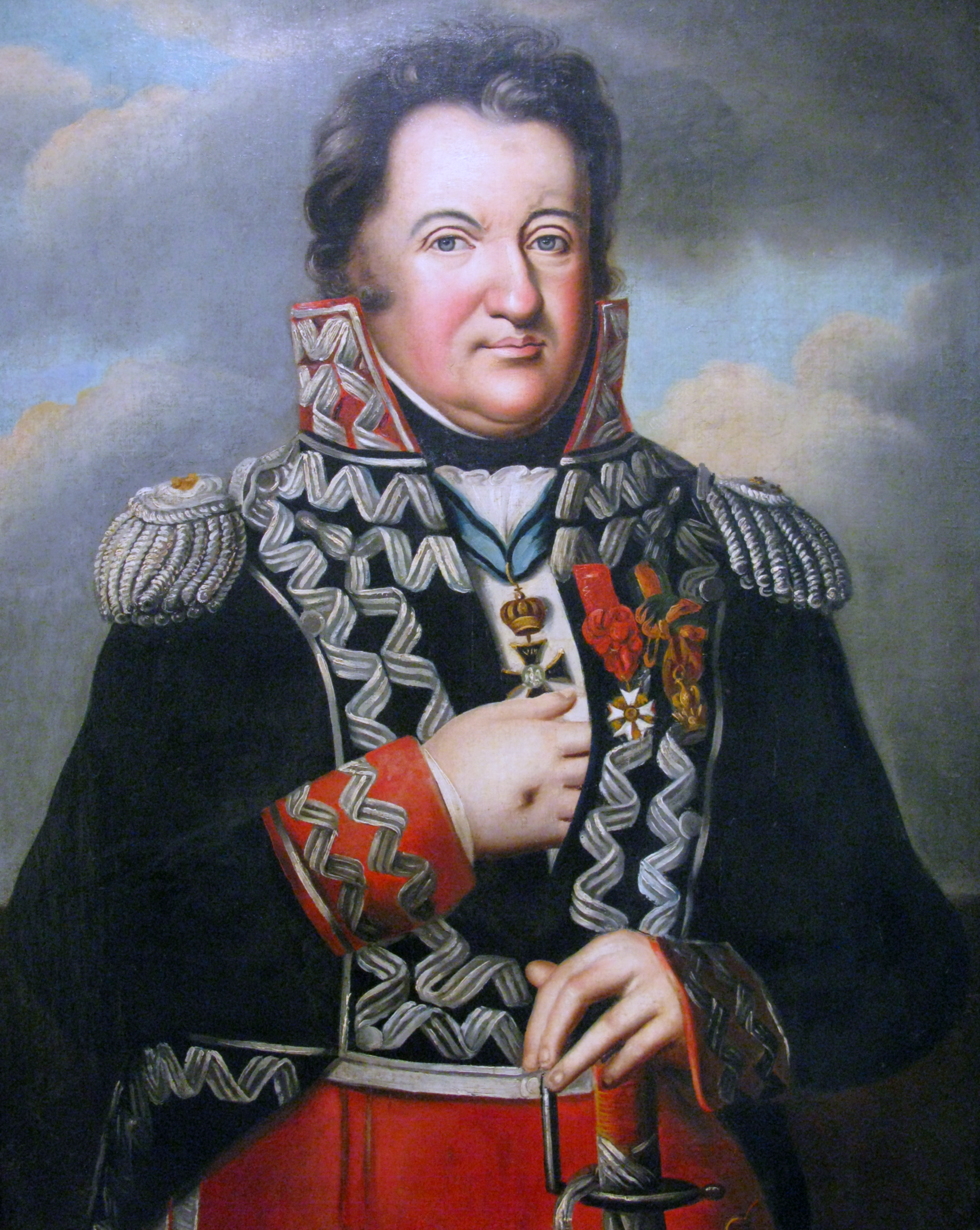
Jan Henryk Dąbrowski

The leaders of the uprising had to secure the broadest possible social support for their military undertaking, without alienating the crucially important nobility establishment. The compromise steps taken failed to satisfy any of the factions involved. The Proclamation of Połaniec, issued by Kościuszko on May 7, regulated serfdom obligations and governmental protection for peasant laborers. They were granted personal freedom of movement or relocation, could not be forcefully removed from the land they tended and their amount of compulsory labor was substantially reduced. The reform amounted to a significant improvement in the situation of peasants, but its implementation depended largely on good will of szlachta landlords, who often boycotted its provisions. The contribution of kosynierzy units was very substantial nevertheless. Six thousand participated, for example, in the Battle of Szczekociny and as many as eight hundred peasant formations are estimated to have fought during the entire uprising. The slogan "they feed and defend" promoted the peasant cause.

Among the szlachta many remained suspicious about the social aspects of the uprising. Warsaw became the scene of an acute confrontation between the conservative and the revolutionary elements. The Provisional Council was formed there by moderates and people connected to the royal court, but they soon encountered stiff opposition from Warsaw masses directed by the Jacobin Club, established on April 24 for the ostensible purpose of strictly adhering to the "undertaking of Kościuszko". The Club's radicals favored a popular revolution and ruthless reckoning with individuals they regarded as traitors; the "Jacobins" formulated a far-reaching program of social and political reform. Disturbances took place on May 9 and the Criminal Court was pressured to sentence four magnates–Targowica participants, including Bishop Józef Kossakowski, to death.

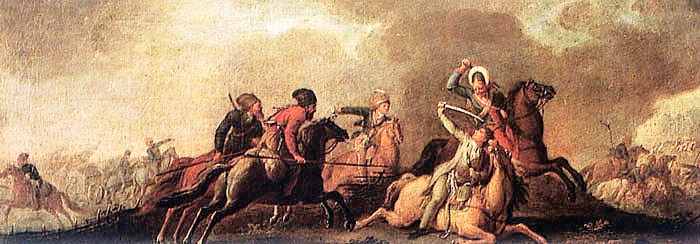
Kościuszko wounded at Maciejowice

At the end of May Kościuszko replaced the Provisional Council with the new Supreme National Council, which also included representatives of the left. Hugo Kołłątaj led the Treasury Department, Franciszek Dmochowski took over schooling and propaganda. Revolutionary pamphlets were widely propagated. Kołłątaj instituted the long-overdue fiscal measures and the Commonwealth's goal of forming a hundred thousand men military finally became a reality. The regular army reached no more than 55,000 though; the rest was made up of various auxiliary and voluntary formations, pospolite ruszenie (general conscription) and urban militia, often poorly armed and trained. Efforts to develop an armament industry were only partially successful, but the motivation of the insurgents was generally expected to make up for their insufficient equipment and preparation. Kościuszko's non-traditional strategy of intensive military activity and constant, rapid attacks, aimed at enemy harassment and forcing hand-to-hand combat, sometimes exceeded the abilities of the forces at his disposal.

==== Struggle for Warsaw and defeat of the Uprising ====
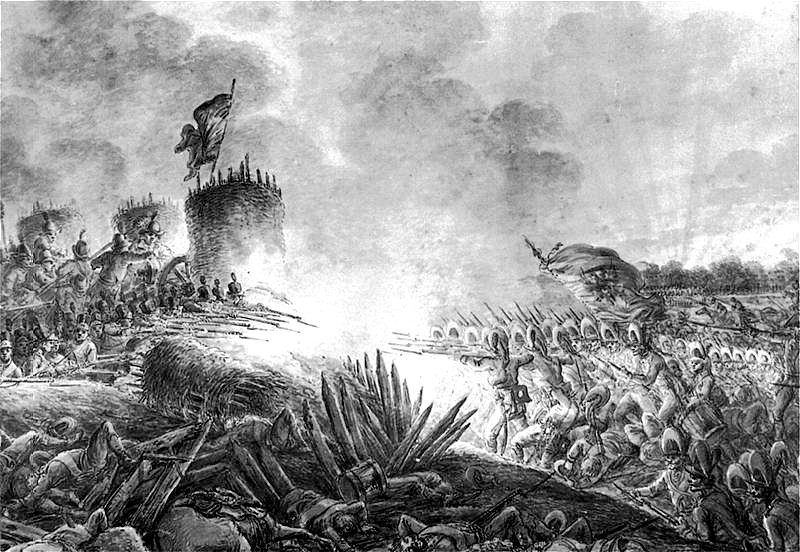
Warsaw's last defense, November 4, 1794

As the Russians struggled to regain control and bring reinforcements, the insurgents were surprised by a Prussian intervention. Kościuszko, strengthened by units from the Lublin province, had 15,000 men and unsuccessfully tried to destroy the Denisov force before it could unite with the Prussian army. He then decided to face the stronger combined enemy at the Battle of Szczekociny, fought on June 6. The Poles were defeated and forced to retreat. The peasant hero of the Racławice battle, Wojciech Bartosz Głowacki, fell at Szczekociny. As a consequence of the military loss, Kraków surrendered and was taken over by the Prussians. General Józef Zajączek was also defeated at Chełm on June 8, as he tried to stop a Russian corps advancing from Volhynia. The insurgent armies were withdrawing toward Warsaw.

Alarmed by the developments, the radical elements in Warsaw reached for power. As the Jacobins demanded forceful action from the Supreme Council, the mob broke into the prisons; suspected traitors were hanged without trials and the King was threatened. Kościuszko's reaction was negative; the leaders of the riot were dealt with severely and the attempt by the left ended up with an inconclusive outcome.

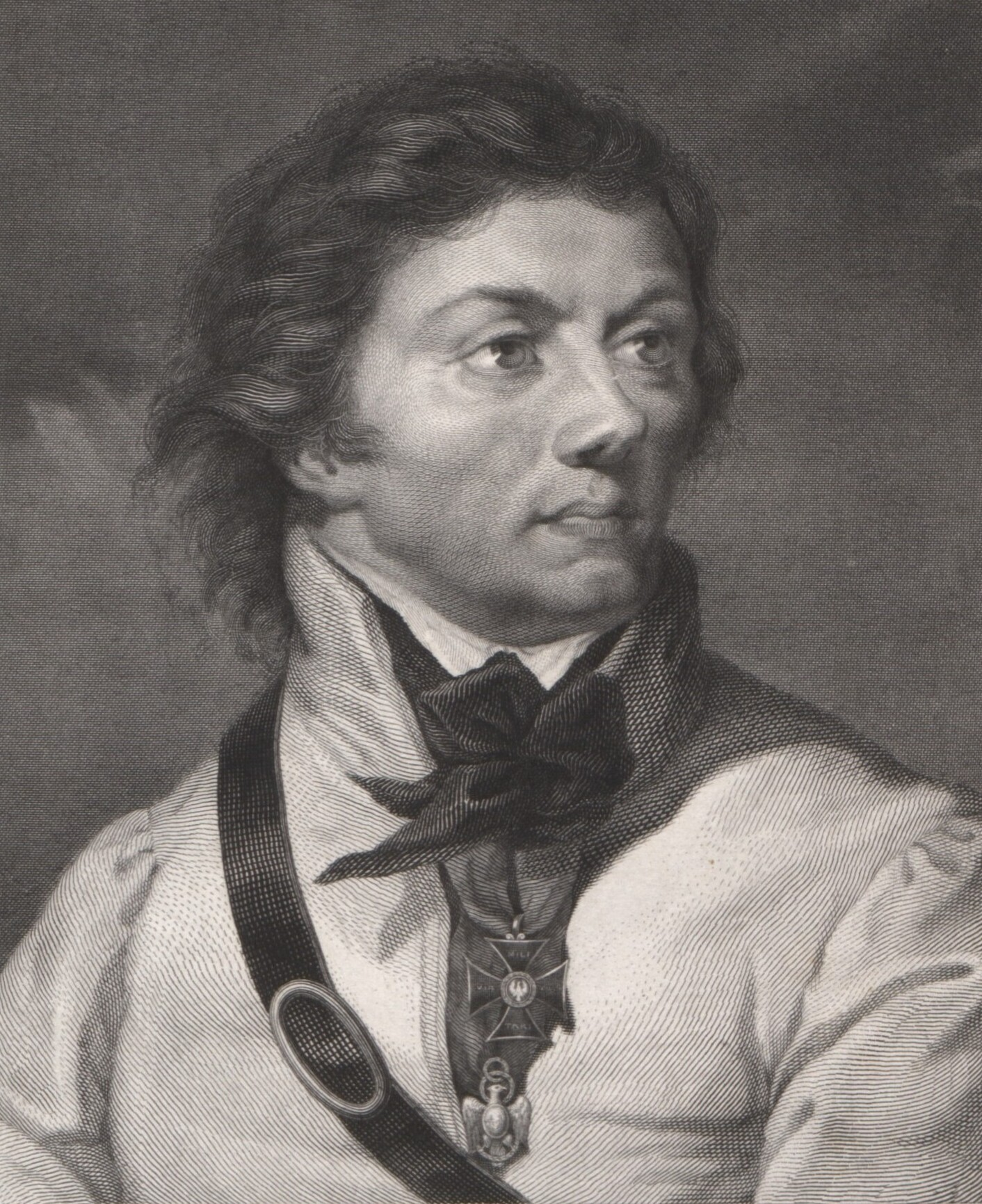
Tadeusz Kościuszko has remained an iconic figure in Polish history

Facing the Prussian and Russian armies approaching the capital, Kościuszko led the efforts to shore up the defenses and actively involve Warsaw's population. The siege of the city and attendant military skirmishes took place in July and August. From August 20, the insurrection reached the Prussian Partition, engulfing Greater Poland, up to parts of Pomerania and Silesia. Consequently, Frederick II of Prussia, ready to storm Warsaw, withdrew on September 6 toward the Bzura River and the Russians lifted the siege as well. Jan Henryk Dąbrowski led a corps dispatched to support the Greater Poland uprising and took Bydgoszcz, before having to return to the Bzura area, where a division commanded by Józef Poniatowski also fought the Prussians.

In the east the situation developed less favorably for the insurgents. In June, the uprising included the fighting in Courland and Lipawa (Liepāja) was taken, but the Russians soon undertook an offensive aimed at Vilnius. The Lithuanian capital capitulated on August 12. The army of Alexander Suvorov, stationed in Ukraine, became free to act because of the declaration of peace issued by the Ottoman Empire. Suvorov moved west and destroyed Polish outer defense units at the Battle of Brest. The corps of Ivan Fersen, previously withdrawn from the siege of Warsaw, crossed the Vistula to join Suvorov and attack the capital from the east. Kościuszko attempted to prevent this concentration of enemy forces and decided to fight a defensive battle at Maciejowice against Fersen. Twice outnumbered in men and cannons, Kościuszko counted on a timely arrival of the corps of Adam Poniński, present nearby. Fersen attacked the insurgents on October 10, before Poniński was able to come, defeated them and took the wounded Kościuszko a prisoner.

The capture of Kościuszko caused a moral breakdown among the leadership and fighters in Warsaw. Tomasz Wawrzecki, chosen as the new supreme commander, was not a military man. Suvorov stormed Praga (Vistula's right bank district of Warsaw) on November 4, killing all the defenders and residents he could find. Warsaw surrendered, utilizing the mediation by King Stanisław August. The chaotic retreat of the insurgent army ended in the November 16 capitulation near Radoszyce.

==== Final partition ====
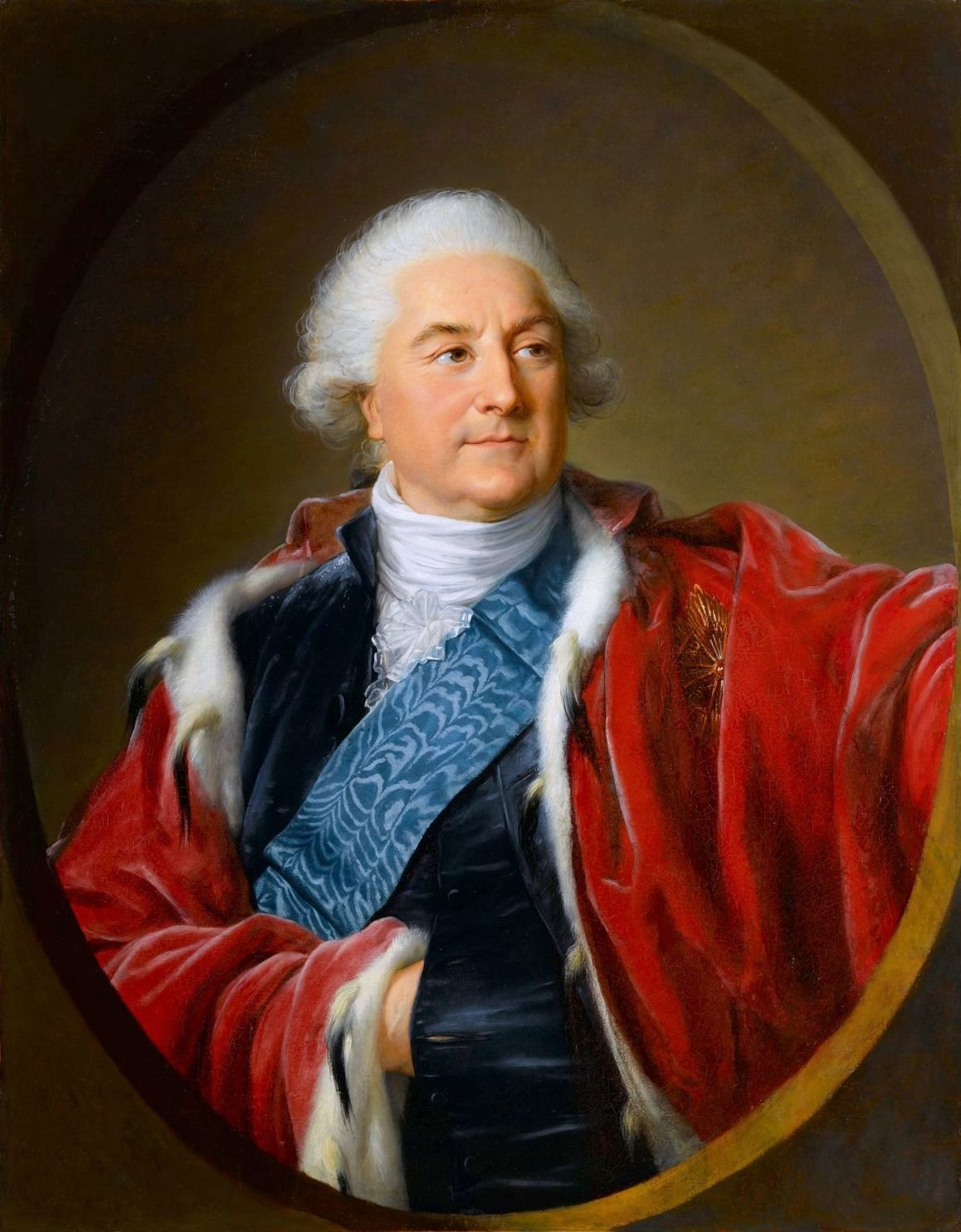
Stanisław August near the end of his life

After the Second Partition, the liquidation of the Polish–Lithuanian Commonwealth was only a matter of time. The uprising of 1794 was the last attempt and the only possible way left to preserve the state heading for destruction. An enormous military effort was made, but szlachta's resistance to full implementation of Kościuszko's social reform left some human resources beyond the reach of the insurgency. Kościuszko Uprising was dominated by the May 3 Constitution era reformers; for most szlachta the Constitution's reforms were the maximum they would tolerate.

The uprising fell because of the overwhelming military advantage of Russia and Prussia. Possible external support, from the Ottoman Empire or revolutionary France, had failed to materialize. Russia ended up arbitrating partition disagreements between Prussia and Austria, which almost resulted in warfare. As Prussia left the anti-French coalition, Austria received Russian support. The Third Partition border arrangements were arrived at on October 24, 1795.

Prussia took over most of Mazovia and Lithuanian Suvalkija and Dzūkija lands up to the Neman River (48,000 km^{2} and about 1 million people). Austria gained Lesser Poland up to the Bug River and parts of Podlasie and Mazovia (47,000 km^{2} and 1.5 million). The rest, the remaining eastern and northern portions of the Commonwealth, was acquired by Russia (120,000 km^{2} and 1.2 million).

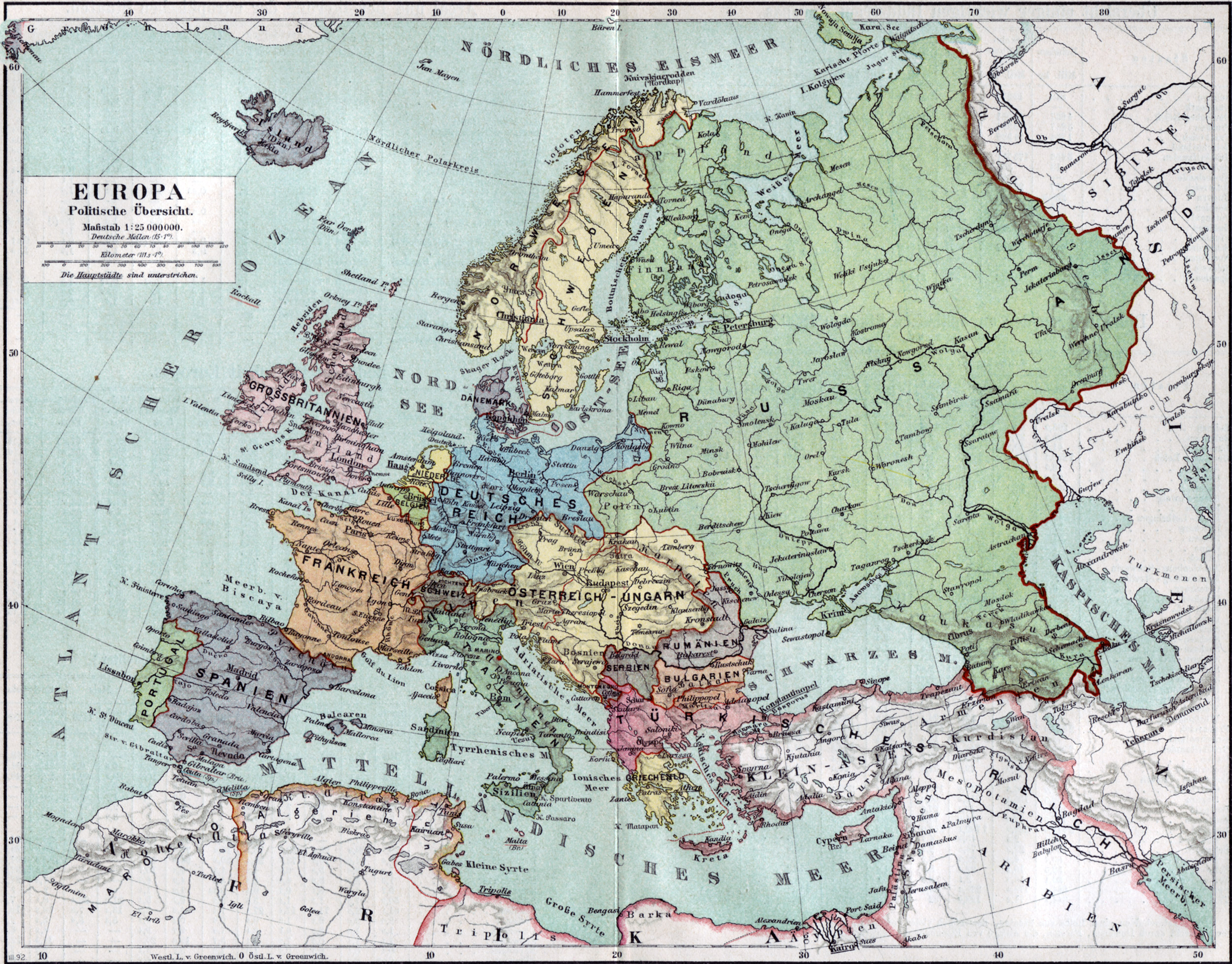
19th century: Europe without Poland and Lithuania

King Stanisław August Poniatowski abdicated, having previously negotiated a satisfaction of his debts and financial obligations by the partitioning powers. He went to St. Petersburg, where he died in 1798. In St. Petersburg, the final convention regarding the territorial and formal elimination of the Kingdom of Poland, whose name was to be permanently erased, was reached on January 26, 1797.

The Third Partition occurred without significant European opposition, because of the, for the Commonwealth, unfavorable political situation, including it being identified with the French Revolution historic movement during the final stages of the Commonwealth's existence. A complete military takeover and termination of the existence of a large state was a unique in 18th-century Europe act of political violence, but the result was that the issue of Poland's independence was to become one of the main problems of European politics during the 19th century.

== See also ==
- Ambassadors and envoys from Russia to Poland (1763–1794)

== Notes ==
a. The last provision shows that this "national" constitution was seen by its creators as being essentially different (more fundamental) from past "constitutions", products of legislative activity of sejms.

b The idea was to deprive the magnate oligarchs of the ability to manipulate and use their petty szlachta followers to prevent normal functioning of sejms and sejmiks and unduly influence politics.

c Of the provincial sejmiks deliberating in 1791 and early 1792, most supported the new constitution.
