= Tomasz Maruszewski =

Tomasz Maruszewski (13 December 1769–1834) was a prominent participant in the Kościuszko Uprising.

== Biography ==
Maruszewski was born on 13 December 1769 in the city of Piotrków Trybunalski, which was then part of the Polish–Lithuanian Commonwealth. He was the son of Antoni and Kunegunda Maruszewski (née Jakubowska). His father was a wealthy merchant.

A burgher and Polish Jacobin, he was a member of Kołłątaj's Forge and was ennobled by the Great Sejm in 1790.

After pro-reform forces were defeated in the 1792 War in Defense of the Constitution, together with Hugo Kołłątaj he emigrated to Saxony, but in 1793 he returned to Poland.

On behalf of Tadeusz Kościuszko he went to Warsaw, where he helped organize the Warsaw Uprising. When the Uprising had succeeded, he was likely responsible for the subsequent execution of Targowica Confederation members.

He left Poland again after the defeat of the Kościuszko Uprising and the Third Partition of Poland (1795).

In the end, he worked closely with Kołłątaj. He died in 1834.
