= Friends of the Constitution =

Polish political party (founded 1791)

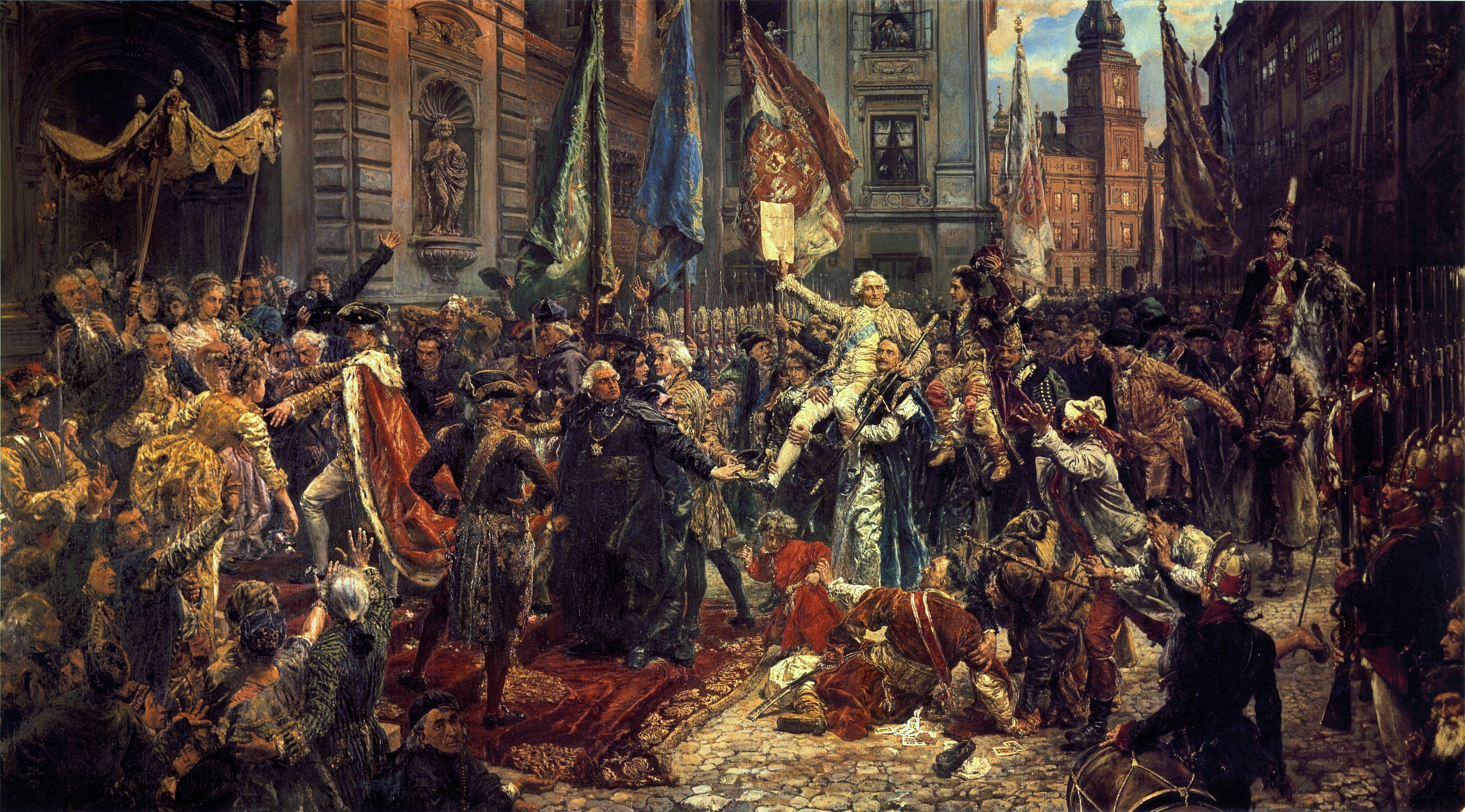
3 May Constitution, by Matejko (1891). King Stanisław August (left, wearing ermine-trimmed cloak) enters St. John's Cathedral, where deputies will swear to uphold the Constitution. Background: Warsaw's Royal Castle, where Constitution has just been adopted.

The Friends of the Constitution (Polish: Zgromadzenie Przyjaciół Konstytucji Rządowej) (Note: In English also variously rendered as Association of Friends of the (Governing) Constitution, Society of Friends of the Government Ordinance, Society of Friends of the Constitution, Assembly of Friends of the Government Constitution) was the first modern Polish political party (with a charter and organizational discipline), formed in May 1791, shortly after the adoption of the Constitution of 3 May 1791, by the efforts of the Patriotic Party. The purpose of the Friends of the Constitution was to defend the reformed political system and to introduce further reforms.

The party's leading members included Hugo Kołłątaj, Ignacy Potocki, Tadeusz Mostowski, Michał Ossowski and Józef Weyssenhof.

The Friends of the Constitution published a periodical, Gazeta Narodowa i Obca (The National and Foreign Gazette).

== History ==
In the name "Zgromadzenie Przyjaciół Konstytucji Rządowej", the expression "zgromadzenie" may be rendered in English as "gathering", "assembly" or "congress".

The Friends of the Constitution had their own charter and organizational discipline and have been described as the first modern political party in Poland.

Since many of the party's members participated in the Sejm's (parliament's) deliberations, the Friends of the Constitution have also been described as the first Polish parliamentary caucus.

Members were also active outside the Sejm and enjoyed support among many segments of society, from szlachta (nobility) salons to more radical, Jacobin-influenced bourgeois circles.

The first meeting of the Friends of the Constitution took place on 21 May 1791. Their charter declared their support for the May 3 Constitution, and their aim of perfecting the Constitution and the polity that it served.

The party numbered at least 213 members whose names are known to history, including those of 126 deputies and 14 senators. Most of the members were of the szlachta, but at least 7 were townsmen. The charter stipulated that all members were equal. Decisions were taken by majority vote. Many members had connections with the Patriotic Party.

Prominent members included: Deputy Chancellor of the Crown Hugo Kołłątaj, Prince Adam Kazimierz Czartoryski, Prince Józef Poniatowski, Marcin Badeni, Franciszek Barss, Joachim Chreptowicz, Jan August Cichocki, Ignacy Dembiński, Ignacy Działyński, Ksawery Działyński, Antoni Dzieduszycki, Augustyn Gorzeński, Paweł Jerzy Grabowski, Ludwik Szymon Gutakowski, Janusz Stanisław Iliński, Michał Kochanowski, Stanisław Kublicki, Jan Paweł Łuszczewski, Antoni Madaliński, Józef Andrzej Mikorski, Mikołaj Morawski, Tadeusz Mostowski, Adam Naruszewicz, Julian Ursyn Niemcewicz, Józef Kajetan Ossoliński, Tomasz Adam Ostrowski, Scipione Piattoli, Grzegorz Piramowicz, Ignacy Potocki, Stanisław Kostka Potocki, Józef Ignacy Rybiński, Walenty Sobolewski, Stanisław Sołtan, Stanisław Sołtyk, Michał Strasz, Józef Weyssenhoff, Mikołaj Wolski, Ignacy Wyssogota Zakrzewski.

The founding members of the Friends of the Constitution included King Stanisław August Poniatowski's Italian secretary, Scipione Piattoli, who appears in the above list of prominent members. Notable absentees included the King himself (a co-author of the Constitution of 3 May 1791) and Stanisław Małachowski, the Marshal of the Great Sejm, both of whom preferred to maintain a semblance of political neutrality.

The party's meetings were generally held at the Radziwiłł Palace — now the Presidential Palace — on Warsaw's Krakowskie Przedmieście, a few minutes' walk from the Royal Castle.

The Friends of the Constitution were active until the Commonwealth's defeat in the War in Defense of the Constitution and the demise of the 3 May Constitution.

== See also ==
- History of Poland (1569–1795)
