= Franciszek Salezy Jezierski =

Polish political activist (1740–1791)

Franciszek Salezy Jezierski (1740 – 1791) was a Polish priest, social and political activist, and writer of the Enlightenment period.

He was born in Gołąbki near Łuków in the Lublin Voivodeship of the Kingdom of Poland to Jan Franciszek Jezierski and Izabela Skarbek-Kiełczewska; he studied at the Piarist School in Łuków, and worked as a notary before doing his military service in Ukraine.

He studied for the priesthood and in 1781, the National Education Commission appointed him as rector of Lublin. In 1783, he completed his doctorate in theology and philosophy at the Kraków Academy, and two years later became the general inspector of the Crown schools. He then joined Hugo Kołłątaj's Forge and worked as a librarian at the Jagiellonian University.

A supporter of the radical reforms, he attacked the privileges of the nobility (even through he was a petty noble himself) and supported the causes of burghers and peasants.

In 1788, he wrote the “Sermon before the States of the Republic” speech which was delivered at the beginning of the Great Sejm.

In 1962, the city of Warsaw commemorated him by naming a street in Warsaw's Powiśle after him.

== Publications ==
His publications include;

- "Jarosz Kutasiński of the Dęboróg coat of arms, a nobleman from Łuków, remarks on the non-noble state in Poland";
- "Gowórek of the Rawicz coat of arms" (1789);
- "Catechism on the secrets of the Polish government" (1790);
- "Rzepicha, the mother of kings" (1790)
