= Julian Ursyn Niemcewicz =

Polish poet, playwright and statesman (1758–1841)

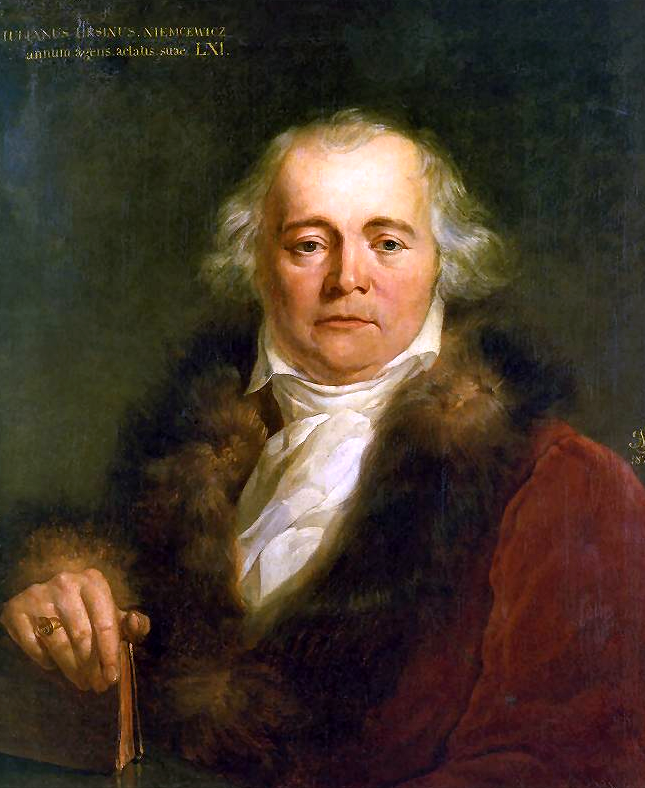
- Portrait by Antoni Brodowski, 1820

- Coat of arms
- Born: 6 February 1758; Skoki, Polish–Lithuanian Commonwealth
- Died: 21 May 1841 (aged 83); Paris, France
- Spouse: Susan Livingston Kean (m. 1800; died 1833)
- Occupation: Poet; playwright; statesman

Julian Ursyn Niemcewicz (US: /njɛmtˈseɪvɪtʃ/ nyemt-SAY-vitch, Polish: [ˈjuljan ˈursɨn ɲɛmˈtsɛvitʂ]; 6 February 1758 – 21 May 1841) was a Polish poet, playwright and statesman. He was a leading advocate for the Polish–Lithuanian Commonwealth's Constitution of 3 May 1791.

== Early life and education ==
Julian Ursyn Niemcewicz was born 6 February 1758 in Skoki, near Brest in the Polish–Lithuanian Commonwealth (present-day Belarus). The son of a moderately well-to-do Polish noble family, Niemcewicz graduated from the Warsaw Corps of Cadets.

== Career ==
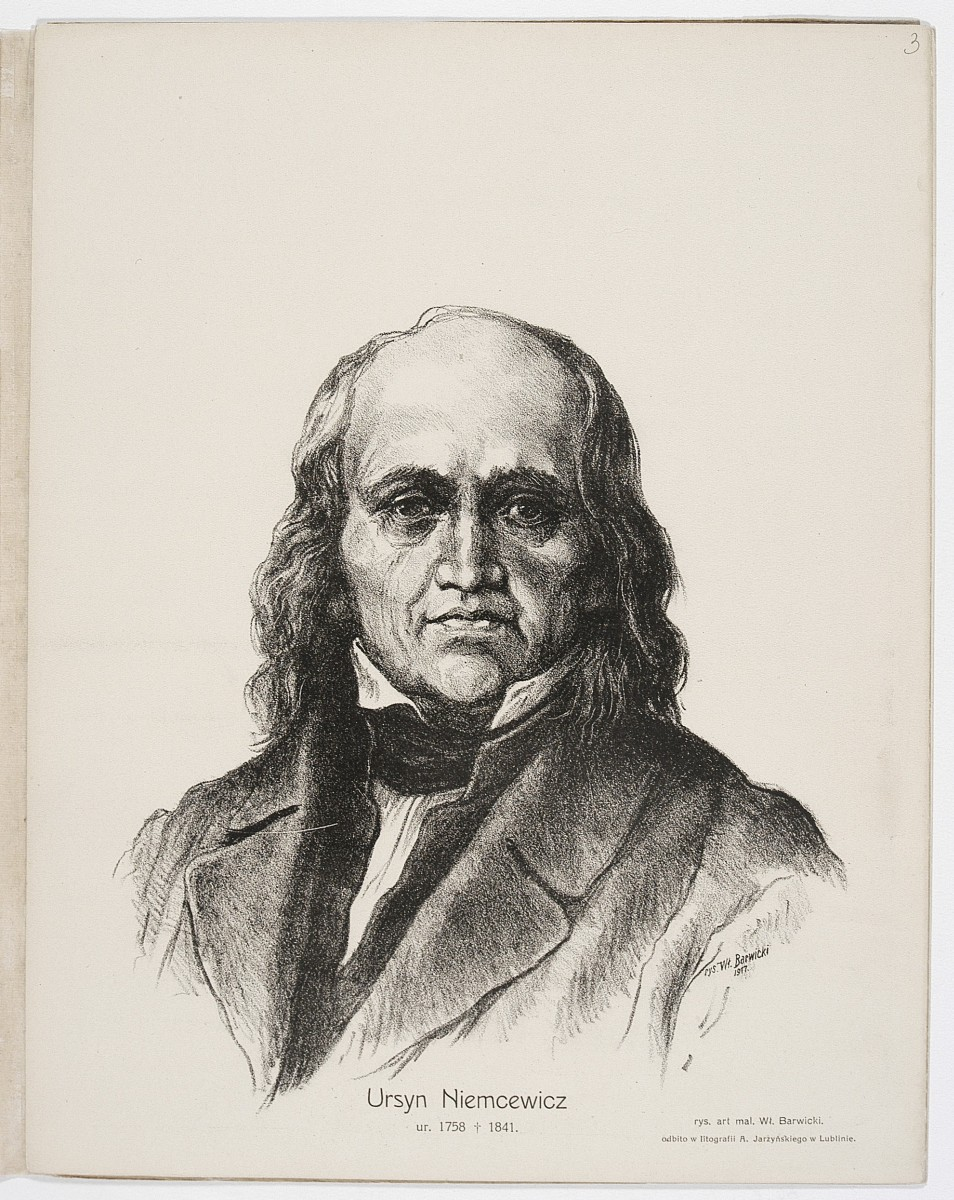
Niemcewicz, a portrait

After graduating from the Corps of Cadets, he subsequently served as aide to Adam Kazimierz Czartoryski and visited France, England and Italy. Niemcewicz served as a deputy to the Great Sejm of 1788–1792 and was an active member of the Patriotic Party that pushed through adoption of the historic Constitution of 3 May 1791. He was subsequently a founder of the Friends of the Constitution, formed to support the implementation of that progressive document. After the victory of the Targowica Confederation in 1792 and the consequent overthrow of the May 3 Constitution, Niemcewicz, along with other Patriotic Party members, emigrated to Germany.

During the Kościuszko Uprising in 1794, Niemcewicz served as aide to Tadeusz Kościuszko. Both were captured by the Russians at the Battle of Maciejowice in 1794 and imprisoned in the Peter and Paul Fortress at St. Petersburg along with Niemcewicz's aide-de-camp named Kuźniewski. In 1796, on the death of Tsaritsa Catherine the Great, they were released by Tsar Paul I and made their way together to the United States. They sailed on the ship Adriana from Bristol, in England, in the company of the Portuguese abbot and botanist, José Correia da Serra, who served as the chaplain on ship for Niemcewicz and Kościuszko. They arrived in Philadelphia on August 18, 1797. During his stay, he visited Niagara Falls. In 1798, he was elected a member of the American Philosophical Society.

Niemcewicz was upset when Kościuszko decamped for Europe without giving him any notice. After Napoleon's 1807 invasion of Poland, Niemcewicz returned to Warsaw and was made secretary of the senate. After the Congress of Vienna, he was secretary of state and president of the constitutional committee in Poland. In the years of the Kingdom of Poland Niemcewicz was the central figure of Polish cultural life and his moral influence was sometimes compared with political and military strength of Grand Duke Constantine.

On 11 May 1830, he unveiled a new landmark before the Staszic Palace, the seat of the Society of Friends of Science in Warsaw — a monument to Nicolaus Copernicus sculpted by Bertel Thorvaldsen. During the failed November Uprising of 1830–31, Niemcewicz was a member of the insurrectionary Polish government. In the final months of the Uprising the poet went on a diplomatic mission to London (as the last Polish envoy to Britain) and he remained in exile, first in Britain, then in France, until his death in 1841.

=== Works ===
As a writer, Niemcewicz tried many styles of composition. His political comedy, The Return of the Deputy (1790), enjoyed great acclaim. His novel, John of Tenczyn (1825), written in the style of Sir Walter Scott, gives a vigorous picture of old Poland. He also wrote a History of the Reign of Sigismund III (3 volumes, 1819) and a collection of memoirs for ancient Polish history (6 volumes, 1822–23).

Niemcewicz's 1817 pamphlet Rok 3333 czyli sen niesłychany (The Year 3333, or an Incredible Dream), first published posthumously in 1858, describes a Poland transformed into a sinister Judeo-Polonia. The pamphlet has been described as "the first Polish work to develop on a large scale the concept of an organized Jewish conspiracy directly threatening the existing social structure." His collected works were published in 12 volumes at Leipzig in 1838–40.

== Personal life ==
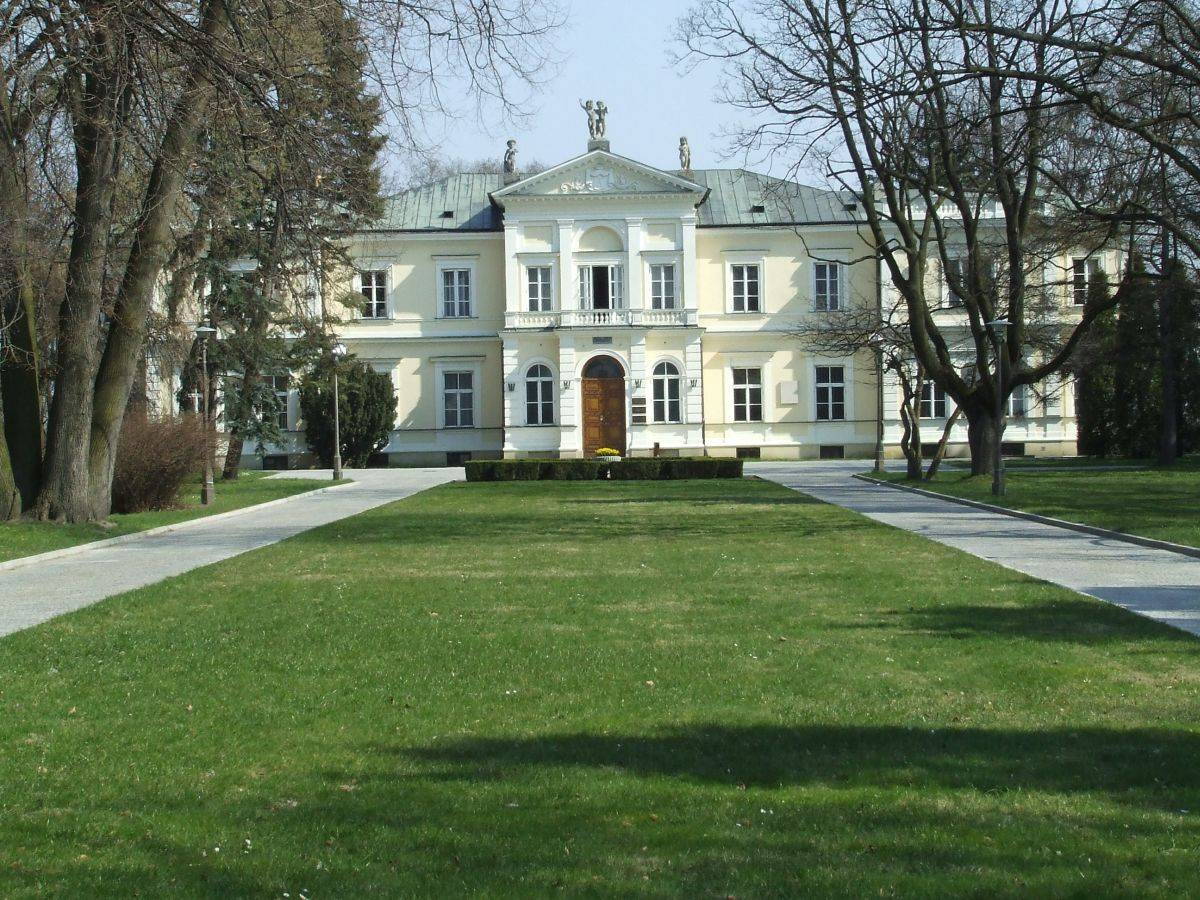
Krasiński Palace in Warsaw, Niemcewicz's residence from 1782

While in the United States, Niemcewicz met and married the wealthy widow, Mrs. Livingston Kean (née Susan Livingston) in 1800 who had hired him as a tutor for her son Peter Kean. Susan, a member of the Livingston family, was the daughter of Peter Van Brugh Livingston and the widow of John Kean, a delegate from South Carolina to the Continental Congress.

He died on 21 May 1841 in Paris, France, aged 83, and was buried at Champeaux Cemetery in Montmorency, Val-d'Oise.

== Published works ==
- Władysław pod Warną (Władysław at Varna, 1788)
- Kazimierz Wielki (Kazimierz the Great, 1792)
- Powrót posła (The Return of the Deputy, 1791)
- Na hersztów targowieckich (The Targowica Chiefs)
- Podróże historyczne po ziemiach polskich (Historic Travels over the Polish Lands)
- Śpiewy historyczne (Historic Songs)
- Dzieje panowania Zygmunta III (A History of the Reign of Zygmunt III)
- Under their Vine and Fig Tree: Travels through America in 1797-1799, 1805 with some further account of life in New Jersey (Edited by Budka)
