= Kazimierz Konopka =

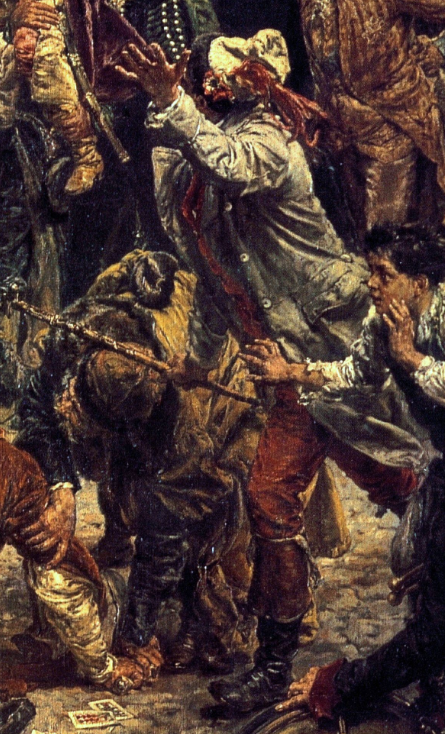
Kazimierz Konopka in Jan Matejko's 1891 painting, Constitution of 3 May 1791.

Kazimierz Konopka (1769–1805 or 1809) was a Polish Jacobin, secretary of Hugo Kołłątaj, officer in the Polish Legions, aide-de-camp of Jan Henryk Dąbrowski. He gained notoriety for his involvements in the unrest and hangings in Warsaw during the Kościuszko Uprising.

== Biography ==
Konopka was born in 1769 to a burgher family in Poznań. He studies law in Kraków, where he was a lawyer applicant in the F. Barss legal practice. Member of the Kołłątaj's Forge organization and one of the Polish Jacobins, and secretary to Hugo Kołłątaj; during Kołlataj's period as the Deputy Crown Chancellor (podkanclerz koronny) in 1791, Konopka held the position of the Secretary of the Lesser Seal (sekretarz pieczęci mniejszej).

He participated in the Kościuszko Uprising, joining the cavalry. During that period, around May and June 1794, he gained notoriety as one of the leaders of the demonstrations and riots in Warsaw. In particular, he was involved in the "hanging of the traitors" incident around 28 June. In this incident, not supported by the insurrectionist government, out of several people hanged, including insurrection opponents such as chamberlain Karol Boscamp-Lasopolski, prince Antoni Stanisław Czetwertyński-Światopełk and bishop Ignacy Jakub Massalski, the defense attorney and a prosecutor who attempted to stop the mob were also beaten and hanged; they included a friend of Tadeusz Kościuszko, advocate Michał Wulfers. For his involvement in the incident, Koponka was sentenced by the insurrectionist court to an exile (banicja).

Koponka left for France, where he joined French cavalry, and fought in Corsica. In the aftermath of the final Third Partition of Poland, after Polish Legions were recreated under the French control in Italy, he became involved in the formation creation, reaching a rank of a captain or major (sources vary). He commanded a squadron, and later, a baon. In 1801 he was an aide-de-camp of Jan Henryk Dąbrowski.

He died in 1805 in Bari (Pachoński mentions a sudden heart attack) or in 1809 (according to Rusinowa).

Konopka is one of the figures immortalized in Jan Matejko's 1891 painting, Constitution of 3 May 1791. He is shown near the center, with an outstretched hand, holding the czekan (an ax- and hammer-like weapon) and with a French blue-white-red flower in his hat.
