= Kołłątaj =

Kołłątaj is a Polish language surname. It is commonly rendered into English without diacritics as Kollataj. The Russian language version is Kollontay.

The surname may refer to:

- Antoni Kołłątaj (1776–1794), nephew of Hugo
- Benedykt Kołłątaj, Polish-Lithuanian lieutenant
- Hugo Kołłątaj (1750–1812), Polish Roman Catholic priest, social and political activist, political thinker, historian and philosopher
  - Kołłątaj's Forge, a group of activists and writers
- Jan Kołłątaj-Srzednicki (1883–1944), Polish brigadier general
- Rafał Kołłątaj (1750–1833), Polish nobleman and brother of Hugo
