= Józef Peszka =

Polish artist and art professor (1767–1831)

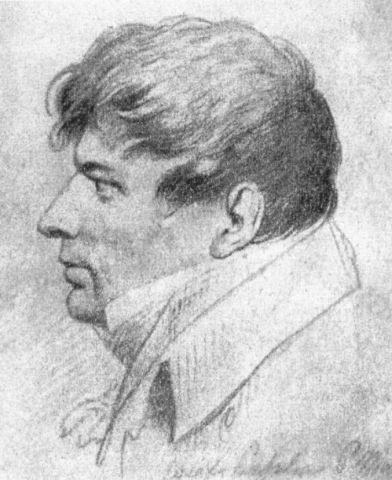
Józef Peszka by an unknown artist

Józef Peszka (19 February 1767 – 14 September 1831) was a Polish painter and art professor; known mostly for his portraits and watercolor landscapes.

== Biography ==
He was born in Kraków. His first drawing lessons were with Dominik Oesterreicher, an Austrian painter living in Kraków. He then studied painting in Warsaw with Franciszek Smuglewicz. After doing a portrait of Hugo Kołłątaj, he was introduced to members of the Great Sejm and earned a commission to do portraits of other prominent political figures; work which kept him occupied until 1792.

After that, until 1812, he took numerous trips throughout Lithuania and Russia, where he created watercolor and sepia toned landscapes with staffage as well as some vedute. He spent some time with his former mentor, Smuglewicz, at Vilnius University. From 1807 to 1810, he lingered in Niasvizh where he served as a court painter to Prince Michał Hieronim Radziwiłł.

In 1813, he returned to Kraków and taught art at the Jagiellonian University. In 1818, he helped organize the newly established School of Fine Arts and became a professor there. In 1831, a few months before his death, he was named director. During that time, he concentrated on painting portraits; mostly of military heroes, wealthy businessmen and their families and figures of the Polish Enlightenment. He also did some historical scenes, which show the influence of Smuglewicz, and some scenes from Classical mythology.

== Selected paintings ==
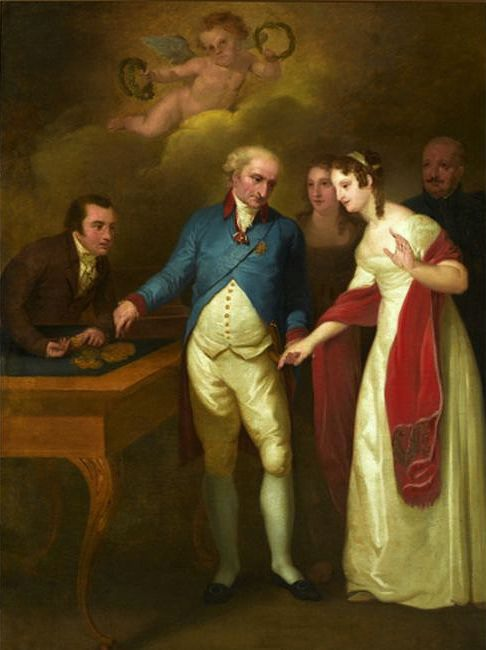
Stanisław Małachowski

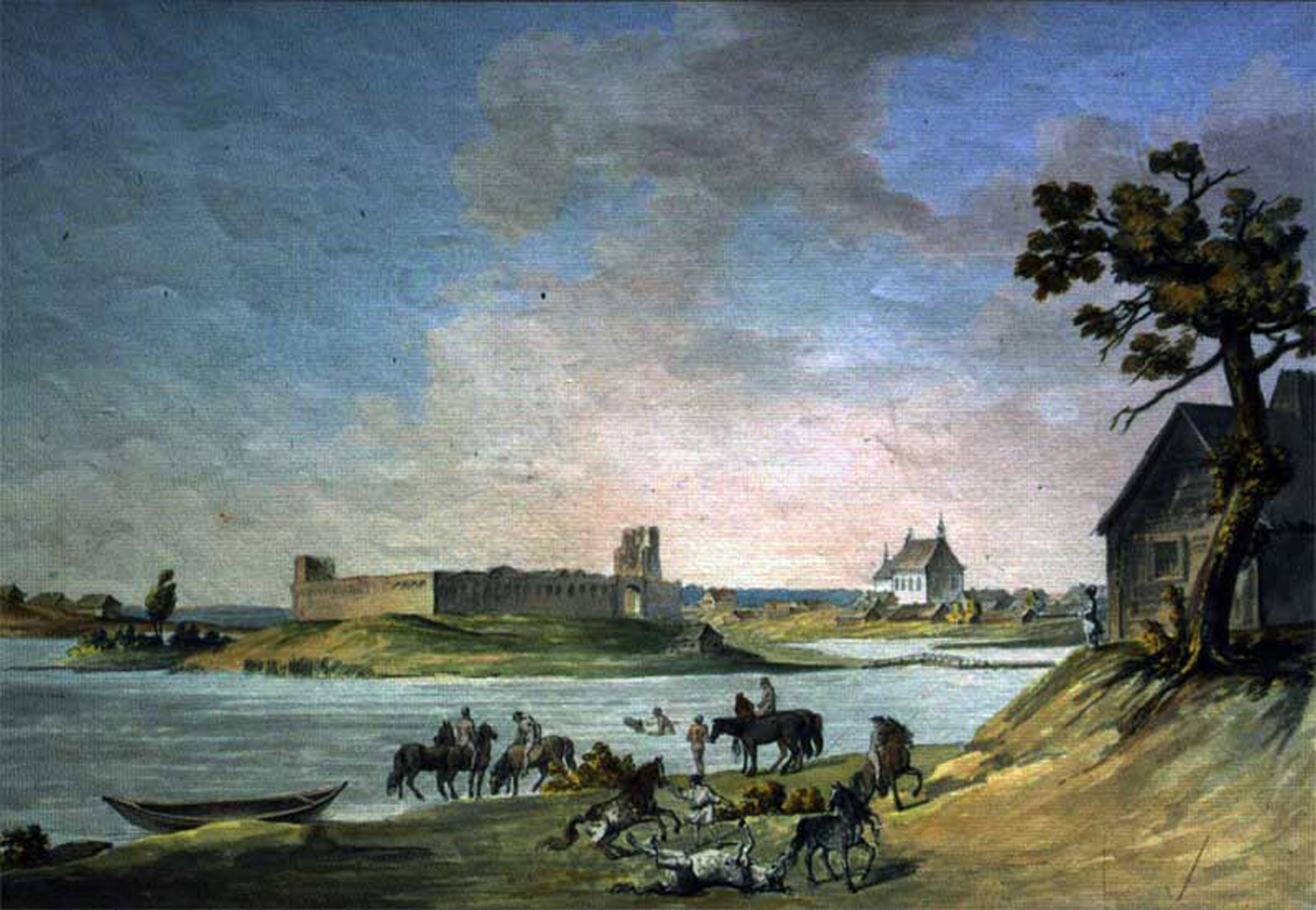
View of Lida

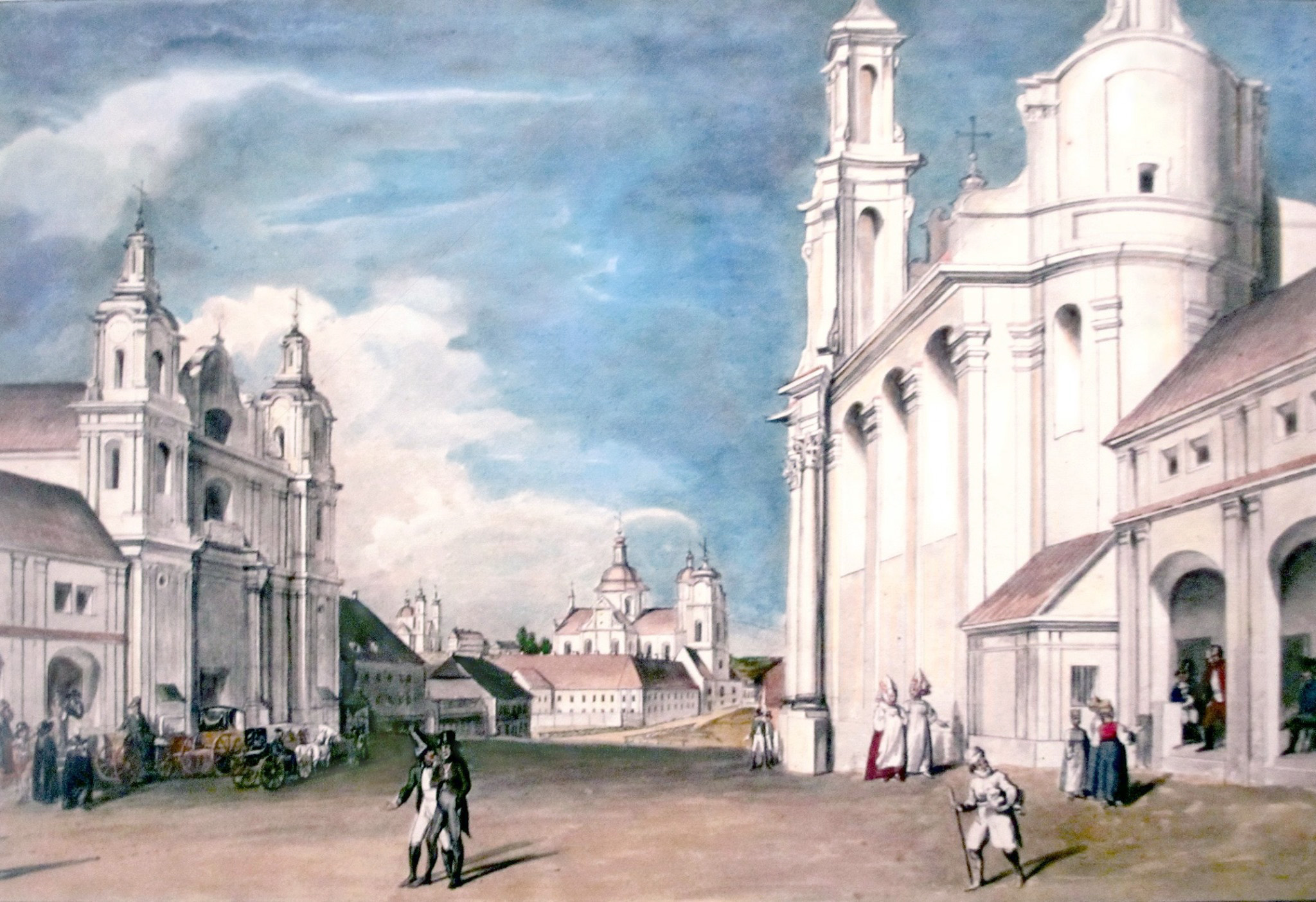
Street Scene in Vitebsk

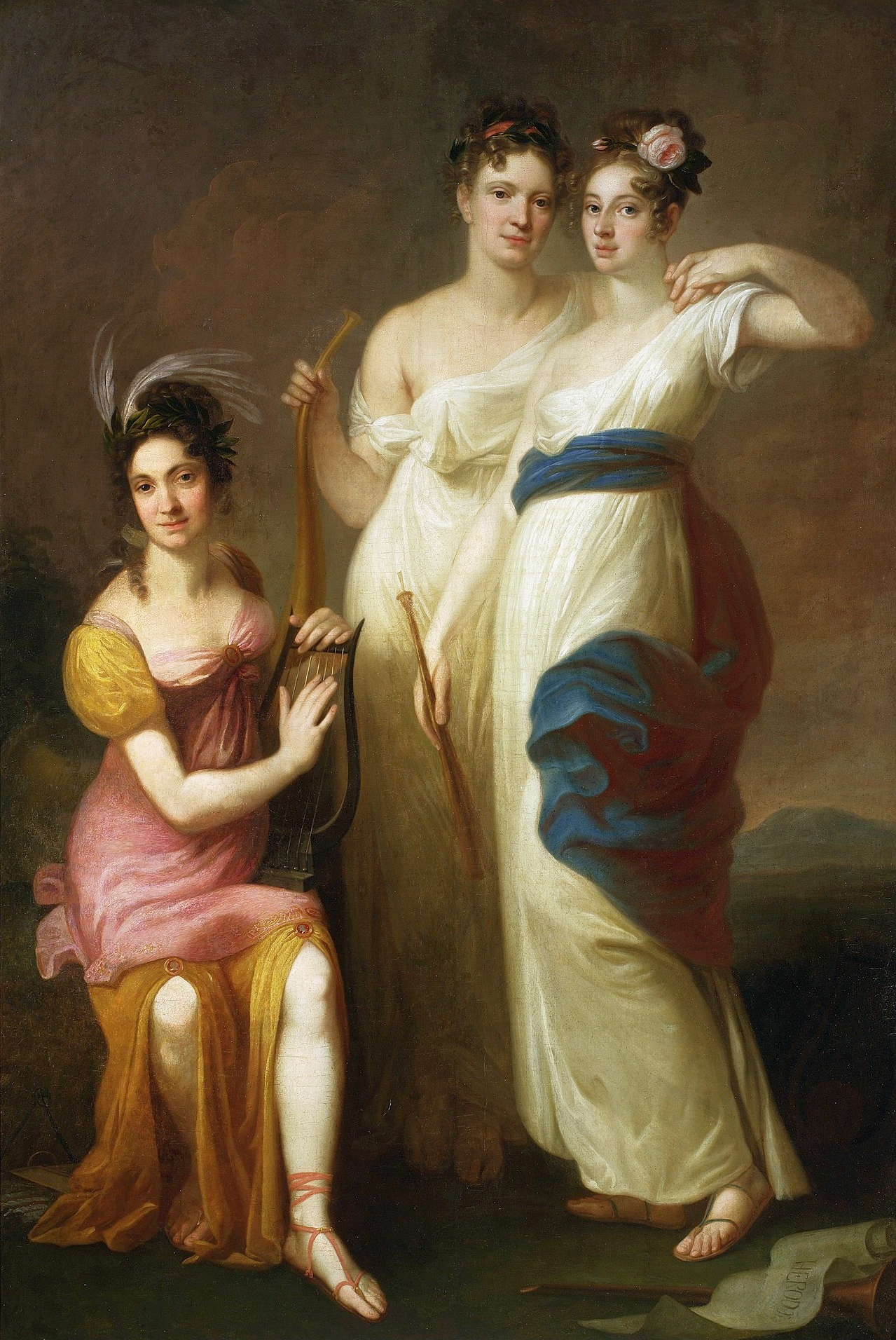
Three Muses
