= Polish Jacobins =

Polish Jacobins (Polish: jakobini polscy) or Huguenots (hugoniści) were the names given to a group of late 18th-century radical Polish politicians by their opponents.

The group formed during the Great Sejm as an offshoot of the Forge of Hugo Kołłątaj (Kuźnia Kołłątajska, and hence their alternate name of Huguenots (Hugoniści)), and later the Patriotic Party (Stronnictwo Patriotyczne). The Polish Jacobins played a significant part in the preparation of the 1794 Warsaw and Wilno Uprisings during the Kościuszko Uprising.Under the name of Association of Citizens Offering Help and Assistance to the National Magistrate for the Good of the Homeland (Zgromadzenie Obywateli Ofiarujących Pomoc i Posługę Magistraturom Narodowym w Celu Dobra Ojczyzny) they formed a political club (based on French Jacobin Club) which became part of the provisional government of Poland (Temporary Provisional Council, Radza Zastępcza Tymczasowa). For their support for lynching supporters of the Targowica Confederation, they were abolished by Tadeusz Kościuszko, but as the uprising neared its defeat they were reactivated under the name of Association for Supporting the Revolution and the Cracow Act (Zgromadzenie dla Utrzymania Rewolucji i Aktu Krakowskiego). After the third partition of Poland, many Jacobins emigrated and joined the Polish Legions in Italy. Many of those who remained in Poland took part in various conspirational organizations, such as the Association of Polish Republicans (Towarzystwo Republikanów Polskich). Eventually, some prominent Jacobins like Józef Zajączek became part of the government of the Duchy of Warsaw and later Congress Poland. During the November Uprising they were reactivated as the Patriotic Society (Towarzystwo Patriotyczne), founded by Joachim Lelewel. Polish Jacobins slowly became absorbed into other groups of the Great Emigration, although traces of their ideas were visible not only in the January Uprising but also in Józef Piłsudski's Polish Socialist Party (Polska Partia Socjalistyczna).

Their political views had much in common with French Jacobins. They supported the French Revolution and wanted to transplant most of its ideals to Poland, to abolish monarchy and serfdom, equalize the privileges of the various social classes, nationalize property (as a temporary measure for funding the war), and limit the privileges of the Catholic Church (although unlike radical French Jacobins, their stance was not anti-Christian).

== List of activists ==
The main activists were:

- Hugo Kołłątaj
- Jakub Jasiński
- Józef Pawlikowski
- Jan Alojzy Orchowski
- Józef Zajączek
- Tomasz Maruszewski
- Józef Kalasanty Szaniawski
- Jan Czyński
- Tadeusz Krępowiecki
- Maurycy Mochnacki
- Kazimierz Konopka
