= Kollontay =

Kollontay (also Kollontai, Russian: Коллонтай) is a Russian language transcription of the Polish surname Kołłątaj.

It can refer to the following people:

- Alexandra Kollontay (Kollontai) (1872–1952) — Russian Communist revolutionary, Soviet statesman and ambassador
- Mikhail Kollontay (b. 1952) — Russian composer and pianist
