= Kołłątaj's Forge =

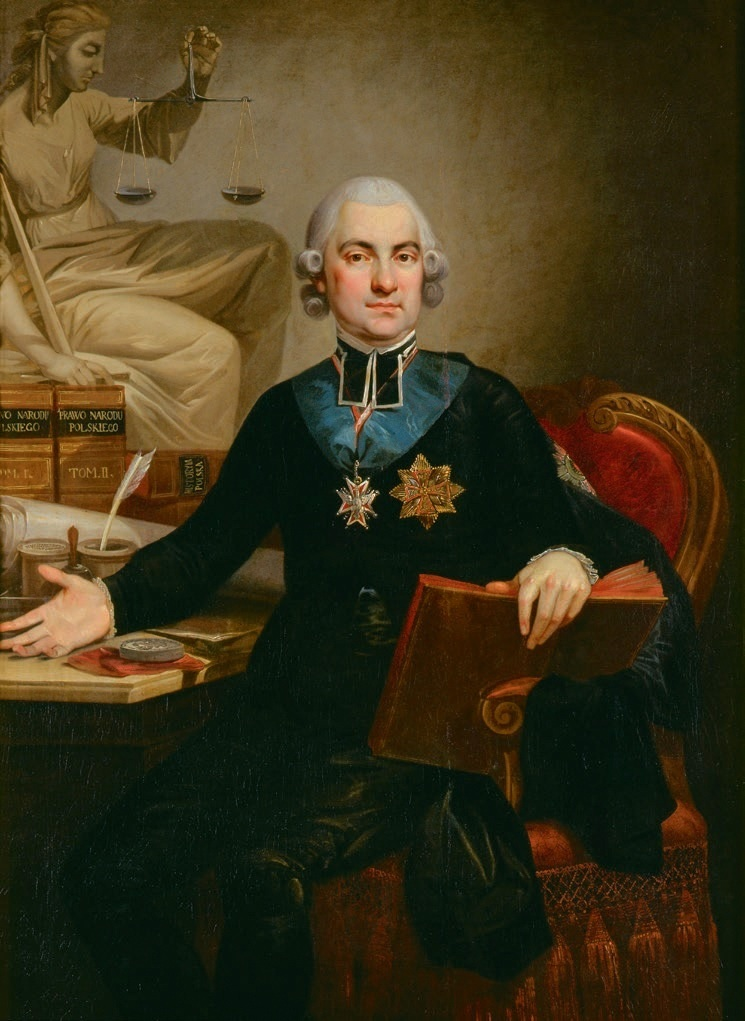
Hugo Kołłątaj, Polish thinker after whom the Forge was named

The Kołłątaj's Forge (Polish: Kuźnica Kołłątajowska) was a group of social and political activists, publicists and writers from the period of the Great Sejm in the Polish–Lithuanian Commonwealth.

Centered on Hugo Kołłątaj, one of the most prominent thinkers of the Polish Enlightenment, the Forge (Kuźnica) activists formed a radical, leftist faction of the reform supporters (the Patriotic Party, an organization that has been called the first Polish political party). They disseminated news and ideas of the French Revolution in Poland. Their pamphlets criticized feudalism and privileges of the nobility. Their name, Kołłataj's Forge, was given to them by their political opponents, and was originally pejorative.

== Early development ==
Kołłątaj put forward the manifesto of the Forge in a series of anonymous letters to the Marshal of the Sejm, Stanisław Małachowski. These letters were published in 1788–1789 as: To Stanisław Małachowski... Several Letters from an Anonymous Writer (literal translation of Do Stanisława Małachowskiego... Anonyma listów kilka). The work has also been rendered into English as the "Letters from an Anonymous Writer" or "Anonymous Letters to Stanisław Małachowski". They were supplemented in 1790 by the "Political Law(s) of the Polish Nation" (Prawo polityczne narodu polskiego). Kołłątaj criticized the dysfunctional politics of the Commonwealth, which were dominated by powerful magnates, and called for various reforms such as the strengthening of executive (royal) power, improvement of the state's military, elimination of liberum veto, universal taxation, and the emancipation of underprivileged classes (primarily, burghers and the peasantry). The Forge's projects were highly refined; in fact the "Political Law", which contained the proposal for a new constitution became a major inspiration for the Constitution of 3 May.

== Public support ==
Kołłątaj and other publicists from his group were quite able to influence contemporary public opinion in the Polish–Lithuanian Commonwealth. They were very active, and campaigned not only in the parliament (the Great Sejm) but also outside of it, gathering support from regular citizens. The Forge writers were particularly adept at ridiculing their political opponents; so in addition to serious treaties, articles and letters, they often published satirical pamphlets.

Many of the Forge activists came from outside of the Polish nobility (szlachta), which traditionally saw state politics as their exclusive territory. The Forge had strong ties to the bourgeoisie of Polish cities and towns, and to a significant degree was able to influence and control their demonstrations. This was used to bring up the fact of the growing importance of the burghers, the need to include them in state politics, and to deliver a warning to the more traditionally-minded politicians about the growing dangers of resisting change.

The group was small enough that one of their principal meeting places was Kołłątaj's home in Warsaw. Key activists of the Forge, besides Kołłątaj himself, included Franciszek Salezy Jezierski, Franciszek Ksawery Dmochowski, Józef Meier (Mejer), Antoni Trebicki (Trębicki), Franciszek Jelski, Tomasz Maruszewski, Jan Dembowski and Kazimierz Konopka. Other supporters included Franciszek Zabłocki, Jan Śniadecki and Julian Ursyn Niemcewicz. Many of them emigrated after the victory of the Targowica Confederation in the War in Defense of the Constitution, or after the final Third Partition of Poland.

Whereas Kołłątaj himself was more of a moderate, some of the Forge's followers were more radical, and many of the Polish Jacobins of the 1794 Kościuszko Uprising were Forge's members.

Forge activists usually met in the Kołłątaj's house that was located in the Solec neighborhood in Warsaw.

== See also ==
- Black Procession
- reform movement
