= Stanisław Kostka Potocki =

Polish noble, politician, writer, 3rd Prime Minister

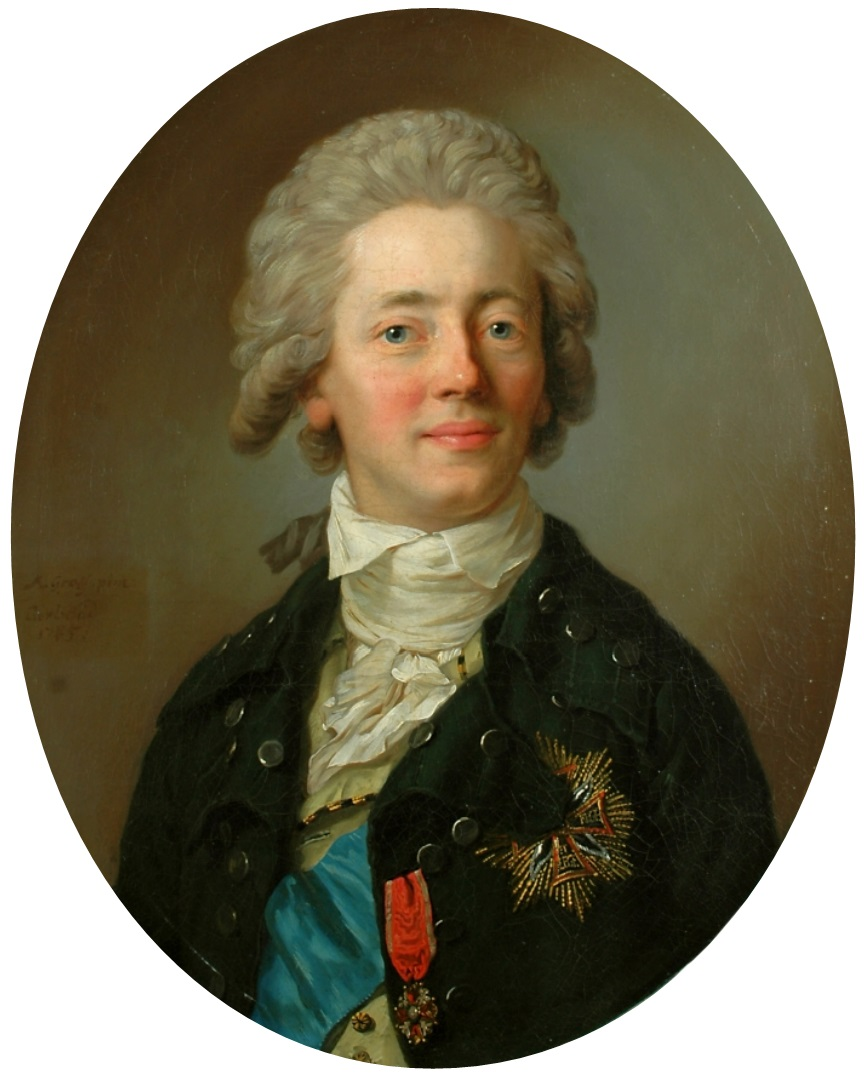
- Portrait by Anton Graff, 1785

3rd Prime Minister of Duchy of Warsaw
- In office 23 March 1809 – May 1813 (de facto); 16 June 1815 (de jure)
- Monarch: Frederick Augustus I
- Preceded by: Ludwik Szymon Gutakowski
- Succeeded by: Adam Jerzy Czartoryski (as President of the Administrative Council)

Personal details
- Born: November 1755 Lublin, Polish-Lithuanian Commonwealth
- Died: 14 September 1821 (aged 65) Wilanów, Congress Poland
- Spouse: Aleksandra Lubomirska
- Children: Aleksander Stanisław Potocki

Count Stanisław Kostka Potocki (Polish pronunciation: [staˈɲiswaf ˈkɔstka pɔˈtɔt͡skʲi]; November 1755 – 14 September 1821) was a Polish nobleman, politician, writer, public intellectual, and patron of the arts. He was involved in public education and active in the period that has been termed as the Polish Enlightenment. He was of the Pilawa coat of arms.

== Life ==
Potocki was a son of General and starost of Lwów, Eustace Potocki and Anna Kątska, and was a brother of Ignacy Potocki. Other brothers included Jerzy Michał Potocki and Jan Nepomucen Eryk. They were taken care of by the state after the death of their parents in 1768. The boys were educated at the Collegium Nobilium in Warsaw and in 1772 Stanisław went to the military academy in Turin. He travelled through Europe and on returning, he married Princess Aleksandra Lubomirska, the daughter of Great Marshal of the Crown, Prince Stanisław Lubomirski, on 2 June 1776. His brother Ignacy was married to Elżbieta, the sister of Aleksandra. The couples lived in Olesin near Pulawy.

He visited Rome in 1780, where he was painted by Jacques-Louis David. He was an alumnus of the Collegium Nobilium in Warsaw, and later studied Polonistics, literature and arts in Wilanów. He became Great Podstoli of the Crown in 1781–1784. He began to construct a new palace in Kurów and reconstructed the palace in Leszno. In 1784 he became head of the Polish Freemasonry. He was persuaded to be a witness during the Dogrum affair (1784-85) but found the process unfair and moved to Carlsbad to rest. He also travelled in Italy, collecting artworks. In 1786 he ran for parliamentary elections for Sejm. In 1792, he became an Artillery General of the Crown and participated in the War in Defense of the Constitution. He was a deputy of Lublin and one of the leaders of the Patriotic Party on the Four-Year Sejm. He served briefly in the war with Russia in 1792 and then went to live in Saxony. He was expelled from Dresden in 1794 and imprisoned by the Austrian police. He was released in 1795 and he went to Italy.

Potocki was a co-founder of the Society of Friends of Science (Towarzystwo Przyjaciół Nauk, or TPN) in Warsaw in 1800. From 1807 he was a member of the Governing Commission (Komisja Rządząca), chairman of the Education Chamber (Izba Edukacyjna), and from 1810 director of the Commission of National Education (Komisja Edukacji Narodowej) in the Duchy of Warsaw.

In 1809 he became chairman of the Council of State (Rada Stanu) and the Council of Ministers (Rada Ministrów). In 1818–20 he was chairman of the Senate.

Potocki organized archaeological excavations in Italy, inter alia in Laurentum in 1779 and Nola in 1785–1786. He collected art, mainly paintings, graphics and antique ceramics. His collection exhibited in Wilanów in 1805, initiating one of the first museums in Poland.

Potocki died on 14 September 1821 and was buried in the church of Wilanów.

== Awards ==
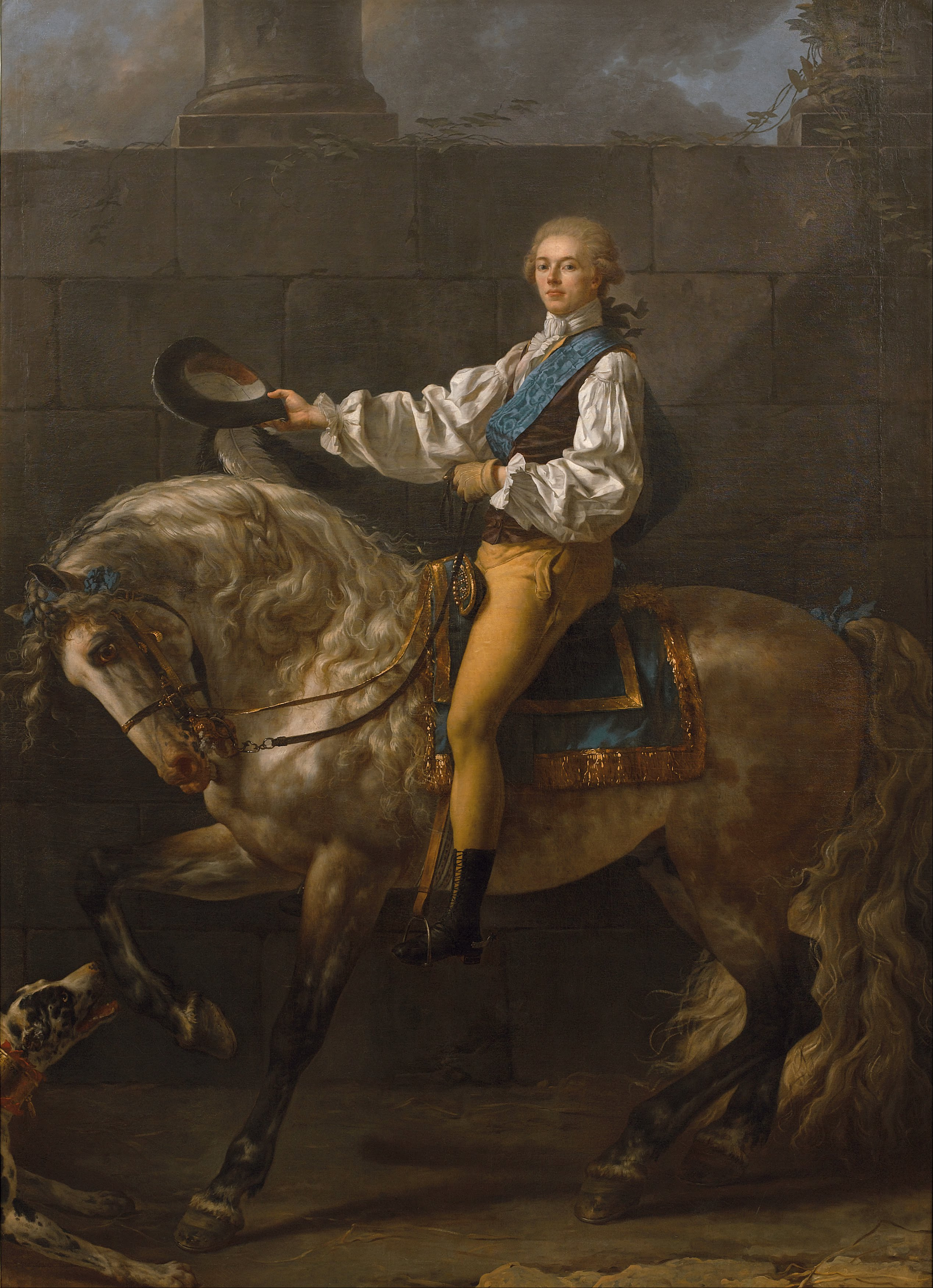
Portrait of Count Stanislas Potocki by Jacques-Louis David, Wilanów Palace

- Knight of the Order of the White Eagle, awarded in 1781.
- Knight of the Order of Saint Stanislaus
- Knight of the Order of Saint Louis
- Légion d'honneur

== Works ==
- Świstek krytyczny ("Pamiętnik Warszawski", 1816–18)
- Podróż do Ciemnogrodu (A Journey to Dunceville, t. 1–4, 1820)

== See also ==
- History of philosophy in Poland
- List of Poles
