= Patriotic Party =

Patriotic Party Polish: Stronnictwo Patriotyczne
- Leaders: Ignacy Potocki; Adam Kazimierz Czartoryski; Stanisław Małachowski
- Founded: 1788
- Dissolved: 1795
- Headquarters: Kraków
- Ideology: Pro-Reform; Constitutionalism; Egalitarianism; Nationalism; Polish jacobinism
- Political position: Left-wing

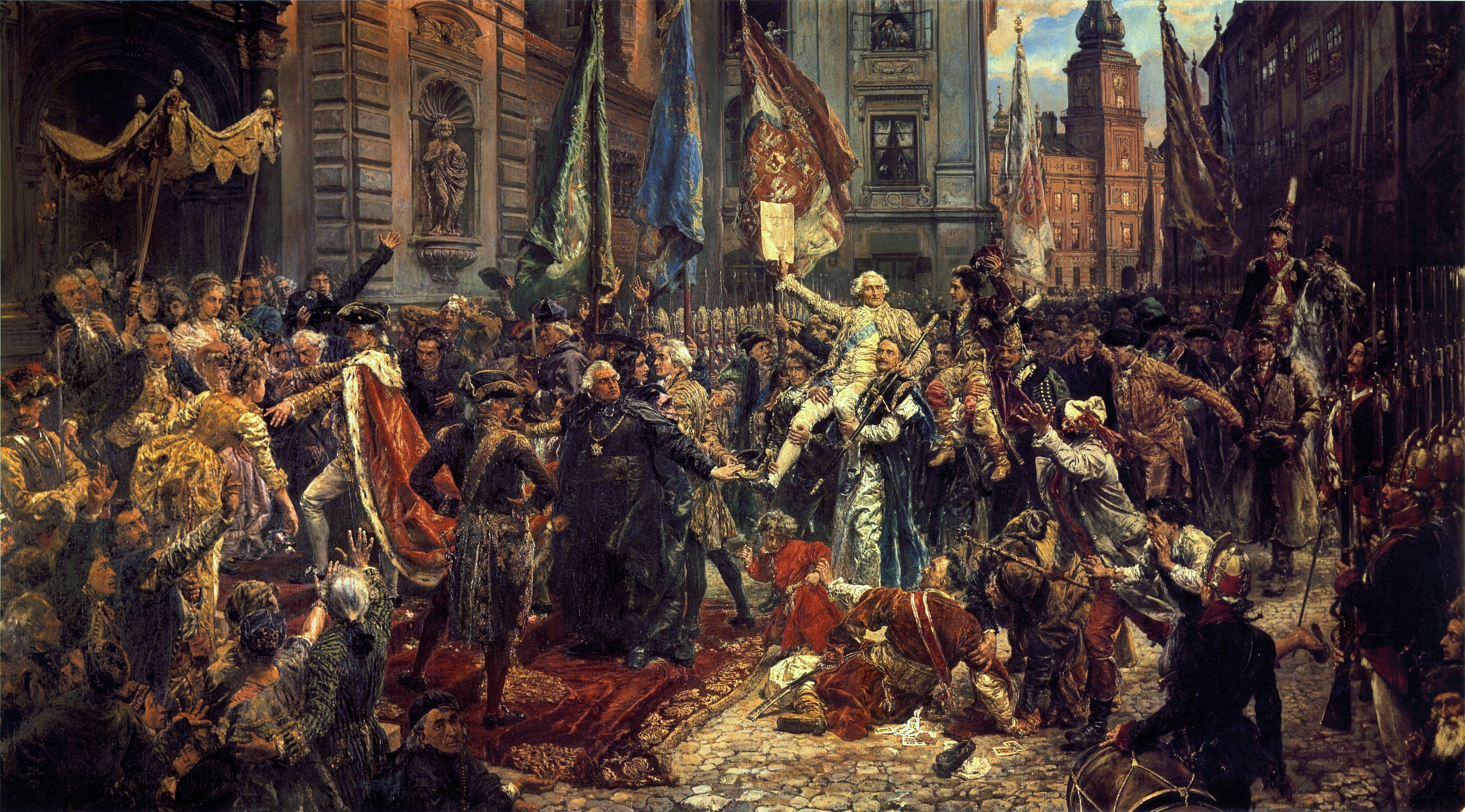
3 May Constitution, by Matejko, 1891. King Stanisław August (left, in regal ermine-trimmed cloak), enters St. John's Cathedral, where Sejm deputies will swear to uphold the new Constitution. In background, Warsaw's Royal Castle, where the Constitution has just been adopted.

The Patriotic Party (Polish: Stronnictwo Patriotyczne), also known as the Patriot Party or, in English, as the Reform Party, was a political movement in the Polish–Lithuanian Commonwealth in the period of the Four-Year Sejm (Great Sejm) of 1788–1792, whose chief achievement was the Constitution of 3 May 1791. The reformers aimed to strengthen the ailing political machinery of the Commonwealth, to bolster its military, and to reduce foreign political influence, particularly that of the Russian Empire. It has been called the first Polish political party, though it had no formal organizational structure. The Party was inspired by the ideals of the French Revolution, and its name, proudly used by themselves, was a tribute to the Dutch Patriots.

The Patriotic Party ceased to exist soon after the adoption of the Constitution when, in the War in Defense of the Constitution, the Targowica Confederates, backed by the Russians, overthrew the reformed government. In 1795 the Third Partition of Poland ended the Commonwealth's independent existence. Many of the movement's leaders emigrated abroad. The party is considered to be the first left-wing party in the history of Poland, given its reformist and egalitarian aspirations, as well as its commitment to national liberation.

== History ==
=== Background ===
The reform movement were responding to the increasingly perilous situation of the Polish–Lithuanian Commonwealth, which only a century earlier had been a major European power and the largest state on the continent. By the early 17th century, the magnates of Poland and Lithuania controlled the state and they ensured that no reforms would be carried out that might weaken their privileged status (the "Golden Freedoms"). The peculiar parliamentary institution of the liberum veto ("free veto"), in effect since 1652, had in principle permitted any Sejm deputy to nullify all the legislation that had been adopted by that Sejm. Thanks to this device, deputies bribed by magnates or foreign powers, or simply content to believe they were living in some kind of "Golden Age", paralyzed the Commonwealth's government for over a century . The government was near collapse, which gave rise to the term "Polish anarchy".

The Enlightenment had gained great influence in certain Commonwealth circles during the reign (1764–95) of its last king, Stanisław August Poniatowski. As a result, the King had proceeded with cautious reforms such as the establishment of fiscal and military ministries and a national customs tariff. However, the idea of reforms in the Commonwealth was viewed with growing suspicion not only by the magnates, but also by neighboring countries, which were content with the Commonwealth's contemporary state of affairs and abhorred the thought of a resurgent and democratic power on their borders.

The first of the three successive 18th-century partitions of Commonwealth territory that would eventually blot Poland from the map of Europe shocked the inhabitants of the Commonwealth, and made it clear to progressively minded individuals that the Commonwealth must either reform or perish. Even before the First Partition, a Sejm deputy had been sent to ask the French philosophes, Gabriel Bonnot de Mably and Jean-Jacques Rousseau, to draw up a tentative constitutions for a new Poland. Mably had submitted his recommendations in 1770–71; Rousseau had finished his (Considerations on the Government of Poland) in 1772, when the First Partition was already underway.

Supported by the more progressive magnates, such as the Czartoryski family, and King Stanisław August Poniatowski, a new wave of reforms was introduced. A major opportunity for reform seemed to present itself during the "Great" or "Four-Year Sejm" of 1788–92, which opened on 6 October 1788. Events in the world now played into the reformers' hands. Poland's neighbors were too occupied with wars – Prussia with France, Russia and Austria with the Ottoman Empire – and with their own internal troubles, to intervene forcibly in Poland. The new alliance between the Polish–Lithuanian Commonwealth and Prussia seemed to provide security against Russian intervention.

=== Reforms and successes ===
The Party was established during the Four-Year Sejm (Great Sejm) of 1788–92 by individuals that sought reforms aimed at bolstering the Polish–Lithuanian Commonwealth, including seeking to reassert Poland's independence from the Russian Empire. Its aim was to draft and pass legislation to fix the ailing Commonwealth. The Party worked to abolish the magnate and Russian dominated Permanent Council, and to enlarge the Polish Army. The Party was modeled after similar organization that recently began operating in revolutionary France.

The party received support from all strata of Polish–Lithuanian society, from societal and political elites, including some magnates, through Piarist Enlightened Catholics, to the radical left. The Party's conservative, or right, wing, led by progressive magnates such as Ignacy Potocki, his brother Stanisław Kostka Potocki and Prince Adam Kazimierz Czartoryski, sought alliance with Prussia and advocated opposing King Stanisław August Poniatowski. The Party's centrists, including Stanisław Małachowski, wished accommodation with the King. The liberal left wing (the Polish Jacobins), led by Hugo Kołłątaj (hence also known as "Kołłątaj's Forge"), looked for support to the people of Warsaw.

The Forge was among the most active and notable groups in the reform movement, and has been said to have acted as the party's political agitators. The Forge's proposals were highly refined; Kołłątaj's "Political Law", which included a proposal for a new constitution, became a major inspiration for the debated new constitution.

In 1790, the party acquired royal support, as the King joined the reformers. During the Four-Year Sejm, the Party secured various reforms such as improvement of the territorial administration, abolishment of the Permanent Council, increase of the army to 100,000 soldiers, and improved and increased taxation, with an income tax on Church and nobles. In its most important achievement, the Party secured adoption of the Constitution of 3 May 1791. The constitution further reformed the executive and legislature, notably abolishing the liberum veto and reintroducing hereditary monarchy to the Commonwealth. The Constitution has been described as one of the first modern constitutions, and one of the first attempts, outside France, to bring the ideals of the Age of Enlightenment to life. After the Constitution was passed, the Party formed the Society of Friends of the Government Ordinance (Zgromadzenie Przyjaciół Konstytucji Rządowej), a political club, to defend the reforms already enacted and to promote further, including economic, ones. The Party and the Society are often referred to as the first Polish political party.

In 1791–1792, the Party was supported by a newspaper, Gazeta Narodowa i Obca (National and Foreign Gazette), which functioned as the Party's informal press outlet.

=== Opposition and failure ===
The opponents to the Patriotic Party were mostly grouped in the Hetmans' Party (Stronnictwo hetmańskie), and included Hetmans Stanisław Szczęsny Potocki, Franciszek Ksawery Branicki and Seweryn Rzewuski. They formed the Targowica Confederation in defense of the traditional Golden Liberties and the Cardinal Laws, and called on the Russian Empire for assistance. Empress Catherine II of Russia readily obliged, as she saw the Constitution as a threat to Russian influence in the Commonwealth, and a possible long-term danger to absolute monarchy in Russia itself.

After the War in Defense of the Constitution, which was won by the Confederates and their Russian allies, the Patriotic Party's principal leaders – Kołłątaj, Potocki, Małachowski – emigrated abroad, where they prepared the ground for the Kościuszko Uprising of 1794. The subsequent failure of that Uprising in turn led to the Third Partition of Poland, ending the existence of the Commonwealth. The Patriotic Party's attempts to reform the Commonwealth thus ultimately brought about its total demise.

== Main members ==
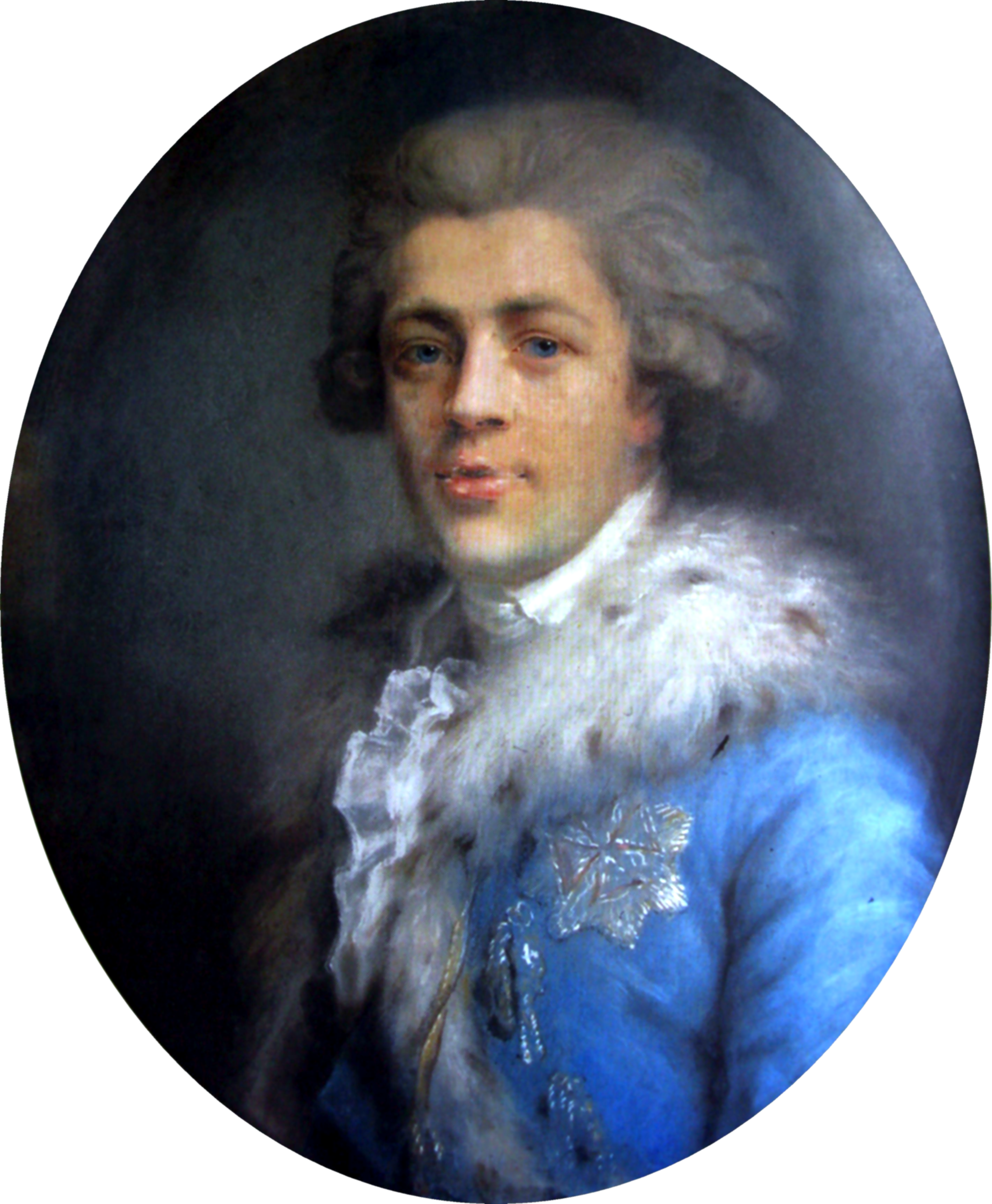
Ignacy Potocki

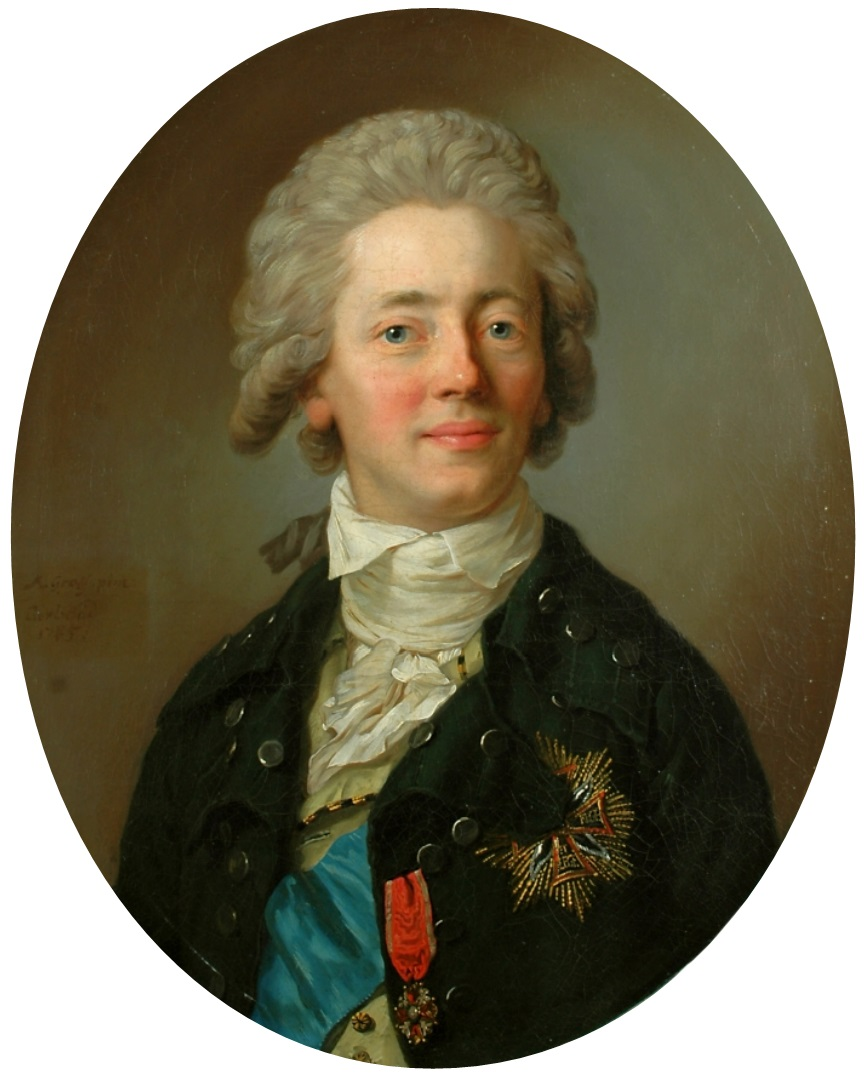
Stanisław Kostka Potocki

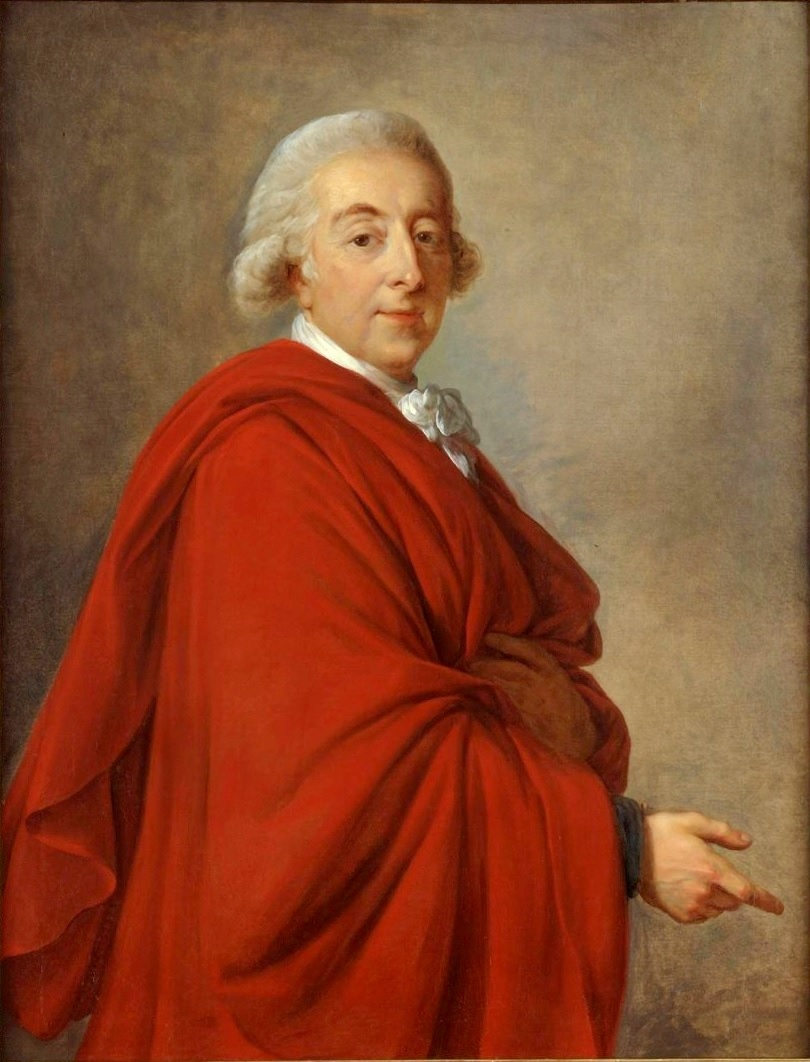
Adam Kazimierz Czartoryski

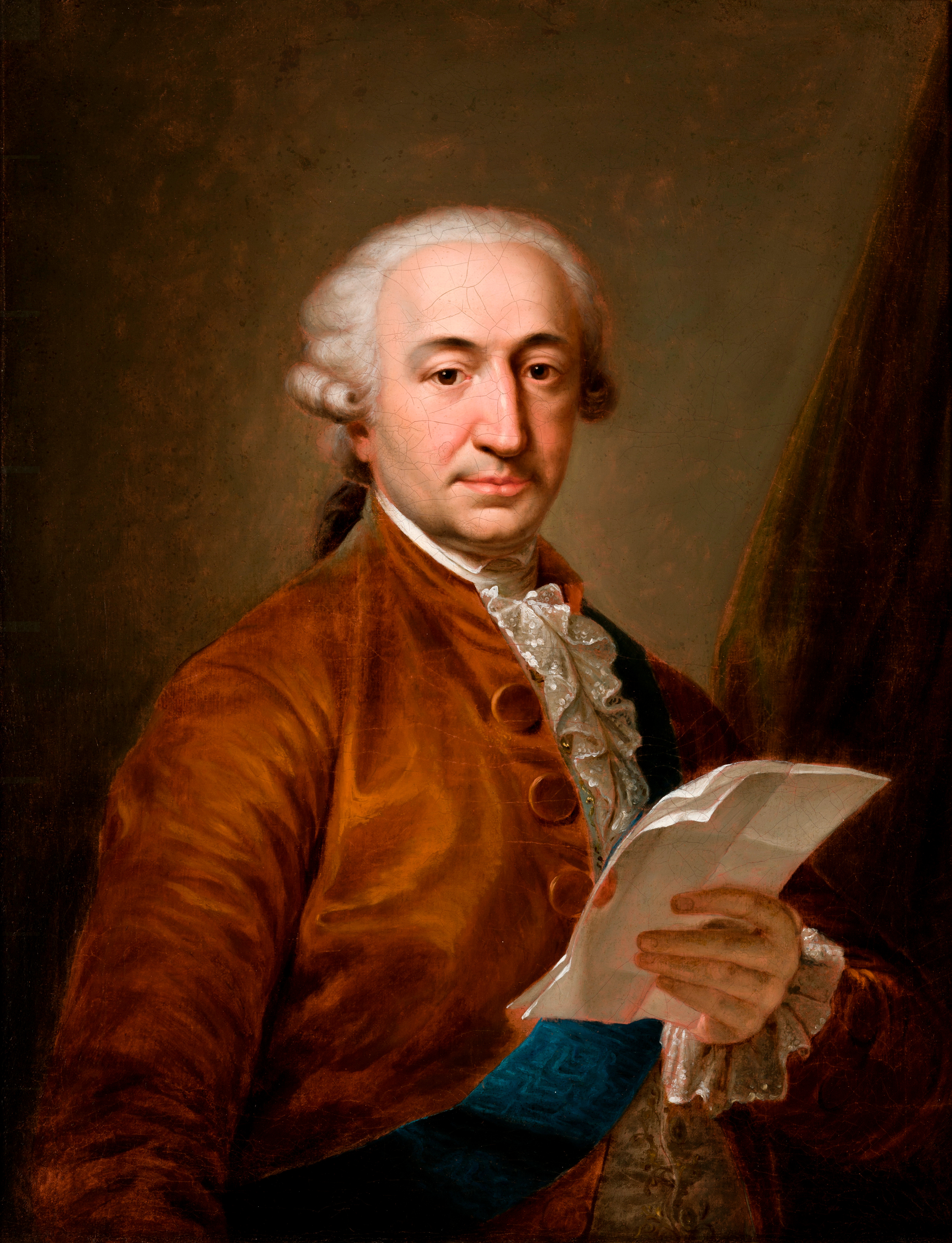
Stanisław Małachowski

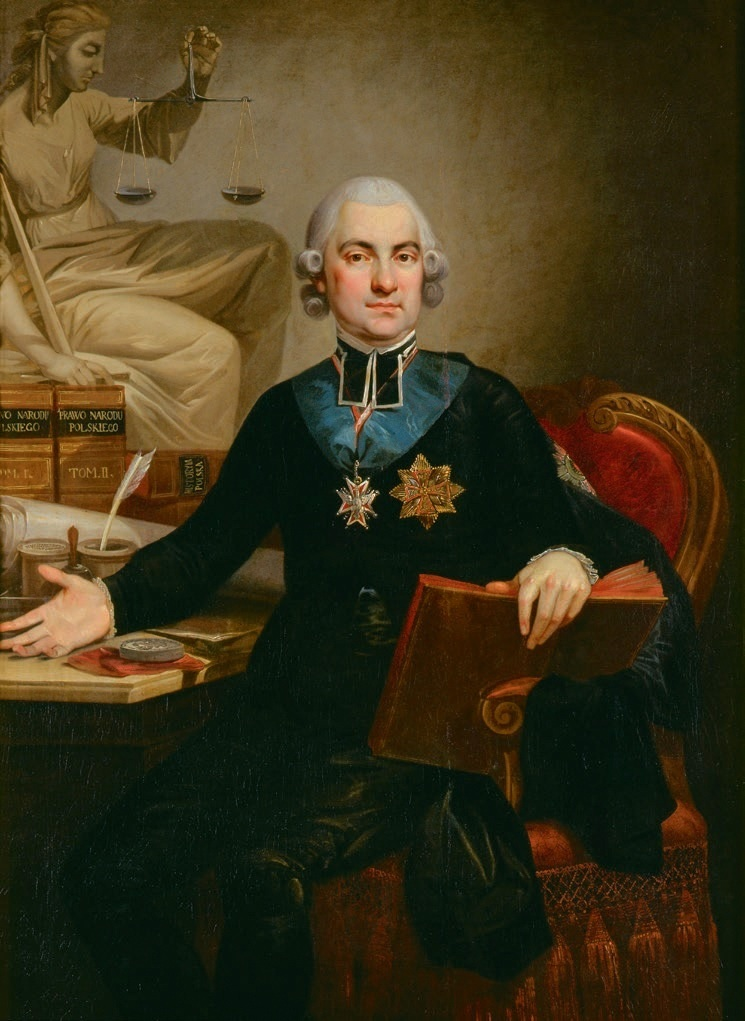
Hugo Kołłątaj

== See also ==
- Execution movement
- Zamoyski Code
