= Hugo Kołłątaj =

Polish historian and philosopher (1750–1812)

- Deputy Chancellor of the Crown
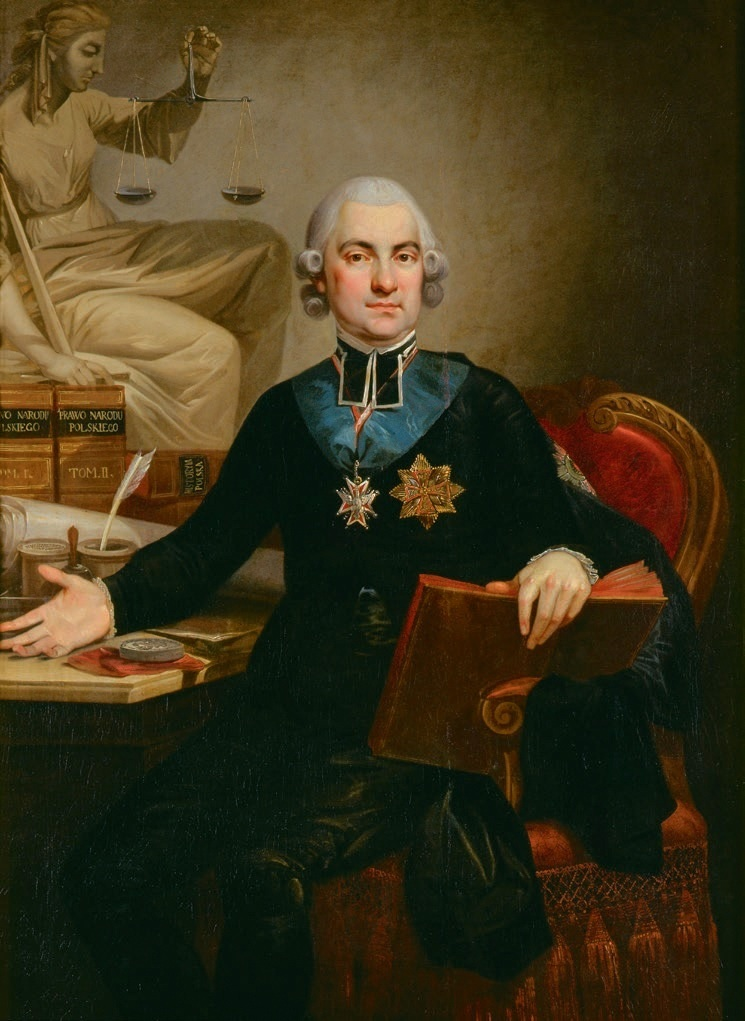
- Portrait by Józef Peszka
- Coat of arms: Kotwica
- Born: 1 April 1750; Dederkały Wielkie, Wołyń, Polish–Lithuanian Commonwealth
- Died: 28 February 1812 (aged 61); Warsaw, Duchy of Warsaw
- Buried: Powązki Cemetery
- Noble family: Kołłątaj
- Father: Antoni Kołłątaj
- Mother: Marianna Mierzeńska
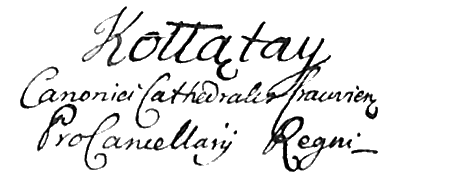
- Signature

Philosophical work
- Era: Age of Enlightenment
- Region: Western philosophy Polish philosophy
- School: Polish Enlightenment; Kołłątaj's Forge
- Institutions: Warsaw Society of Friends of Learning
- Main interests: Pedagogy, history, political philosophy, geology, mineralogy, anthropology
- Notable works: A Few Anonymous Letters; 3rd May Constitution; Proclamation of Połaniec

Hugo Stumberg Kołłątaj, also spelled Kołłątay (1 April 1750 – 28 February 1812), was a prominent Polish constitutional reformer and educationalist, and one of the most prominent figures of the Polish Enlightenment. He served as Deputy Chancellor of the Crown between 1791–1792. He was a Catholic priest, social and political activist, political thinker, historian, philosopher, and polymath.

== Biography ==
=== Early life ===
Hugo Kołłątaj was born on 1 April 1750 in Dederkały Wielkie (now in Western Ukraine) in Volhynia into a family of Polish nobility. Soon after, his family moved to Nieciesławice, near Sandomierz, where he spent his childhood. He attended school in Pińczów. He began his studies at the Kraków Academy, subsequently, Jagiellonian University, where he studied law and gained a doctorate. Afterwards, around 1775 he took holy orders. He studied in Vienna and Italy (Naples and Rome), where he would have encountered Enlightenment philosophy. He is thought to have gained two further doctorates abroad in philosophy and theology.

Returning to Poland, he became a canon of Kraków, and parish priest of Krzyżanowice Dolne and Tuczępy. He was active in the Commission of National Education and the Society for Elementary Books, where he took a prominent role in the development of the national network of schools. He spent two years in Warsaw, but returned to Kraków, where he reformed the Kraków Academy, on whose board he sat from 1777, and whose rector he was between 1783–1786. The reform of the Academy was very substantial. It established innovative standards. Notably, he substituted Polish for Latin, which till then was used for lectures. The removal of Latin in favour of a national language in higher education was then still uncommon in Europe. The reform proved so controversial that his political enemies plotted successfully to have him temporarily removed from Kraków in 1781, on grounds of corruption and immorality. Although in 1782 the decision was rescinded.

=== Reforms of the Great Sejm ===
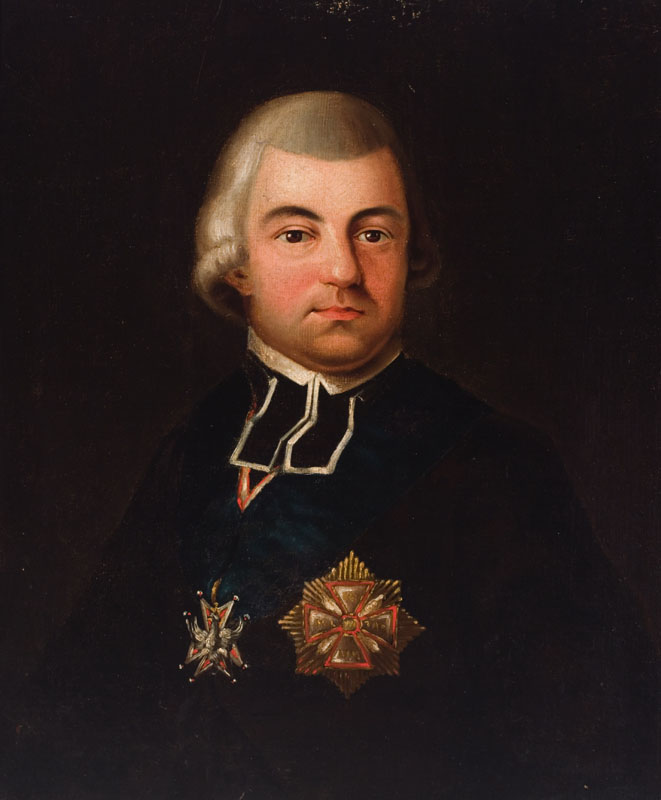
Kołłątaj

Kołłątaj was also active politically. In 1786 he assumed the office of the Referendary of Lithuania, and moved to Warsaw. He became prominent in the reform movement, heading an informal group that was on the radical wing of the Patriotic Party, and labelled by their political enemies as "Kołłątaj's Forge". As leader of the Patriotic Party during the Great Sejm, he set out its programme in his Several Anonymous Letters to Stanisław Małachowski (1788–1789) and in his essay, The Political Law of the Polish Nation (1790). In his works he advocated a republican-tinged constitutional reform and the need for other social reforms. Among the goals he pursued were the strengthening of the king's constitutional position, a larger national army, abolition of the liberum veto, the introduction of universal taxation, and the emancipation of both townspeople and the peasantry. An organiser of the townspeople's movement, he edited a text that demanded reform and which was delivered to the king during the Black Procession of 1789.

Kołłątaj co-authored the Constitution of 3 May 1791. He also founded the Friends of the Constitution to assist in the document's implementation. In 1786 he received the Order of Saint Stanislaus and in 1791, the Order of the White Eagle. In 1791–92 he served as Crown Vice Chancellor (Podkanclerzy Koronny).

During the Polish-Russian war that broke out over the Constitution of 3 May 1791, Kołłątaj, along with other royal advisers, persuaded King Stanisław August, himself a co-author of the Constitution, to seek a compromise with their opponents and to join the Targowica Confederation that had been formed to bring down the Constitution. However, in 1792, when the Confederates' won, Kołłątaj emigrated to Leipzig and Dresden, where in 1793 he wrote, with Ignacy Potocki, an essay entitled, On the Adoption and Fall of the Polish Constitution of 3 May.

=== Exile and final years ===
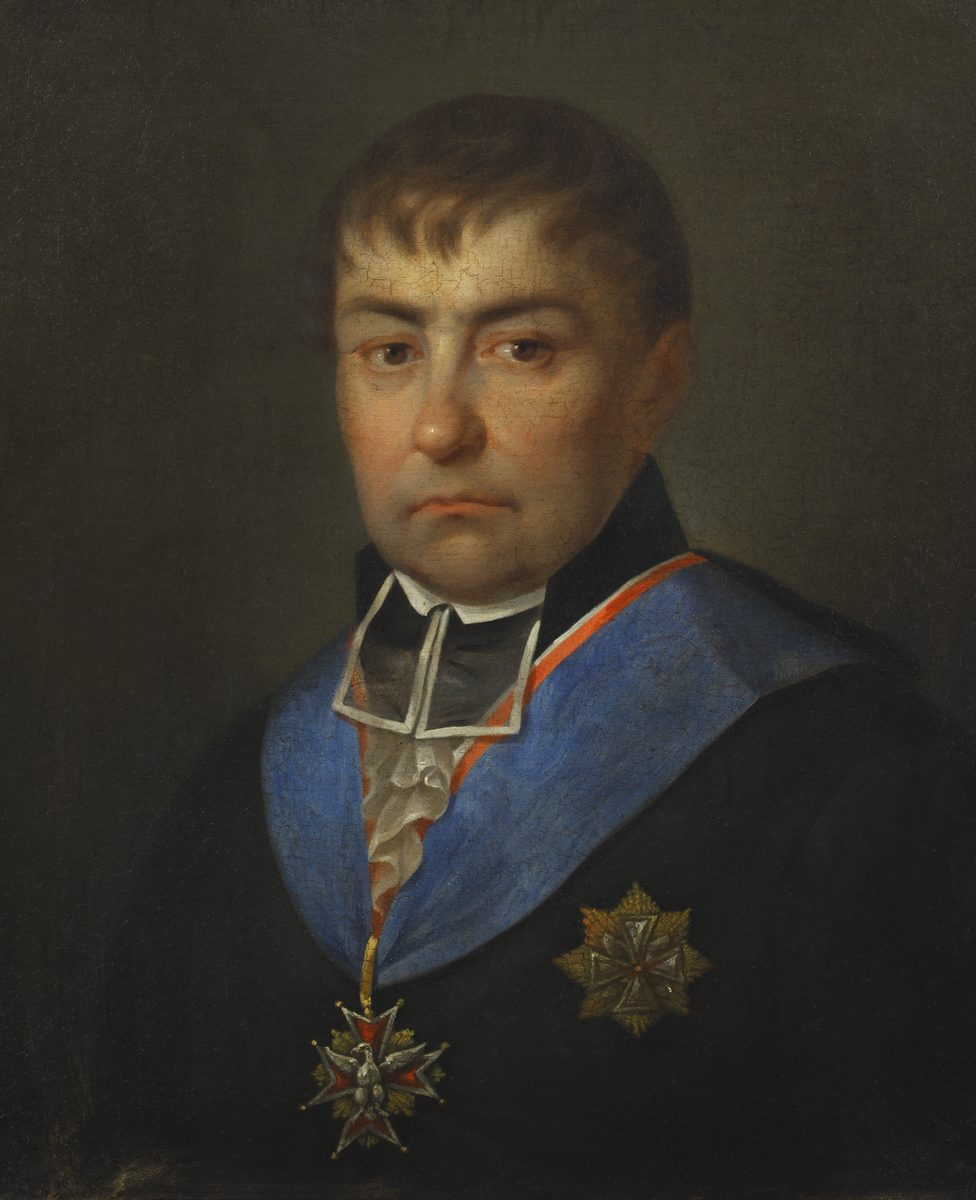
Kołłątaj, by Jan Pfeiffer, 1810

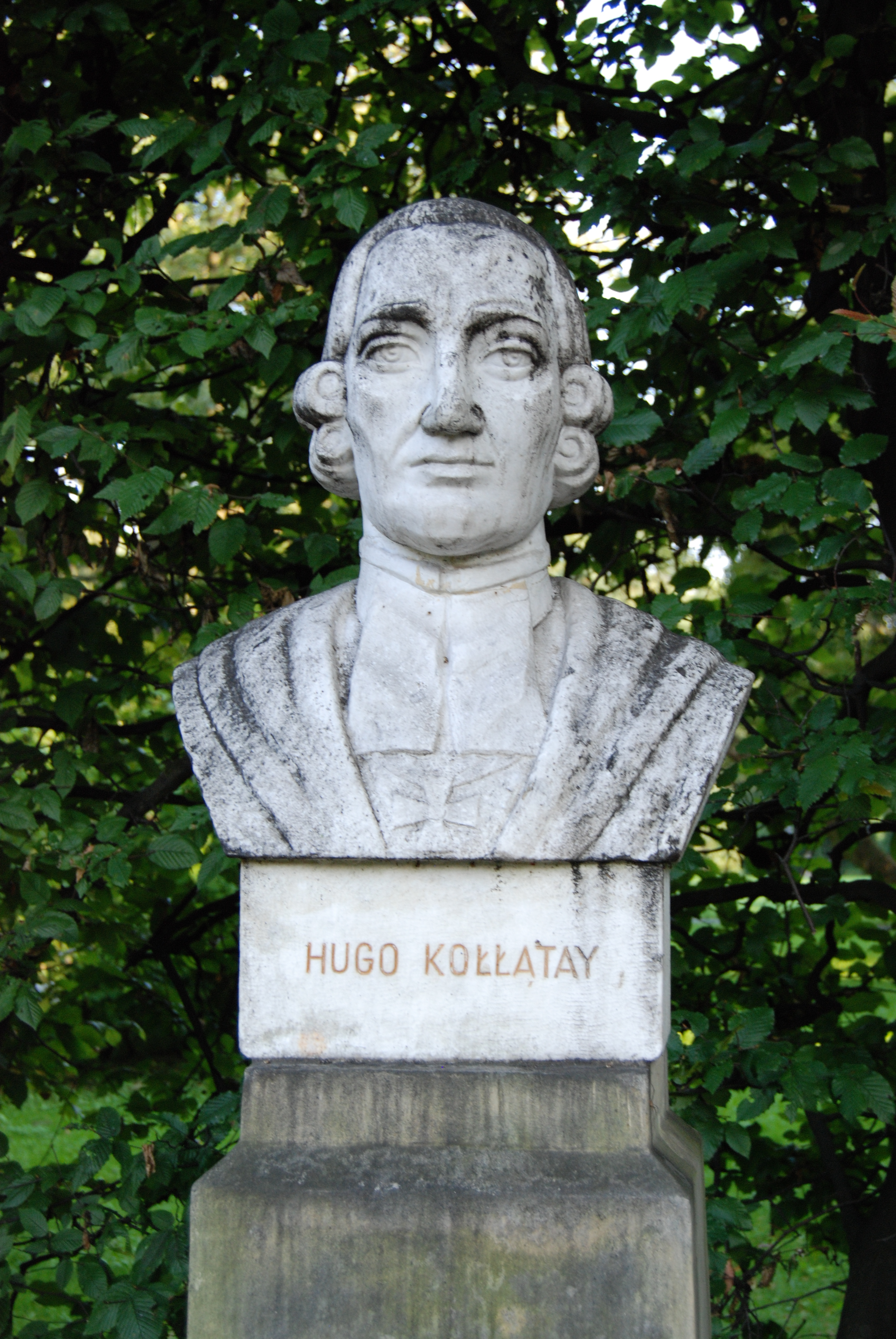
Kołłątaj, Jordan Park, Kraków

In exile, his political views became more radical and he became involved with the preparation for an insurrection. In 1794 he took part in the Kościuszko Uprising, contributing to its Uprising Act on 24 March 1794 and to the Połaniec Manifesto on 7 May 1794. He headed the Supreme National Council's Treasury Department, and backed the Uprising's wing of Polish Jacobins. After the suppression of the Uprising in the same year, Kołłątaj was imprisoned by the Austrians until 1802. In 1805, with Tadeusz Czacki, he organized the Krzemieniec Lyceum in Volhynia. In 1807, after the creation of the Duchy of Warsaw, he was initially involved in its government, but was soon excluded from it through the intrigues of political opponents, and soon afterwards, was interned and imprisoned by the Russian authorities until 1808. On his release, he found himself barred from public office. Despite that, he sought to present a programme for rebuilding and developing Poland in his "Remarks on the Present Position of That Part of the Polish Lands that, since the Treaty of Tilsit, have come to be called the Duchy of Warsaw" (1809). In 1809 he became a member of the Warsaw Society of Friends of Learning. In the years 1809–1810, he was once again involved with the Kraków Academy, bringing it back from its temporarily Germanised form.

In his The Physico-Moral Order (1811), Kołłątaj sought to create a socio-ethical system emphasizing the equality of all people, based on the physiocratic idea of a "physico-moral order". Steeped in the natural sciences, geology and mineralogy in particular, he went on to write A Critical Analysis of Historical Principles regarding the Origins of Humankind, published posthumously in 1842. In this work, he put forward the first Polish presentation of ideas of social evolution based on geological concepts. This work is also seen as an important contribution to cultural anthropology. In The State of Education in Poland in the Final Years of the Reign of Augustus III, published posthumously in 1841, he argued against the Jesuit domination of education and presented a study of the history of education.

He died on 28 February 1812, "forgotten and abandoned" by his contemporaries. He was buried in the Powązki Cemetery.

== Remembrance ==
Despite his lonely death, Kołłątaj became an influence on many subsequent reformers and is now recognized as one of the key figures of the Enlightenment in Poland, and "one of the greatest minds of his epoch". He is one of the figures immortalized in Jan Matejko's 1891 painting, Constitution of 3 May 1791.

Several learned institutions in Poland are named in Hugo Kołłątaj's honour, including the Agricultural University of Kraków of which he was co-founder and patron.

== See also ==
- History of philosophy in Poland – Enlightenment
- Piotr Skarga
- Stanisław Staszic
- List of Poles
