= Great Sejm =

1788–1792 Polish-Lithuanian parliament

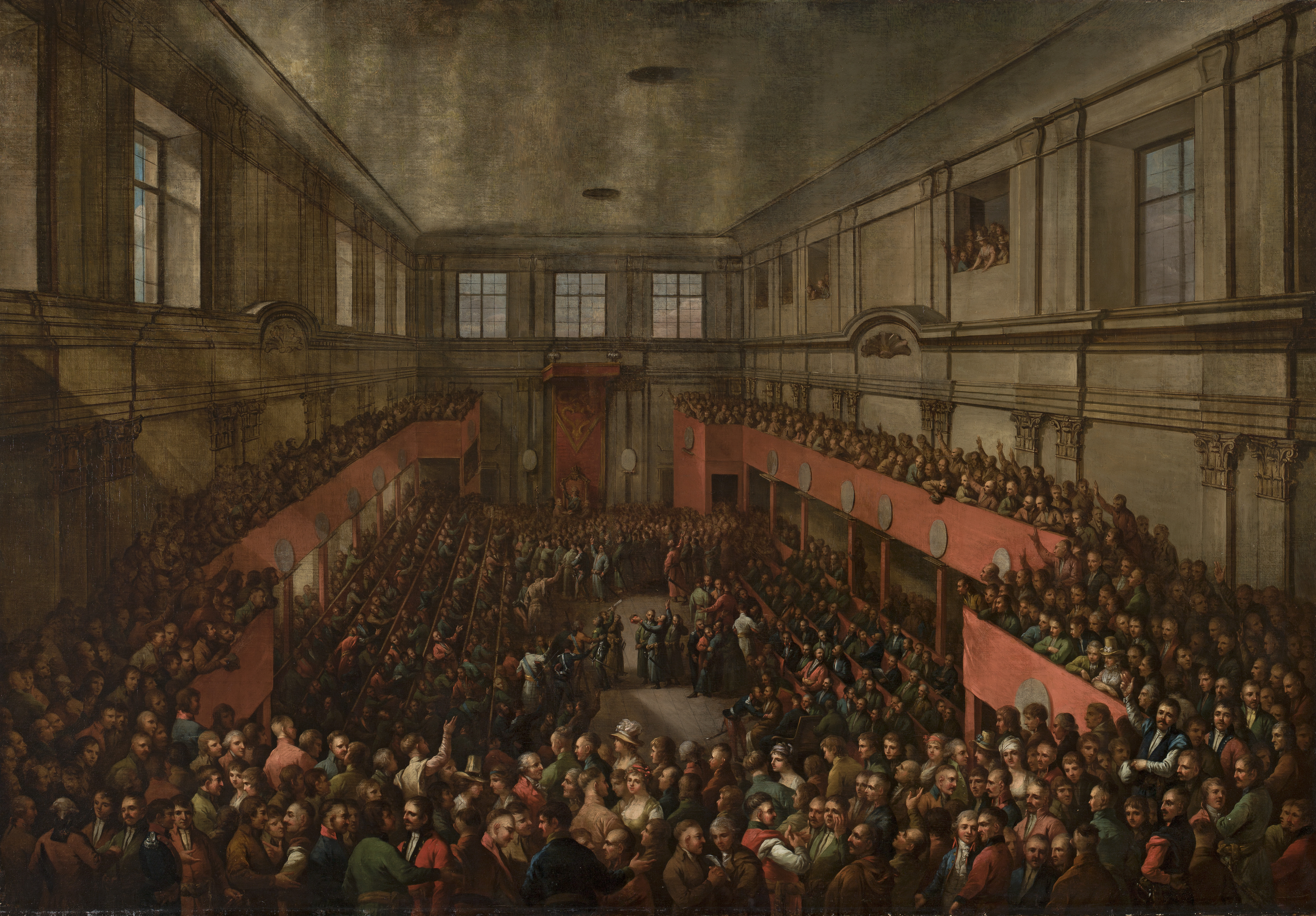
The Great Sejm adopts the Constitution of 3 May 1791 at the Royal Castle in Warsaw.

The Great Sejm, also known as the Four-Year Sejm (Polish: Sejm Wielki or Sejm Czteroletni; Lithuanian: Didysis seimas or Ketverių metų seimas) was a Sejm (parliament) of the Polish–Lithuanian Commonwealth that was held in Warsaw between 1788 and 1792. Its principal aim became to restore sovereignty to, and reform, the Commonwealth politically and economically.

The Sejm's great achievement was the adoption of the Constitution of 3 May 1791, often described as Europe's first modern written national constitution, and the world's second, after the United States Constitution. The Polish Constitution was designed to redress long-standing political defects of the federative Polish-Lithuanian Commonwealth and its system of Golden Liberties. The Constitution introduced political equality between townspeople and nobility and placed the peasants under the protection of the government, thus mitigating the worst abuses of serfdom. The Constitution abolished pernicious parliamentary institutions such as the liberum veto, which at one time had placed a sejm at the mercy of any deputy who might choose, or be bribed by an interest or foreign power, to undo all the legislation that had been passed by that sejm. The 3 May Constitution sought to supplant the existing anarchy engineered by some of the country's reactionary magnates, with a more egalitarian and democratic constitutional monarchy.

The reforms instituted by the Great Sejm and the Constitution of 3 May 1791 were undone by the Targowica Confederation and the intervention of the Russian Empire at the invitation of the Targowica Confederates.

== Origins ==
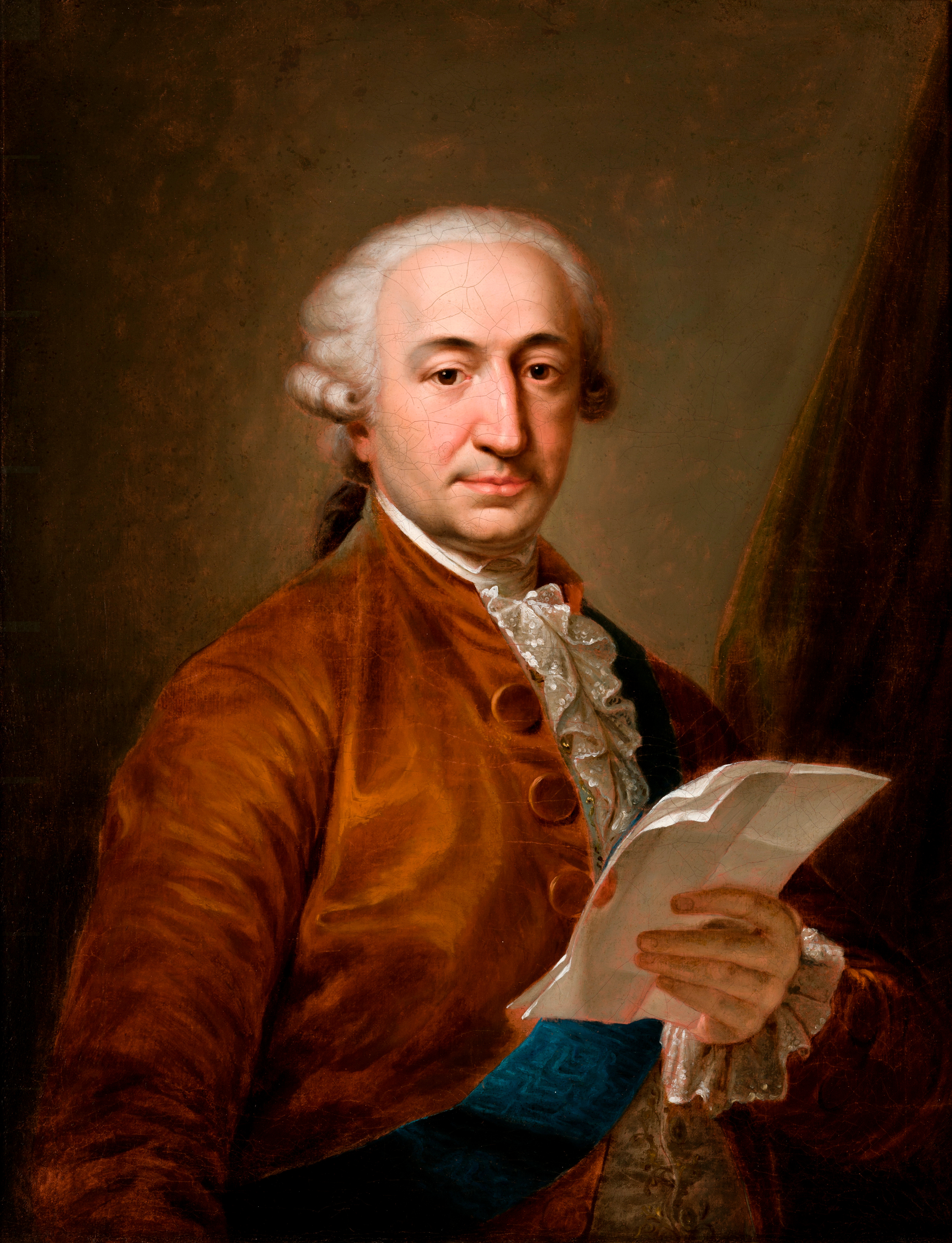
Stanisław Małachowski, Marshal of the Great Sejm

The reforms of the Great Sejm responded to the increasingly perilous situation of the Polish–Lithuanian Commonwealth, which was only a century earlier a major European power and the largest state on the continent. By the 18th century the Commonwealth's state machinery became increasingly dysfunctional; the government was near collapse, giving rise to the term "Polish anarchy", and the country was managed by provincial assemblies and magnates. Many historians hold that a major cause of the Commonwealth's downfall was the peculiar parliamentary institution of the liberum veto ("free veto"), which since 1652 had in principle permitted any Sejm deputy to nullify all the legislation that had been adopted by that Sejm. By the early 18th century, the magnates of Poland and Lithuania controlled the state – or rather, they managed to ensure that no reforms would be carried out that might weaken their privileged status (the "Golden Freedoms"). The matters were not helped by the inefficient monarchs elected to the Commonwealth throne around the start of the 18th century, nor by neighboring countries, which were content with the deteriorated state of the Commonwealth's affairs and abhorred the thought of a resurgent and democratic power on their borders.

The Enlightenment European cultural movement had gained great influence in certain Commonwealth circles during the reign of its last king, Stanisław August Poniatowski (1764–95), which roughly coincided with the Enlightenment in Poland. In 1772, the First Partition of Poland, the earliest of the three successive 18th-century partitions of Commonwealth territory that eventually removed Poland from the map of Europe, shocked the inhabitants of the Commonwealth, and made it clear to progressive minds that the Commonwealth must either reform or perish. In the last three decades preceding the Great Sejm, there was a rising interest among progressive thinkers in constitutional reform. Even before the First Partition, a Polish noble, Michał Wielhorski, an envoy of the Bar Confederation, had been sent to ask the French philosophes Gabriel Bonnot de Mably and Jean-Jacques Rousseau to offer suggestions on a new constitution for a new Poland. Mably had submitted his recommendations (The Government and Laws of Poland) in 1770–1771; Rousseau had finished his Considerations on the Government of Poland in 1772, when the First Partition was already underway. Notable works advocating the need to reform and presenting specific solutions were published in the Commonwealth itself by Polish-Lithuanian thinkers such as:

- Stanisław Konarski, founder of the Collegium Nobilium (On the Effective Conduct of Debates in Ordinary Sejms, 1761–1763);
- Józef Wybicki, composer of the Polish National Anthem (Political Thoughts on Civil Liberties, 1775, Patriotic Letters, 1778–1778);
- Hugo Kołłątaj, head of the Kołłątaj's Forge party (Anonymous Letters to Stanisław Małachowski, 1788–1789, The Political Law of the Polish Nation, 1790); and
- Stanisław Staszic (Remarks on the Life of Jan Zamoyski, 1787).

Also seen as crucial to giving the upcoming reforms their moral and political support were Ignacy Krasicki's satires of the Great Sejm era.

== Proceedings ==
=== 1789–90 ===
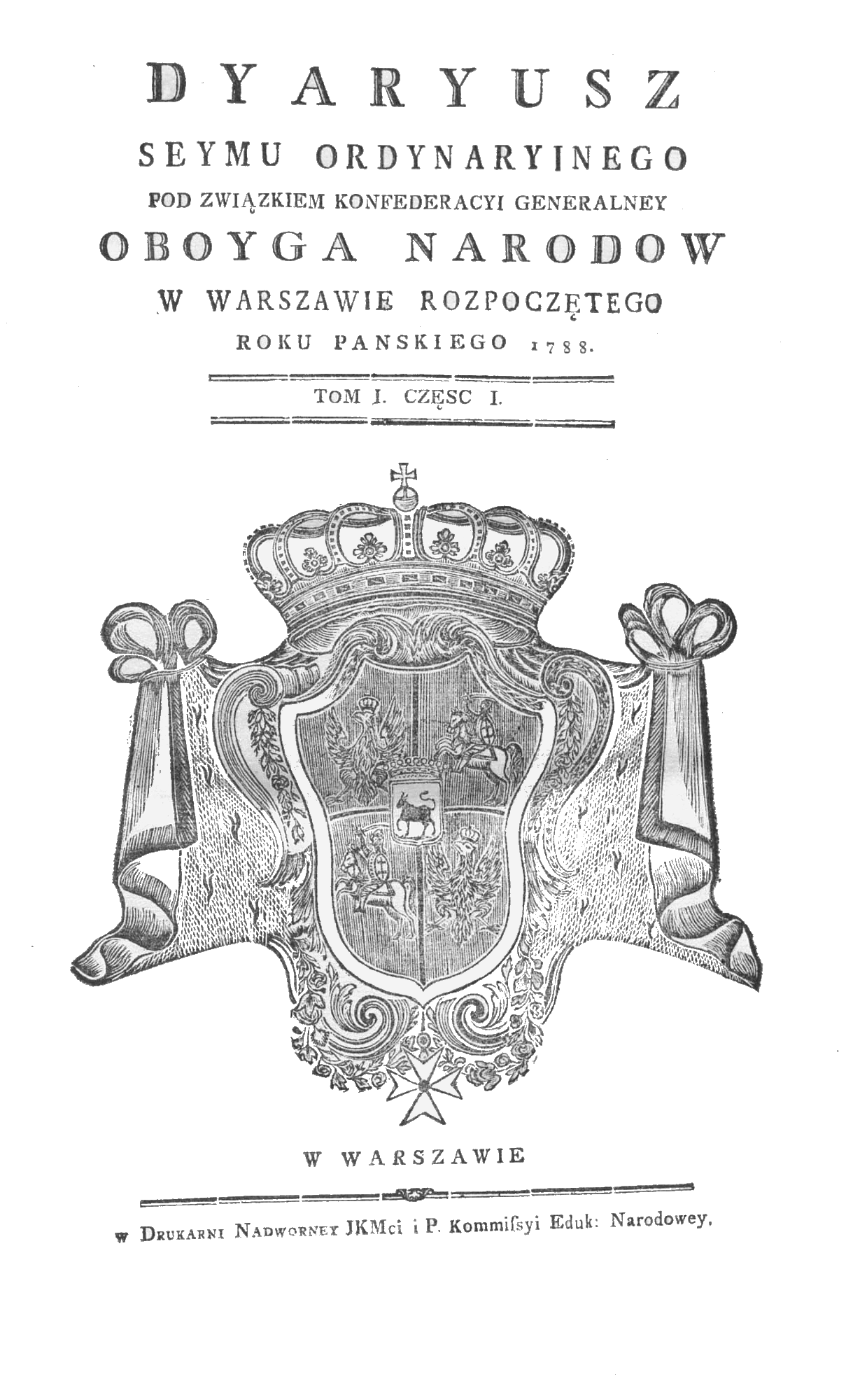
Great Sejm official diary

A major opportunity for reform seemed to present itself during the sejm of 1788–92, which opened on 6 October 1788 with 181 deputies, and from 1790 – in the words of the 3 May Constitution's preamble – met "in dual number", when 171 newly elected Sejm deputies joined the earlier-established Sejm. On its second day the Sejm transformed itself into a confederated sejm to make it immune to the threat of the liberum veto. Russian tsarina Catherine the Great had issued the approval for the sejm confederation a while ago, at a point she was considering that the successful conclusion of this Sejm may be necessary if Russia would need Polish aid in the fight against the Ottoman Empire. Stanisław Małachowski, a statesman respected both by most factions, was elected as the Marshal of the Sejm.

Many supporters of the reforms were gathered in the Patriotic Party. This group received support from all strata of Polish-Lithuanian society, from societal and political elites, including some aristocratic magnates, through Piarist and Enlightened Catholics, to the radical left. The Party's conservative, or right, wing, led by progressive magnates such as Ignacy Potocki, his brother Stanisław Kostka Potocki and Prince Adam Kazimierz Czartoryski, sought alliance with Prussia and advocated opposing King Poniatowski. The Patriotic Party's centrists, including Stanisław Małachowski, wished accommodation with the King. The liberal left wing (the Polish Jacobins), led by Hugo Kołłątaj (hence also known as "Kołłątaj's Forge"), looked for support to the people of Warsaw. While King Poniatowski also supported some reforms, he was initially not allied with this faction, represented by Potocki, who preferred a republican form of a government.

Events in the world appeared to play into the reformers' hands. Poland's neighbors were too occupied with wars to intervene forcibly in Poland, with Russia and Austria engaged in hostilities with the Ottoman Empire (the Russo-Turkish War and the Austro-Turkish War); the Russians also found themselves fighting Sweden (the Russo-Swedish War). At first, King Poniatowski and some reformers hoped to gain Russian support for the reforms; they attempted to draw Poland into the Austro-Russian alliance, seeing a war with the Ottomans as an opportunity to strengthen the Commonwealth. Due to internal Russian politics, this plan was not implemented. Spurned by Russia, Poland turned to another potential ally, the Triple Alliance, represented on the Polish diplomatic scene primarily by the Kingdom of Prussia. This line of reasoning gained support from Polish politicians such as Ignacy Potocki and Adam Kazimierz Czartoryski. With the new Polish-Prussian alliance seeming to provide security against Russian intervention, King Poniatowski drew closer to leaders of the reform-minded Patriotic Party. This alliance was also helped as the 1790 elections were more supportive of the royal faction then Potocki's; and the conservative faction gained enough new seats to threaten the reformers if they were to stay divided. With the mediation of Scipione Piattoli, Potocki and Poniatowski begun to reach a consensus on a more constitutional monarchy approach, and started to draft a constitutional document.

Overall, the first two years of the Sejm passed with few major reforms, and it was the second half of the Sejm duration that brought major changes.

=== 1791–92 ===
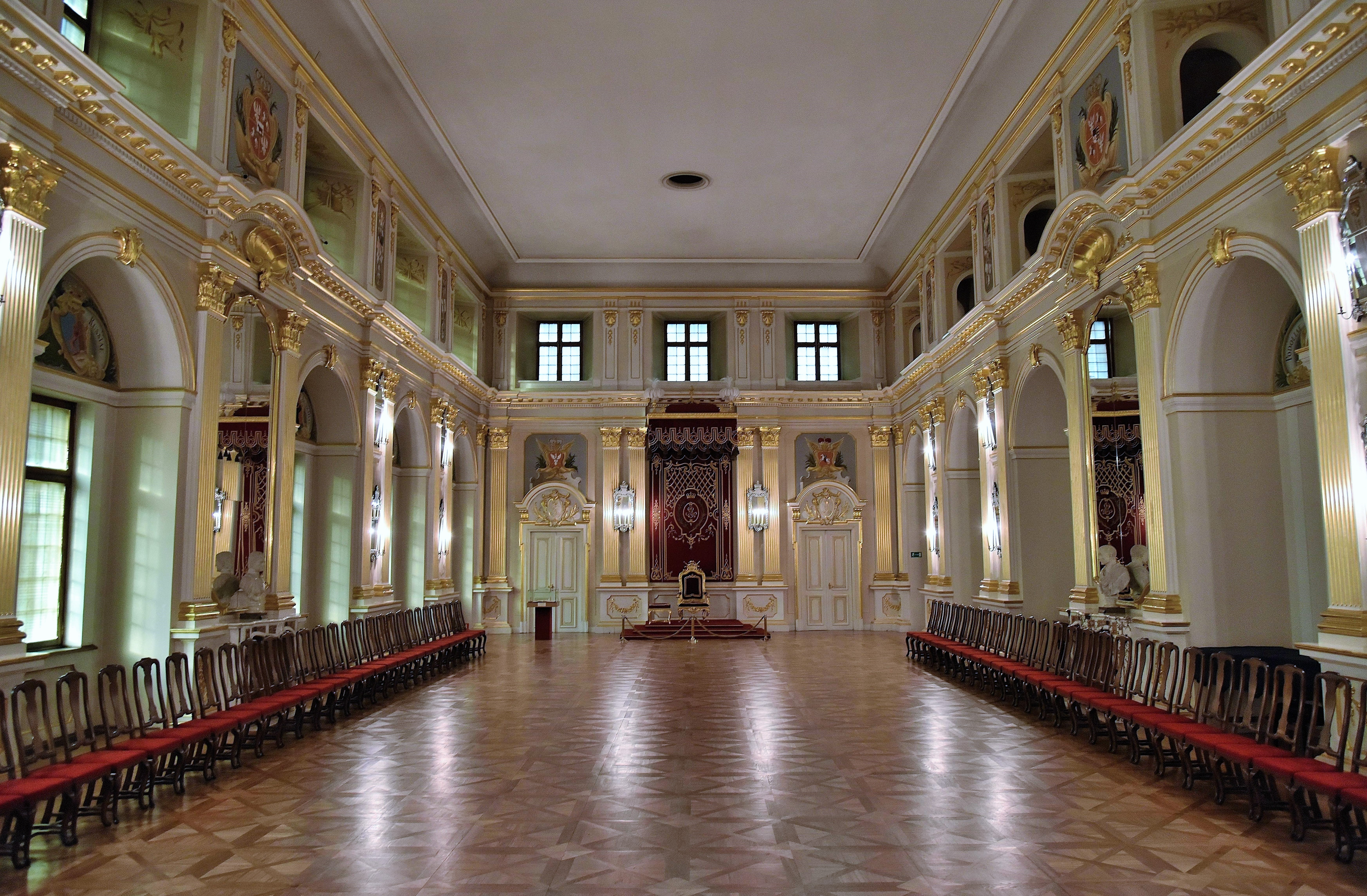
Royal Castle Senate Chamber, where the May 3 Constitution was adopted

The elections of autumn 1790 resulted in a new group of deputies joining those already elected. A second Marshal of the Sejm was elected (Kazimierz Nestor Sapieha). As Małachowski was seen as associated with the reformers, Sapieha was initially seen as a conservative, although he would later switch sides and join the reformers. The doubled number of deputies exceeded the capacity of the parliament chambers, and not all of the deputies could secure a seat; public interest also grew and the entire building and the observation galleries were often overcrowded.

While the Sejm comprised representatives only of the nobility and clergy, the reformers were supported by the burghers (townspeople), who in the Autumn of 1789 organized a Black Procession, demonstrating their desire to be part of the political process. Taking a cue from similar events in France, and with the fear that if burghers' demands were not met, their peaceful protests could turn violent, the Sejm on 18 April 1791 adopted a law addressing the status of the cities and the rights of the burghers (the Free Royal Cities Act). Together with the legislation on the voting rights (the Act on Sejmiks of 24 March 1791), it became incorporated into the final constitution.

The new Constitution had been drafted by the king, with contributions from others, including Ignacy Potocki and Hugo Kołłątaj. The king is credited with authoring the general provisions, and Kołłątaj, with giving the work its final shape. Poniatowski aimed for a constitutional monarchy similar to the one in England, with strong central government based upon a strong monarch. Potocki wanted to make the parliament (Sejm) the most powerful of the state's institutions, and Kołłątaj, for a "gentle" social revolution, enfranchising other classes in addition to the till-then dominant nobility, but doing so without a violent overthrow of the old order.

Reforms were opposed by conservative elements, including the Hetmans' Party. The reform's advocates, threatened with violence from their opponents, managed to move debate on the new constitution forward by two days from the original 5 May, while many opposed deputies were still away on Easter recess. The ensuing debate and adoption of the Constitution of 3 May took place in a quasi-coup d'état: recall notices were not sent to known opponents of reform, while many pro-reform deputies arrived early and in secret, and the royal guard were positioned about the Royal Castle, where the Sejm was gathered, to prevent Russian supporters from disrupting the proceedings. On 3 May the Sejm met with only 182 members present, about a half of its "dual" number (or a third, if one was to count all individuals eligible to take part in the proceedings, including the Senate and the king^{[a]}). The bill was read out and adopted overwhelmingly, to the enthusiasm of the crowds gathered outside.

The work of the Great Sejm did not end with the passing of the Constitution. The Sejm continued to debate and pass legislation building on and clarifying that document. Among the most notable acts passed after the 3 May was the Deklaracja Stanów Zgromadzonych (Declaration of the Assembled Estates) of 5 May 1791, confirming the Government Act adopted two days earlier, and the Zaręczenie Wzajemne Obojga Narodów (Reciprocal Guarantee of Two Nations, i.e., of the Crown of Poland and the Grand Duchy of Lithuania) of 22 October 1791, affirming the unity and indivisibility of Poland and the Grand Duchy within a single state, and their equal representation in state-governing bodies. The Mutual Declaration strengthened the Polish-Lithuanian union, while keeping many federal aspects of the state intact.

The Sejm was disbanded on 29 May 1792. On that day, soon after learning that the Russian army had invaded Poland, the Sejm gave the commander-in-chief position to the king, and voted to end the session.

== Aftermath ==
Soon afterwards, the Friends of the Constitution, regarded as the first Polish political party, and including many participants of the Great Sejm, was formed to defend the reforms already enacted and to promote further ones. The response to the new Constitution was less enthusiastic in the provinces, where the Hetmans' Party exerted stronger influence. The Great Sejm's reforms were brought down by the Targowica Confederation and the intervention of the Russian Empire. On 23 November 1793 the Grodno Sejm annulled all the enactments of the Great Sejm, including the Constitution of 3 May 1791.

== See also ==
- List of deputies of the Great Sejm

== Notes ==
a A website dedicated to the genealogy of the Great Sejm participants, maintained by Maria Minakowska, lists 484 participants. Those include the king, members of the Senate, and deputies elected in 1788 and 1790.
