= Piattoli =

Piattoli is a surname. Notable people with the surname include:

- Anna Bacherini Piattoli (1720–1788), Italian painter
- Gaetano Piattoli (1703–c. 1770), Italian painter
- Giuseppe Piattoli the Younger (1748-1834), Italian painter and engraver
- Scipione Piattoli (1749–1809), Italian Catholic priest
