= Constitution of 3 May 1791 (painting) =

1891 painting by Jan Matejko

The Constitution of 3 May 1791
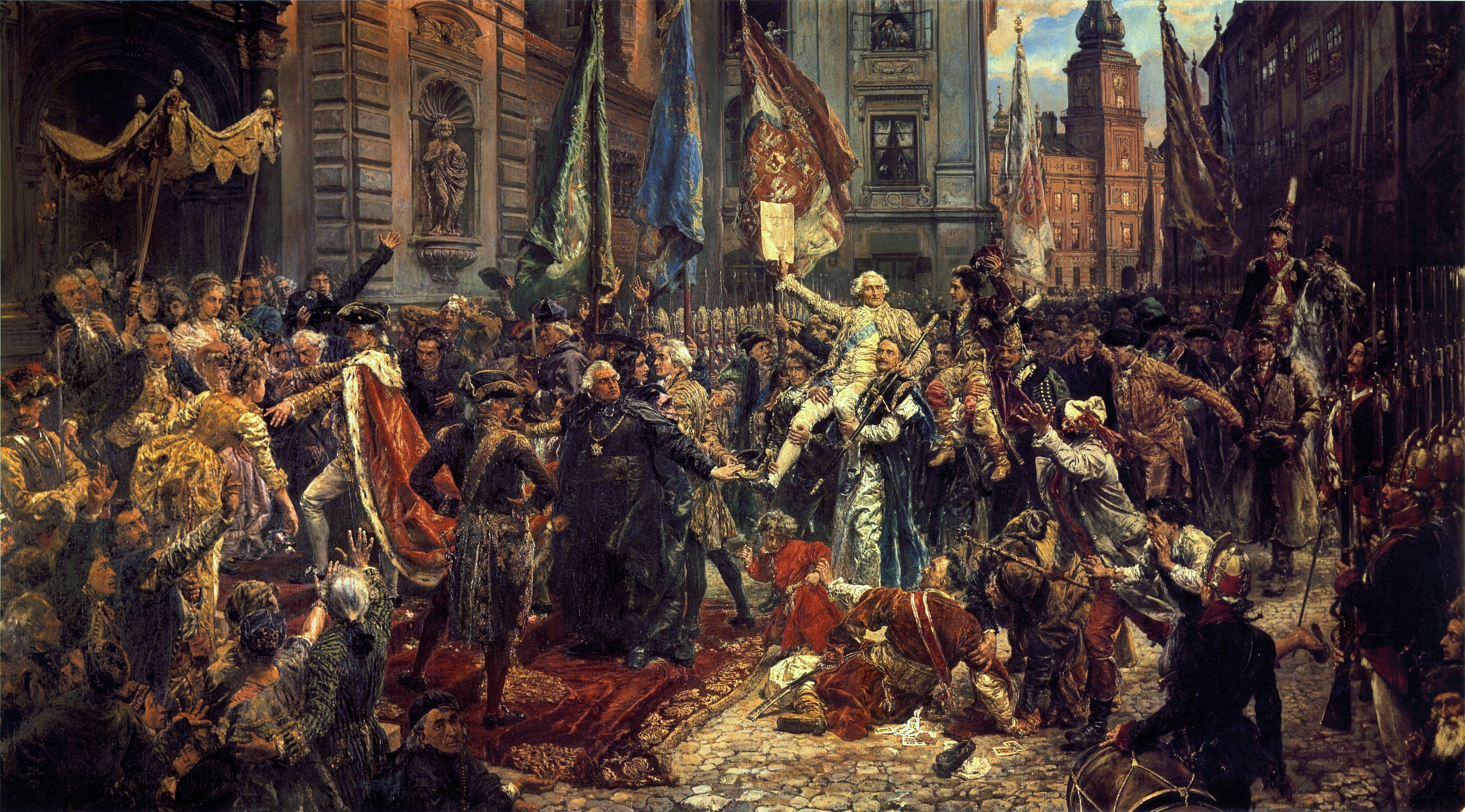
- Artist: Jan Matejko
- Year: 1891
- Medium: Oil on canvas
- Dimensions: 247 cm × 446 cm (97 in × 176 in)
- Location: Royal Castle, Warsaw

The Constitution of 3 May 1791 (Note: The painting has no single dominant title, in either Polish or English. It is referred to variously, using different renderings of the name of the Constitution of 3 May 1791 (e.g., "Constitution of the 3rd May", "Third of May Constitution", and "Constitution of 3 May 1791"); and more elaborately, e.g., Reddaway's "King Stanislaw Augustus entering Warsaw Cathedral after the passing of the reformed Constitution of 1791".) (Polish: Konstytucja 3 Maja 1791 roku) is an 1891 oil painting on canvas by the Polish artist Jan Matejko. It is a large piece, and one of Matejko's best known. The Romantic painting memorializes the Polish Constitution of 3 May 1791, a milestone in the history of the Polish–Lithuanian Commonwealth and a high point of the Polish Enlightenment.

Like many Matejko works, the picture presents a grand scene populated with numerous historic figures, including Poland's last King, Stanisław August Poniatowski; Marshals of the Great Sejm Stanisław Małachowski and Kazimierz Nestor Sapieha; co-authors of the Constitution such as Hugo Kołłątaj and Ignacy Potocki; and other major contemporary figures such as Tadeusz Kościuszko. Some twenty individuals have been identified by modern historians; another ten or so who had been reported in older sources as being present, await definitive identification.

The picture was painted between January and October 1891 to commemorate the Constitution's centenary. It was one of the last works by Matejko, who died in November 1893. The painting was displayed in Lwów (now Lviv, Ukraine) until 1920, when it was moved to Kraków. It was hidden during World War II and later moved to Warsaw, where it now hangs in the Royal Castle.

== Constitution of 3 May 1791 ==
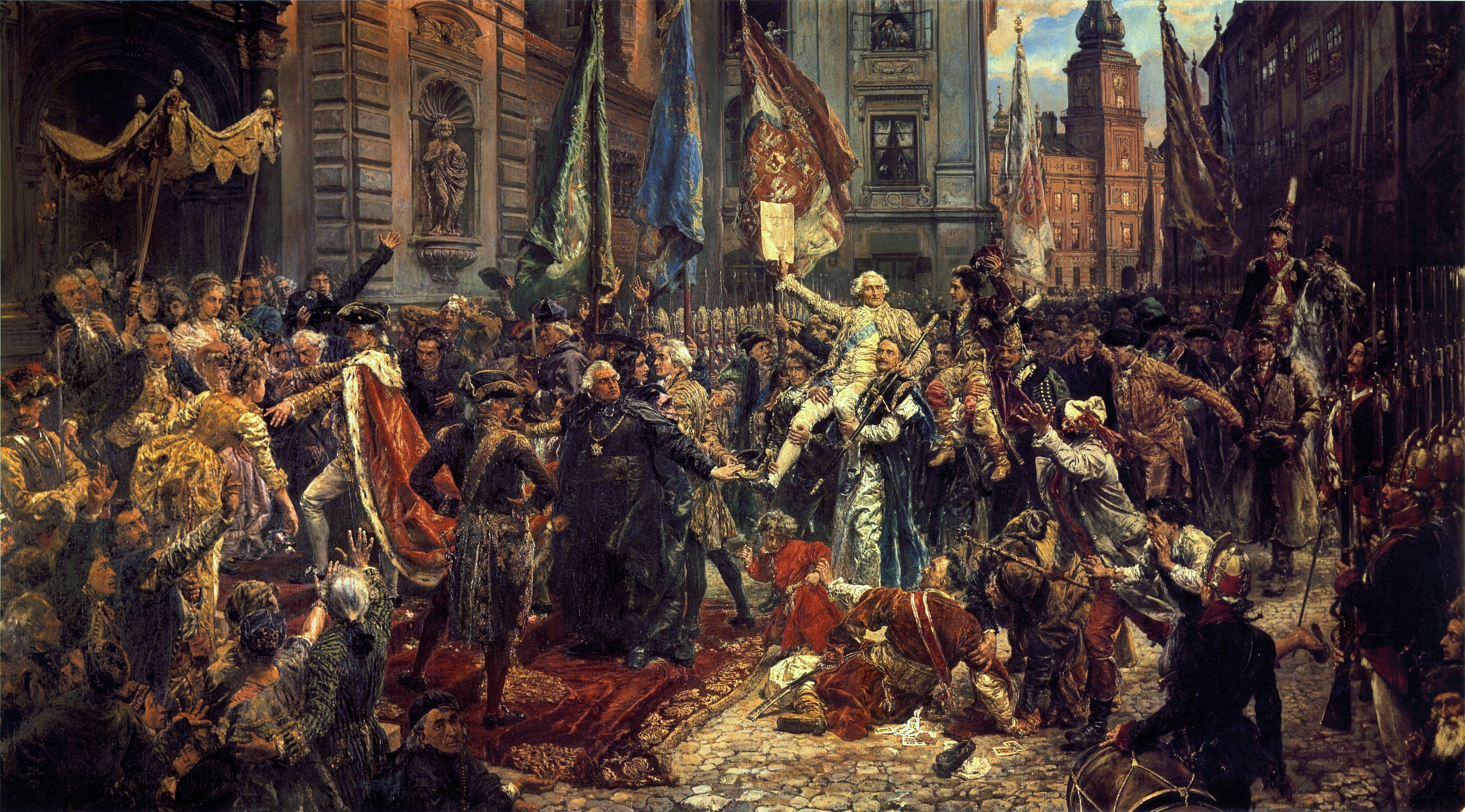
Larger resolution

The Constitution of 3 May 1791 was adopted as a "Government Act" (Polish: Ustawa rządowa) on that date by the Sejm (parliament) of the Polish–Lithuanian Commonwealth. It has been called "the first constitution of its type in Europe" and the world's second oldest constitution.

It was designed to redress long-standing political defects of the Polish–Lithuanian Commonwealth. The Commonwealth's system of "Golden Liberty", which conferred disproportionate rights on the nobility, had increasingly corrupted the Commonwealth's politics. The Constitution sought to supplant the existing anarchy fostered by some of the country's magnates with a more democratic constitutional monarchy. It introduced political equality between townspeople and nobility (szlachta) and placed the peasants under the protection of the government, thus mitigating the worst abuses of serfdom. The Constitution abolished pernicious parliamentary institutions such as the liberum veto, which at one time had put the Sejm at the mercy of any deputy who might choose, or be bribed by an interest or foreign power, to undo the legislation adopted by that Sejm.

The adoption of the 3 May Constitution met with hostile political and military responses from the Commonwealth's neighbors. In the Polish–Russian War of 1792 (sometimes called the "War in Defense of the Constitution"), the Commonwealth was attacked by Catherine the Great's Imperial Russia allied with the Targowica Confederation, a coalition of Polish magnates and landless nobility who opposed reforms that might weaken their influence. The Commonwealth's ally Prussia, under Frederick William II, broke its alliance, and the Commonwealth was defeated. In the end, the Constitution of May 3 remained in force for little more than one year. Despite the Commonwealth's defeat in the Polish–Russian War and the ensuing partitions which eliminated the Commonwealth, the May 3 Constitution remained for more than 123 years a beacon in the struggle to restore Polish sovereignty. In the words of two of its co-authors, Ignacy Potocki and Hugo Kołłątaj, it was "the last will and testament of the expiring Country."

== History ==
A sketch of the work was presented in the cycle History of Civilization in Poland.

Matejko began work on the painting in mid–January 1891, to coincide with the Constitution's centenary. Although the painting was not finished until October, by 3 May it was sufficiently advanced to be shown at the anniversary exhibition in Kraków's Sukiennice. On 7 April 1892, Matejko transferred the painting to Prince Eustachy Stanisław Sanguszko, marshal of the Galician Sejm in Lwów, and it was displayed in the Sejm building (now the main building of Lviv University). The painting was one of the last by Matejko, who died in November 1893.

In 1920, two years after Poland regained independence, the painting was moved to Kraków, where from 1923 it was displayed in the building of the Polish Sejm. The painting was hidden by the Polish resistance during World War II, when Poland was occupied by the Germans. After the war the painting was transferred to the National Museum in Warsaw, and occasionally displayed in the Sejm building. Since 1984 the painting has been in the collection of the Royal Castle in Warsaw, where Matejko himself declared he would like the painting to be shown. The painting is displayed in the anteroom of the Chamber of Senators, where the Constitution was adopted. The painting was restored in 2007.

== Significance and historiography ==
The painting is one of Matejko's best known works and today it is commonly seen as one of his masterpieces, an "education in national history." However, it was less well received by his contemporaries, with turn-of-the-century reviews criticizing it for being "too crowded" and with unclear composition; supporters of Matejko's previous works were much more guarded in their praise of this painting.

Matejko's technique in this painting was subtly but noticeably different compared to his other paintings; authors Wrede et al. attribute this to Matejko's exploration of new techniques, but note that contemporary critiques saw this departure from his old style as the weakening form of the dying master, and did not applaud the changes. They also note that Matejko usually dedicated two years to paintings of that size; this one was completed in less than a year, during a period in which Matejko was working on other projects and suffering from stress and depression. Matejko himself was not fond of the 18th century and the Polish Enlightenment, remarking that he "would rather prefer to paint any other century". He felt compelled, however, by the anniversary of the Constitution to create an artwork commemorating the event, which he recognized as historically significant.

Matejko commonly identified the characters in his paintings with a written legend, but he did not create one for the Constitution. Consequently, some characters in the painting have not been identified. A partial legend was written by Matejko's secretary, Marian Gorzkowski, and even though it provides a list of 39 characters, Wrede et al. write that his "chaotic description" is not very helpful. Modern analysis has been done by Polish historians Jarosław Krawczyk and Emanuel M. Rostworowski.

== Content ==
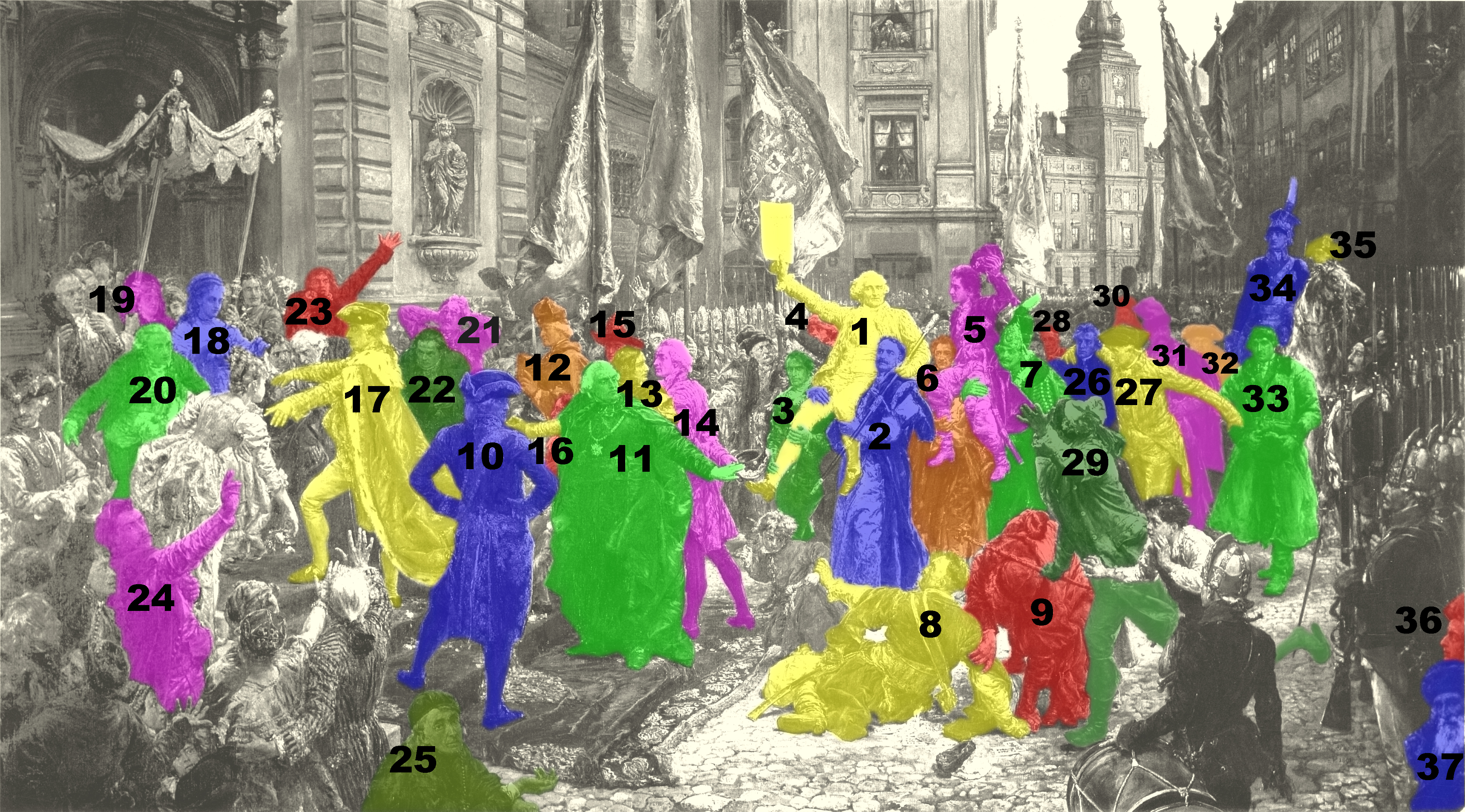
Identified individuals (see text for legend)

The painting, set in the late afternoon of 3 May 1791, shows the procession of deputies from the Royal Castle (background), where the Constitution has just been adopted by the Great Sejm, to St. John's Collegiate Church (left, now an archcathedral), where a Te Deum will be sung. The procession moves down St. John's Street (ulica Świętojańska), surrounded by enthusiastic Warsaw residents and visitors. The deputies are protected by soldiers.

While the procession was an actual historic event, Matejko took many artistic liberties, such as including persons who were not in fact present or had died earlier. He did so because he intended the painting to be a synthesis of the final years of the Commonwealth. He also felt that there was no real historic moment or location that fully captured the spirit of the Constitution, and so he, the artist, needed to create such a moment.

=== Center ===
The painting is centered on the Sejm marshal Stanisław Małachowski (1), who is wearing a white, French-inspired costume. Małachowski holds the marshal staff in his left hand and in his right hand, he triumphantly raises the text of the Constitution. Although the historical document was titled Ustawa rządowa (Government Ordinance), Matejko chose to make the title page of the document as portrayed in his painting more explicit—and at the same time put the name of the painting right in its center. He is carried by deputies Aleksander Linowski of Kraków (2) (on his right) and Ignacy Zakrzewski of Poznań (3) (on his left). Their significance is that Kraków and Poznań are principal cities of two major regions of Poland: Lesser Poland and Greater Poland, respectively. Under Małachowski's right hand there is a figure with a bandaged head holding a flag; this is Tadeusz Kościuszko (4), and his head wound is a reference to the battle of Maciejowice, which took place during the Kościuszko Uprising in 1794, three years after the event depicted in the painting. To the left of Kościuszko, is a figure identified by Wrona et al. as Prince Adam Kazimierz Czartoryski, although this is disputed by other sources.

Another figure, to the right of Małachowski, is being carried; he is Kazimierz Nestor Sapieha (5), marshal of the Lithuanian confederation and the second Sejm marshal. He is dressed in more traditional Polish clothing. Between Małachowski and Sapieha, the head of Julian Ursyn Niemcewicz (6), a well-known writer, is visible. He appears to be carrying Sapieha. The other figure carrying Sapieha, to his right, is Michał Zabiełło (7).

In the lower center of the painting, Matejko shows a scene that took place in the Royal Castle. Jan Suchorzewski (8), deputy from Kalisz and an opponent of the Constitution, has fallen to the ground, holding his young son with one arm; his other hand, holding a knife, is held by Stanisław Kublicki (9), standing to his right. Kublicki was a deputy from Inflanty, a supporter of the townsfolk and peasant causes, and of the Constitution. The artist here alludes to Suchorzewski's unsuccessful attempt to prevent the king from signing the Constitution, during which he threatening to kill his own son to save him from the "slavery of the Constitution". A deck of cards has fallen out of Suchorzewski's pocket, a reference to the manner in which he was bribed by the anti-Constitution Russian ambassador Otto Magnus von Stackelberg and hetman Branicki; Suchorzewski suddenly started winning large sums of money in games, despite his poor skills as a gambler. Branicki (10) can be seen standing between the king and Suchorzewski, dressed in a Russian uniform, foreshadowing the rank of general he received several years later in the Russian Army. In reality Suchorzewski, like most of those opposed to the Constitution, refused to participate in the procession.

Notable figures in the center of the painting, to the left of Małachowski, include other supporters of the Constitution. Father Hugo Kołłątaj (11) is the most prominent, gesturing in disdain at Suchorzewski. Several other figures in the vicinity are described in sources, but their precise location is unclear, or the sources contradict one another. The priest holding the Bible (12) is probably Feliks Turski, although some identify him as Tymoteusz Gorzeński. The figures to the right of Kołłątaj represents the Grand Lithuanian Marshal, Ignacy Potocki (13), and perhaps Adam Kazimierz Czartoryski (14) (although some sources identify Czartoryski elsewhere in the painting, in the vicinity of Kościuszko). Surrounding Kołłątaj are likely the priest Scipione Piattoli (15) and Tadeusz Matuszewicz or Matusiewicz (16).

=== Left ===
On the stairs of the church, King Stanisław August Poniatowski (17) is ascending. Matejko was not very fond of Poniatowski, and he portrayed him in a rather pompous posture, with his hand extended to be kissed, and in the company of numerous pretty ladies, supporting his reputation as a "lady's man". Poniatowski's inclusion in the procession is one of Matejko's artistic liberties, as he had arrived at the church before the procession. A woman hands him a laurel wreath (18); sources have identified her as the Courland princess Dorothea von Medem (Dorothea Biron) or Róża z Martynkowskich, wife of former Warsaw mayor Jan Dekert. Behind her (leftmost in the group of two women, with only her face showing) stands Elżbieta Grabowska (19), the king's mistress and mother of his children. Bowing at the church doors is the former mayor of Warsaw, Jan Dekert (20). He is accompanied by his daughter Marianna (in a yellow dress, facing away from the viewer) taking a prominent position near the king (38). Dekert's inclusion in the painting is another example of Matejko taking liberties with history, as he died in October 1790; he was an important burghers figure associated with the Free Royal Cities Act, which was incorporated into the Constitution.

Behind the king, holding his hands to his head, is Prince Antoni Stanisław Czetwertyński-Światopełk (21), another opponent of the Constitution, known for being on a Russian payroll. Below him is another opponent of the Constitution, Antoni Złotnicki (22). An anonymous black-clad French royalist (23) is shown looking terrified at the scene, seeing another revolution in the making. He raises his hand over the king's head.

In the group of people gathered below the king, in another acknowledgement of the burghers' importance, is burgher Jan Kiliński (24), one of the leaders of the Kościuszko Uprising. To his right, at the edge of the crowd, is the priest Clemens Maria Hofbauer (25), who ran an orphanage and a school in Warsaw and is canonized as a saint in the Catholic church.

=== Right ===
To the right of Sapieha are reformer Stanisław Staszic (26) and, with his hand around Staszic, Andrzej Zamoyski (27), author of the Zamoyski Codex, an earlier attempt to reform the state. To the left of Staszic, the head of bishop of Smoleńsk, Tymoteusz Gorzeński (28), is visible in the crowd. Beneath Staszic and Zamoyski, with an outstretched hand, is Kazimierz Konopka (29), Kołłątaj's secretary and one of the Polish Jacobins; Konopka has a French blue-white-red flower in his hat and a czekan, an ax- and hammer-like weapon, in his hand. Above them is an unnamed Eastern Orthodox priest (30); the figure on his right (31) is either Paweł Ksawery Brzostowski, pioneer of agricultural reforms, or Józef Stępkowski, a less progressive figure. This line of figures ends with Antoni Tyzenhauz (32), Lithuanian official and reformer. To the right of Zamoyski is an unnamed peasant (33). His passive attitude is seen as a representation of the unconcerned attitude of Polish peasantry towards the reforms.

To their right is the king's nephew, prince Józef Poniatowski (34), in the uniform of the light cavalry of the Duchy of Warsaw and riding a grey horse. The uniform is another instance of foreshadowing; Poniatowski became the commander-in-chief of the Duchy's army and died during the Battle of Leipzig. At the time of the passing of the Constitution, he was the commander of the Warsaw garrison, and is shown keeping an eye on the procession, with his soldiers lined up and guarding the street. To his right, partially obscured by Poniatowski's horse's head, is Stanisław Mokronowski (35), deputy, general, and future leader of the Kościuszko Uprising in Lithuania.

At the very bottom right corner, two Polish Jews are on the edge of the scene; the younger (36) one is usually described as enthralled by the events, watching them with hope, but most analysis focuses on the older man (37), whose hand is making a Sy, git ("that's good") gesture. Interpretation of this figure varies; while some suggest that he express his interest and support for the Constitution, which he sees as a promise of further reforms that will improve the situation of the Jews—the Constitution had not addressed them in any significant way—others put him, or both of the Jews, among the opponents of the Constitution, describing them as frowning and disturbed, gleefully anticipating the end of the Commonwealth, or at least concerned with the liberal reforms. The latter interpretation can be also supported by the fact that Matejko tended to portray Jews in his paintings in negative roles.

=== List of characters ===
Historians have positively identified a number of characters. This is the list of characters portrayed on the painting and indicated with numbers on the associated guide picture:

1. Stanisław Małachowski (1736–1809), Crown Marshal of the Grand Sejm, holding the Constitution in his handl
2. Aleksander Linowski, deputy of Kraków, and supporter of the Constitution
3. Ignacy Zakrzewski (1745–1802), City President (Mayor) of Warsaw
4. Tadeusz Kościuszko (1746–1817), Crown Army General
5. Kazimierz Nestor Sapieha (1754–1798), Lithuanian Artillery General
6. Julian Ursyn Niemcewicz, deputy of Inflanty, supporter of the Constitution
7. Michał Zabiełło, deputy of Inflanty, general of the Lithuanian Army
8. Jan Suchorzewski (d. 1809), Wojski of Wschowa, opposed to the Constitution
9. Stanisław Kublicki (or Jan Kublicki), deputy of Inflanty, an active supporter of the Constitution and of the causes of townsfolk and peasants (sources vary with regards to his name)
10. Franciszek Branicki (ca. 1730–1819), Grand Hetman of the Crown, opposed to the Constitution
11. Hugo Kołłątaj (1750–1812), Underchancellor of the Crown, co-author of the Constitution
12. Feliks Turski, bishop of Kraków
13. Ignacy Potocki (1750–1809), Grand Marshal of Lithuania, co-author of the Constitution (location indicated on the picture could be incorrect)
14. Adam Kazimierz Czartoryski (1734–1832), Prefect General of Podolia, supporter of the Constitution (the location of this figure is disputed by some sources)
15. Scipione Piattoli, priest, secretary of king Poniatowski, supporter of the Constitution
16. Tadeusz Matuszewicz (Matusiewicz), deputy, supporter of the Constitution
17. Stanisław August Poniatowski (1732–1798), King of Poland and Grand Duke of Lithuania 1764–1795, co-author of the Constitution
18. Dorothea von Medem (Dorothea Biron), Courland princess (also identified as Róża z Martynkowskich, wife of Dekert)
19. Elżbieta Grabowska (1748–1810), king's mistress
20. Jan Dekert (1738–1790), former City President (Mayor) of Warsaw
21. Antoni Stanisław Czetwertyński-Światopełk (1748–1794), Castellan of Przemyśl, opposed to the Constitution
22. Antoni Złotnicki, deputy of Podolia, opponent of the Constitution
23. An unnamed French royalist
24. Jan Kiliński (1760–1819), shoemaker, member of the Warsaw City Council
25. Clemens Maria Hofbauer (1751–1820), Redemptorist (priest)
26. Stanisław Staszic (1755–1826), scientist and political writer
27. Andrzej Zamoyski (1716–1792), Grand Chancellor of the Crown
28. Tymoteusz Gorzeński, bishop of Smoleńsk
29. Kazimierz Konopka (1769–1805), Hugo Kołłątaj's secretary
30. An unnamed Orthodox priest
31. Paweł Ksawery Brzostowski, Catholic priest, pioneer of agricultural reforms
32. Antoni Tyzenhauz, Lithuanian official and reformer.
33. An unnamed peasant
34. Józef Poniatowski (1763–1813), General-Major
35. Stanisław Mokronowski, deputy, general, leader of the Kościuszko Uprising in Lithuania
36. An unnamed young Jew
37. An unnamed old Jew

Several more figures have been identified by historians as likely present in the painting, but their exact location is unknown, and they are also not present on the guide picture:

1. Marianna Dekert, Dekert's daughter
2. Antoni Barnaba Jabłonowski, castellan of Kraków, supporter of the Constitution and of the townsfolk cause - his location on the picture was described by Wrona et al. as unknown; probably near Małachowski
3. Stanisław Badeni, king's secretary - like Jabłonkowski, his exact location is unknown, likely near Małachowski
4. Pious Kiliński, king's secretary, his exact location uncertain, likely near Gorzeński
5. Joachim Chreptowicz, Foreign Minister and Chancellor
6. Antoni Józef Lanckoroński, treasury official and member of the Commission of National Education
