= Jacques Calmanson =

Polish Jewish maskilic writer

- Solomon Jacob ben Kalman
- Born: 1722; Hrubieszów, Polish–Lithuanian Commonwealth
- Died: 1811 (aged 88–89); Warsaw, Duchy of Warsaw, French Empire
- Occupation: Physician
- Writing career
- Notable work: Essai sur l'état actuel des Juifs de Pologne et leur perfectibilité (1796)

Jacques Calmanson (Hebrew: זַ׳אק קָלְמָנְסוֹן; 1722, Hrubieszów – 1811, Warsaw), born Solomon Jacob ben Kalman (Hebrew: שְׁלֹמֹה יַעֲקֹב בֵּן קָלְמָן), was a Polish Jewish maskilic writer, translator, and personal physician of King Stanislaw II.

== Biography ==
Jacques Calmanson was born in Hrubieszów, where his father served as rabbi. He studied medicine in Germany and France and was fluent in Yiddish, Hebrew, French, German, and Polish. Calmanson's travels also took him to Turkey and Russia. He eventually settled in Warsaw, serving as physician to King Stanislaw II. In 1784, Calmanson wrote a pamphlet to the king regarding taxes that the Jews were allegedly hiding from the royal court and in 1791 translated a Hebrew text into Polish, which invited representatives of the Jewish communities to come to Warsaw to meet with the king and help pay off the royal debt.

During the proceedings of the Four-Year Sejm, Calmanson was the royal translator of the Hebrew and Yiddish magazines, and mediated between royal secretary Scipione Piattoli and the envoys of Jewish communities. For his services, he received a salary from the king and the Masonic lodge, which was maintained even after the king's death in 1798.

=== Later life ===
After Warsaw fell under Prussian rule in 1796, Calmanson published Essai sur l'état actuel des Juifs de Pologne et leur perfectibilité, which he dedicated to Karl Georg von Hoym, the Prussian commissioner for the annexed Polish areas. The pamphlet, which called for a reform of Jewish life, was translated into Polish the following year as Uwagi nad niniejszym stanem Żydów polskich i ich wydoskonaleniem and dedicated to Tsar Alexander I who, in gratitude, send Calmanson a gift of cigarettes through the mediation of Adam Jerzy Czartoryski. Calmanson's proposals to the authorities included, among others, limiting the autonomy of Jews and the judicial power of rabbinic courts, replacing cheders with state-run public schools, state supervision of Jewish marriage, and compulsory adoption of "European" dress and customs. Parts of his proposal were adopted by the Prussian authorities in 1797.

Particularly notable is Calmanson's critique of the growing Hasidic movement, which he depicted as antithetical to the Enlightenment and an obstacle to the reform of Jewish society and its integration into the state. Cleansing Judaism of the fanaticism represented by the Hasidim and Frankists, argued Calmanson, would revive the customs and morality of the Jews and return to its previous form—which, according to him, resembled the Enlightenment ideal of natural religion. He called the government to undertake firm measures against the movement and its adherents.

== See also ==
- Enlightenment in Poland
