= San Procolo, Florence =

Church building in Florence, Italy

Coordinates: 43°46′14.86″N 11°15′31.43″E

Church of San Procolo
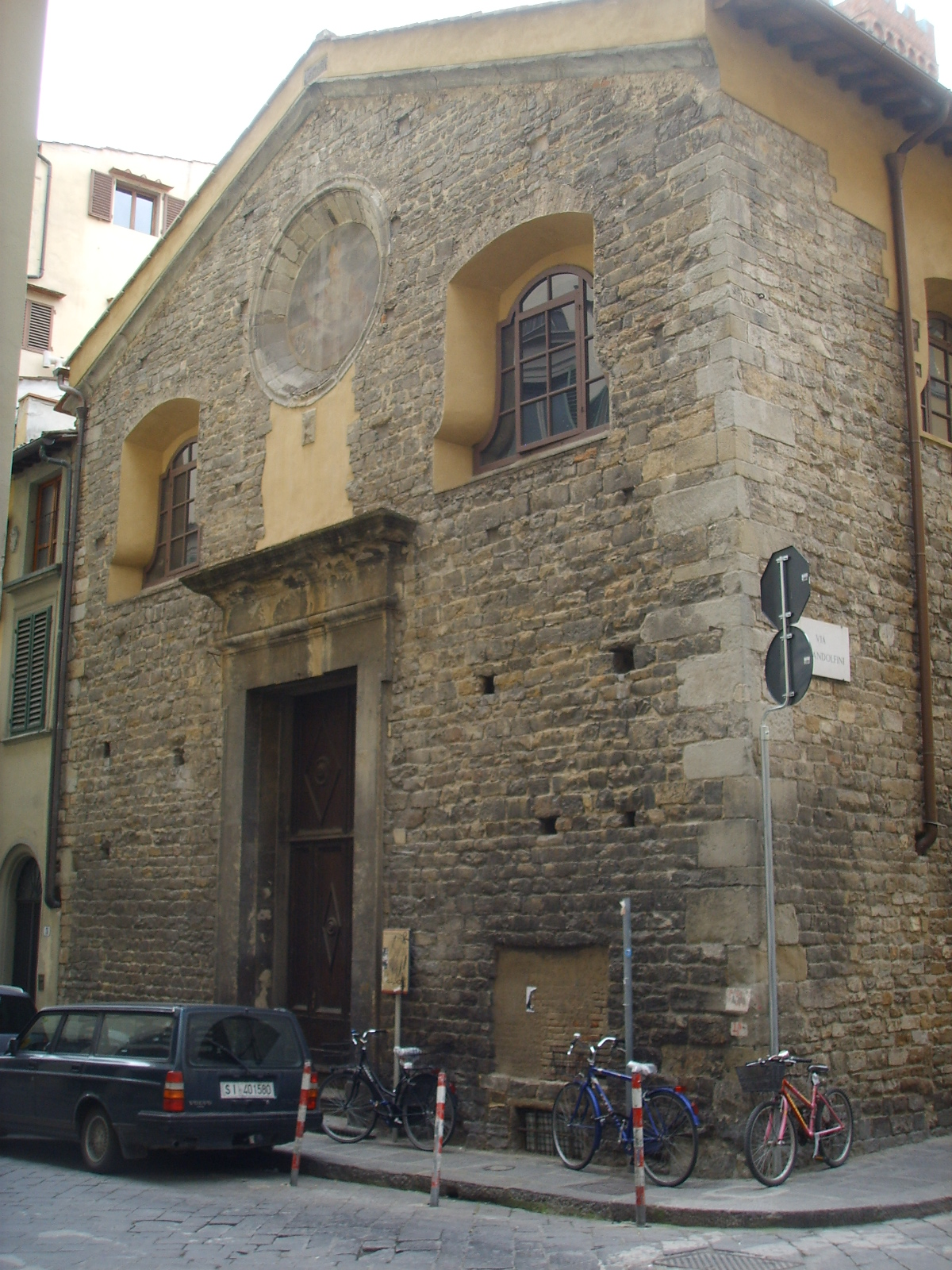

Religion
- Affiliation: Roman Catholic
- Province: Florence, Italy

Location
- Location: Florence, Italy
- Interactive map of Church of San Procolo

Architecture
- Type: Church
- Style: Romanesque and Baroque
- Groundbreaking: 13th century
- Completed: 1743

San Proculo, previously dedicated to the saints Proculus and Nicomedes, is a Romanesque-style, Roman Catholic church located in Via de' Giraldi in Florence, Tuscany, Italy.

== History ==
A church at the site was present by 13th century. The façade is in rough stone with a central rose window and two large side windows. Three other open windows along the sides on Via Pandolfini. The building was renovated from 1739 to 1743, when it became the seat of the Confraternity of Sant'Antonio Abate dei Macellai, one of the four Flagellant brotherhoods known as buche, characterized by the practice of flogging, strict discipline, and night time prayer meetings. The other three Brotherhoods were of the church of San Jacopo sopr'Arno, the church of St Jerome, and the church of St Paul. After the second world war, the church was used to house the indigent. It was heavily damaged by 1966 Flood of the Arno River. San Procolo heals a boy by Gaetano Piattoli, is on the main altar. Most of the other works of art previously in the church were moved to other sites or destroyed.

In 2018, Michel Elefteriades acquired the San Procolo church from the noble Salviati family, to make it an art gallery in which he would exhibit his medieval religious art collection and creations. But in 2019, after Elefteriades bought the church, the Italian Ministry of Cultural Heritage exercised his diritto de prelazione (right of refusal), due to the importance of this church, a premiere in the last decades.

Among works once in the church were:

- Ambrogio Lorenzetti, Triptych of San Procolo and Stories of St Nicola, now at Uffizi
- Lorenzo Monaco, Annunciation, now at Galleria dell'Accademia
- Filippino Lippi, Crucifixion with Mary and St. Francis, destroyed
- Filippino Lippi, Mary Magdalen, now at Galleria dell'Accademia
- Filippino Lippi, St John the Baptist, now at Galleria dell'Accademia
