= Zaremba coat of arms =

Polish coat of arms

Zaremba
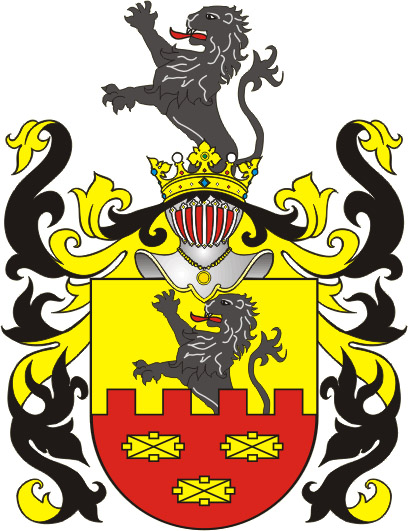
- Battle cry: Zaręba
- Alternative names: Zaręba, Zarębczyc
- Earliest mention: 1301
- Towns: Tuliszkow, Sławsk, Jarocin, Zaręby
- Families: 85 names altogether: Belakowicz, Belakowski, Bielakowski, Bielawski, Bieliński, Bilewski, Borowy, Borzek, Boxycki, Brudzewski, Brzostkowski, Celiński, Cerekwicki, Cielecki, Cieliński, Cieluski, Czerejski, Czerekwicki, Czurlej, Drzewoszewski, Drzewuszewski, Figietty, Gastell, Gimel, Ginet, Ginett, Giniat, Głodzieński, Głoskowski, Godurowski, Godziacki, Golgin, Gorszewski, Gorzewski, Grabowski, Groszek, Gurzewski, Hadziacki, Himelreich, Illewicz, Illukiewicz, Jabłonowski, Jakowiecki, Jaraczeski, Jaraczewski, Jaraczowski, Jaskólecki, Jaskulecki, Jastrzębski, Jasuda, Jasudajtis, Jasudowicz, Jermoła, Kens, Kłobuszewski, Korzkiewski, Lubisiński, Magnuszewski, Mańkowski, Milowicz, Mysław, Noskowski, Noszkowski, Perłowski, Poburski, Pogrzybowski, Rudziański, Rudzieński, Rychwalski, Shkirpan, Szkirpan, Skrzyński, Skrzypiński, Skwarski, Słotowicz, Strzyński, Sucharzewski, Suchorzewski, Szczeniżewski, Tuliszkowski, Tymieniecki, Tyminiecki, Wielewcki, Zajączkowski, Zaremba, Zarembiński, Zarembski, Zaręba, Zarębiński, Zarębski

Zaremba is a Polish coat of arms. It was used by several szlachta (noble) families in the times of the Polish–Lithuanian Commonwealth.

== History ==
The first historical record of the Zaremba coat of arms appears on the shield of Thomas II Zaremba, prince-bishop of Nysa, in 1270 CE. In the 12th century, the Zaremba clan itself founded the town and endowed the church of Tuliszkow. Tuliszkow would become the seat of the Zaremba clan and in 1450, Mikolaj Zaremba, castellan of Leczyca, built the St. Vitus church, which still stands today.

The Zaremba coat of arms is mentioned by Romain Gary in his novel Promise at dawn.

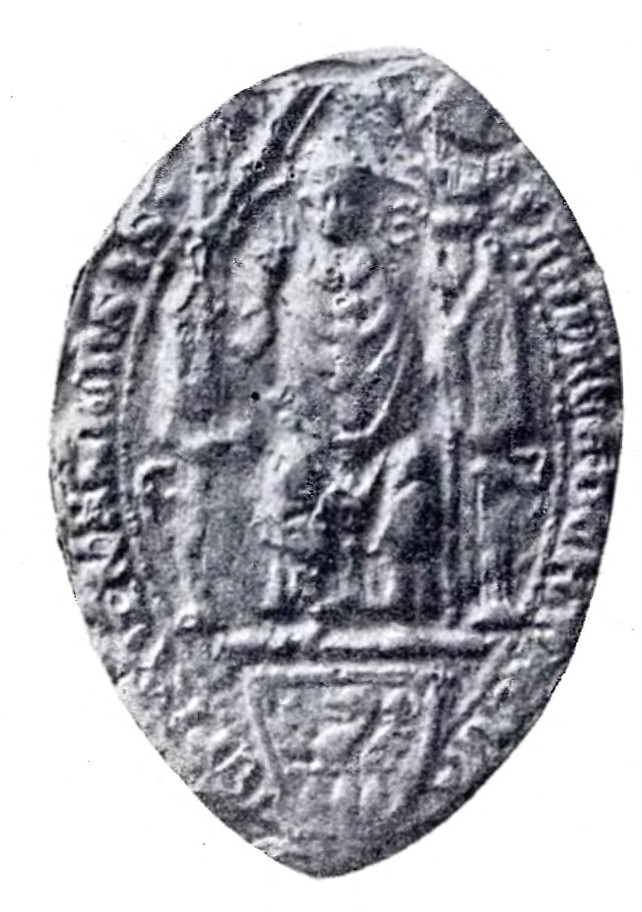
Zaremba Coat of Arms seen at the bottom of Bishop Andrzej's seal.

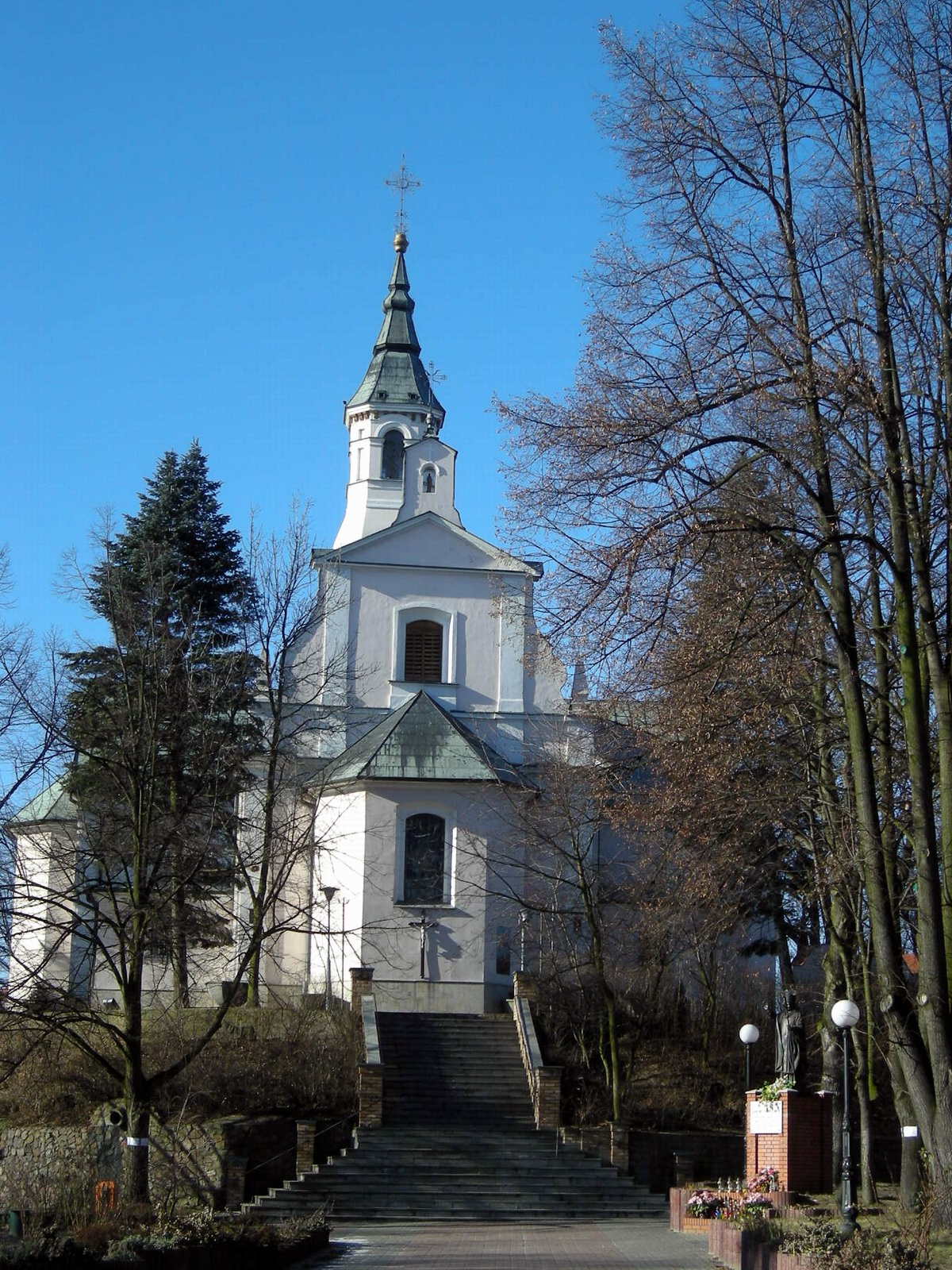
St. Vitus Church in Tuliszków, Poland, built by the Zaremba Clan in the 15th century.

Zaręby Church Coat of Arms.

== Blazon ==
Per fess or and gules, embattled. In chief a demi lion rampant issuant sable, langued gules. In base three golden bricks 2 and 1 garnished or. For a crest: out of a ducal coronet a lion as in the arms.

== Notable bearers ==
Thomas II Zaremba, Prince–Bishop of Nysa, 13th century

Marcin of Sławsko, Lord High Steward of Kalisz, 14th century

Andrzej Zaremba, Bishop of Poznań, 14th century

Jan Suchorzewski, nobleman, politician, and soldier (ca. 1740–1804)

Józef Zaremba, Polish military commander and general of the 18th century.

== See also ==
- Polish heraldry
- Heraldry
- Coat of arms
