= Pogoń Ruska coat of arms =

Polish coat of arms

Pogoń Ruska
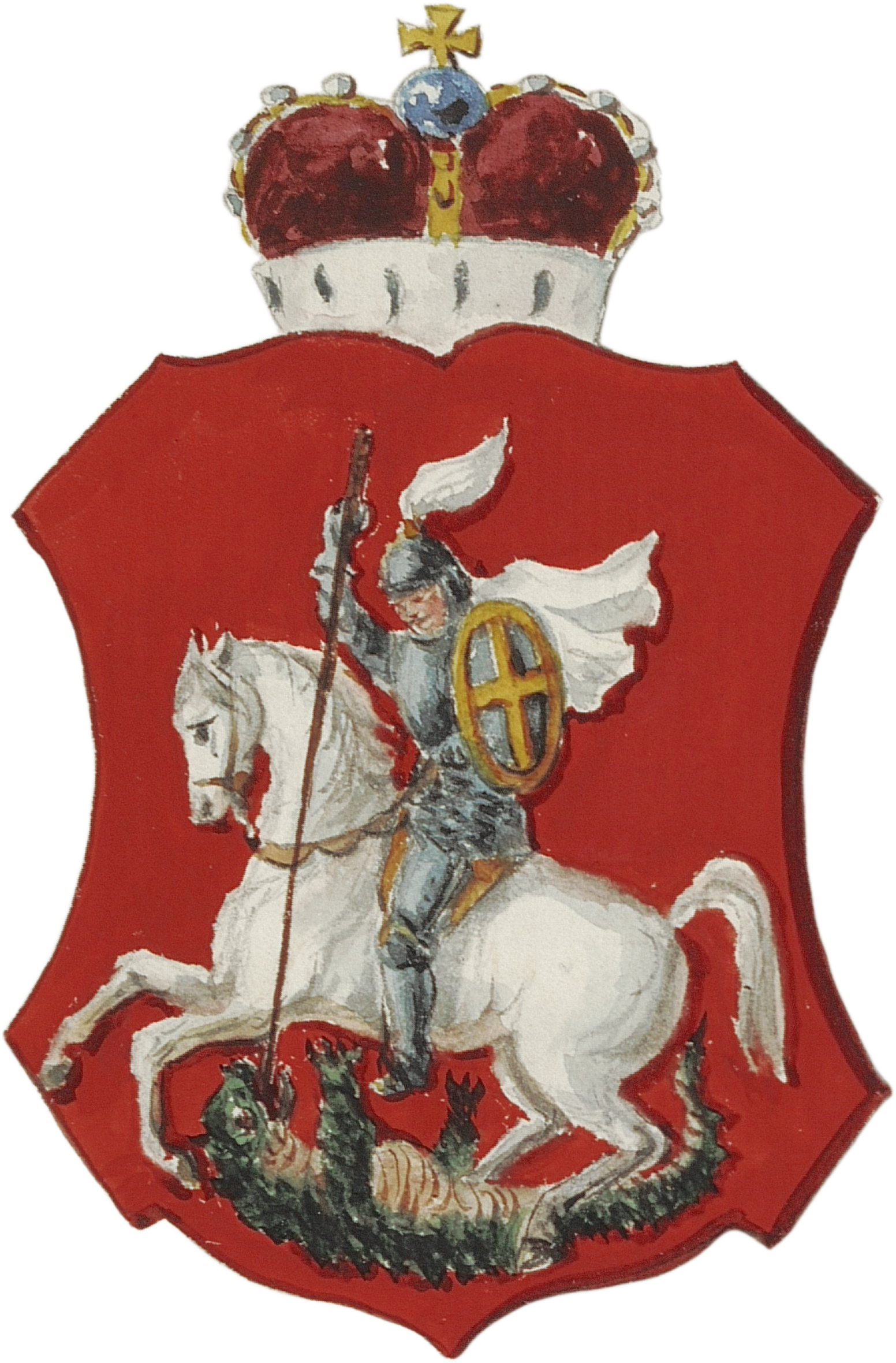
- Earliest mention: unknown
- Towns: Moscow, Kamianets-Podilskyi in 1374
- Families: Sokolski, Czetwertyński-Światopełk, Możajski, Sokolski, Szujski - Szuyski, Żyliński

Pogoń Ruska is a Polish coat of arms with Ruthenian roots. It was used by several princely families of the stock from the Rurik dynasty in the times of the Polish–Lithuanian Commonwealth.

== History ==
The Ruthenian Pogonia is the coat of arms of the Kyivan princes. Yaroslav the Wise had a Christian name, Yurii (George), in honor of St. George the Serpent-Slayer. The Ruthenian Pogonia depicts St. George killing a serpent. This coat of arms was worn by Ruthenian (Ukrainian) princes, as well as cities such as Kyiv, Kamianets-Podilskyi, Volodymyr, Zbarazh, and Nizhyn.

== Blazon ==
It displays Saint George defeating the dragon.

== Notable bearers ==
Notable bearers of this coat of arms include:

  - Czetwertyński family
    - Seweryn Franciszek Światopełk-Czetwertyński
    - Antoni Stanisław Czetwertyński-Światopełk
- Former coat of arms of the Ostrogski family

== See also ==
- Coat of arms of Georgia (country)
- Coat of arms of Russia
- Pogoń Litewska
- Polish nobility
- Ruthenian nobility
