= Anna Tonelli =

Italian artist (c. 1763–1846)

- Born: Anna Nistri c. 1763; Florence, Grand Duchy of Tuscany
- Died: 22 July 1846; Florence, Grand Duchy of Tuscany
- Other name: Anna Nistri Tonelli
- Known for: painting

Anna Tonelli, née Anna Nistri (c. 1763 – 1846) was an Italian portrait painter, active in the late 18th century and early 19th century primarily in Florence and London. She often worked on miniature painting, watercolors, and pastels.

== Biography ==
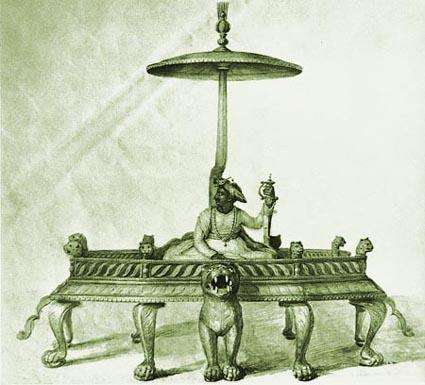
Tipu Sultan seated on his throne (1800) by Anna Tonelli

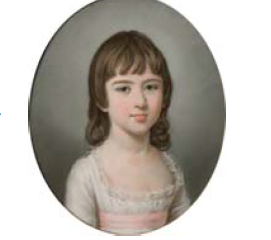
Portrait of Charlotte Percy, Duchess of Northumberland by Anna Tonelli, (circa 1790)

Anna Nistri was born c. 1763 in Florence, Italy. In 1785, she married Italian violinist and composer, it:Luigi Tonelli and together they had two children. It is thought she received training in fine art from Giuseppe Piattoli in Florence.

Early in her career, she painted portraits of Henry Blundell and Edward Clive, Earl of Powis. From 1794, she lived in London, where she taught the Clive's children in drawing and exhibited twice at the Royal Academy of Arts in 1794 and 1797. From 1798 to 1801, she accompanied the Clive family a trip to India, where she worked primarily in watercolors. After the trip to India, she returned to Italy to be with her family.

Her work is included in public museum collections including the British Museum, the Holburne Museum, National Gallery of Art, among others.
