= Józef Zaremba =

Polish general and noble

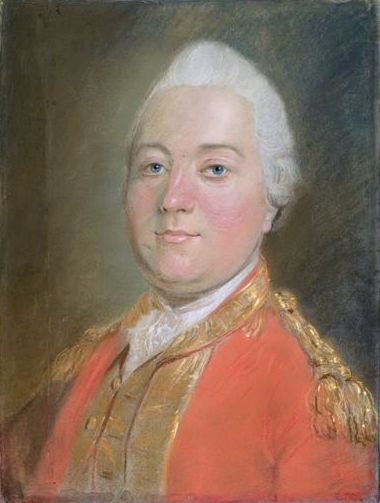
Portrait of Jozef Zaremba

Józef Zaremba (c.1731 - 1774) was a Polish noble (of the Zaremba coat of arms) and general. He fought on the side of the Bar Confederation. He took part in the siege of Częstochowa, battle of Kościan and the battle of Widawa. Defeated in 1772 at the battle of Piotrków he surrendered to the king. He received the rank of the general afterwards, but did not see any action before his death.

He died as a result of burns he sustained in a new, thermic bath.
