= Scipione Piattoli =

Italian Catholic priest (1749–1809)

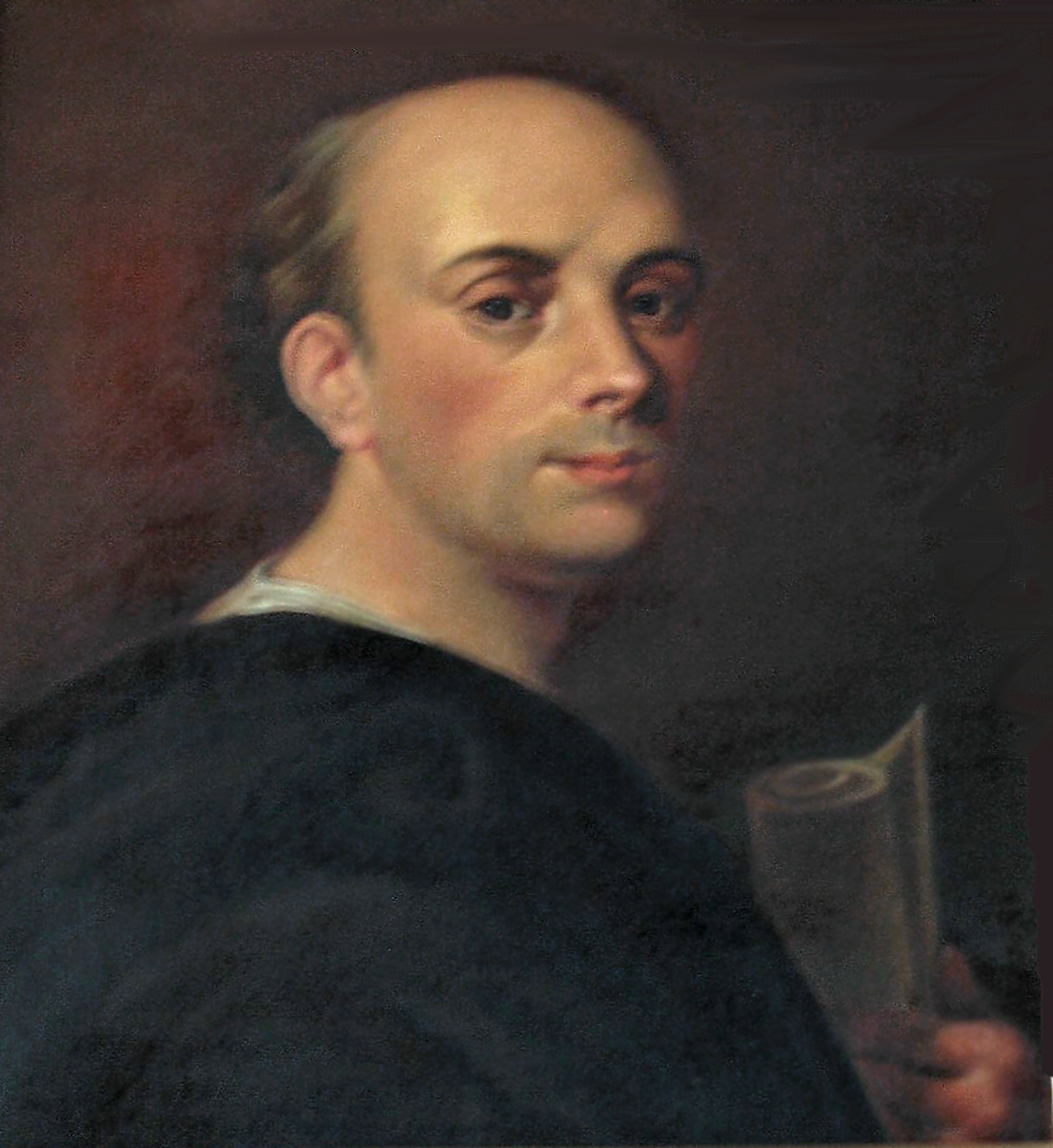
- Born: 10 November 1749; Florence, Grand Duchy of Tuscany
- Died: 12 April 1809 (aged 59); Altenburg, Saxe-Gotha-Altenburg, Rhine Confederation
- Other name: Urban
- Occupations: Priest; educator; writer; political activist
- Known for: Co-drafting the Constitution of 3 May 1791

Scipione Piattoli (Italian pronunciation: [ʃiˈpjoːne ˈpjattoli]; 10 November 1749 – 12 April 1809) was an Italian Catholic priest—a Piarist—an educator, writer, and political activist, and a major figure of the Enlightenment in Poland. After ten years as a professor at the University of Modena in Italy, he emigrated to the Polish–Lithuanian Commonwealth, where he became associated with several magnate families—the Potockis, Lubomirskis and Czartoryskis. He was a member of Duchess Dorothea von Medem's court in Courland (Lithuania) and of King Stanisław August Poniatowski's court.

Piattoli was politically active in Warsaw during and after the Four-Year Sejm (1788–1792). He served as intermediary between the reformist Patriotic Party and King Stanisław August Poniatowski, and as an aide to the King (1789–1793). He is best remembered for his participation in drafting the Constitution of 3 May 1791, a milestone in the history of Polish political legislation. He was an organiser of the 1794 Kościuszko Insurrection against Russian influence, which was the last armed struggle held under the banners of the Commonwealth. After the Third Partition of Poland (1795), Piattoli was interned by the Austrians for several years, together with another Polish activist of the Constitution movement, Hugo Kołłątaj. Freed in 1800, he worked several years with Polish and Russian statesman Prince Adam Jerzy Czartoryski in the service of Russia, before retiring to Courland.

Piattoli was an inspiration to Leo Tolstoy, who based the figure of Abbé Morio in War and Peace (1869) on him. He is also one of the figures immortalized in Jan Matejko's 1891 painting, Constitution of 3 May 1791. In his 1980 ten-page entry on Piattoli in the Polish Biographical Dictionary, historian Emanuel Rostworowski notes that, "despite two Italian monographs (by A.D. Ancon and G. Bozzolato)", Piattoli still awaits a definitive biography.

== Early life ==
Scipione Piattoli was born in Florence on 10 November 1749 to a family of painters (father, Gaetano Piattoli; mother, Anna Bacherini Piattoli; brother, Giuseppe Piattoli).

In 1763, he joined the Piarist order, taking the name Urban. Some historians have questioned whether he ever took holy orders; in any case he was known for a rather secular lifestyle. He taught rhetoric in Piarist schools in Massa and Corregio, and got his doctorate from the University of Florence. From 1772 to 1782, he was a professor at the University of Modena, teaching religious history and Greek. Soon he became involved in political activism, and in 1774 he published (anonymously) a brochure titled Saggio intorno al luogo del seppellire, which focused on the issue of hygiene and burials near churches. Also in 1774 he received permission to leave the Piarists, and resumed using the name Scipione. He would, however, keep and use the title of "the priest" (« l'abbé ») for most of his life. By the turn of the decade, Piattoli found himself in a faction that was losing in the politics of Modena, and decided to move, giving up his professorship in 1782.

Piattoli arrived in the Polish–Lithuanian Commonwealth that year, as a tutor for the sons of Piotr Potocki, a member of the magnate Potocki family. It was said in a contemporary account that his entire material wealth at that time was composed of a "sizable library". Piattoli ended his service with the Potocki family around 1784 due to personal disagreements with Pelagia Potocka and Maria Radziwiłł. In the meantime, he became associated with the Lubomirski family—Izabela Lubomirska in particular—and through them befriended Stanisław Kostka Potocki and Grzegorz Piramowicz. Through Potocki and Piramowicz he became a member of the Society for Elementary Books in 1784. In the Society, he was tasked with writing a textbook on the history of science. Around that time, he was also active in Warsaw freemasonry.

Piattoli travelled through Europe in the retinue of the Lubomirski family, including Izabela, and as a tutor of young Henryk Lubomirski. During that time, he developed extensive contacts at various European courts in Courland, Austria (Vienna), Italy (Turin) and France (Paris). During his three-year stay in the Lubomirskis' Parisian residence, he was in touch with many important men of the Age of Enlightenment. He met—often through another Florentinian, Filippo Mazzei—Johann Wolfgang von Goethe, Thomas Jefferson, the Marquis de Lafayette, Luigi Landriani, Girolamo Lucchesini and the Marquis de Condorcet. He also corresponded with J. G. Herder. In Poland, he developed close contacts with Ignacy Potocki and Julian Ursyn Niemcewicza. From 1787 he also tutored Adam Jerzy Czartoryski, later an important politician in the Russian Empire, on whom Piattoli would retain significant influence.

== Reformer and constitution drafter ==
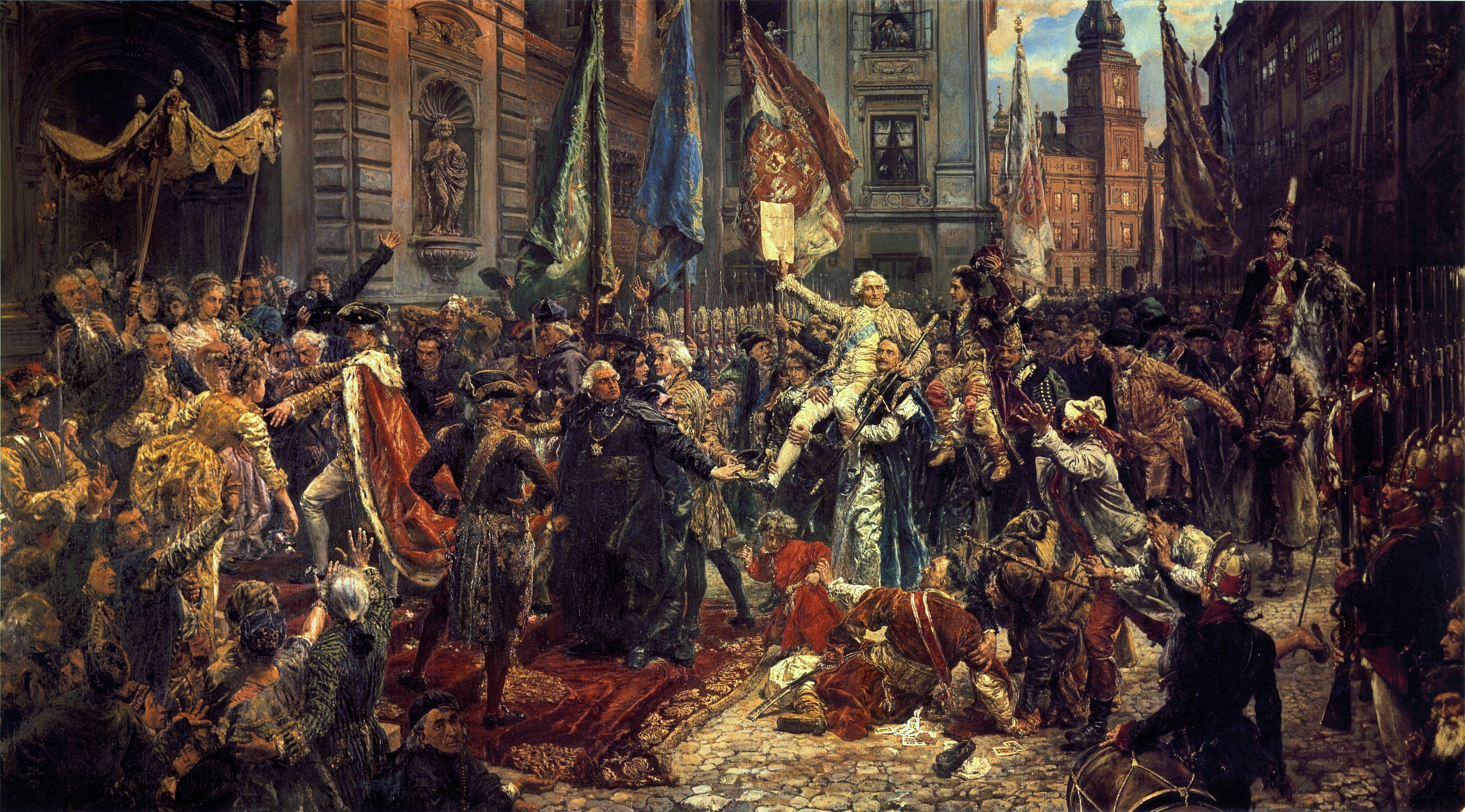
Constitution of 3 May 1791, a 19th century painting by Jan Matejko. Piattoli is one of many historical characters featured on this canvas. See here for a detailed legend.

Piattoli developed contacts with notable figures on the Polish political scene, initially from the group opposed to the royal faction. By the end of his stay in Paris, he likely became a supporter of reforms in France and Poland, and begun taking his first serious steps in political activism, through the involvement in the Quattuowirat, a group of magnates planning a (never realized) confederacy. He became a foreign member of the Société des Amis des Noirs.

Through his freemason contacts with Pierre Maurice Glayre, Piattoli won the confidence of Poland's King Stanisław August Poniatowski, becoming his agent in Paris and, by the end of 1789, his private secretary and librarian, although without any official title. Acting as a sort of cultural aide, Piattoli, who had strong ties to the reformist and often anti-royal opposition, became an important link between the reformers—Ignacy Potocki in particular—and the king. In the words of a Swedish diplomat, L. Engstrom, he was "like a tireless spring", constantly mediating between the two factions.

Due to his association with the reformers, in conservative Rome, he became infamous as a staunch supporter of revolutionary ideals and was accused of "democratism". Vatican diplomats criticised the king for hiring such a "revolutionary", but the king defended Piattoli quite vividly. In any case, many such claims were exaggerations or rumours spread by his political enemies: according to one such rumour, Piattoli was alleged to incite crowds in France to kill the king. In reality, Piattoli supported the Monarchiens of the French Revolution's early stages, but more in the direction of peaceful transformation into a constitutional republic than the regicidal excesses.

Between 1790 and 1792, Piattoli was sent on several sensitive diplomatic missions for the king to Berlin and other places. He was involved in the negotiations of the Polish–Prussian alliance. He collaborated with Ignacy Potocki, helping draft many texts connected with Potocki's work in the Sejm, the legislature of the Polish–Lithuanian Commonwealth. He was also an active supporter of Poniatowski's plan for a hereditary succession.

Piattoli, as Poniatowski's secretary and a resident of the Royal Castle in Warsaw, has been credited with winning the King over to the idea of social reforms and with playing a part in the drafting of the Constitution of 3 May 1791. The exact nature of Piattoli's role in regard to the Constitution remains uncertain; modern historians disagree to what degree he was an executor, a mediator, or an initiator. He played a role in convincing the King to collaborate with the leaders of the Patriotic Party on drafting a constitution. He might have prepared or expanded drafts of the document, based on discussions among the principal authors, including the King, Hugo Kołłątaj (another politically active Roman Catholic priest) and Ignacy Potocki. At a minimum, he seems to have helped catalyze the process. Historian Emanuel Rostworowski describes him as a vital secretary-editor, who certainly participated in related discussions and influenced both Potocki and the king, and calls Piattoli's quarters in the Royal Palace a "creche" of the constitution. Piattoli was, finally, involved in the final preparations for the vote that took place during the Sejm session on 3 May.

Later that month he became a founder of the Friends of the Constitution. He was active in various political causes and worked closely with other key figures in Poland such as Hugo Kołłątaj. He became a trusted adviser to Dorothea von Medem, Duchess of Courland. He supported reforms to improve the status of the burghers and Jews.

== Final years ==
During the War in Defence of the Constitution in 1792, Piattoli found himself on another diplomatic mission to Dresden, where he stayed after the Commonwealth's defeat at the hands of Imperial Russia resulted in the Second Partition of Poland. In Dresden and nearby Leipzig, Piattoli was active in the circles of Polish patriotic emigres, who included Potocki and Kolłątaj. In 1793, he officially parted ways with Poniatowski, receiving a letter in which he was discharged from his service. In 1794, he was involved in the preparations for the Kościuszko Insurrection against Russian influence, and in negotiations with the newly republican France, in which Polish reformists proposed an alliance with France, promising to turn Poland into a second republic in Europe. At the same time, he was involved in much more conservative negotiations with Russians.

In July 1794, he and several other activists were exiled from Leipzig, and Piattoli was soon arrested by the Austrian authorities. After the failure of the Kościuszko Insurrection later in 1794, many prisoners were set free, but Piattoli was kept imprisoned, together with Kołłątaj, as the Russian authorities insisted that the two were "extremely dangerous". Hence, even after the final Partitions of the Polish–Lithuanian Commonwealth in 1795, Piattoli was kept interned in Prague by the Austrian Empire authorities until 1800, despite requests for his release from Poniatowski and even Napoleon Bonaparte. His release in 1800 seems to have been the result of efforts of the Czartoryski family and Duchess Dorothea.

After his release, he returned to Dorothea's Courland court, where he served as a tutor for her daughter. Around 1803, he began cooperating with Adam Jerzy Czartoryski, who was now working for the Russian authorities. Around that time, he and Czartoryski authored a plan for a Europe and federal organisation of states intended to prevent armed conflicts and to maintain perpetual peace. Piattoli, through Czartoryski, briefly worked in the diplomatic service and administration of the Russians, too. Like Czartoryski, Piattoli tried to push for a more lenient and friendly attitude towards Poland at the Russian court, but with little success.

In 1807, Scipione Piattoli returned to Courland. There he finally settled, abandoned the priesthood, and married one of the ladies of the court. In his final years in Courland, he was involved with Courland's educational system and hoped to pursue some scientific studies, a lifelong dream for which he never found enough time. He died of a lung infection in Altenburg on 12 April 1809. He was buried in a park in Löbichau.

== Legacy ==
Piattoli was an inspiration to Leo Tolstoy, who based the figure of the Abbé Morio in War and Peace (1869) on him. He is also one of the figures immortalized in Jan Matejko's 1891 painting, Constitution of 3 May 1791. In his 1980 ten-page entry on Piattoli in the Polish Biographical Dictionary, historian Emanuel Rostworowski notes that, "despite two Italian monographs (by A.D. Ancon and G. Bozzolato)", Piattoli does not have a definitive biography.

== See also ==
- Italy–Poland relations
