= Maria Naryshkina =

Polish noblewoman

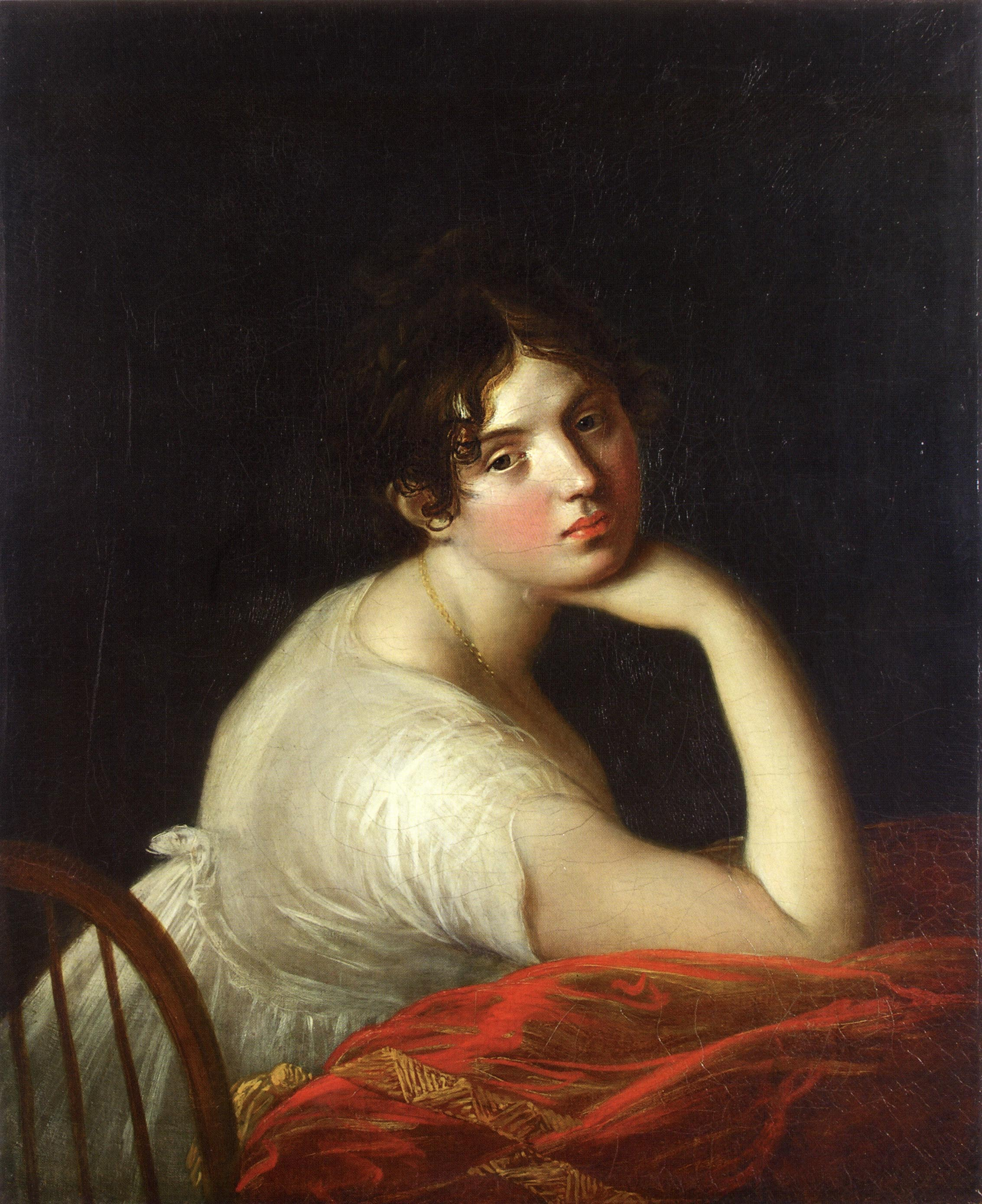
- Maria Naryshkina, by Salvatore Tonci
- Known for: Mistress of Alexander I of Russia
- Born: Princess Maria Czetwertyńska-Światopełk; 1779
- Died: 1854 (aged 74–75)
- Noble family: Czetwertyński
- Spouse: Dmitry Lvovich Naryshkin
- Issue: Marina Naryshkina; Yelizaveta Naryshkina; Yelizaveta Naryshkina; Zinaida Naryshkina; Sofia Naryshkina; Emanuel Naryshkin
- Father: Antoni Stanisław Czetwertyński-Światopełk
- Mother: Tekla von Kampenhausen

Maria Antonovna Naryshkina (Russian: Мария Антоновна Нарышкина; 1779–1854), born Princess Maria Czetwertyńska-Światopełk, was a Polish noblewoman who was the mistress of Tsar Alexander I of Russia for 19 years.

== Early life ==
Born into the House of Światopełk-Czetwertyński, she was the daughter of the Polish prince Antoni Stanisław Czetwertyński-Światopełk and his wife, Tekla von Kampenhausen (1750–1791).

== Biography ==
In 1795, she married Dmitry Lvovich Naryshkin (1758–1838), a hofmeister. In 1799, with her spouse's approval, she entered into a relationship with Alexander, who became tsar in 1801. She was well-liked by Alexander's family, except by his consort, the empress Elizabeth Alexeievna.

She is described as fascinating and charming, with the ability to attract people, and called "The Aspasia of the North". Phillip Vigel wrote that she had beauty "so perfect that it seemed impossible". In 1803, she made an attempt to have Alexander divorce his spouse and marry her, but she failed. She accompanied the tsar to the Vienna Congress in 1815, which gave him bad publicity.

She had at least four illegitimate daughters by Alexander. Three of them (two named Yelizaveta and one named Zinaida) died in infancy, and the other, Sofia, lived to aged 16. She also had a son, Emanuel, who wasn't admitted by her husband and was possibly also the tsar's child.

Her children were:

- Marina Naryshkina (1798 – 11 August 1871)
- Yelizaveta Naryshkina (born and died 1803) [The correct year of birth is 1802]
- Yelizaveta Naryshkina (born and died 1804) [The correct year of birth is 1803 and name is Elena]
- Zinaida Naryshkina (1806 – 18 May 1810)
- Sofia Naryshkina (1808 – 18 June 1824) [The correct year of birth is 1805]
- Emanuel Naryshkin (30 July 1813 – 31 December 1901)

Alexander was persuaded to leave her in 1818 and went back to his wife, Elizabeth. He continued to talk of her as his family.
