= Czetwertyński family =

Polish princely family of Ruthenian origin

Czetwertyński Chetvertynsky
- Coat of arms of the family
- Current region: Poland, Canada, Belgium
- Origin: Chetvertnia, Lutsk county, Volhynia

The House of Czetwertyński or Chetvertynsky (also Czetwertyński-Światopełk and Sviatopolk-Chetvertynsky) is a Polish princely family of Ruthenian origin that was founded under the Crown of the Kingdom of Poland in Volhynia, modern-day Ukraine. The family takes its name from the village of Chetvertnia, Lutsk county, in modern-day Manevychi Raion, Volyn Oblast.

== History ==
According to the family's legend, the progenitor of the family is the Grand Prince of Kyiv, Sviatopolk II. The first documented member of the family is Oleksander Chetvertynsky, who is mentioned in 1388. The family was accepted into the princely houses of Poland and Lithuania in 1569 and their Russian title of prince was confirmed in 1843.

In 1492, Prince Fedir Mykhailovych Chetvertynsky was the Lithuanian-Ruthenian ambassador to Wallachia. Over time, the family were Polonized and Catholicized, but some members remained adherent to the Eastern Orthodox religion.

Prince Stepan Sviatopolk-Chetvertynsky (1575–1659) played a key role in re-establishing the Ukrainian Orthodox Church of the Ecumenical Patriarchate of Constantinople in 1620. His son Mykola Sviatopolk-Chetvertynsky (?–1659) was a relative of the Hetman of Zaporizhian Host, Ivan Vyhovsky.

Two of the most notable representatives of the family were Hedeon Zakharovych Svyatopolk-Chetvertynsky, the Metropolitan of Kyiv, Galicia and all Little Russia in 1685–90, and Antoni Stanislaw's daughter Marie, who was Alexander I of Russia's mistress and had children by him. A nephew of Hedeon, Yurii Sviatopolk-Chetvertynsky (?-c. 1717–22), was a son-in-law of the Hetman of Zaporizhian Host, Ivan Samoylovych.

After Antoni Stanisław Czetwertyński-Światopełk was lynched in 1794 by Polish nationals in Warsaw during the Kościuszko Uprising, his family resettled in Saint Petersburg, in the Russian Empire. It received major land grants from Catherine the Great, such as the manor of Filimonki near Moscow.

== Belgian branch ==
By royal decree of King Albert II of Belgium, two members (both sons of Prince Michel Felix Swiatopelk-Czetwertynski and Kristina Sigurdsson) were recognised in the Belgian nobility with the rank of Prince.

- Alexandre Wladimir (Alex), Prince Swiatopelk-Czetwertynski (Ukkel, December 1975), new media artist married to DJ and sound healer Christine Renée Harrington (Austin, TX, December 1976). They have two children, Cassia Alexandra, Princess Swiatopelk-Czetwertynski (Los Angeles, CA, October 2008) and Rose Mary Renée (Rose )Princess Swiatopelk - Czetwertynski (New York, NY, June 2013)
- Constantin Nicolas (Tinko), Prince Swiatopelk-Czetwertynski (Brussels, 20 February 1978), a portrait and fashion photographer known as "Tinko Czetwertynski"

== Coat of arms ==
The family used the Pogoń Ruska coat of arms.

Smaller coat of arms of the Czetwertyński family used in the 16th century

Pogoń Ruska

== Notable members ==
- Antoni Stanisław Czetwertyński-Światopełk
- Gedeon Chetvertinsky, became a first Metropolitan of Kyiv appointed by Moscow in 1685
- Seweryn Franciszek Światopełk-Czetwertyński
- Sylvester Chetvertinsky, Orthodox bishop in the Polish–Lithuanian Commonwealth

== Palaces ==
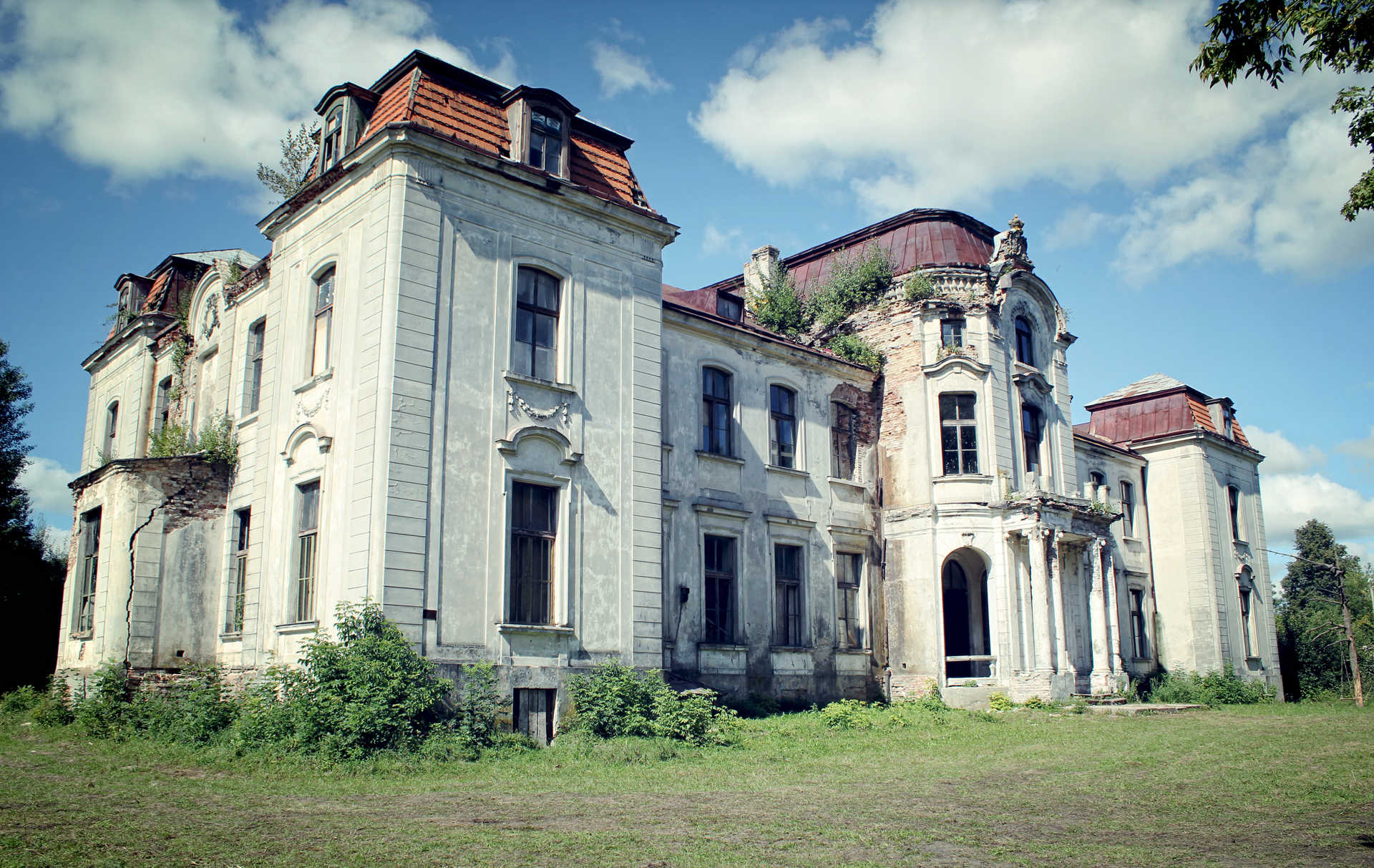
Palace in Żołudek

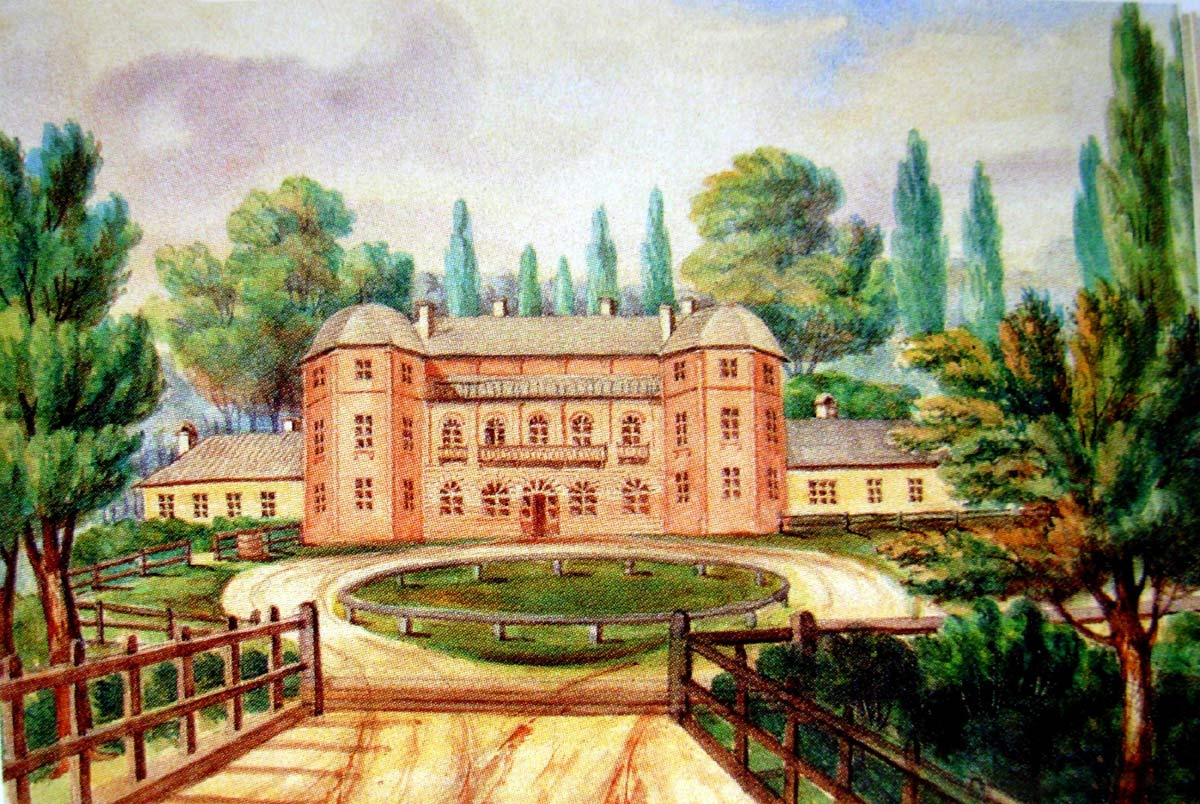
Czetwertyńsk Palace in Grodno

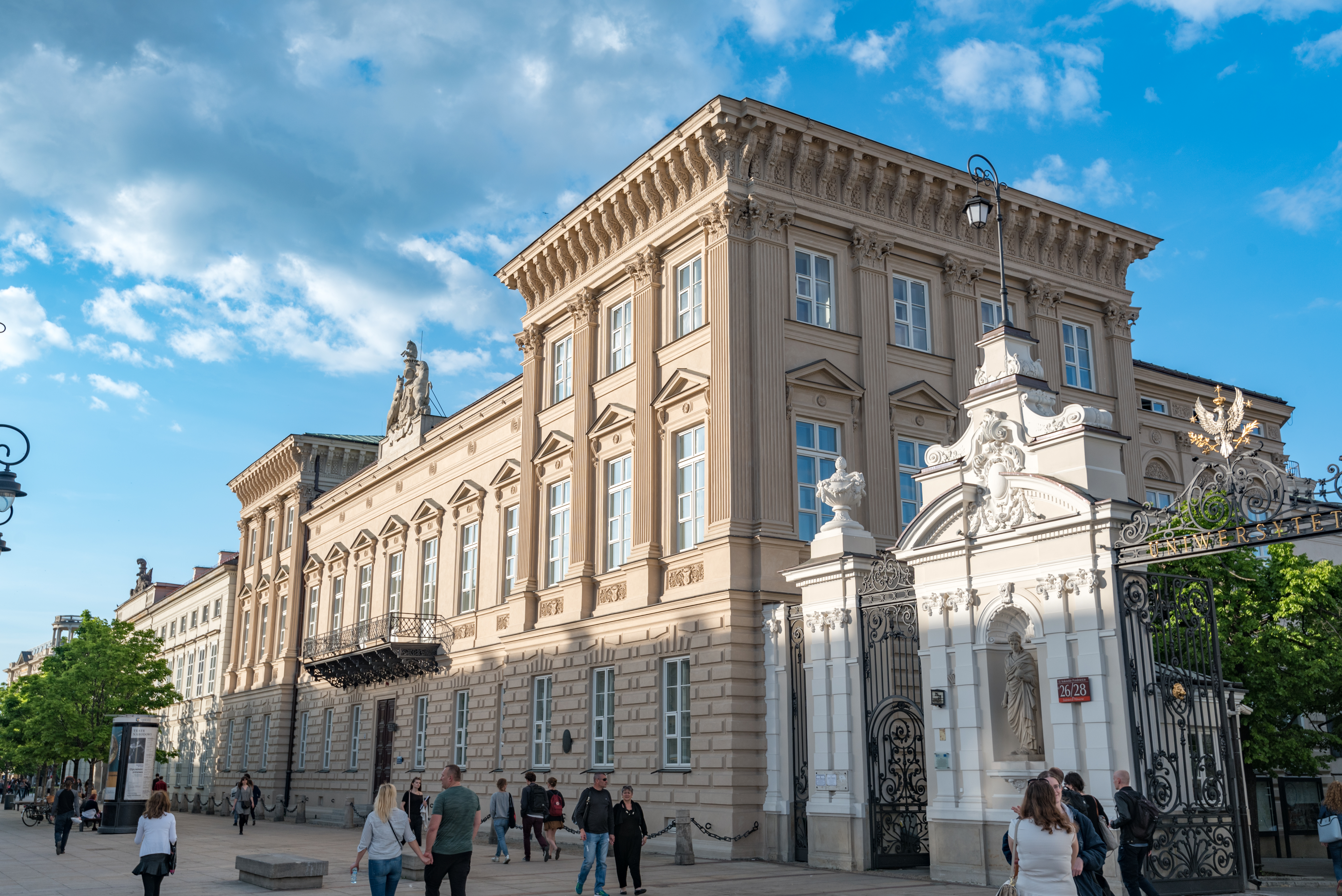
Uruski Palace in Warsaw, inherited in 1931 from Countess Maria Uruska, youngest child of Count Seweryn Uruski, Sas coat of arms (1817–1890); the palace now forms the University of Warsaw
