= Antoni Stanisław Czetwertyński-Światopełk =

Polish noble (1748–1794)

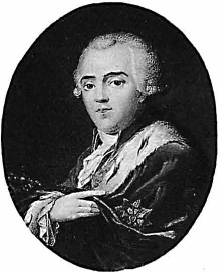
- Coat of arms: Pogoń Ruska
- Born: 1748
- Died: 1794 (age 46); Warsaw
- Family: Czetwertyński
- Spouses: Tekla Kampenhausen; Koleta Myszka-Chołoniewska h. Korczak
- Father: Włodzimierz Światopełk-Czetwertyński
- Mother: Teresa Szampach-Bośniacka

Prince Antoni Stanisław Czetwertyński-Światopełk (1748–1794) was a nobleman (szlachcic) and politician in the Polish–Lithuanian Commonwealth.

== Life and career ==
He was one of the Polish magnates who took the side of the Russian Empire, and a member of many Sejms, including the ones of 1772 and 1775, and the partition Sejm. He was a member of the commission negotiation the First Partition of Poland, an opponent of the Constitution of 3 May and a participant of the Confederation of Targowica. He was awarded the Order of Saint Stanislaw in 1785, and he was the Castellan of Przemyśl from 1790.

In the aftermath of the Warsaw Uprising during the Kościuszko Uprising, he was imprisoned by the Polish revolutionaries. On 28 June 1794, an angry mob stormed the prison, and he was hanged together with other people declared traitors, like bishop Ignacy Jakub Massalski. His family was smuggled to St. Petersburg, where his daughter Marie became a mistress of Alexander I of Russia.

== Remembrance ==
Światopełk is one of the figures immortalized in Jan Matejko's 1891 painting, Constitution of 3 May 1791.
