= Gaetano Piattoli =

Italian painter

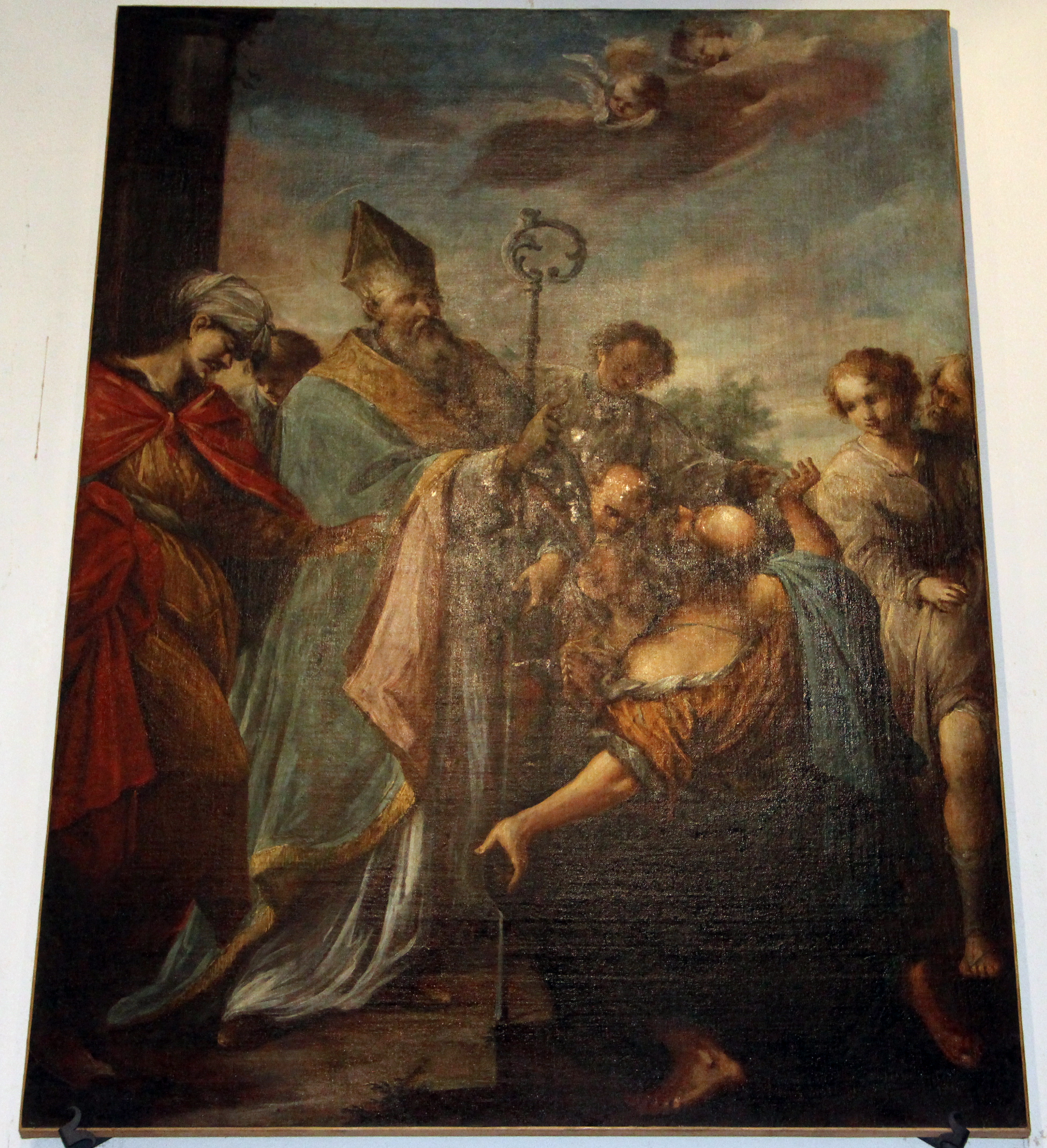
Miracle of St Blaise, attributed to Gaetano Piattoli, located in Vinci, Tuscany

Gaetano Piattoli (1703 – c. 1770) was an Italian painter, active mainly in Florence completing portraits.

== Biography ==
His son, Scipione Piattoli (10 November 1739 – 12 April 1809), was a priest, of the Piarist order, an educator, writer and political activist, and a major figure of the Enlightenment in Poland. His altarpiece of San Procolo heals a boy is displayed on the main altar of San Procolo, Florence. Gaetano trained with a French painter, Francesco Rivera, who lived in Livorno.

Gaetano's wife Anna was a pastel artist, and his son Giuseppe Piattoli was also a painter.
