= Jan Suchorzewski =

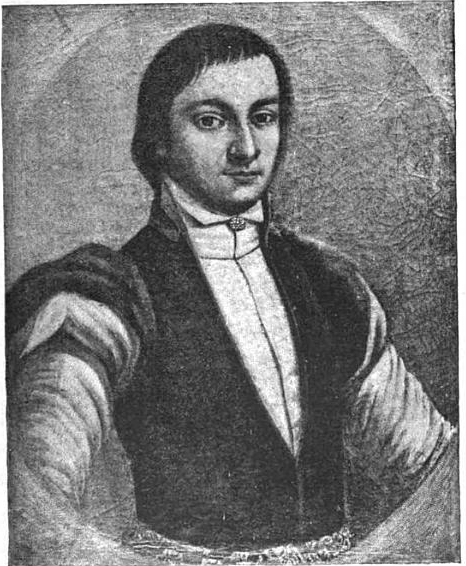
Portrait of Suchorzewski

Jan Suchorzewski (1740 or 1754 – 1804 or 1809)^{[a]} was a Polish noble of the Zaremba coat of arms, soldier and politician. He held the title of the wojski of Wschowa. He was a deputy from Gniezno to the Sejm (parliament) of 1786 and deputy from Kalisz to the Great Sejm of 1788-1792. He would be best remembered for his dramatic, theatrical gestures from that period. Kazimierz Bartoszewicz compared Suchorzewski's look and attitude to that of Zagłoba from Henryk Sienkiewicz's famous trilogy, if more misguided. He became an opponent of the reforms, and joined the Confederation of Targowica.

== Biography ==
Jan was born in 1740 or 1754 as the son of Jakub Suchorzewski and Jadwiga Zajączek. Around 1770 he married Joanna Przyjemska; they had three children.

During the Great Sejm Suchorzewski was at first a supporter of the Patriotic Party; in particular he supported the enlargement of the Polish–Lithuanian Commonwealth's army. In 1789 he published a brochure on the cities and law (Basics of urban laws - Zasady praw miejskich). However, he eventually switched sides and joined the Hetman Party opposed to the reforms. Around 18 January 1791 he criticized the recently premiered The Return of the Deputy (Powrót posła) comedy of Julian Ursyn Niemcewicz for its political content; his critique was not well received and he was ridiculed for it, losing prestige. Despite his opposition of many reforms, he nonetheless played a major, if perhaps not necessarily intentional, role in the passage of the Free Royal Cities Act in April 1791, as his rather unexpected involvement in the discussion boosted the supporters of the act and eased its passing. For that, the king rewarded him with the Order of Saint Stanislaus.

Suchorzewski unsuccessfully attempted to prevent the king from signing the Constitution of 3 May, blocking his way and threatening to kill his own son to save him from the "slavery of the Constitution".^{[b]} In this way he repeated, in an infamous, or tragicomic way, the gesture of Tadeusz Rejtan. This incident was immortalized on Jan Matejko's painting Constitution of May 3, 1791. From Suchorzewski's pocket, a deck of cards has fallen out, an allusion to the way he was bribed by the Hetman Party leaders, Russian ambassador Otto Magnus von Stackelberg and hetman Branicki. Later, he would publish a critique of the constitution in the brochure Uwagi nad konstytucją polską 3 maja 1791 (Notes on the Polish Constitution of 3 May 1791) and Odezwa do narodu wraz z protestacyją dla Śladu Gwałtu i Przemocy, do której prawie w całym Sejmie zbliżano, a w dniu 3 maja 1791 dokonano (A Declaration to the Nation with a Protestation for the Evidence of Rape and Violence which was Planned throughout most of the Sejm and on day 3 May 1791 Carried out).

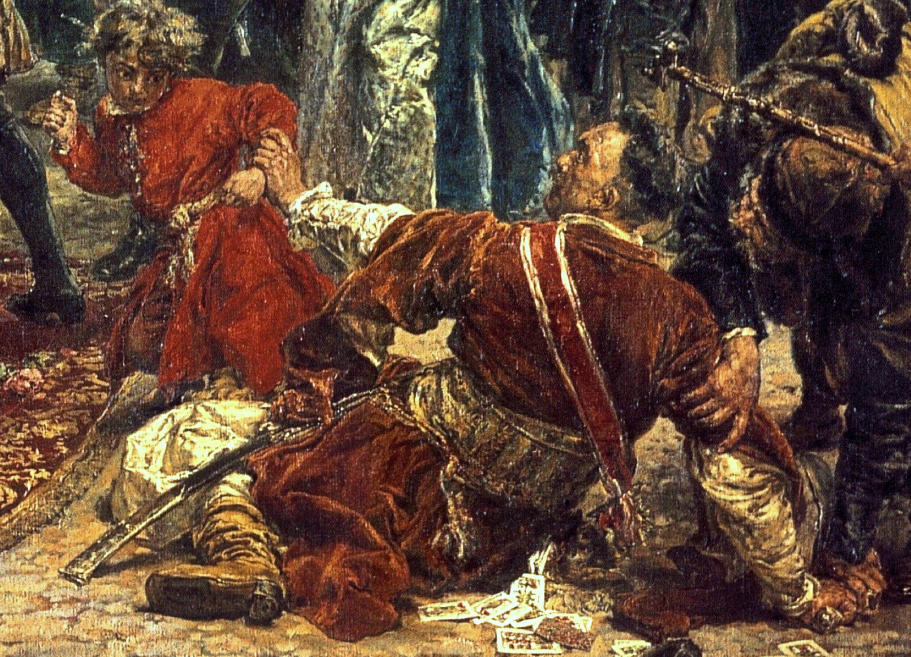
Suchorzewski on Jan Matejko's painting Constitution of May 3, 1791

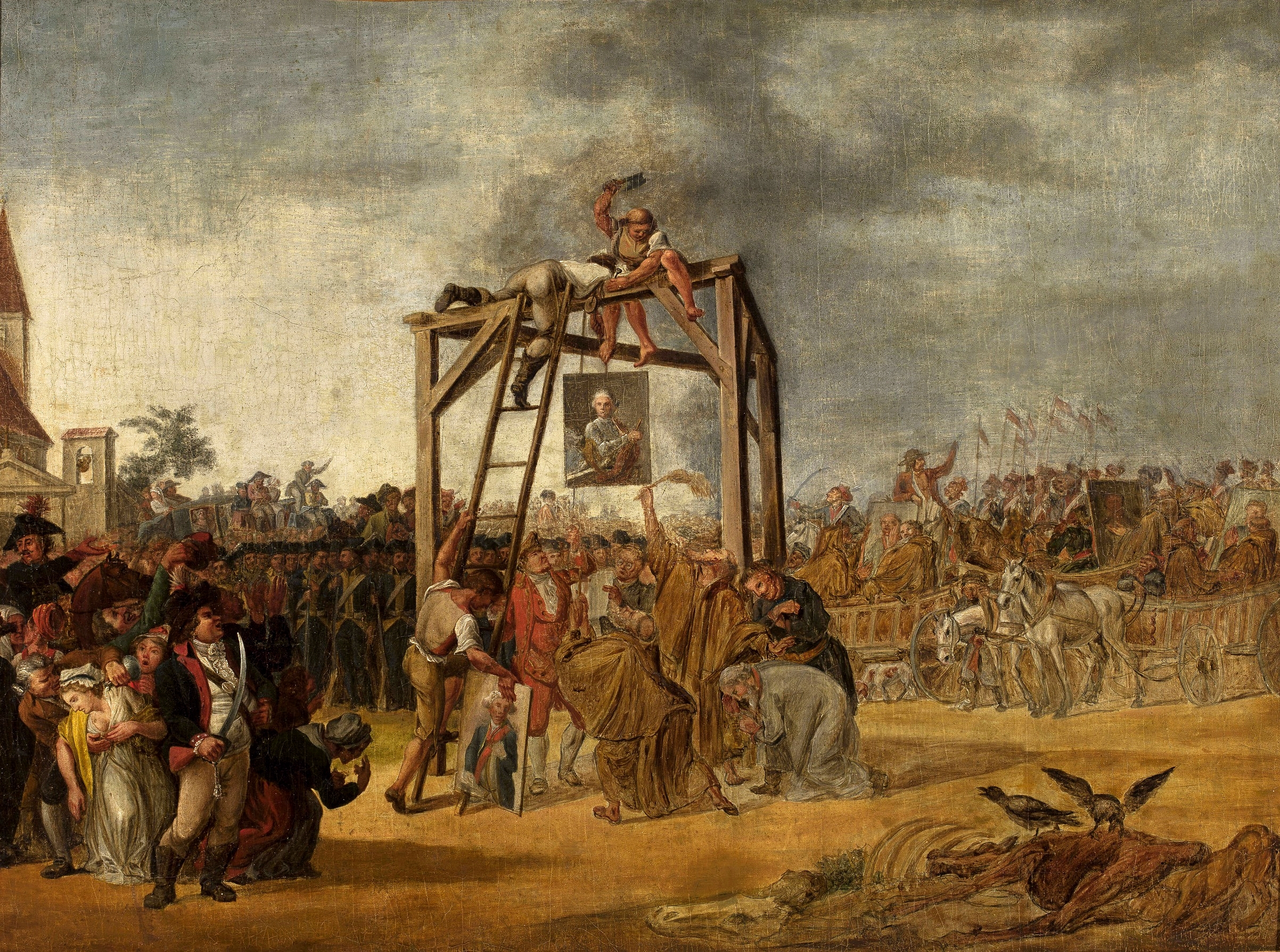
Hanging in effigy of the leaders of Targowica Confederation, Warsaw, 1794, in the aftermath of the Warsaw Uprising. Painting by Jan Piotr Norblin.

Suchorzewski, with several other opponents of the constitution, departed to Saint Petersburg in the Russian Empire, where he became one of the founding members and high-ranking officials (konsyliarz) of the Confederation of Targowica. Derdej speculated that out of all those who signed the act of the Confederation, Suchorzewski was the only one who might have thought they were really acting in the country's best interest. He commanded a cavalry brigade in the Confederation forces during the War in Defense of the Constitution that the Confederates eventually won, overthrowing the Constitution. During the Kościuszko Insurrection he was sentenced, in absentia, to a death by hanging, eternal infamy, loss of all titles and confiscation of possessions. His effigy was hanged on 29 September 1794.

== Notes ==
a Sources vary with regards to his dates of birth and death. Rabowicz and Maksimowicz, as well as Jezierski, give them as 1740-1809. However, the Polski Słownik Biograficzny gives them as 1754-1804 or 1809.

b There are several different versions of the story, which could be explained by the fact that Suchorzewski was known for theatrical gestures and declarations, some of which might have been differently described by contemporary sources (which could have conflated several incidents into one). Bartoszewski cites several versions and incidents of Suchorzewski's theatrics. In one, Suchorzewski would threaten his son upon return to his house, causing a large commotion there. In another, Suchorzewski would simply declare his intention, without even moving to threaten his son. In yet another one, that Bartoszewski describes three times in a slightly different fashion, Suchorzewski would try to block the king's way, imitating Reytan's gesture, but without involving his son. At another time, he would crawl on the parliament's floor, and deliver a speech in this fashion, an incident which caused the bishop Adam Krasiński to demand that "somebody take this insane person to the asylum".
