= Seweryn Franciszek Światopełk-Czetwertyński =

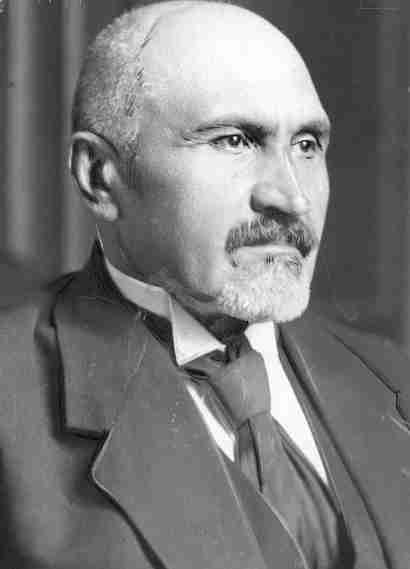
- Coat of arms: Pogoń Ruska
- Born: 18 April 1873; Warsaw, Congress Poland
- Died: 19 June 1945 (aged 72); Edinburgh, Scotland
- Family: Czetwertyński
- Wife: Zofia Barbara Przeździecka h. Pierzchała
- Father: Włodzimierz Czetwertyński-Światopełk
- Mother: Maria Wanda Felicja Urska h. Sas
- Occupation: Entrepreneur; landowner; politician

Prince Seweryn Franciszek Światopełk-Czetwertyński (Polish pronunciation: [sɛˈvɛrɨn fraɲˈt͡ɕiʂɛk ɕfjaˈtɔpɛwk t͡ʂɛtfɛrˈtɨj̃skʲi]; Russian: Севери́н Влади́мирович Святопо́лк-Четверти́нский; 18 April 1873 – 19 June 1945) was a Polish landowner, entrepreneur and politician. He belonged to a cadet branch of the Czetwertyński family, historically one of the princely houses of Poland and Lithuania.

He was a pupil at the Realschule in Riga and was a member of the Polish student fraternity Arkonia. He went on to study at the University of Bonn.

He became a member of the Russian Duma in 1906, and after Poland had regained its independence, he was elected to the Sejm from 1919 until 1935. During World War II, he was a prisoner of Nazi Germany, and was imprisoned at Buchenwald and Auschwitz concentration camps. He died of exhaustion barely two months after liberation, having newly arrived in the United Kingdom.

Światopełk-Czetwertyński was married to Zofia Przeździecka; their son Włodzimierz (1907–1965) and elder grandchildren were born in Poland, but during World War II, they fled to Britain, eventually taking up residence in North America.
