= Chetvertnia =

Village in Volyn Oblast, Ukraine

Coordinates: 51°02′41″N 25°28′31″E

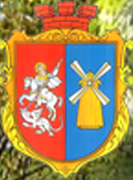
Coat of arms

Chetvertnia (Ukrainian: Четвертня, Polish: Czetwertnia) is a village in Volyn Oblast, Ukraine. The village is famous for being the estate of the Czetwertyński family.

In the 15th–17th centuries the village was considered a city.

In 1437 Oleksandr Chetvertynsky established in a city Transfiguration Monastery. Sometime at the end of 16th century the city belonged to the House of Zbaraski when Prince Janusz Zbaraski married Hanna Czetwertyńska. In 1604 here was established a church Transfiguration of Our Lord. Upon extinguishing of House of Zbaraski family line, the estate was returned to Czetwertyński family.
