= Anna Bacherini Piattoli =

Italian artist (1720–1788)

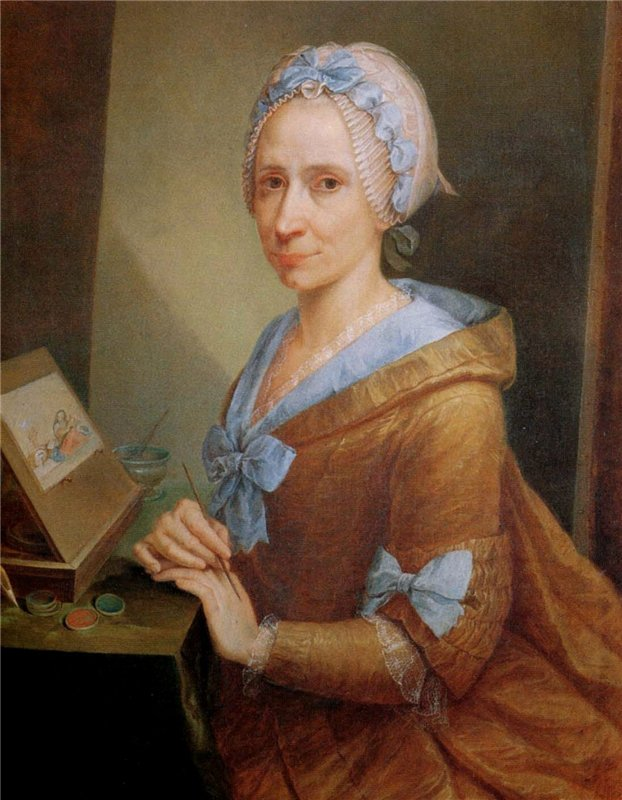
Self-Portrait (1776)

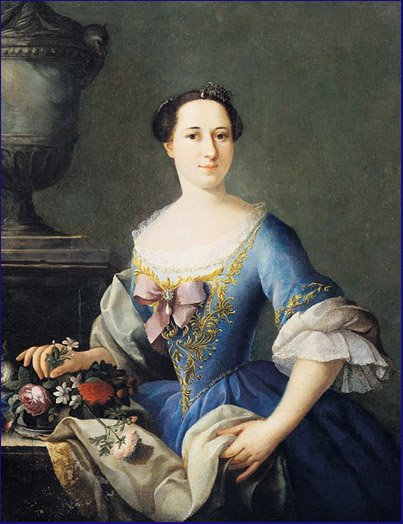
Teresa da Verrazzano, née Vai

Anna Bacherini Piattoli (1720, Florence – 1788, Florence) was an Italian painter.

== Biography ==
She studied with Francesco Ciaminghi (?-1736), Francesco Conti, and Violante Beatrice Siries. During this time, she attracted the attention of Niccolò Gabburri, a diplomat who was also an art collector. He notes that her portraits were very popular and that she was associated with the Accademia di San Luca. He also compared her to Rosalba Carriera.

In 1741, she married the painter Gaetano Piattoli. Their son, Giuseppe, also became a painter, while another son, Scipione, was a Piarist priest who played a major role in the Polish Enlightenment.

She specialized in portrait miniatures and pastels for a living, but also produced some deeply felt religious scenes. Although she received numerous commissions from the Grand Dukes of Tuscany, few of her works remain and many are in need of restoration; notably a Saint Francis held at the San Salvi Museum.

A few large portraits are among her surviving works, including a self-portrait from 1776 at the Uffizi Gallery. It depicts her copying the "Madonna del Sacco", a work by Andrea del Sarto. The gallery of the Palazzo Comunale in Prato has a portrait of Teresa da Verrazzano, née Vai, dating from 1753.

The Uffizi also has two earlier self-portraits, one with her husband Gaetano in the background, from 1745. Two religious portraits attributed to her, of Padre Giovanni di Gesù e Maria (1564–1615) and Padre Ildefonso di San Luis Gonzaga (1724–1792), are in the possession of the Uffizi, but have never been publicly displayed.
