= Józef Stępkowski =

Polish politician

member of Sejm 2005-2007
- In office 25 September 2005 – 2007

Personal details
- Born: 1970 (age 55–56)
- Party: Samoobrona

Józef Stępkowski (born 13 April 1970 in Ząbkowice Śląskie) is a Polish politician. He was elected to the Sejm on 25 September 2005, getting 8,714 votes in 21 Opole district as a candidate from Samoobrona Rzeczpospolitej Polskiej list. Since 2016, he's a chairman of the stud farm in Prudnik.

== See also ==
- Members of Polish Sejm 2005-2007
