= Emanuel Rostworowski =

Polish historian and professor

Emanuel Mateusz Rostworowski (8 January 1923, in Kraków – 8 October 1989, in Kraków) was a Polish historian, professor at Kraków's Jagiellonian University, and member of the Polish Academy of Sciences.

He specialized in 18th-century history.

In 1965-89 he was editor-in-chief of Polski Słownik Biograficzny.

He was a son of Karol Hubert Rostworowski.

== Books ==
- Historia powszechna – wiek XVIII, Warszawa 1977.
- Sprawa aukcji wojska na tle sytuacji politycznej przed Sejmem Czteroletnim, Warszawa 1957.
- O polską koronę. Polityka Francji w latach 1725-1733, 1958.
- Legendy i fakty XVIII wieku, Warszawa 1963.
- Ostatni król Rzeczypospolitej. Geneza i upadek Konstytucji 3 maja, Warszawa 1966.
- Popioły i korzenie. Szkice historyczne i rodzinne, Kraków 1985.
