= Giuseppe Piattoli =

Italian painter

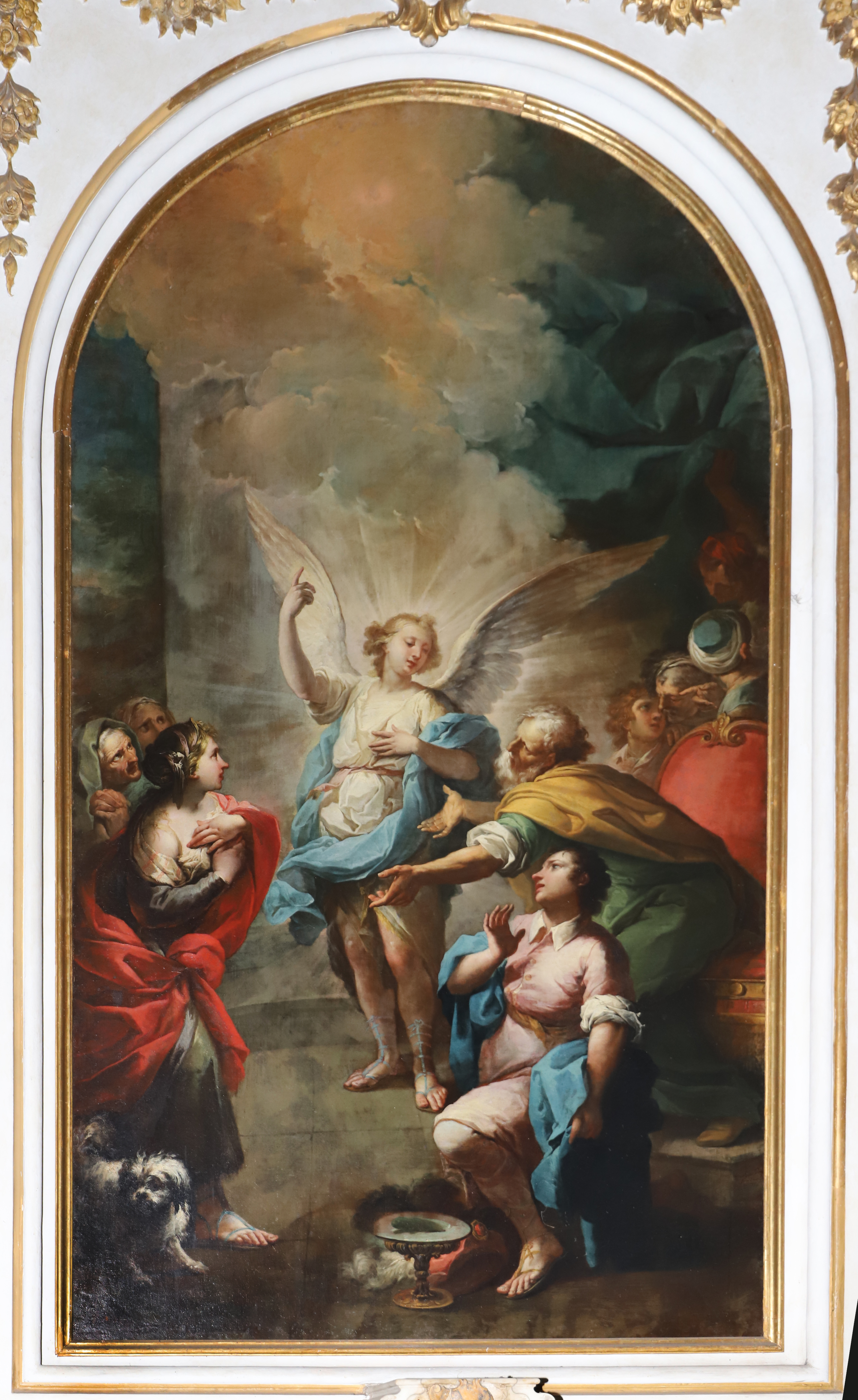
Archangel Raphael appearing to the people, 1775, Florence, Santa Maria Maddalena de' Pazzi

Giuseppe Piattoli the Younger (1748 – 1834) was an Italian painter and engraver, active mainly in Florence.

His brother Gaetano and his mother, Anna Bacherini Piattoli, were painters. His father, Giuseppe Piattoli the elder was an engraver, active for a time in Sardinia. He is thought to have trained portrait artist Anna Tonelli.

There are works by Servolini in the church of Santa Maria Maddalena dei Pazzi. He engraved a series of the Miracles of the miracles of the 16th-century Dominican mystic Bartolomea Bagnesi. He was appointed by Grand Duke of Tuscany, Peter Leopold to posts at the Real Galleria and the Accademia di Belle Arti of Florence.
