= Antoni Przeborski =

Polish mathematician (1871–1941)

- Born: Antoni Bonifacy Przeborski; 27 May 1871; Chorosza, near Lipovets, Kiev Governorate, Russian Empire (now in Ukraine)
- Died: 24 May 1941 (aged 69); Warsaw, German-occupied Poland
- Education: Saint Vladimir University, Kyiv
- Awards: Rachmaninoff Prize (1895)
- Scientific career
- Fields: Mathematics, theoretical mechanics
- Workplaces: Kharkiv University; University of Warsaw

Antoni Bonifacy Przeborski (27 May 1871 – 24 May 1941) was a Polish mathematician. He was a professor at Kharkiv University in the Russian Empire and was elected rector of that institution. From 1922 until 1939 he occupied the chair of theoretical mechanics at the University of Warsaw in the Second Polish Republic.

== Education and early career ==
Przeborski was born on 27 May 1871 in Chorosza (near Lipovets), which was part of the Russian Empire at the time and is now located in Ukraine. After completing his secondary education and earning a gold medal from the gymnasium in Nikolaev, where his father worked as a physician for the Black Sea Fleet, he attended the Faculty of Physics and Mathematics at Saint Vladimir University in Kyiv. In 1895 he won the Professor I. I. Rachmaninoff Prize for his work titled On the methods of Abel, Jacobi, Liouville and Weierstrass in the theory of elliptic functions. Additionally, he studied at the universities of Moscow, Göttingen and Heidelberg.

== Kharkiv ==
In 1905 Przeborski became a professor at Kharkiv University; in 1908 he became an ordinary professor of mathematics there. He was elected rector of Kharkiv University, and during the Polish–Soviet War he was taken into custody by the Soviet authorities as a "Polish hostage". In August 1921 Przeborski submitted an application to the Polish Ministry of Religious Denominations and Public Education for help obtaining permission to move permanently to Poland.

== Warsaw ==
Przeborski was one of the mathematicians who left the former Russian Empire for Poland after the revolution. In 1921 he was for a short time an ordinary professor at Stefan Batory University in Vilnius; in 1922 he moved to Warsaw with the help of Wacław Sierpiński, where he was elected ordinary professor in the Department of Theoretical Mechanics at the University of Warsaw. He held the theoretical mechanics chair until 1939.

Since 1923 he was a member of the Polish Academy of Learning, and since 1930 of the Warsaw Scientific Society. Przeborski died in Warsaw on 24 May 1941.

== Scientific work ==
Przeborski's research was done in fields such as analytic and real functions, integral equations, differential geometry, and applications of mathematics. The research he conducted in Poland was mostly related to classical mechanics.

== Selected works ==
- Wykłady mechaniki teoretycznej [Lectures on Theoretical Mechanics], vols. I–II. Warsaw, 1930–1935.
