= Staszic Palace =

Coordinates: 52°14′16″N 21°01′06″E

Staszic Palace Pałac Staszica (in Polish)
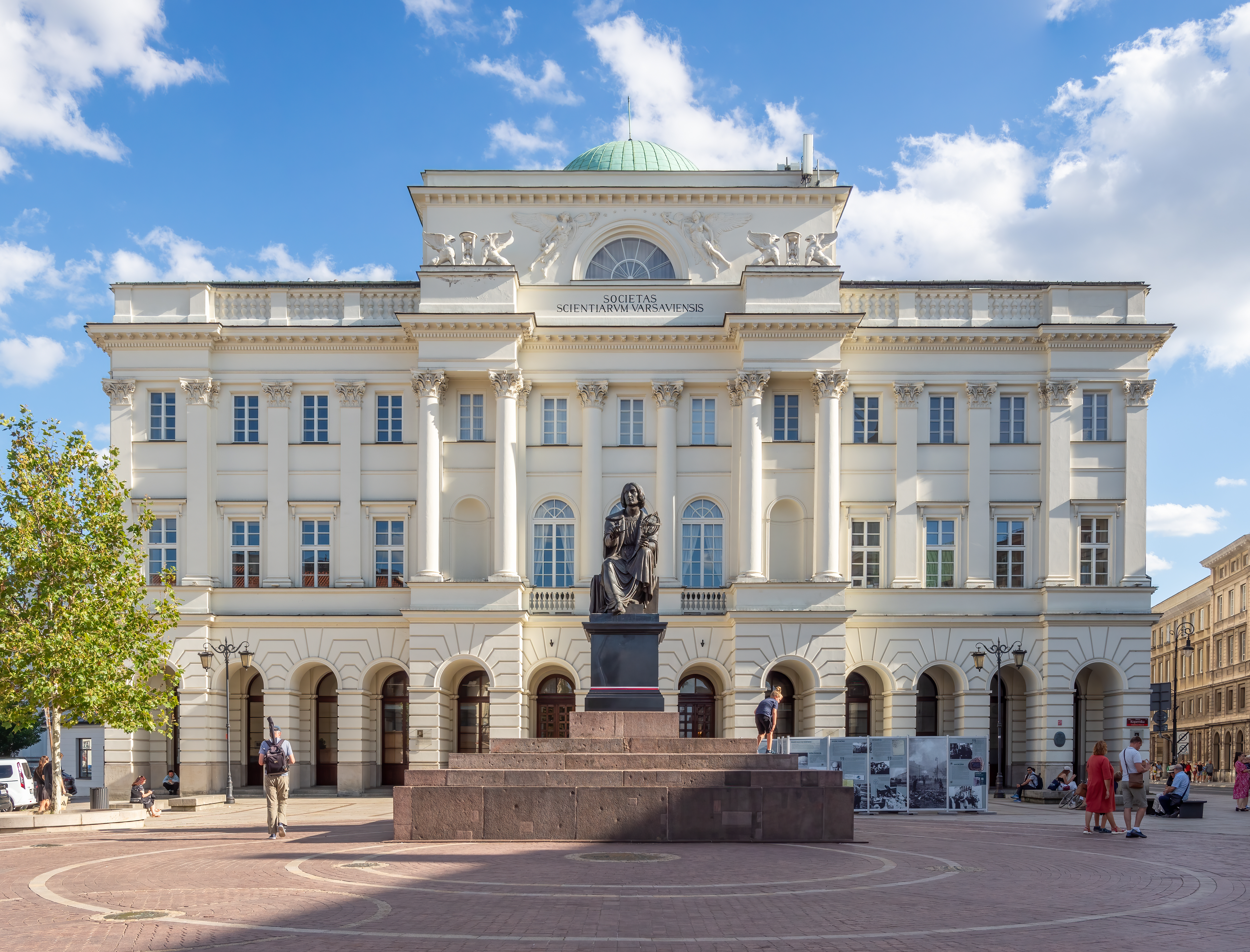
- Staszic Palace, seat of the Polish Academy of Sciences

General information
- Architectural style: Neoclassical
- Location: Warsaw, Poland
- Construction started: 1620
- Completed: 1946–1950

Design and construction
- Architect: Antonio Corazzi

Other information
- Public transit: Nowy Świat-Uniwersytet

Historic Monument of Poland
- Designated: 1994-09-08
- Part of: Warsaw – historic city center with the Royal Route and Wilanów
- Reference no.: M.P. 1994 nr 50 poz. 423

Staszic Palace (Polish: Pałac Staszica, IPA: [ˈpawat͡s staˈʂit͡sa]) is an edifice at Nowy Świat Street in Warsaw, Poland. It is the seat of the Polish Academy of Sciences.

== History ==
=== Origin ===
The history of the Staszic Palace dates from 1620, when King Sigismund III of Poland ordered the construction of a small Eastern Orthodox chapel, as an appropriate burial place for the former Tsar Vasili IV of Russia and his brother, Dmitry Shuisky, who had died in Polish custody after having been captured several years earlier during the Polish–Russian War of 1605–1618.

As the Polish capital's population was mostly Catholic, Protestant or Jewish, there was little call for an Orthodox chapel, and in 1668 another Polish king, John II Casimir, transferred the chapel to the Dominican Order, who were caretakers of the building until 1808.

=== 19th century ===
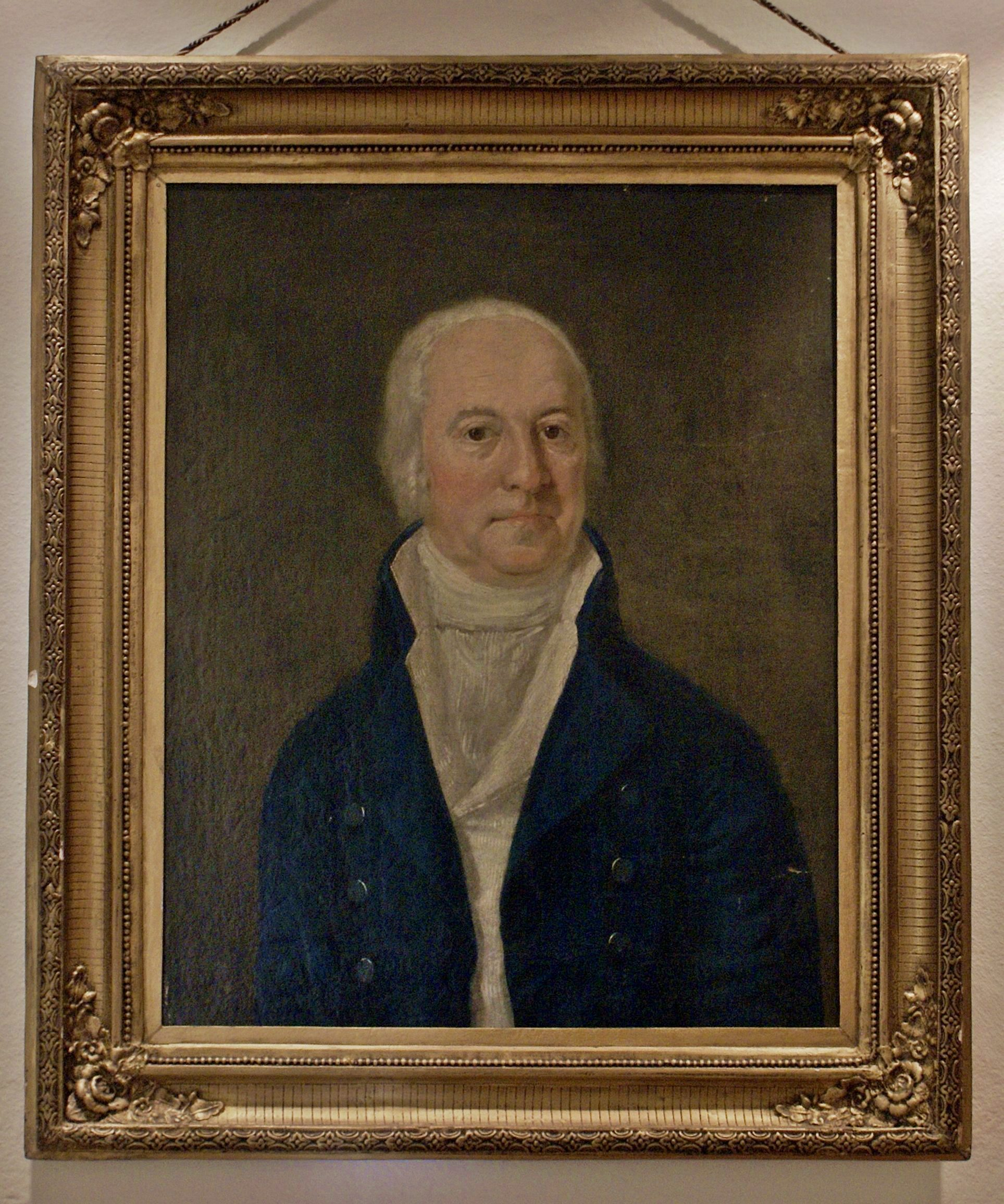
Stanisław Staszic in 1820

In 1818 the building was purchased by Stanisław Staszic, a leading figure of the Polish Enlightenment, who commissioned its renovation. The architect in charge was Antonio Corazzi, who redesigned the palace in neoclassical style. After the renovation (1820–23), Staszic donated the building to the Society of Friends of Science, the first Polish learned society dedicated to Science, founded in 1800.

On 11 May 1830 the diplomat and polymath, Julian Ursyn Niemcewicz, unveiled Bertel Thorvaldsen's monument to Nicolaus Copernicus in front of the palace.

After the November 1830 Uprising against the occupying Russian Empire, the Society was banned by the Russian authorities; they had controlled Warsaw for most of the time since the final partition of Poland in 1795. For the following 26 years, the palace was used by the organisers of a lottery.

In 1857–62 the palace was the seat of the Academy of Medical science, the first institution of higher learning re-established in the Russian partition (all institutions of higher learning having been banned following the 1830 Uprising); but the Academy was soon closed after yet another failed insurrection, the 1863-4 "January Uprising".

Until the end of World War I, the building housed a gymnasium. From 1890 it was the site of an Orthodox church. In 1892–93 the palace was renovated by the Russian authorities. In line with the ongoing Russification of Warsaw, architect Volodymyr Pokrovskyi remodelled the palace in Russo-Byzantine style.

=== 20th century ===
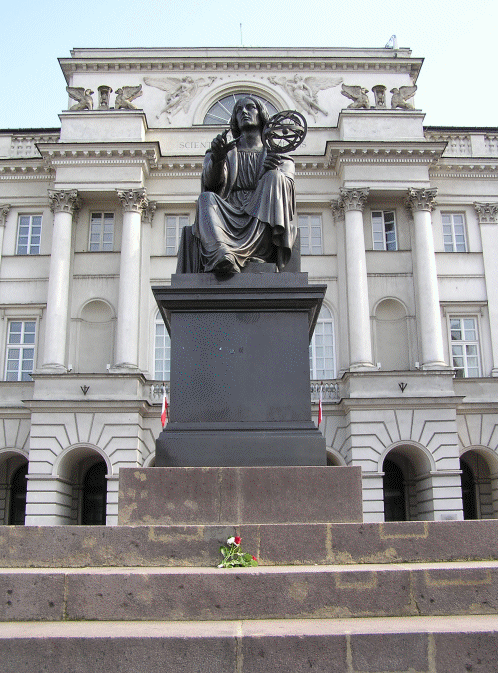
Copernicus with armillary sphere, in front of the Staszic Palace

After Poland regained independence in 1918, in 1924–26 the palace was brought back to a Polish Neoclassical style by architect Marian Lalewicz, similar to its original design. In the Interbellum it hosted several scientific and scholarly organizations: the Warsaw Scientific Society, the Mianowski Fund, the National Meteorological Institute, the French Institute, and the State Archaeological Museum in Warsaw.

The palace was damaged during the 1939 siege of Warsaw and nearly razed during the 1944 Warsaw Uprising. In 1946–1950 it was rebuilt in its original neoclassical form by Piotr Biegański who introduced minor modifications to the building's original design. Today it is the seat of the Polish Academy of Sciences.

== See also ==
- Architecture of Poland
- List of palaces in Poland
- Nicolaus Copernicus Monument, Warsaw
