= Volodymyr Pokrovskyi =

Ukrainian architect (1863–1924)

Volodymyr Mykolayovych Pokrovskyi
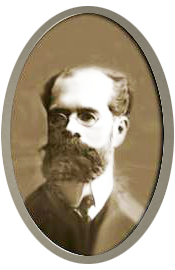
- Born: Покровський Володимир Миколайович; 1864; Kamianets-Podilskyi, Russian Empire
- Died: 4 April 1924 (aged 59–60); Kharkiv, Ukrainian SSR
- Education: Imperial Academy of Arts
- Occupation: Architect
- Practice: architect, educator, professor

Volodymyr Mykolayovych Pokrovskyi (Ukrainian: Володимир Миколайович Покровський, 1864, Kamianets-Podilskyi – 4 April 1924, Kharkiv) was a Ukrainian and Polish architect of the Russian Empire, diocesan architect of the Kharkiv Eparchy (1907–1917), educator, and professor.

== Biography ==
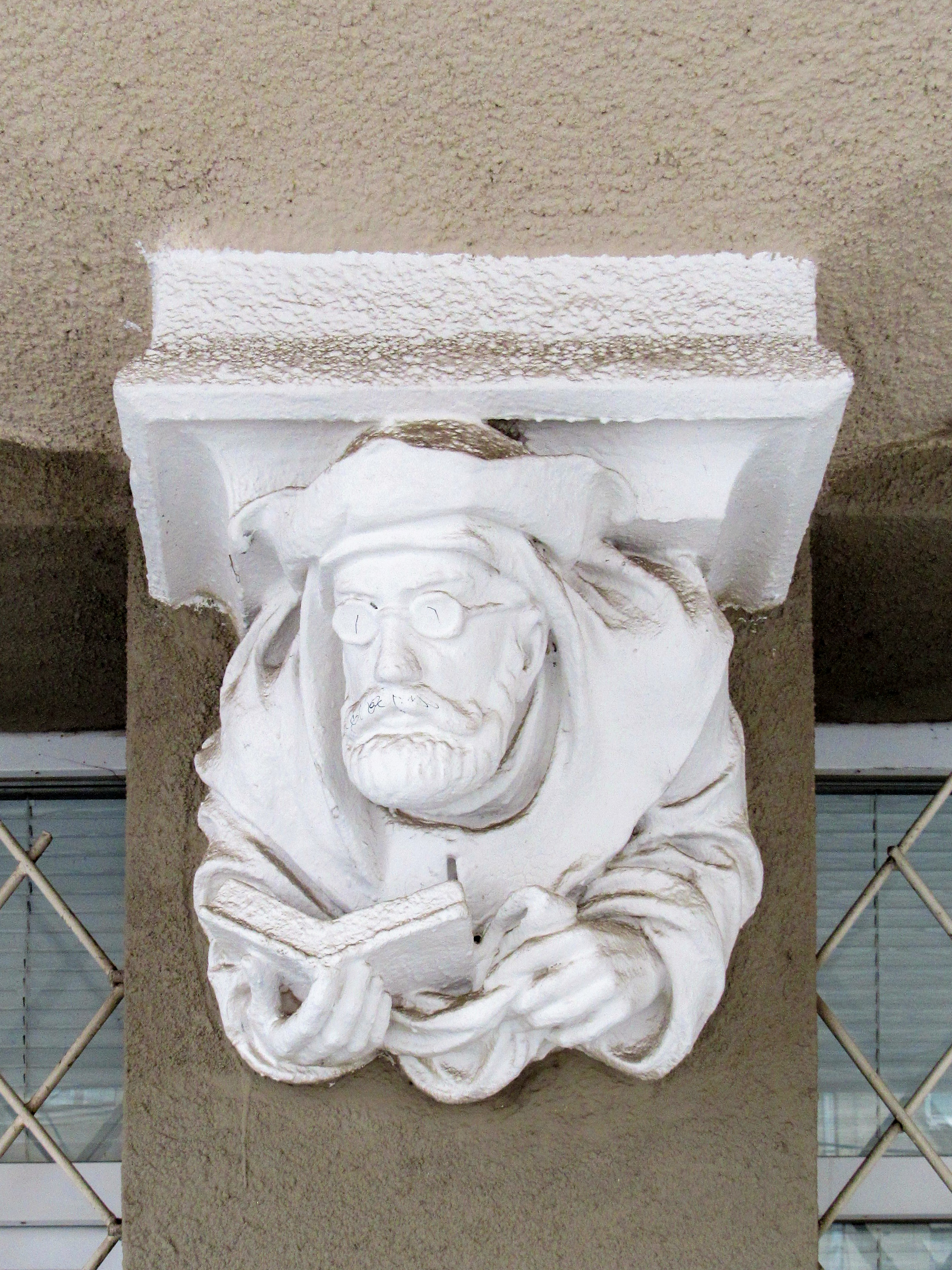
Sculpture of architect Pokrovskyi on the "House with Chimeras" in Kharkiv

Volodymyr Mykolayovych Pokrovskyi was born in 1864 in the city of Kamianets-Podilskyi. He graduated from the Imperial Academy of Arts in Saint Petersburg in 1888, receiving a gold medal. For his work "Embassy House," he was awarded the title of Class I Artist in 1890. After completing his studies, he worked for some time in Warsaw. Initially, he held the position of architect for the Warsaw-Chełm Eparchy, but left it following the revolutionary events of 1905 due to threats to his family's safety. He then worked for a time at the Moscow Land Survey Office. In 1906, he appealed to Archbishop Arsenii of Kharkiv with a request to be appointed diocesan architect. After the prolonged illness and subsequent death of his predecessor, architect Volodymyr Khrystianovych Niemkin, he was appointed to the position in 1907.

From the beginning of his activity in Kharkiv, Pokrovskyi became an active participant in the city's urban development. His first project was the Church of the Three Holy Hierarchs (Holberg Church). Later, he designed the bell tower of the Myronosytska Church, as well as the buildings of the Diocesan Museum, a library, a hotel, a private girls' gymnasium, and a number of mansions and apartment buildings. Pokrovskyi gained a reputation as an active and demanding architect: he purchased an automobile for travel throughout the governorate and became a member of the South Russian Automobile Club. He was one of the first Kharkiv residents to be fined for violating traffic regulations.

In 1909, Pokrovskyi decided to construct an income-generating apartment building in which he and his family would reside. Construction was completed in 1911, but due to financial difficulties, he sold the building to Heorhii Pitre in 1913, retaining one of the apartments as a tenant.

From 1917, Pokrovskyi left his position as diocesan architect and began working alongside Academician Oleksiy Mykolayovych Beketov in the Consumer Society of Southern Russia. During the rule of the Volunteer Army, he served as a member of the Kharkiv City Duma, representing the Progressive Party. In the autumn of 1919, he delivered lectures (“Fundamentals of Masonry Construction”) at the Free Faculty of Arts, chaired by Professor F. Schmitt. In 1921, Pokrovskyi was accused of collaboration with the Volunteer Army, but all charges were later dropped. With his involvement, the architectural faculty of the Kharkiv Art Institute was established, and he was appointed professor there in 1922. From 1917 until his death, he also taught at the Kharkiv Technological Institute.

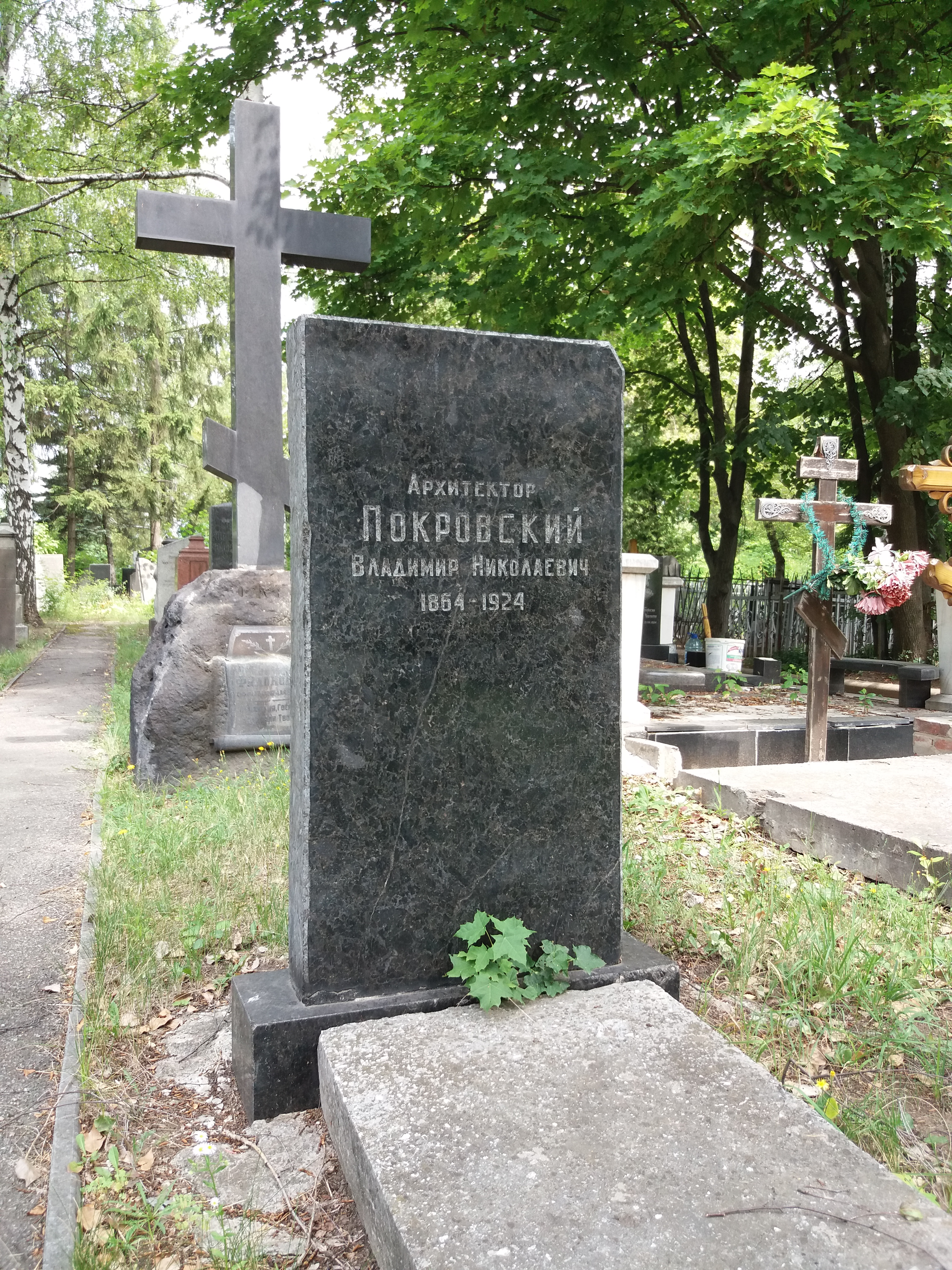
Grave of V. Pokrovskyi at the 13th City Cemetery

Volodymyr Pokrovskyi died on 4 April 1924. He was originally buried at the Ivano-Usiknenskyi Cemetery, but after its demolition, his grave was relocated to the 13th City Cemetery. His grave is designated a local heritage site (protection number 3267-KhA).

== Legacy ==
A number of notable buildings in Kharkiv were constructed according to Pokrovskyi’s designs, including the building of the Historical Museum (currently transferred to a monastery). In addition, he designed churches in numerous settlements across the Kharkiv Governorate, including the Ascension Church in the village of Borshchivka in 1913. His architectural works can also be found in the Sumy, Kyiv, and Luhansk regions. In Warsaw Pokrovskyi was the author of the Veterinary Institute complex (built: 1898–1900), the Church of Saint Olga (built: 1902–1903) and the reconstruction of the Staszic Palace in the Byzantine-Russian style (1892–93) (the building's original appearance was restored in 1924).

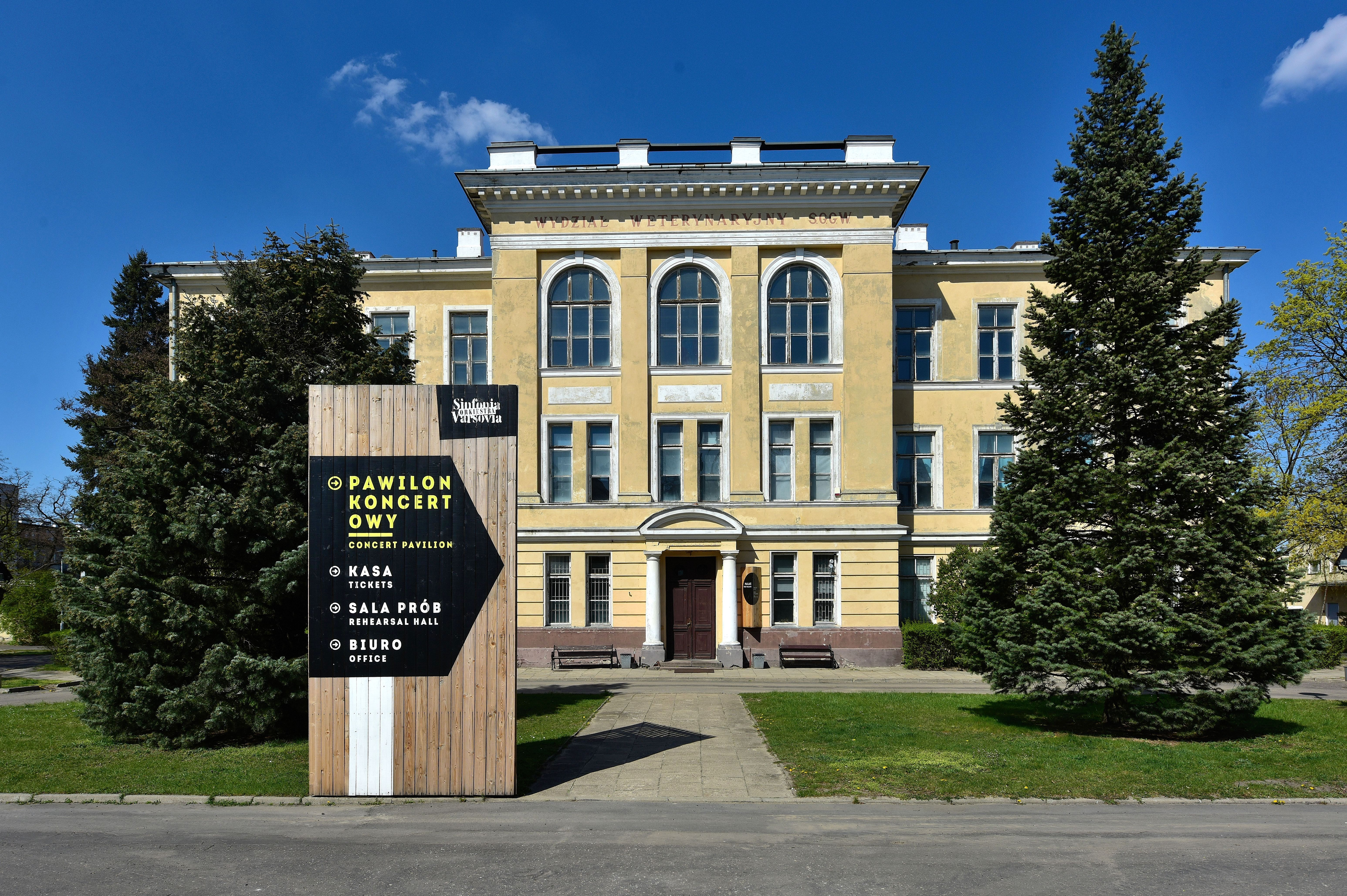
Main building of the Veterinary Institute, Warsaw

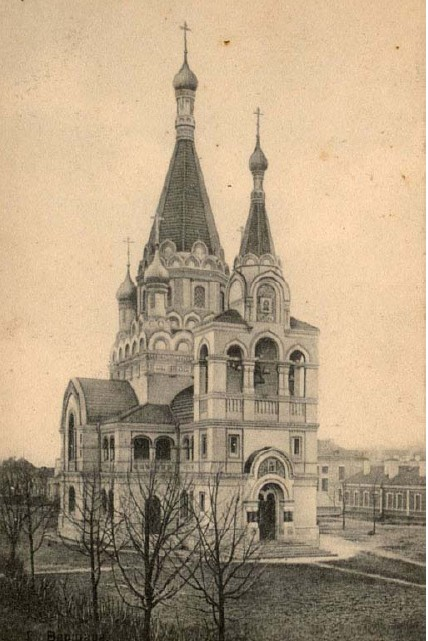
St. Olga's Church, Warsaw

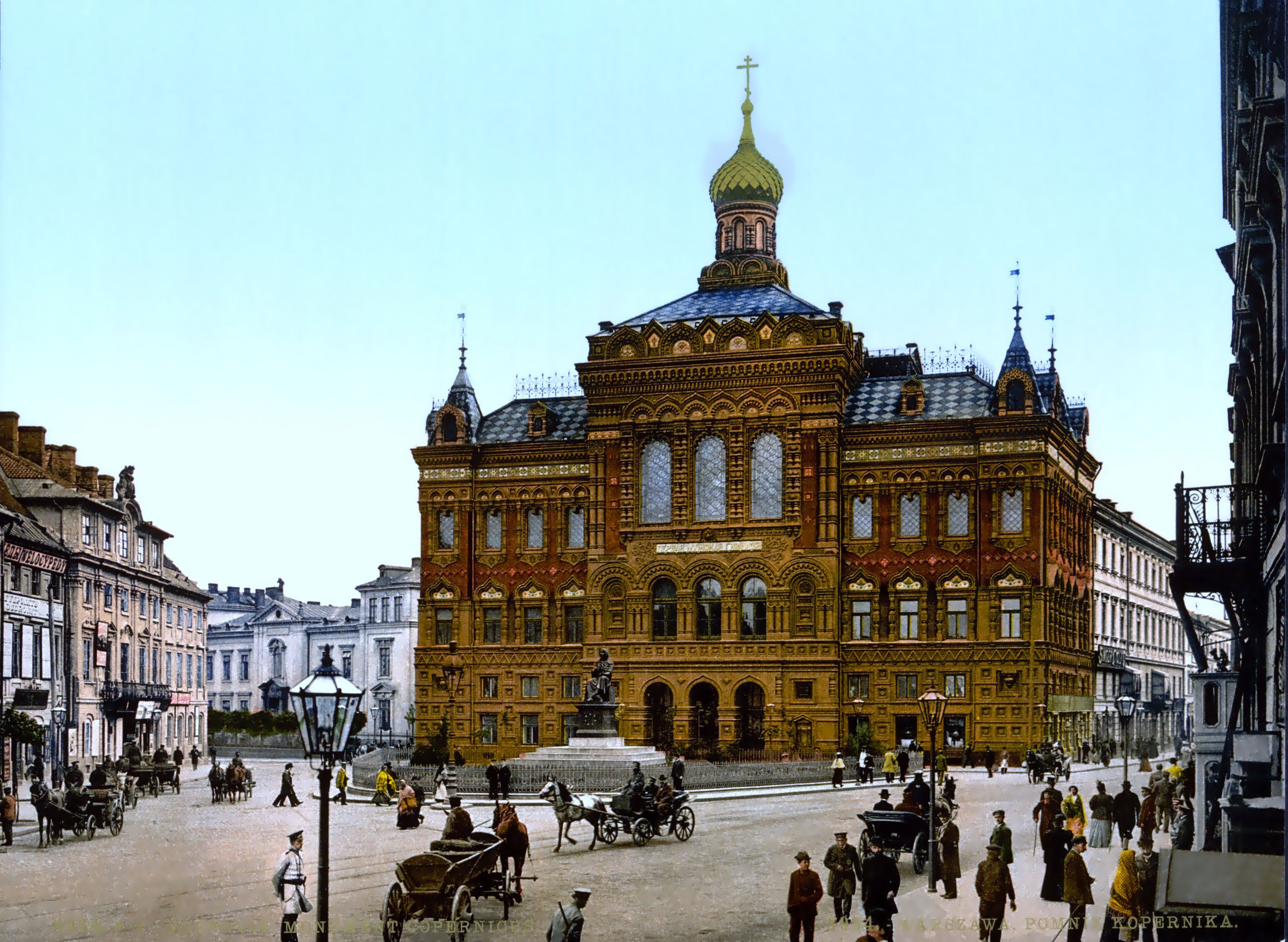
Staszic Palace after reconstruction by Pokrovskyi

=== Buildings in Kharkiv ===
==== Public buildings ====
- 1889 – Store of the Żyrardów Manufactory (now part of the Pokrovskyi Monastery), 10 Universytetska Street, heritage site No. 7454-KhA. Reconstruction in collaboration with Volodymyr Niemkin.
- 1912 – Hotel, 7 Rizdvyana Street, heritage site No. 7361-KhA.
- 1912 – Diocesan Museum of Antiquities (now the Radio Astronomy Institute of the National Academy of Sciences of Ukraine), 4 Mystetstv Street, heritage site No. 7227-KhA.
- 1913 – Diocesan Girls' School, 79 Hryhorii Skovoroda Street.
- 1914 – Private Girls' Gymnasium, also known as the "House with Chimeras" (currently the educational building of the Kharkiv Academy of Arts), 79 Chernyshevska Street, heritage site No. 7491-KhA.

==== Residential buildings ====
- 1911–1913 – Residential buildings, 8/1 and 8/2 Gareth Jones Street, heritage site No. 7388-KhA. Co-author: L. T. Lenevych.
- 1913 – Residential building, 7 Kontorska Street, heritage site No. 7131-KhA.
- 1913 – Pokrovskyi’s own residence, 66 Chernyshevska Street, heritage site No. 7490-KhA.
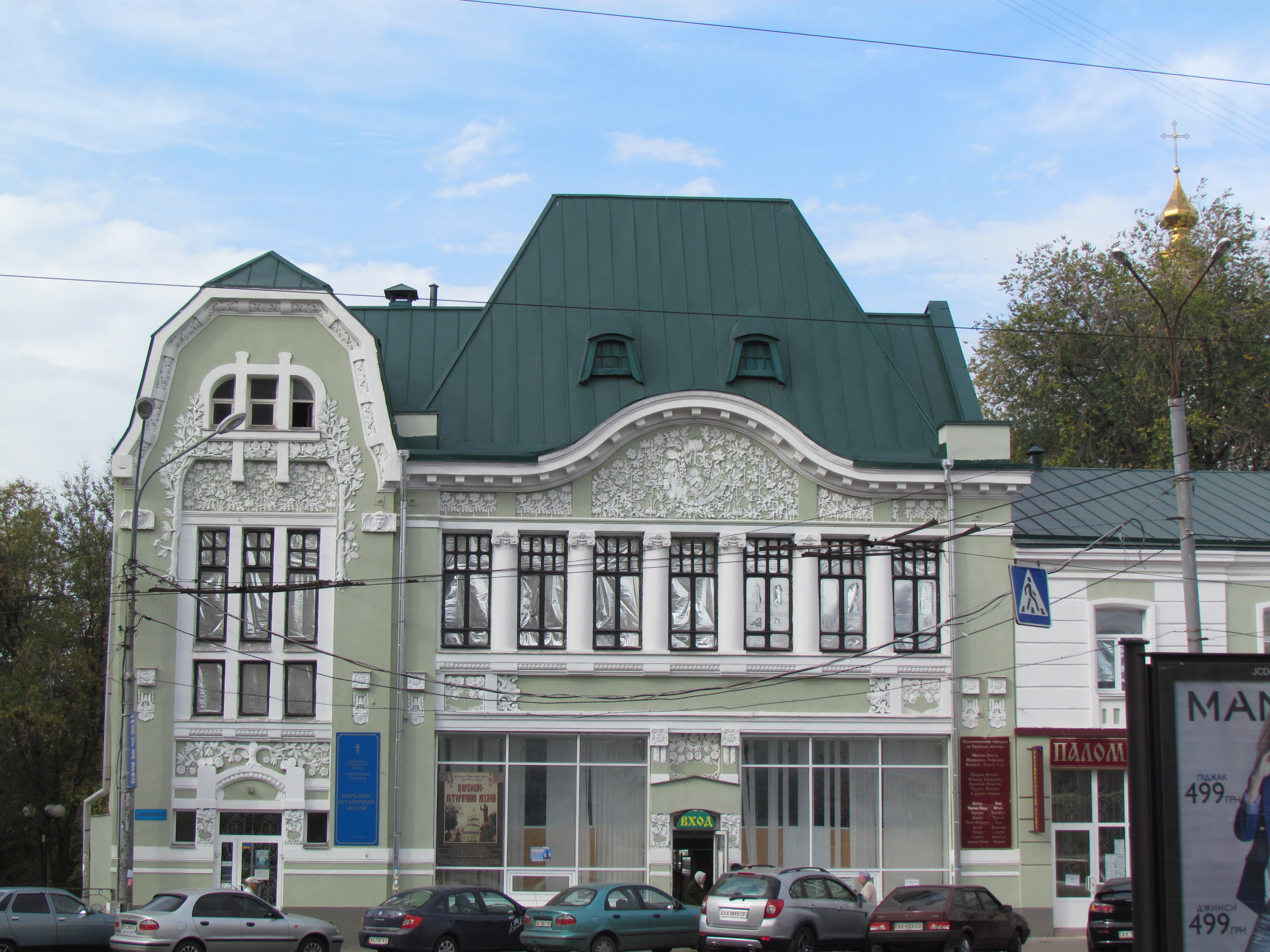
Żyrardów Manufactory store (1889), 10 Universytetska Street

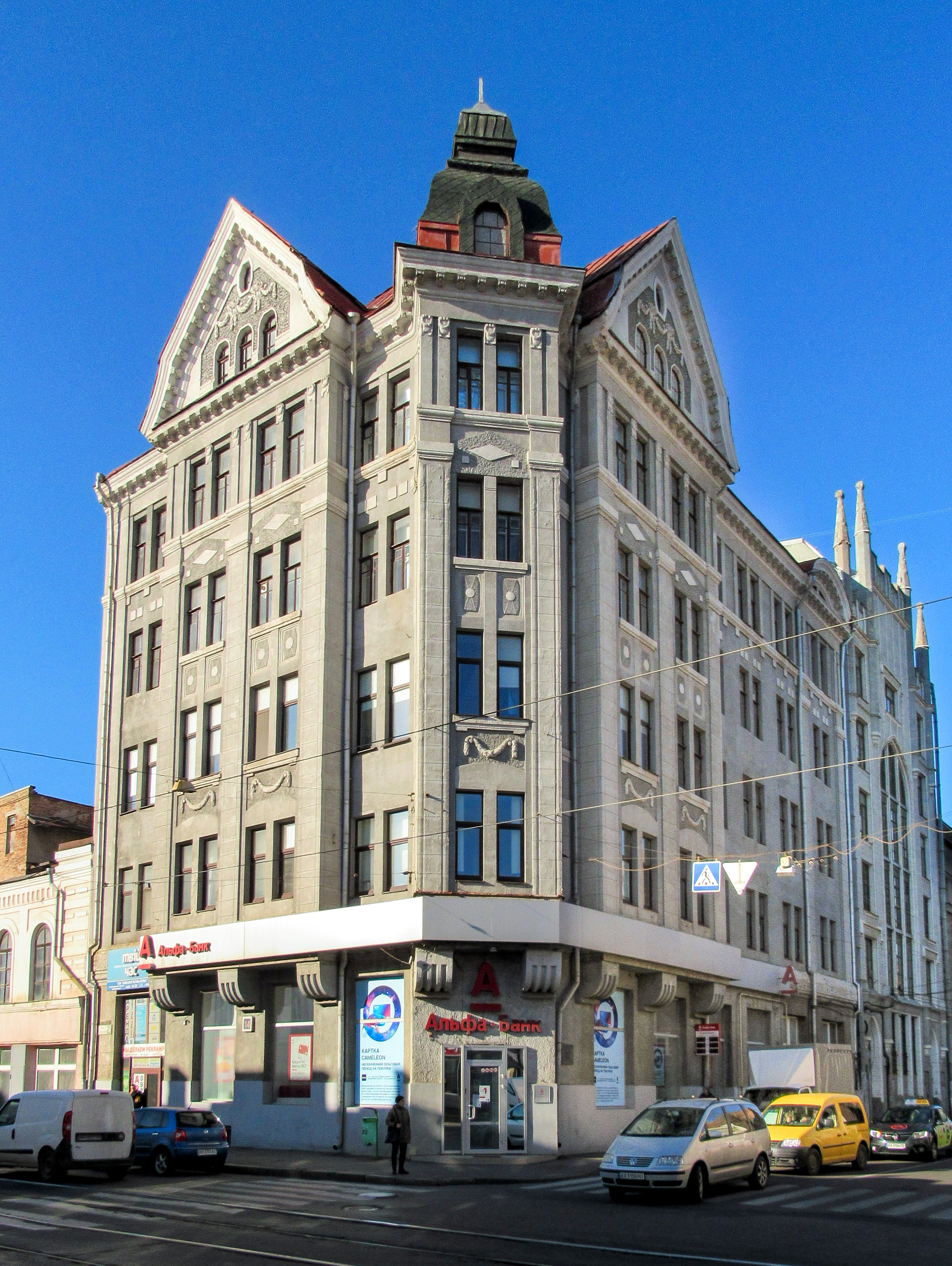
Hotel (1912), 7 Rizdvyana Street

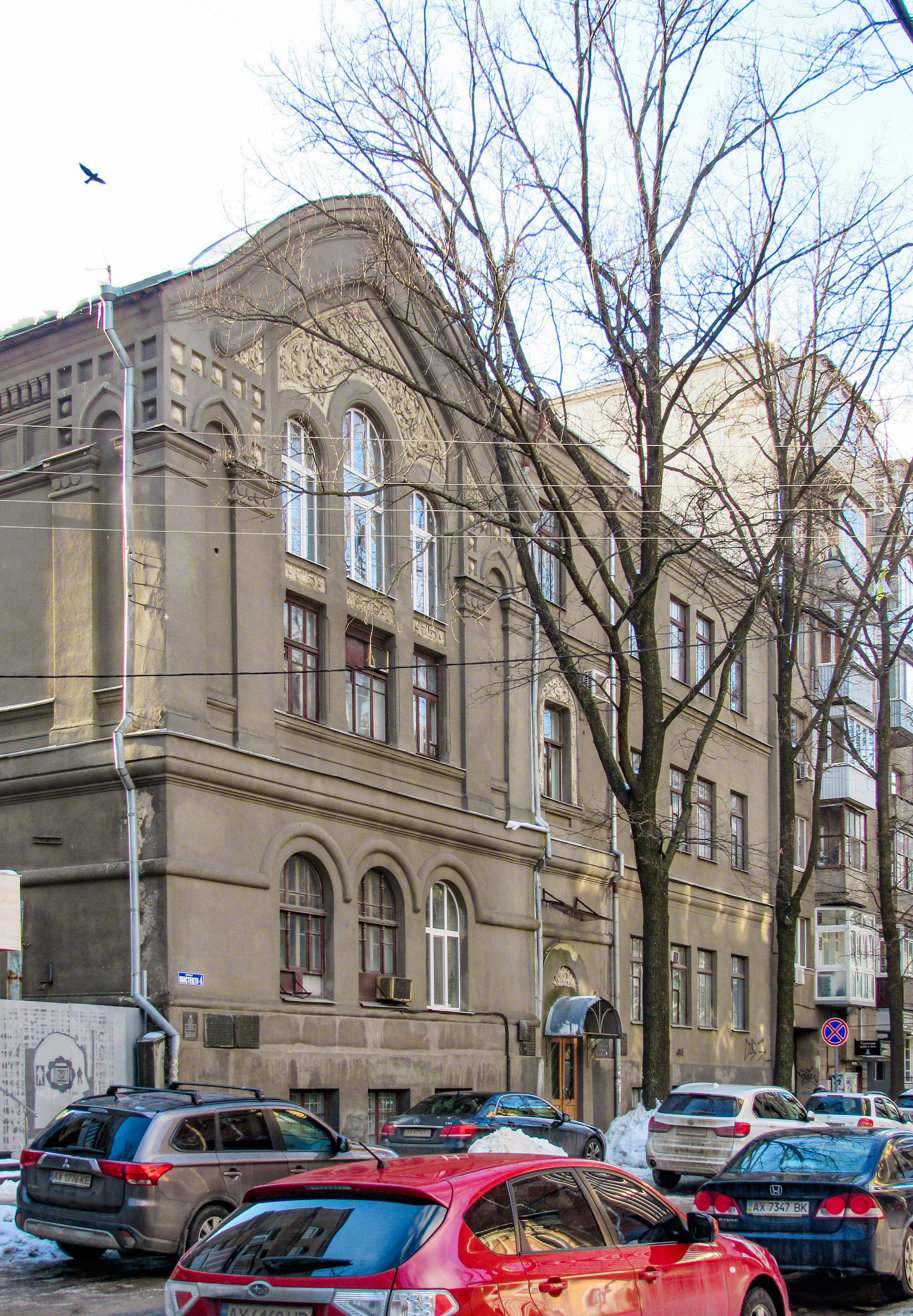
Diocesan Museum of Antiquities (1912), 4 Mystetstv Street

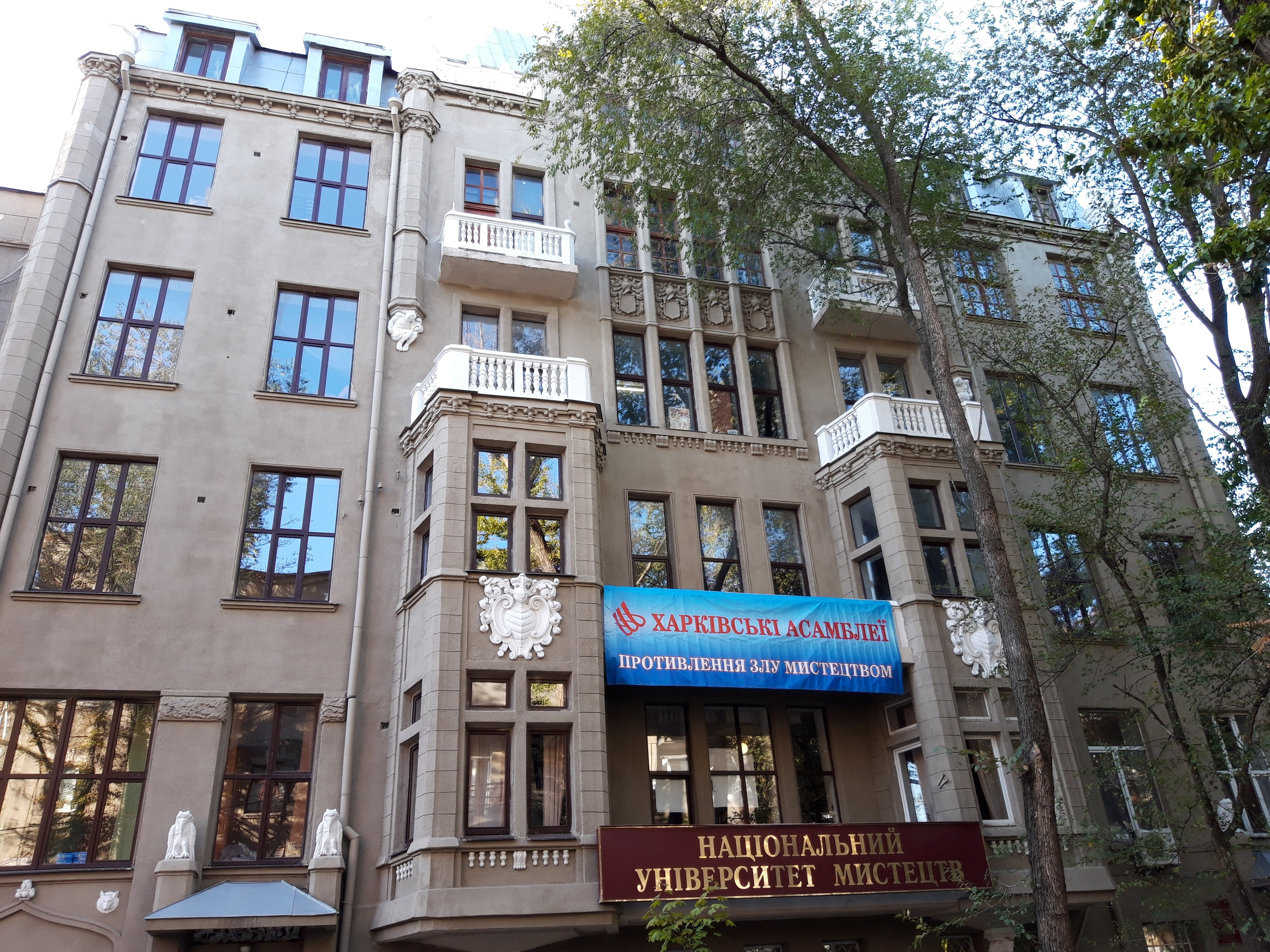
House with Chimeras (1914), 79 Chernyshevska Street

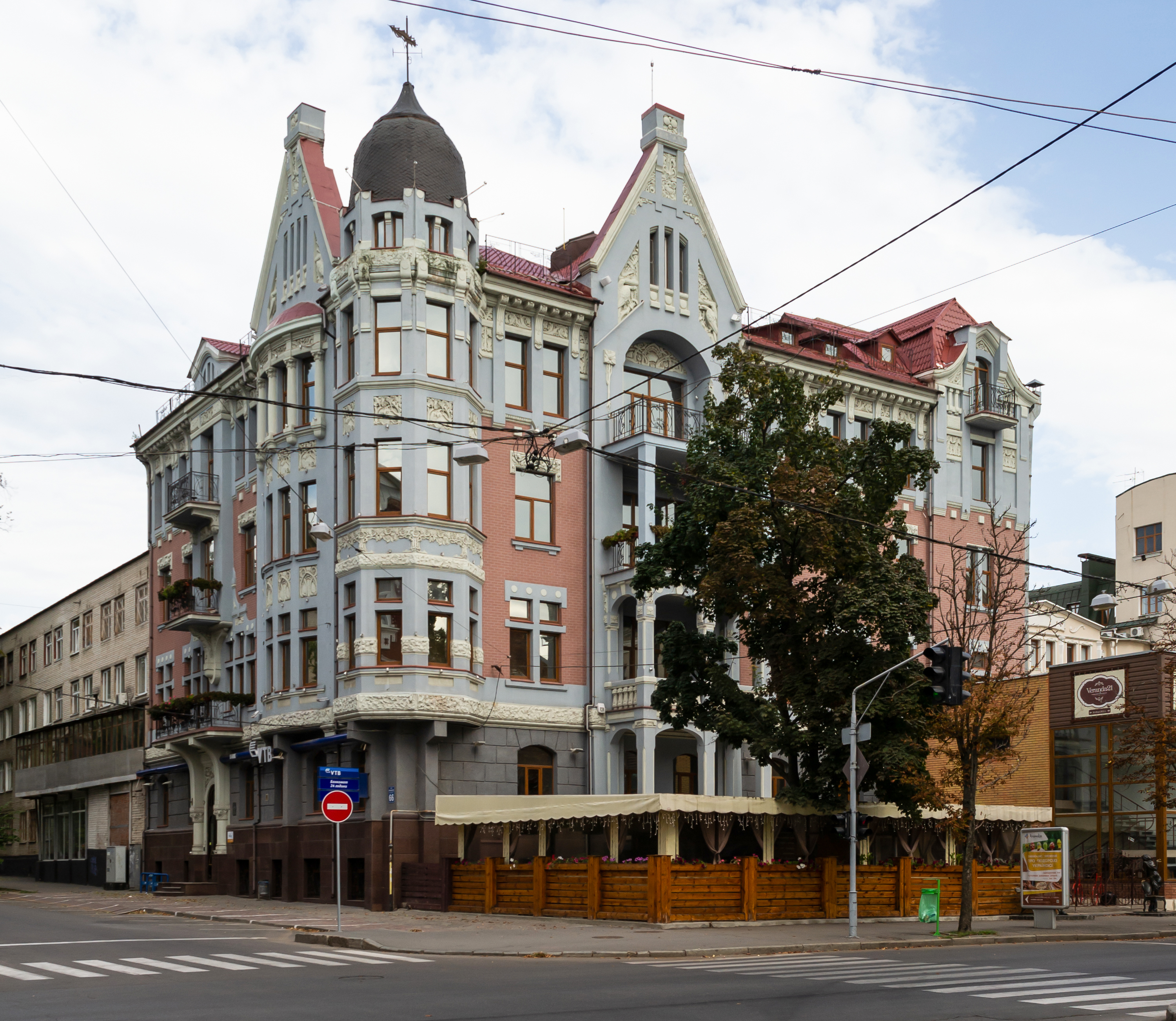
Residential building (1913), 66 Chernyshevska Street

==== Churches ====
- 1912 – Church of the Kazan Icon of the Mother of God, 78 Kurylivska Street, heritage site No. 7181-KhA. Design by Volodymyr Niemkin.
- 1914 – Church of the Three Holy Hierarchs, 101 Holbergivska Street, heritage site No. 7052-KhA. Design by Mykhailo Lovtsov.
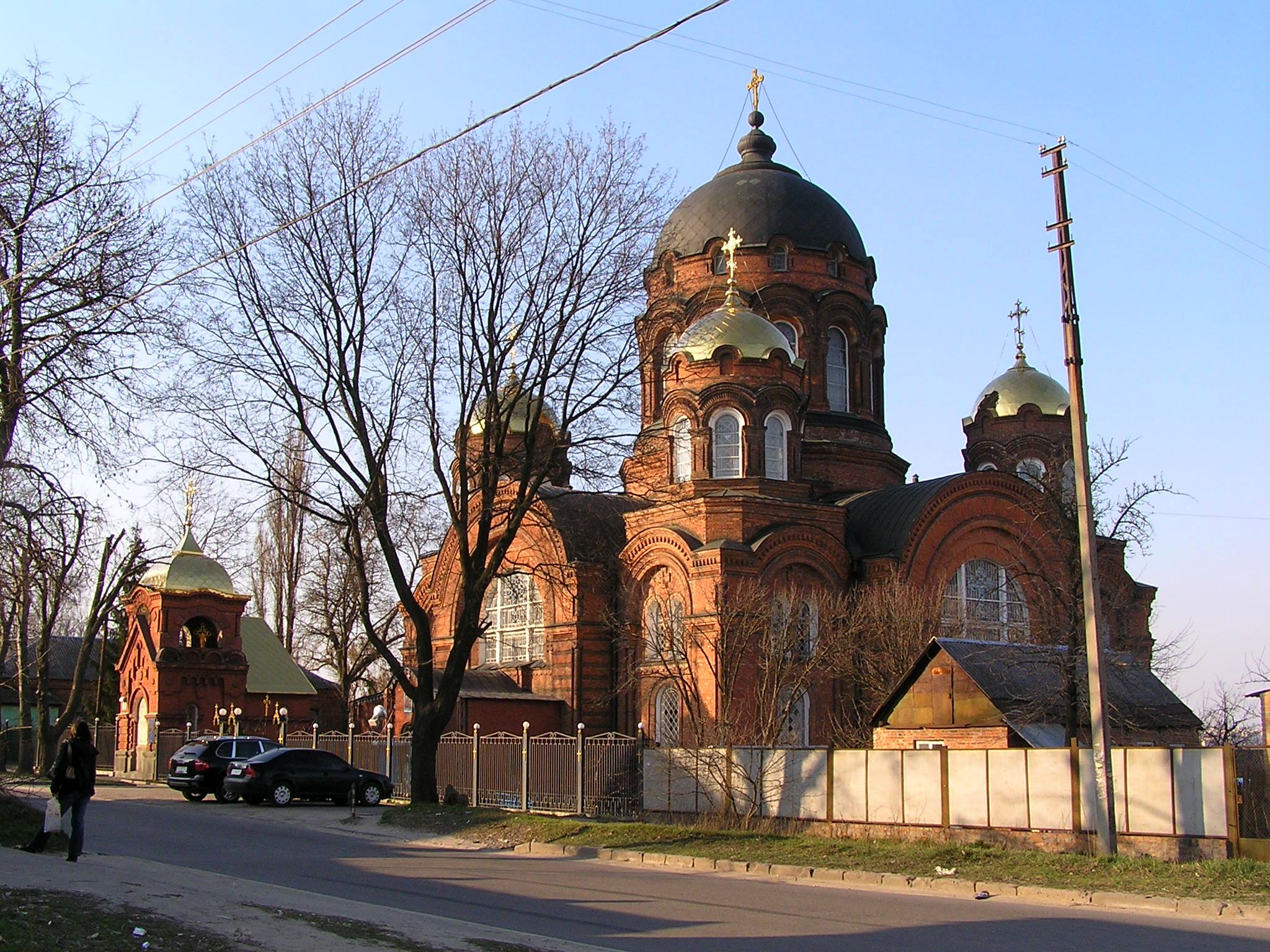
Church of the Kazan Icon of the Mother of God (1912)

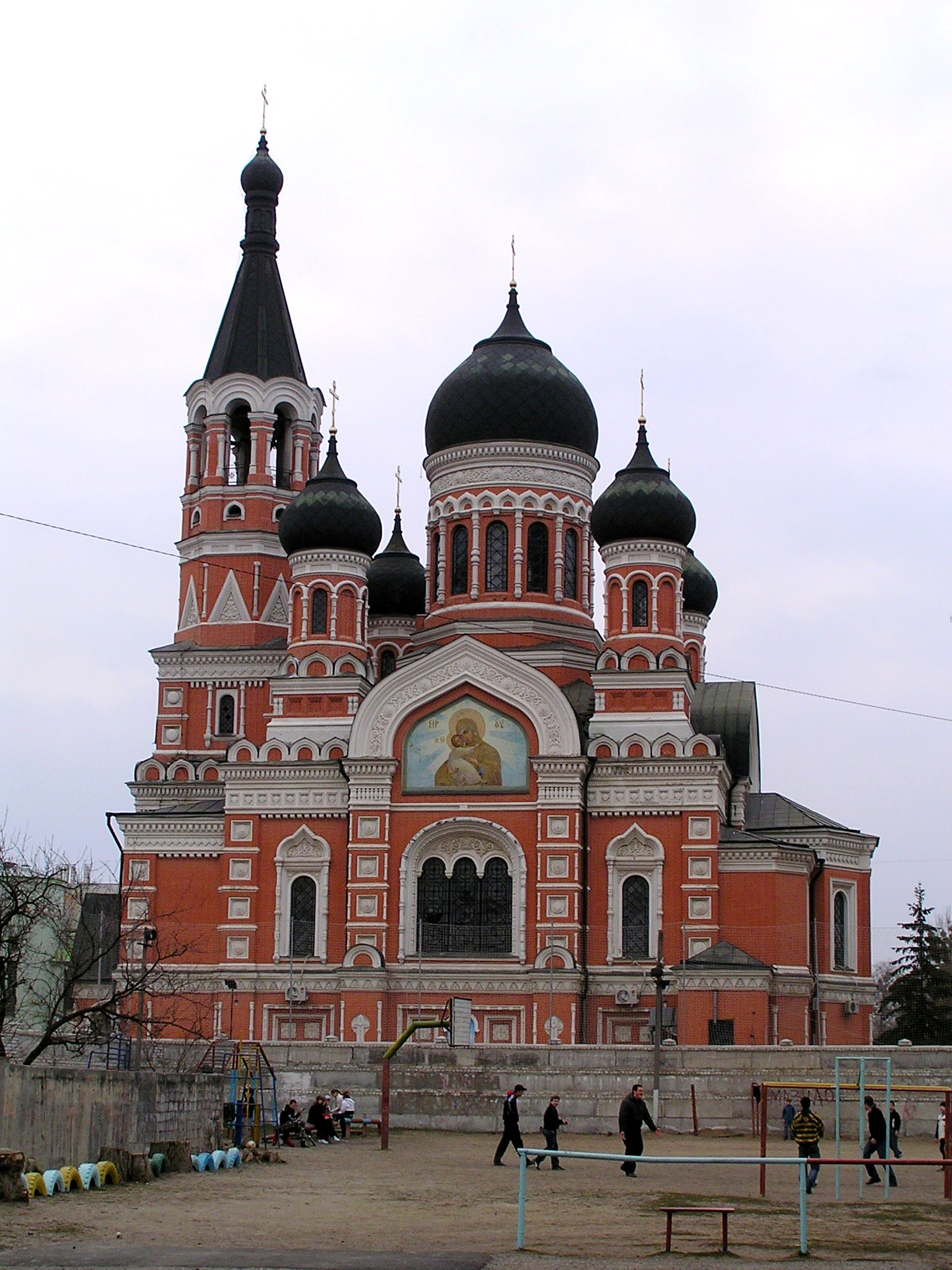
Church of the Three Holy Hierarchs (1914), 101 Holbergivska Street

== Sources ==
- А. Ю. Лейбфрейд. Владимир Николаевич Покровский // Круг. — Kharkiv, 1995. — № 3.
- Л. Е. Розвадовский. Архитектор Владимир Николаевич Покровский (1864—1924) // журнал «Ватерпас» (Kharkiv). — 1995. — № 1 (сс. 42—45), № 2 (сс. 37—39).
- Жемчужина архитектуры Харькова // Новый день
