= St. Olga's Church, Warsaw =

Former Orthodox church in Warsaw, Poland

St. Olga's Church
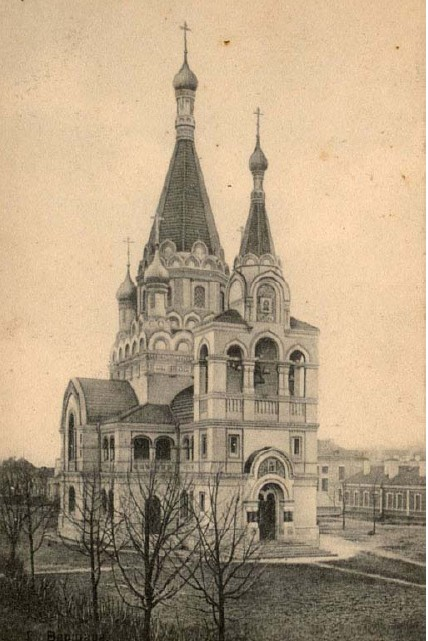
- General view of the church
- St. Olga's Church
- Location: Warsaw
- Country: Poland
- Denomination: Eastern Orthodoxy
- Churchmanship: Russian Orthodox Church

History
- Dedication: Olga of Kiev
- Dedicated: 1903

Architecture
- Architect: Volodymyr Pokrovskyi
- Years built: 1902–1903
- Closed: 1915
- Demolished: after 1919

Specifications
- Capacity: 700 people
- Length: 32 m (105 ft)
- Width: 24 m (79 ft)
- Height: 53 m (174 ft)
- Materials: brick

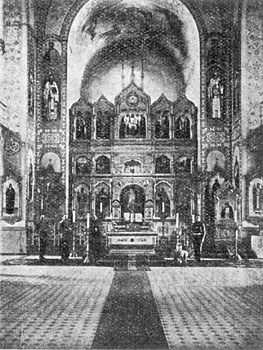
Interior of the church

St. Olga's Church was an Orthodox church in Warsaw, built between 1902 and 1903 for the Grodno Hussar Regiment of the Imperial Guard. It was demolished before 1935.

== History ==
=== Temporary church of St. Olga ===
In 1867, the first church dedicated to St. Olga was established within a barracks complex located in the area of modern-day Czerniakowska, Agricola, and Szwoleżerów streets. This military church served the hussar and uhlan regiments. Piotr Paszkiewicz, Henryk Sienkiewicz, and Renata Popkowicz-Tajchert identify this church with the building of today's Holy Spirit Cathedral in Warsaw, housed in a former Russian church. However, analyses of Russian documents and Polish studies conducted by a commission dealing with post-Russian architecture in 1919 led Kirył Sokoł and Ryszard Mączewski to reject this identification. Mączewski states that the first St. Olga Church was a house of worship located in one of the wooden barracks buildings. He identifies Teodor Witkowski as its designer. The choice of Olga of Kiev as the church's patron was deliberate, as her feast day in the Russian Orthodox Church coincided with the hussar regiment's holiday.

=== Representative church ===
In 1901, the idea of building a separate church for the hussar unit arose. Tsar Nicholas II supported this concept and personally donated 30,000 rubles, which, according to Piotr Paszkiewicz, covered half of the anticipated construction costs. Kirył Sokoł, however, asserts that the total cost of building the church was significantly higher, ultimately amounting to 100,000 rubles. Initially, the ceremonial laying of the cornerstone was planned for 21 October 1901, on the birthday of Prince Pavel Alexandrovich Romanov, the titular commander of the regiment. For unknown reasons, this plan was abandoned, and the ceremony took place on 24 May of the following year. The church was already described in the newly published Latest Guide to Warsaw in 1903, indicating its completion by that year. The church could accommodate 700 people and was very modern compared to other Orthodox churches in Warsaw, featuring electric lighting and steam heating.

The construction of St. Olga's Church was part of a broader campaign to erect Orthodox churches for Russian regiments stationed in Warsaw. According to Piotr Paszkiewicz, several such structures were built in the city at the turn of the 19th and 20th centuries. He emphasizes the political dimension of church architecture, which, in addition to fulfilling religious functions, was intended to reinforce the presence of Russian authority in Polish territories. However, he notes that due to the scarcity of sources, contemporary researchers cannot determine whether all military churches were standalone buildings or chapels within designated barracks rooms.

On 12 June 1911, a bronze bust of Russian General Mikhail Skobelev, who began his military career in the regiment caring for the church, was erected in the square adjacent to the building.

=== Location ===
The modern address of the former St. Olga's Church is 29 Listopada Street – coordinates 52°12′40.0″N 21°02′36.3″E.

=== After 1915 ===
In 1915, the church was abandoned when the unit responsible for it left Warsaw. On a 1924 map reflecting the situation seven years earlier, its outline was marked with a Latin cross, possibly indicating its spontaneous adaptation as a Catholic church. In a report by the commission dealing with the future of post-Russian churches, no clear guidelines were provided regarding its fate. However, an orthophoto of Warsaw from 1935 shows the site of the church and Skobelev's monument as empty, indicating its demolition during the reclamation of Orthodox churches as symbols of Tsarist rule.

== Architecture and interior design ==
The church was designed by diocesan architect Volodymyr Pokrovskyi in the style of 17th-century Russian churches. The building was 53 m high, 32 m long, and 24 m wide. The main dome was located above the chancel, surrounded by four smaller domes; all were gilded and topped with crosses. The structure was covered with gray granite up to two meters above ground level, while the rest of the walls were lined with white bricks. A towering bell tower rose above the church porch.

The church floor was tiled with terracotta. Inside, there was a three-tiered iconostasis made of gilded wood. Preserved photographs indicate that images of saints were also placed in side decorative icon cases, and the building's walls were covered with polychrome.

== Bibliography ==
- Paszkiewicz, Piotr (1991). Pod berłem Romanowów. Sztuka rosyjska w Warszawie 1815–1915 (in Polish). Warsaw: Komitet Architektury i Urbanistyki PAN.
- Sienkiewicz, Henryk (2006). Cerkwie w krainie kościołów (in Polish). Warsaw: TRIO. ISBN 978-83-60623-04-6.
- Sokoł, Kirył (2002). Russkaja Warszawa (in Russian). Moscow: MID Synergia. ISBN 5-7368-0252-X.
