= Warsaw Society of Friends of Learning =

Polish scientific society, 1800 to 1832

Society of Friends of Science
- Warsaw Royal Society of Friends of Sciences
- Towarzystwo Przyjaciół Nauk
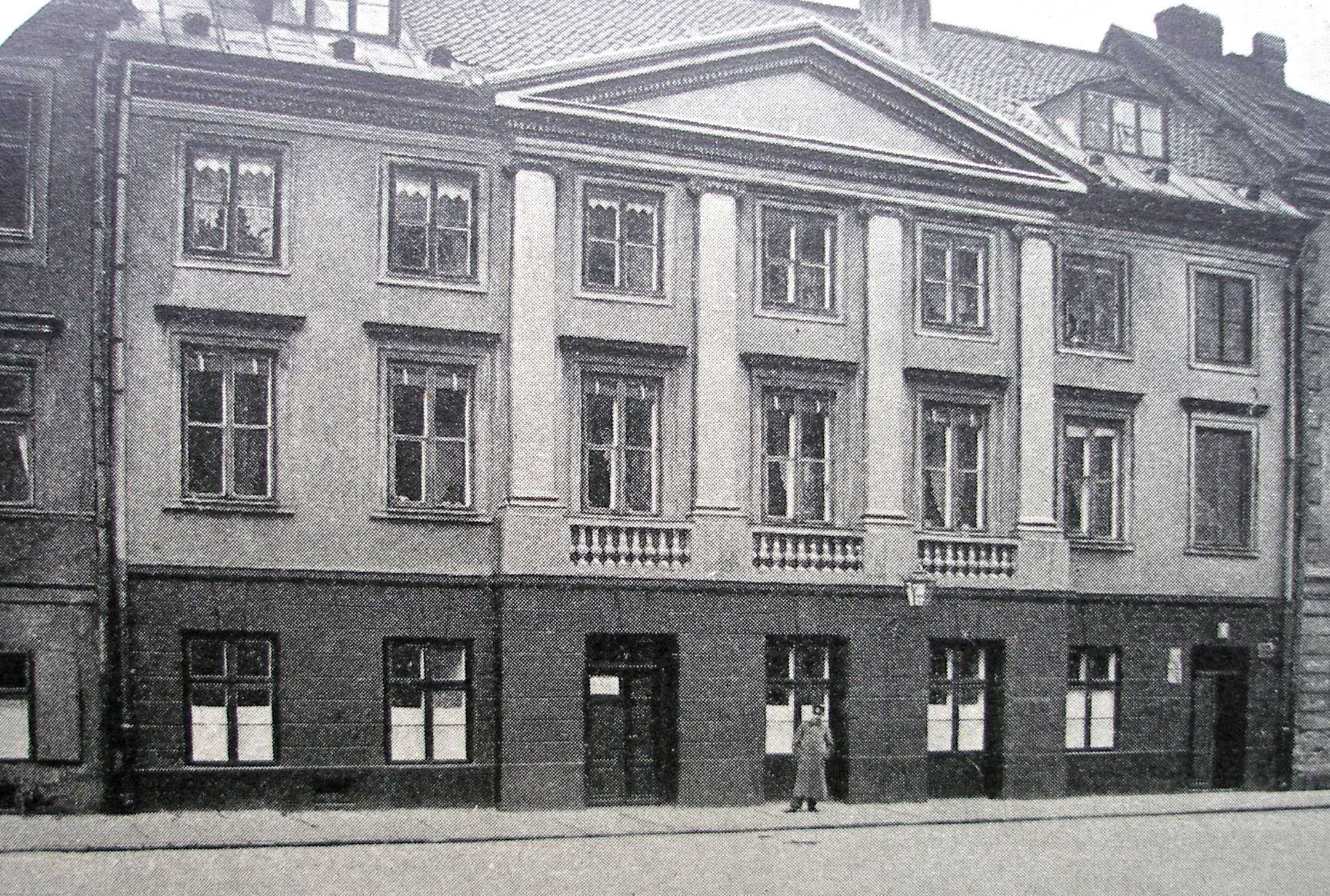
- The TPN's former building in Old Town
- Abbreviation: TPN
- Successor: Warsaw Scientific Society
- Formation: November 1800; 226 years ago
- Founder: Stanisław Sołtyk
- Founded at: South Prussia
- Dissolved: April 1832; 194 years ago
- Type: Learned society
- Purpose: Science and culture
- Headquarters: 8 Kanonia Street, Old Town, Warsaw
- Origins: Thursday Dinners
- Official language: Polish
- First President: Jan Chrzciciel Albertrandy
- Last President: Ignacy Zaborowski
- Main organ: Warsaw Chronicle
- Publication: Annals of the Warsaw Society of Friends of Learning

The Society of Friends of Science (Polish: Towarzystwo Przyjaciół Nauk, TPN) was one of the earliest Polish scientific societies, active in Warsaw from 1800 to 1832.

== Name ==
The TPN was also known as the Warszawskie Królewskie Towarzystwo Przyjaciół Nauk (transl. Warsaw Royal Society of Friends of Sciences). Sometimes the word "Royal" was omitted as it denoted the monarch of the occupying authority.

== History ==
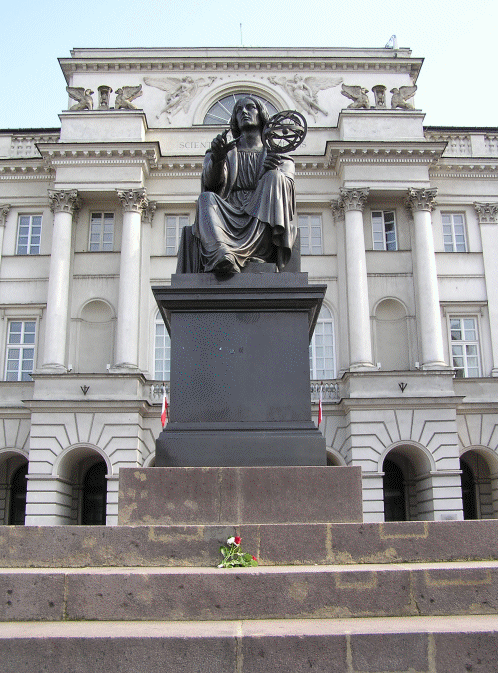
Thorvaldsen's statue of Copernicus, erected in 1830 in front of the Staszic Palace (now headquarters of the Polish Academy of Sciences)

Though the TPN was founded in 1800, its traditions harked back to the Thursday dinners that had been held in the final decades of the 18th century by Poland's last king, Stanisław August Poniatowski. From 1824 the Society was headquartered in the Staszic Palace (after its renovation in 1820–23), purchased for the Society by one of its most prominent members, Stanisław Staszic. In 1828 the TPN had 185 members.

The TPN flourished in the Duchy of Warsaw and Congress Poland, but was eventually dissolved by the Russian authorities in the aftermath of the failed November Uprising of 1830–31, when many Polish cultural organizations were delegalized as part of the repressions. The TPN's traditions were continued by the Warsaw Scientific Society (Towarzystwo Naukowe Warszawskie).

== Influence ==
The TPN was an important part of the second half of the Enlightenment in Poland, preserving Polish culture and science after the partitions of Poland damaged the fledgling Polish education system (after the world's first ministry of education, the Commission of National Education, was abolished, many schools were closed and Germanization and Russification begun). The TPN gathered Polish scientists, academics, writers and their sponsors throughout partitioned Poland; many of whom met twice per month in Warsaw for discussions. The creation and activities of the Society had a very significant impact on the development of science in Poland. It supported various scientific pursuits, from research, through creation of museums and libraries, organizing various events to supporting education and publishing. The TPN sought to popularize learning and shape intellectual and artistic trends, it also had a very broad membership.

After the Załuski Library had been removed by the Russians to St. Petersburg, the TPN's library was the greatest public library in former Poland. Its collection was partially confiscated by the Russians in 1832, and later parts of it were destroyed by the Nazis during the Second World War. It had its own journal, the Annals of the Warsaw Society of Friends of Learning (Roczniki Warszawskiego Towarzystwa Przyjaciół Nauk, vols. 1-21, published 1802–30), and the Warsaw Chronicle (Pamiętnik Warszawski), a serious monthly modeled on publications such as the Edinburgh Review.

While some of TPN's members studied the history of Poland (Joachim Lelewel) or the Polish language (Samuel Linde), others implemented new inventions and spread ideas of the Industrial Revolution. Staszic was responsible for substantial improvements in mining, Tadeusz Czacki worked at regulating rivers, and others applied engineering or medicine.

After the Warsaw TPN was disbanded in 1832, organizations in other cities began using analogous names, e.g., the Poznań Society of Friends of Learning.

== Notables ==
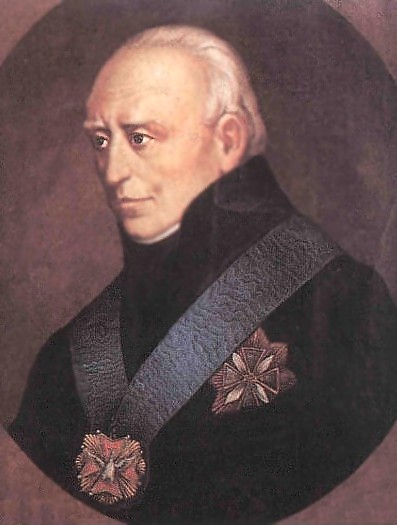
Stanisław Staszic, long-time president of the Society

Presidents:

- Jan Chrzciciel Albertrandy (1800–1808)
- Stanislaw Staszic (1808–1826)
- Julian Ursyn Niemcewicz (1826–1832)

Members:

- Jerzy Samuel Bandtkie
- Feliks Bentkowski
- Tadeusz Czacki
- Jan Niepomucen Janowski
- Hugo Kołłątaj
- Onufry Kopczyński
- Jan Kossakowski
- Michał Dymitr Krajewski
- Onufry Kopczyński
- Samuel Linde
- Joachim Lelewel
- Krzysztof Celestyn Mrongovius
- Józef Maksymilian Ossoliński
- Stanisław Kostka Potocki
- Johann Christian Schuch
- Fryderyk Skarbek
- Jan Śniadecki
- Jędrzej Śniadecki
- Abraham Stern
- Ignacy Zaborowski

== See also ==
- Poznań Society of Friends of Learning
- Academy of Sciences
- Polish Academy of Sciences (headquartered in Warsaw)
- Polish Academy of Learning (headquartered in Kraków)
