= Ignacy Zaborowski =

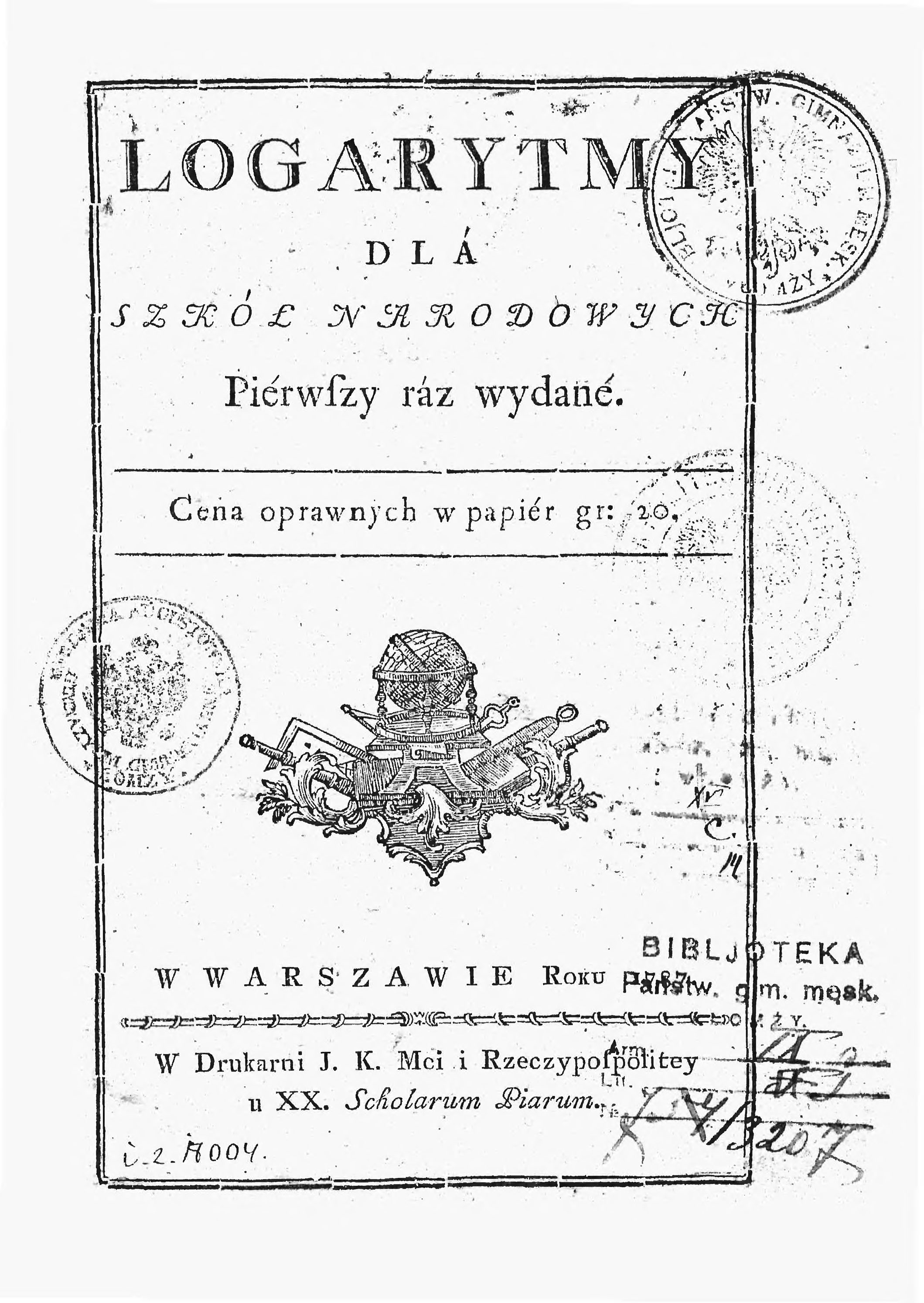
Book cover of Logarytmy dlá szkół narodowych, 1787.

Ignacy Zaborowski (2 November 1754–10 January 1803) was a Polish mathematician and geodesist; Piarist. He was a professor and rector of the Collegium Nobilium.

== Biography ==
Born on 2 November 1754 in Ruthenian Voivodeship, Zaborowski attended Piarists school in Zolochiv. He joined the Piarists order and after that he taught mathematics in Piarists school in Waręż and Łomża. After moving to Warsaw, he became a teacher of mathematics and measuring, and then rector (1799–1801) of Collegium Nobilium. In 1777 he went to Vienna for supplementary studies.

In 1786 Zaborowski published the textbook Jeometria praktyczna (Polish for Practical geometry), where he described methods of geodesic measurement. The book was awarded the Merentibus by Stanisław August Poniatowski. Zaborowski was an author of Logarytmy dlá szkół narodowych (Polish for Logarithms for national schools) written by order of Commission of National Education and published in 1787. He also wrote Tablice matematyczne (Polish for Mathematical tables) which was published in 1797. He translated Fulgenty Obermajer's Arytmetyka praktyczna kieszonkowa. He started working on the book Geometria wiejska, an agriculture measurement textbook, but it has not been finished.

In 1800 he became a member of the Society of Friends of Science. Since 1802 he was a provincial of Piarists.

Zaborowski died on 10 January 1803 in Warsaw.

== Works ==
Books:

- Jeometria praktyczna (1786)
- Logarytmy dlá szkół narodowych (1787)
- Tablice matematyczne (1797)
- Geometria wiejska (never finished)

Translations:

- Obermajer, Fulgenty. Arytmetyka praktyczna kieszonkowa, Porywcze codzienne trafiające się rachunki, przy redukcyach monet, przy kupi i przedaży, z wielką łatwością odprawująca przez taryfę, o której na samym czele kładnie się informacya.
