= Warsaw Scientific Society =

Scientific society in Warsaw

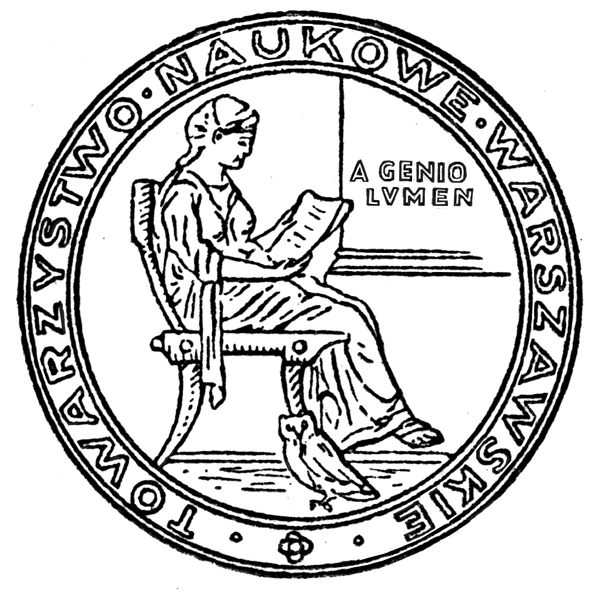
- Seal of the TNW, 1907

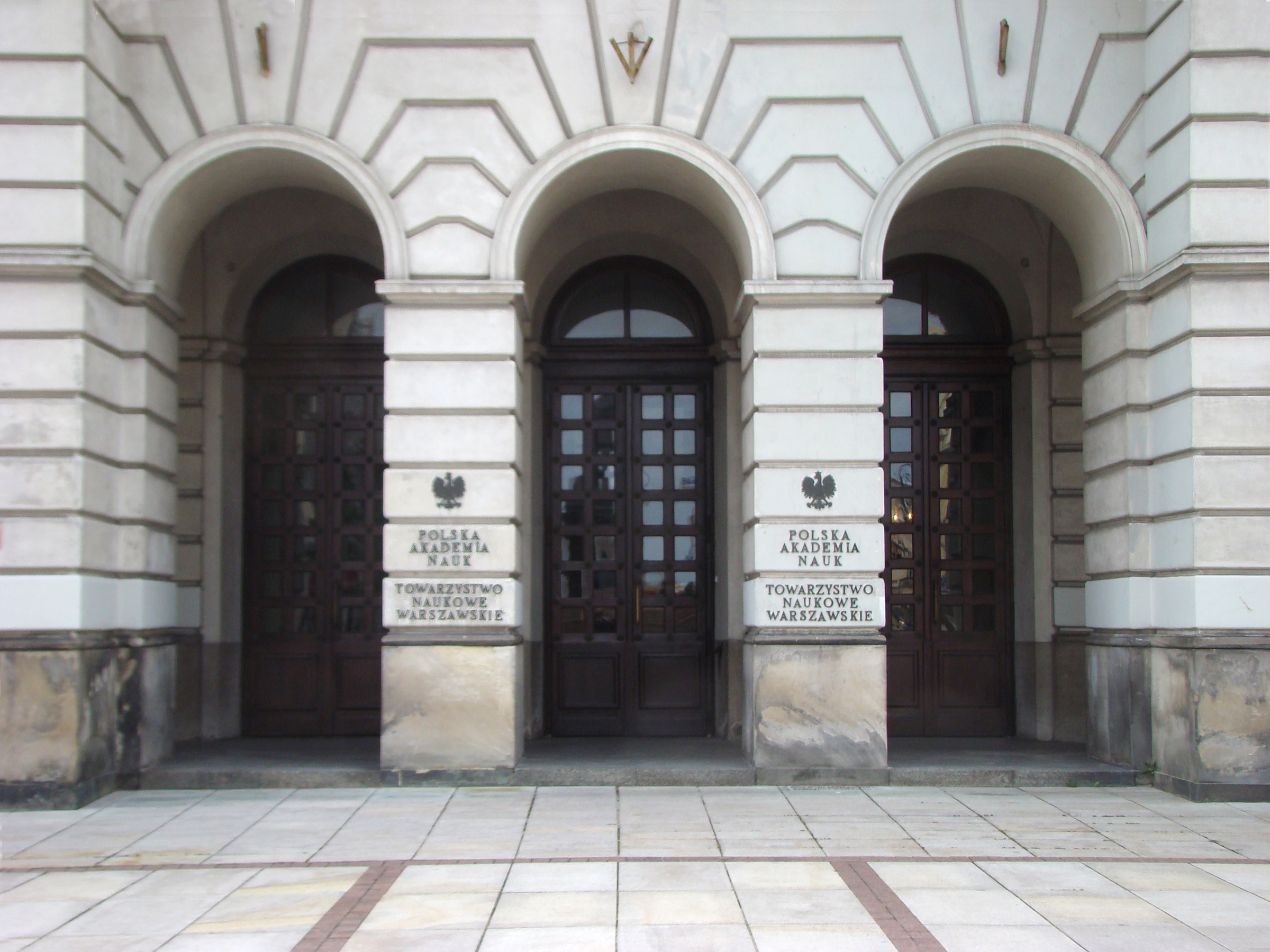
- Abbreviation: TNW
- Formation: 1907
- Type: scientific society
- Headquarters: Warsaw
- Region served: Poland
- Website: tnw.waw.pl

Warsaw Scientific Society (Polish: Towarzystwo Naukowe Warszawskie; TNW) is a Polish scientific society based in Warsaw. It was established in 1907 as a continuation of the Society of Friends of Science to advance the sciences and arts and to publish scientific papers.
