= Polish opera =

Music genre

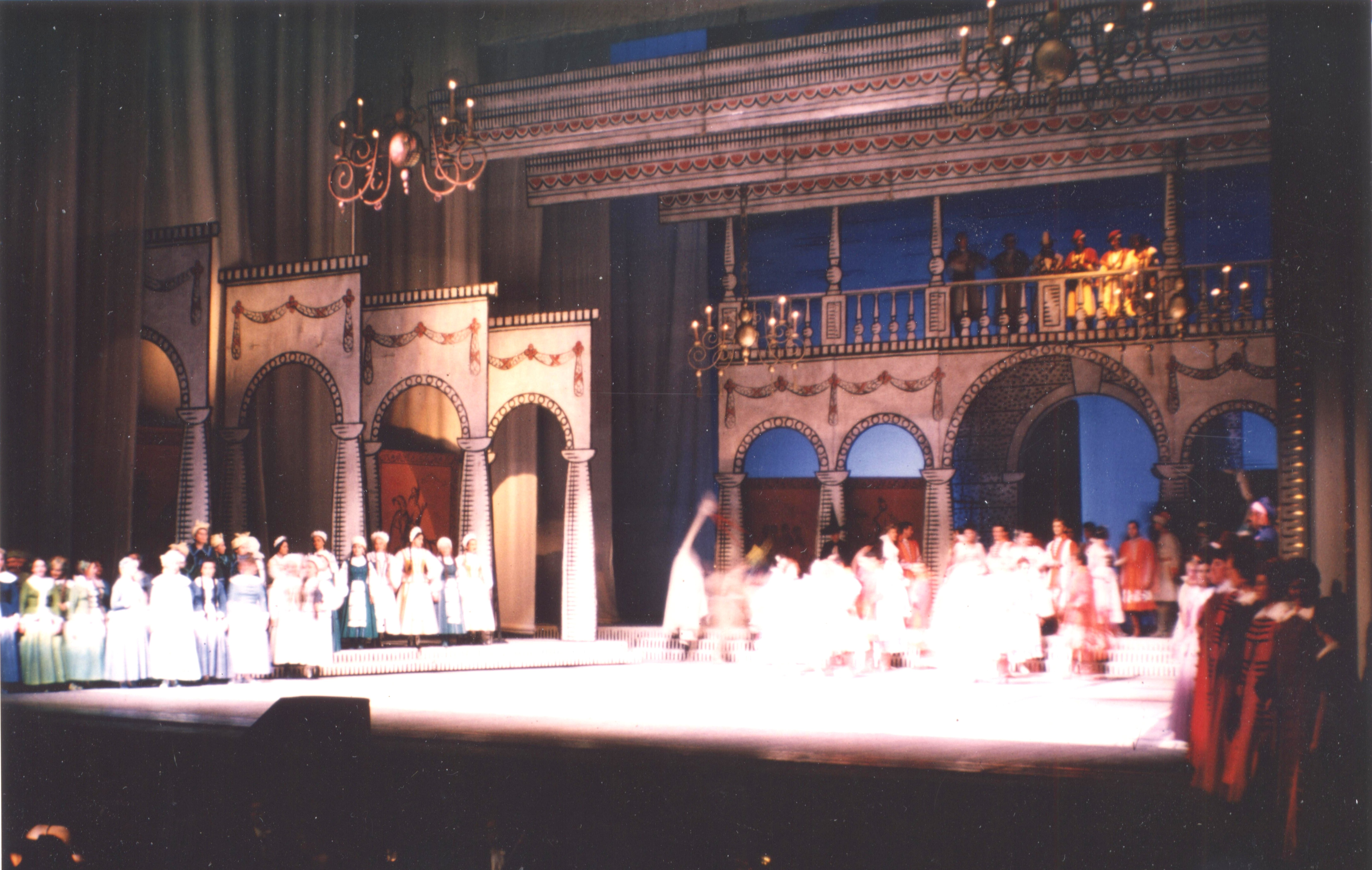
The Haunted Manor by Stanisław Moniuszko performed at the Grand Theatre in Warsaw on September 22, 1966

Polish opera may be broadly understood to include operas staged in Poland and works written for foreign stages by Polish composers, as well as opera in the Polish language.

The tradition reaches back to Italian language entertainments of the baroque. Romantic opera in Polish flourished alongside nationalism after the partition and is exemplified by the work of Stanisław Moniuszko. In the 20th century Polish opera was exported and composers such as Krzysztof Penderecki wrote operas in other languages (Ubu Rex, Die Teufel von Loudun) that were translated into Polish later.

== 17th century ==
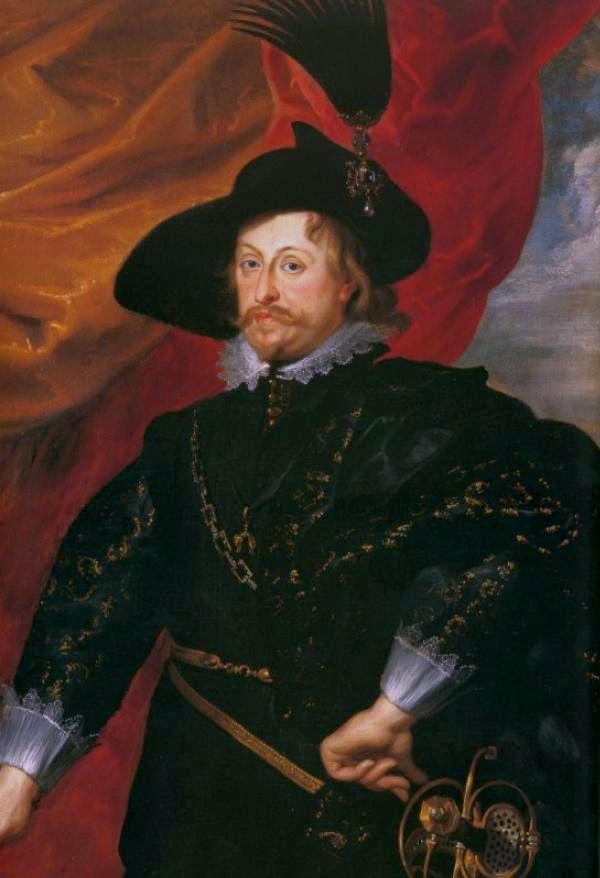
Władysław IV, Poland's first opera patron

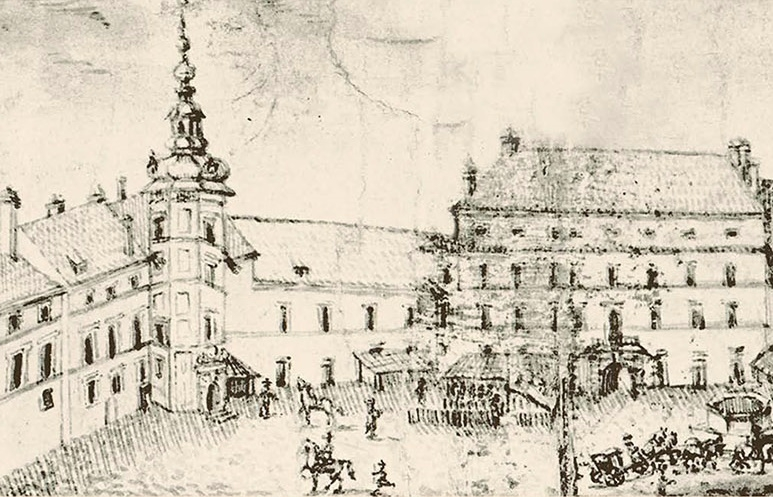
Władysław's Opera Hall (right) at the Royal Castle, Warsaw

Operas were first performed in Poland during the Baroque era in the reign of Sigismund III Vasa (1587-1632). The king himself had no interest in the arts, but his son Władysław IV (reigned 1632-1648) was an enthusiast and patron of opera while he was still a prince. In 1625 Francesca Caccini wrote an opera for Władysław when he visited Italy. This opera, La liberazione di Ruggiero dall'isola d'Alcina, was also performed in Warsaw in 1628; this is the earliest verified performance of an Italian opera outside of Italy.

Gli amori di Aci e Galatea by Santi Orlandi was also performed in 1628. When Władysław became king, he had operas staged in the hall of the royal castle and he invited Marco Scacchi's opera troupe to Poland. A dramma per musica (as serious Italian opera was known at the time) entitled Giuditta, based on the Biblical story of Judith, was performed in 1635. The composer was probably Virgilio Puccitelli. During the reign of Władysław IV a dozen or so operas were performed whose music has not survived.

== Saxon era (1697-1763) ==
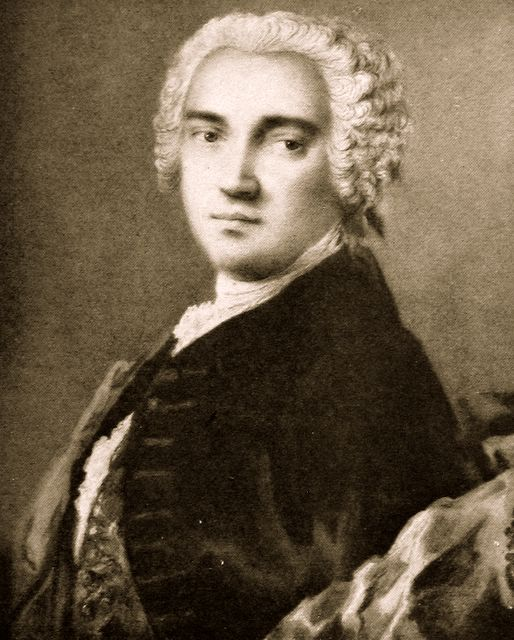
Johann Adolph Hasse

The next kings John II Casimir of Poland, Michał Korybut Wiśniowiecki and John III Sobieski were too busy fighting wars to show much concern for opera, although such works that did appear were highly esteemed. After the Elector of Saxony was voted King of Poland in 1697, the situation changed. The German ruler presided over a thriving operatic scene at his court in Dresden. The first public opera house in Poland was opened in 1724. The great moderniser of Polish opera was another Saxon, King August III. In 1748 he built an opera house in which works by Italian and German composers were regularly staged. A star of European opera, the composer Johann Adolf Hasse, also arrived in Poland. His work there increased opera's popularity amongst the nobility and raised the artistic standards of Polish opera to an international level. Hasse wrote the opera seria Zenobia, to a libretto by Pietro Metastasio, especially for Warsaw in 1761.

== Late 18th century ==
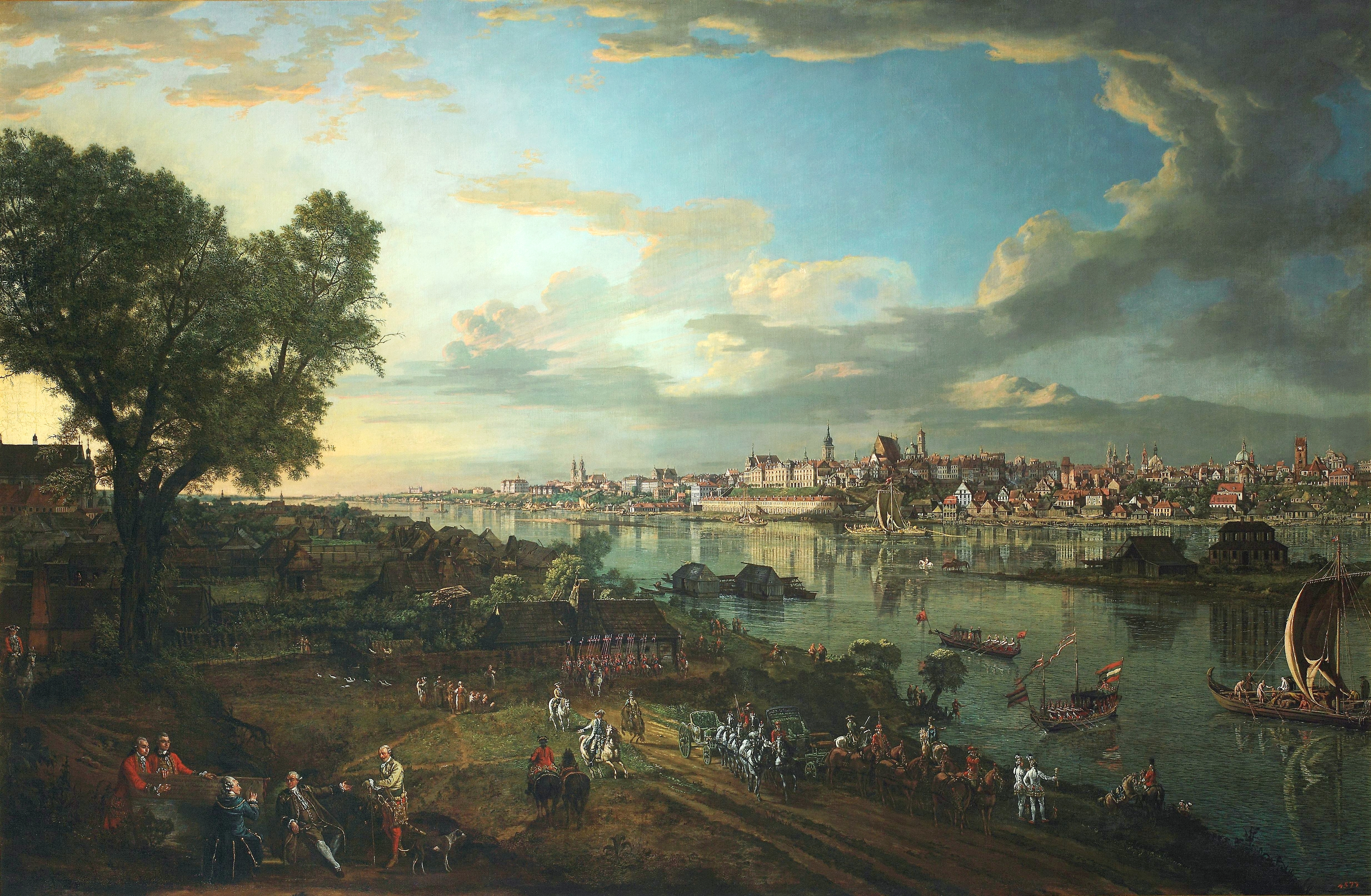
Warsaw, 1770, by Canaletto

A high point of Polish opera occurred during the reign of the last king of Poland, Stanisław August Poniatowski, in spite of the political troubles that afflicted the country. During this time Poland was carved up by its neighbours, Prussia, Austria and Russia, in a series of three Partitions between 1772 and 1795, when the country disappeared off the map of Europe. Yet culture thrived, a National Theatre was opened in 1779, and it was probably during this era that the first operas in Polish were written, although not even the titles and authors of these pieces are known. In 1777 Franciszek Bohomolec wrote the text for a cantata, Nędza uszczęśliwiona (Poverty Made Happy). Wojciech Bogusławski quickly turned this into a libretto for an opera which was staged with music by Maciej Kamieński. It is the first known opera in the Polish language. The composer was a Polonised Czech; Bogusławski and Bohomolec were Polish noblemen. Bogusławski threw himself into writing drama, which later earned him the name of "the father of Polish theatre". Bogusławski wrote and staged the opera buffa Henryk IV na łowach (Henri IV Goes Hunting) with music by Jan Stefani. It was followed by Cud mniemany, czyli Krakowiacy i Górale (The Supposed Miracle, or the Krakowians and the Highlanders). The text of the latter was lost during the January Uprising of 1863 and only rediscovered in 1929 by Leon Schiller (who called it a "Polish national opera"). The premiere took place on 1 March 1794 to unprecedented applause. It occurred a few weeks before the Kościuszko Uprising against the foreign powers and the opera itself included pro-Kościuszko slogans. The authorities had the opera removed after four performances due to its unexpected popularity and anti-Partition allusions.

== Polish National Opera ==
The fall of Poland did not stop operatic activity in the country. Wojciech Bogusławski was still at work. In the 1790s, Józef Elsner emerged in Lwów (Lviv, then Lemberg in the region conquered by Austria). Almost none of his many operas has survived, the most notable extant work being Amazonki, czyli Herminia (The Amazons, or Herminia). When Elsner took over the National Theatre in Warsaw, he began to write operas which made use of Polish folk music.

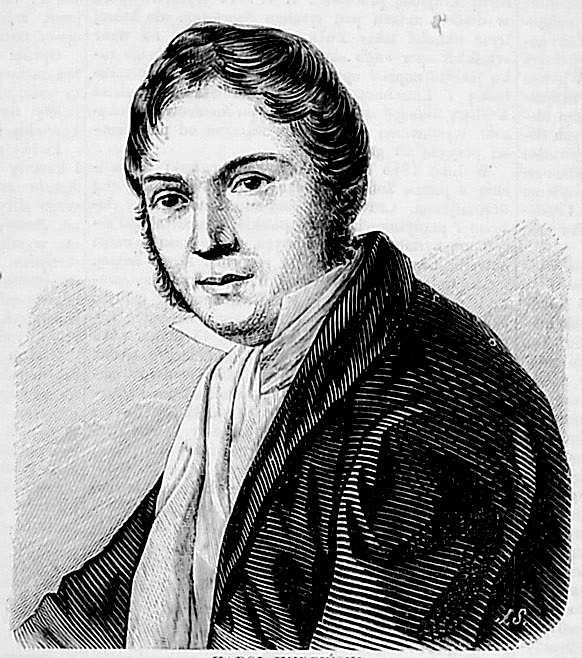
Karol Kurpiński

He began his work in Warsaw by composing an opera to a libretto by Bogusławski called Iskahar. However, he was doubtful of its success, since his knowledge of the Polish language was too limited for an adequate musical expression of the words. He was also concerned with the problem of the change of accents in the sung text, which could become unintelligible if they were muddled.

Elsner soon (1799) became the principal conductor at the National Theatre. In 1810 he was joined by composer Karol Kurpiński, who took up the post of second conductor. The two began a rivalry which lasted thirteen years until Elsner was removed by the Ruling Committee of the National Theatre at Kurpiński's request. By that time he had managed to write 30 operas. In 1809 he scored a notable triumph with Leszek Biały (Leszek the White), to a libretto by Bogusławski. After this only the comic opera Siedem razy jeden (Seven Times One) and Król Łokietek (King Elbow-High) brought him moderate success.

Elsner had been born in Silesia and his first language was German, leading his critics to deny that he was truly Polish and to accuse him of sympathizing with the foreign invaders. The composer had praised some of the partitioning rulers, including Tsar Alexander I of Russia. After the November Uprising of 1830 he adopted a diametrically opposite opinion. For years he defended the Polish language as beautiful and fit for singing. He was an ardent proponent of Polish opera (by his time there were 300 works in the language in existence), particularly in the first ever account of the national tradition - Die Oper der Polen - published in 1812.

During this time Karol Kurpiński began to enjoy great success. Kurpiński composed 18 operas. All of them were enthusiastically received, but his best known works were Zamek w Czorsztynie (The Castle in Czorsztyn) and Zabobon, czyli Krakowiacy i Górale. The first was the prototype of Moniuszko's The Haunted Manor. The second was a new opera to Bogusławski's libretto. Kurpiński also won acclaim for Nagroda, czyli wskrzeszenie Królestwa Polskiego (The Prize, or the Resurrection of the Kingdom of Poland). As an ardent patriot and opponent of the foreign occupation, Kurpiński used his music as part of the struggle for independence (just as Giuseppe Verdi did in Italy). Following on from Elsner, Kurpiński significantly modernised the National Theatre. He introduced many works to the Polish stage, including Mozart's Don Giovanni, Spontini's La vestale, Auber's Fra Diavolo, Weber's Der Freischütz and many other operas by Donizetti, Meyerbeer and Rossini.

In 1833 Antonio Corazzi, an Italian from Livorno, built a new theatre for the National Opera in Warsaw. The house was opened with a performance of Rossini's The Barber of Seville.

== Stanisław Moniuszko ==
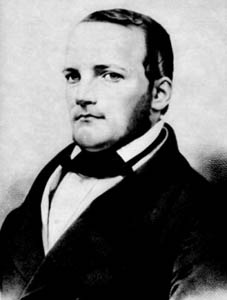
Stanisław Moniuszko

Stanisław Moniuszko is regarded as the true creator of Polish national opera. His role in the Polish tradition is similar to that of Glinka in the Russian, Smetana in the Czech and Ferenc Erkel in the Hungarian.

In 1837 Moniuszko returned to Poland after receiving his musical education abroad. Ten years later he wrote the famous Polish Romantic opera Halka. The first, two-act version had its premiere in Vilnius, and a second, four-act version was performed in Warsaw ten years later. The work is regarded as one of the finest Polish national operas. It is made up of musical forms from the Polish folk tradition - polonaises, mazurkas and dumkas - and was the first Polish opera to be "through-composed" (i.e. the entire libretto is set to music and there is no spoken dialogue).

The libretto of Halka, by Włodzimierz Wolski is recognised as one of the finest Polish literary works of its time. Critics have noted certain similarities to Goethe's Faust. Moniuszko's next most important work is Straszny Dwór (The Haunted Manor), more comic in spirit than Halka. It has a libretto by Jan Chęciński which is full of allusions to the Polish noble tradition of Sarmatism and pro-independence sentiments, which led to the opera being banned. The premiere took place in 1865 to great applause, yet the authorities withdrew it after a handful of performances.

== Polish school of opera ==
One of Moniuszko's followers was Władysław Żeleński. Though he was never actually one of Moniuszko's students, he modeled his works on Moniuszko, thus inheriting his musical style. He was the father of the writer and translator Tadeusz Boy-Żeleński, who would go on to translate many opera libretti. Żeleński's music is firmly rooted in Romanticism and his operas follow the example of Moniuszko. Żeleński wrote four operatic works: Konrad Wallenrod, Goplana, Janek, Stara Baśń. The first is based on the poem by Mickiewicz and is full of pro-independence sentiments, as are the three others. Goplana is based on Juliusz Słowacki's play Balladyna. All are Slavophil and Romantic in character. They belong to the Slavic craze among Polish Romantics which was started by Zorian Dołęga-Chodakowski.

An important 20th century Polish opera, Manru (1901) was composed by Ignacy Paderewski to a libretto by Alfred Nossig based on the novel Chata za wsią by Józef Ignacy Kraszewski. To this day that opera, which received its American premiere at the Metropolitan Opera in 1902, remains the only Polish opera by the Polish composer ever performed there. Other examples of modern opera are Bolesław Śmiały (Bolesław the Bold) and Casanova by Ludomir Różycki (the first to a libretto by Stanisław Wyspiański). The same composer wrote music to a text by Jerzy Żuławski and created one of the outstanding modernist operas - Eros i Psyche (Cupid and Psyche). Important works from the early 20th century are Legenda Bałtyku (The Legend of the Baltic) by Feliks Nowowiejski and Król Zygmunt August (King Zygmunt August) by Tadeusz Joteyko.

== Karol Szymanowski ==
Karol Szymanowski wrote only two operas, both completely breaking away from the model of Moniuszko. The first, Hagith, was influenced by Richard Strauss's Salome and was a failure at its premiere in 1922. Much more important was King Roger (1926). This work was slow to gain a reputation and was considered marginal until the 1990s. It has now been performed with great success in the United Kingdom, France and Spain. Formally, King Roger draws on the tradition of oratorio as it much as it does that of opera; the chorus is a constant presence throughout almost its entire length. It is a varied work, moving from a style influenced by the singing of the Eastern Orthodox Church to dense chromatic harmony, and is considered the most important Polish opera of the 20th century.

== Post-war opera ==
Under the Communist regime in Poland (1945-1989), socialist realism was an officially endorsed artistic policy. An example of a Polish socialist realist opera is Bunt żaków (The Schoolboys' Revolt, 1951) by Tadeusz Szeligowski which tells the story of the conflict between "proletarian" schoolboys and King Zygmunt II August in 1549. The same composer wrote other operas including ones for children. Another composer of this type was Witold Rudziński, whose works include Janko Muzykant (Janko the Musician, 1953) and Komendant Paryża (The Commandant of Paris, 1960). Rudziński was influenced by a far younger composer, Krzystof Penderecki. Rudziński's finest opera is Odprawa posłów greckich (The Dismissal of the Greek Envoys), based on the play by the leading Renaissance poet Jan Kochanowski; the opera has elements of sonorism.

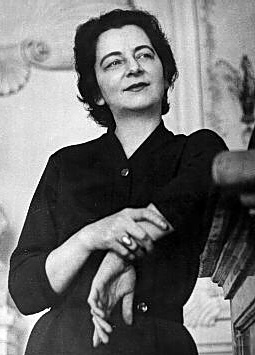
Grażyna Bacewicz

An important composer of the post-war era was Romuald Twardowski who won fame for his operas Cyrano de Bergerac (1963) and Lord Jim (1976). Other important works were written by Tadeusz Paciorkiewicz (Romans gdański, 1968), Józef Świder (Wit Stwosz, 1974, about the famous woodcarver), Henryk Czyż (Kynolog w rozterce after a play by Sławomir Mrożek, 1967; Inge Bartsch after Konstanty Ildefons Gałczyński, 1982), Tadeusz Baird (the famous Jutro, based on the short story "Tomorrow" by Joseph Conrad, 1966, which won many European awards and was turned into a film).

A trend for reinterpreting literature emerged. Such works include Pierścień wielkiej damy (after Cyprian Norwid) by Ryszard Bukowski, Edward Bogusławski's Sonata Belzebuba (after Witkacy, 1977), Zbigniew Bargielski's Mały Książę (after Le Petit Prince by Antoine de Saint-Exupéry, 1970) and Krzystof Baculewski's Nowe Wyzwolenie (New Liberation, 1986).

There also arose a trend for unstaged opera. This led to works for the radio by Grażyna Bacewicz (Przygody Króla Artura -The Adventures of King Arthur, 1959), Jerzy Sikorski (Muzyczna opowieść niemalże o końcu świata - A Musical Tale About the End of the World 1958), Tadeusz Szeligowski (Odys płaczący -Odysseus Weeping 1961) and Zbigniew Penherski (Sąd nad Samsonem - Judgement on Samson 1969). Television operas were also written by Krzystof Meyer (the famous Cyberiad after the science-fiction stories by Stanisław Lem, 1970) and Maciej Małecki (Balladyna, 1999).

== Krzysztof Penderecki ==
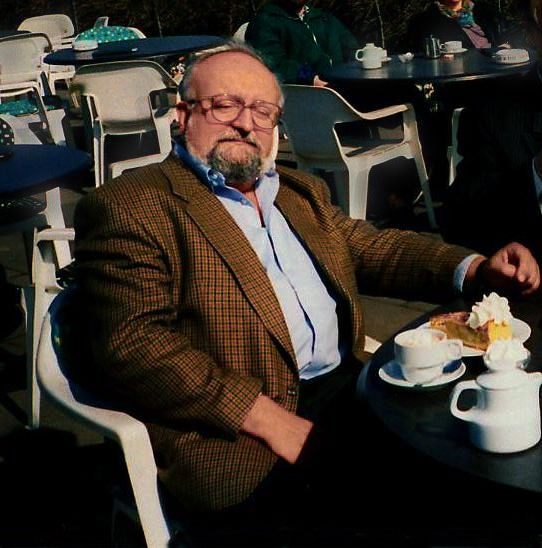
Krzysztof Penderecki

Sonorist opera was created by Krzysztof Penderecki, who composed one of the most famous contemporary operas in 1969: Diabły z Loudun (The Devils of Loudun, libretto by John Whiting after the book by Aldous Huxley). The opera, inspired by Wagner and psychoanalysis, makes extensive use of sonorism. It provoked a great deal of discussion among critics and the composer's next work was eagerly awaited. The Devils of Loudun immediately became a classic of contemporary opera thanks to its innovative style. To aid his sonorist experiments, Penderecki's created a new way of notating music. The opera was later filmed. Penderecki's next opera Paradise Lost also received good reviews. The next stage in Penderecki's development was Die schwarze Maske, first performed in Salzburg during The Summer Festival in 1986 to mixed reactions.

When Penderecki abandoned sonorism he decided to compose a "Polish" opera. Ubu Rex is based on the farce by Alfred Jarry, Ubu roi, which takes place in Poland. The opera was in German, although the librettist, Jerzy Jarocki, was Polish. The opera received a mixed response: some greeted it with applause and standing ovations, but other members of the audience angrily walked out of the theatre. Nevertheless, the opera had such a strong reception that it gained the attention of audiences outside Poland.

== Recent developments ==
The most recent composers of opera are Krzystof Knittel, Eugeniusz Knapik and Roman Palester. In 1999, Knittel wrote Heart Piece – Double Opera, which makes use of rock music. Knapik composed the operatic trilogy Das Glas im Kopf wird vom Glas (1990), Silent Screams, Difficult Dreams (1992) and La libertà chiama la libertà (1996). The composer uses English, German and Italian - three traditional operatic languages. Palester wrote Śmierć Don Juana (The Death of Don Juan), a dodecaphonic work to a text by Oscar Milosz, which the composer himself translated from French.

Among the latest major Polish operas are Antygona (2001) by Zbigniew Rudziński, Balthazar and The Trap (2011) by Zygmunt Krauze, Ignorant i Szaleniec by Paweł Mykietyn and Madame Curie (2011) by Elżbieta Sikora.

== See also ==
- List of Poles
