= Maciej Kamieński =

Polish composer (1734-1821)

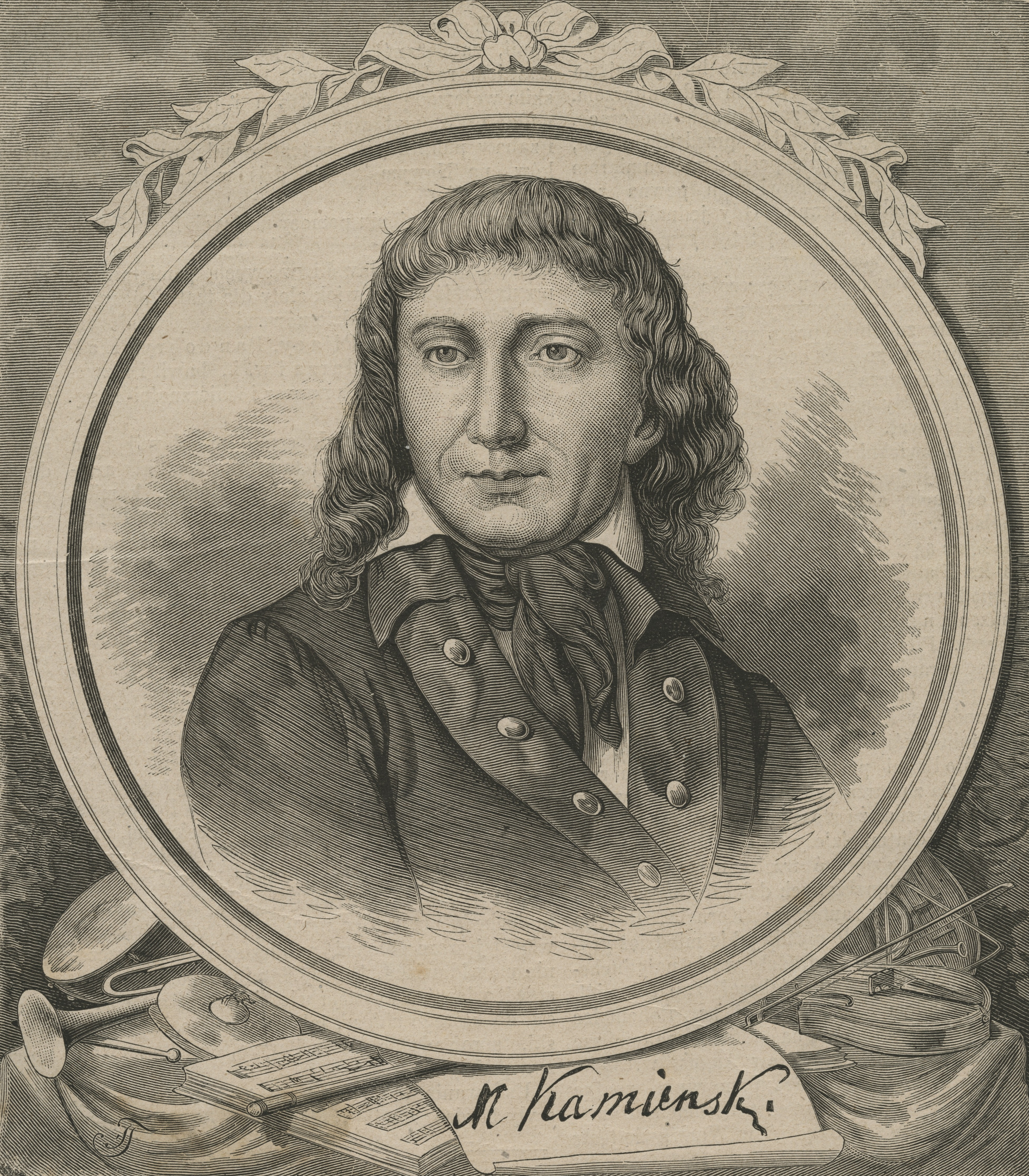

Maciej Kamieński (13 October 1734, Sopron – 25 January 1821, Warsaw) was a Polish classical composer of Slovak origin.

He studied music in Sopron, where his patron was Count Henckl von Donnersmarck. After his death (1760), Kamieński moved to Vienna to continue his education. There in 1762, he heard young Mozart play. He visited Warsaw for the first time in 1773: this year the publishing house of J. Engel issued some harpsichord works by Kamieński (today lost). He gave piano and singing lessons, held an inn in Warsaw (on Świętojerska street) and organized public concerts at Dulfowski manor house.

== Compositions ==
Kamieński's output includes 8 operas (2 German, 6 Polish), which the composer himself called operettas. Nędza uszczęśliwiona (1778) was long considered the first Polish opera to be performed in public theatre. It opened a new era for Polish musical theatre. Kamieński's musical language shows a mixture of styles, from baroque and galant to classical. There are also some characteristics of opera buffa. They all are present in Nędza uszczęśliwiona.

After his successes, Kamieński turned more and more towards folklore, using structures from authentic Polish folk music. It can be clearly seen in Zośka, czyli Wiejskie zaloty (1780), which had 76 performances in Warsaw up to 1820. Coloratura and espressivo arias combine with typical village songs and Polish dances, of which polonaise is the most popular.

Kamieński also composed Krótki rys o egzystencji najpierwszej oryginalnej opery polskiej (A Short Outline of the Original Polish Opera), published in Biblioteka Warszawska, iv (Warsaw, 1878).

Besides operas, he composed some chamber works. His Duma na kształt ronda (Duma in the form of a rondo) shows early Romantic tendencies.

== List of works ==
=== Operas ===
- Nędza uszczęśliwiona (Poverty made Happy), operetta, 2 acts, text by Wojciech Bogusławski after Franciszek Bohomolec; prem. 11 July 1778 (ed. in Opery polskie, ii; Kraków, 1978)
- Zośka, czyli Wiejskie zaloty (Sophia, or Country Courtship), operetta, 1 act, text by S. Szymański; prem. 17 Oct 1780 (lost)
- Prostota cnotliwa (Virtuous Simplicity), operetta, 3 acts, text by Franciszek Bohomolec; prem. 8 Feb 1781 (lost)
- Balik gospodarski (The Burgher’s Ball), comic opera, 3 acts, text by Franciszek Zabłocki, after Le Bal bourgeois (1738) by Charles Simon Favart; prem. 14 Sept 1783 (lost)
- Anton und Antoinette, 1 act, text by A. Słowaczyński, after Toinon et Toinette (1767) by Desboulmiers; written in 1785, unperformed (lost)
- Tradycia dowcipem załatwiona (Tradition Resolved by Humour), operetta, 1 act, text by Franciszek Zabłocki); prem. 27 May 1789 (ed. by J. Prosnak in Kultura muzyczna Warszawy XVIII wieku; Kraków, 1955)
- Słowik czyli Kasia z Hanką na wydaniu (The Nightingale, or Kasia and Hanka, Two Marriageable Girls), operetta, 2 acts, text by M. Witkowski); prem. 19 Jan 1790
- Sultan Wampum, oder Die Wünsche, opera, 3 acts, text by August Kotzebue; written in 1794, unperformed (lost)

=== Choral ===
- Masses, Passion, offertories etc. (lost)
- Kantata w dzień inauguracji statui króla Jana III Sobieskiego (Cantata on the Unveiling of the Statue of Jan III Sobieski), text by A. Naruszewicz; prem. 14 Sept 1788 (overture ed. by J. Prosnak in Kultura muzyczna Warszawy XVIII wieku; Kraków, 1955)

=== Songs with piano ===
- Pieśń na dzień 3 maia na parafie (Song on the Anniversary of the Constitution of 3 May 1792), text by J. Lubański (Warsaw, 1792)
- Czy to nie jest udręczenie (Isn’t it Anguish?; Warsaw, 1805)

=== Piano solo ===
- Duma na kształt ronda (Duma in the Form of a Rondo; Warsaw, 1805; new ed. by H. Feicht in Muzyka staropolska; Kraków, 1966)
- Andante (Warsaw, 1805)

== Bibliography ==
- Barbara Chmara-Żaczkiewicz. Kamieński [Kamięski, Kamenický, Kamenský], Maciej / New Grove Dictionary of Music and Musicians
