= Nędza uszczęśliwiona =

Poverty Made Happy (Polish: Nędza uszczęśliwiona) – Polish opera (operetta) in two acts by Maciej Kamieński. Libretto was written by Wojciech Bogusławski, based on a same-named cantata by Franciszek Bohomolec (1777). Its premiere took place on 11 July 1778 in Radziwiłł Palace in Warsaw.

For two centuries, Nędza uszczęśliwiona was considered the first Polish opera performed in public theatre. In 2005 Jerzy Gołos published an anonymous comic opera (found in a manuscript held in Adam Mickiewicz University in Poznań), which he named Heca albo polowanie na zająca. It dates from c. 1680. There were also two operas by Michał Kazimierz Ogiński staged before Nędza uszczęśliwiona (in Słonim, 1771): Opuszczone dzieci and Filozof zmieniony.

== Roles ==
- Podstarości – baritone
- Anna, poor peasant – soprano
- Kasia, her daughter – soprano
- Jan, wealthy burgher – bass
- Antek, farm worker – tenor

The scene is staged in a noble village.

== Editions ==
- Maciej Kamieński, Wojciech Bogusławski. Nędza uszczęśliwiona: Opera w dwóch aktach. Libretto Wojciecha Bogusławskiego według Franciszka Bohomolca. Kraków: PWM, 140 pp.

== Bibliography ==
- Barbara Chmara-Żaczkiewicz. Kamieński [Kamięski, Kamenický, Kamenský], Maciej / New Grove Dictionary of Music and Musicians
