= Rafał Augustyn =

Rafał Augustyn may refer to:

- Rafał Augustyn (composer) (born 1951), Polish composer, pianist, writer and scholar of Polish philology
- Rafał Augustyn (racewalker) (born 1984), Polish race walker
