= Court of Cassation (Duchy of Warsaw) =

Highest court of the Duchy of Warsaw, established in 1810

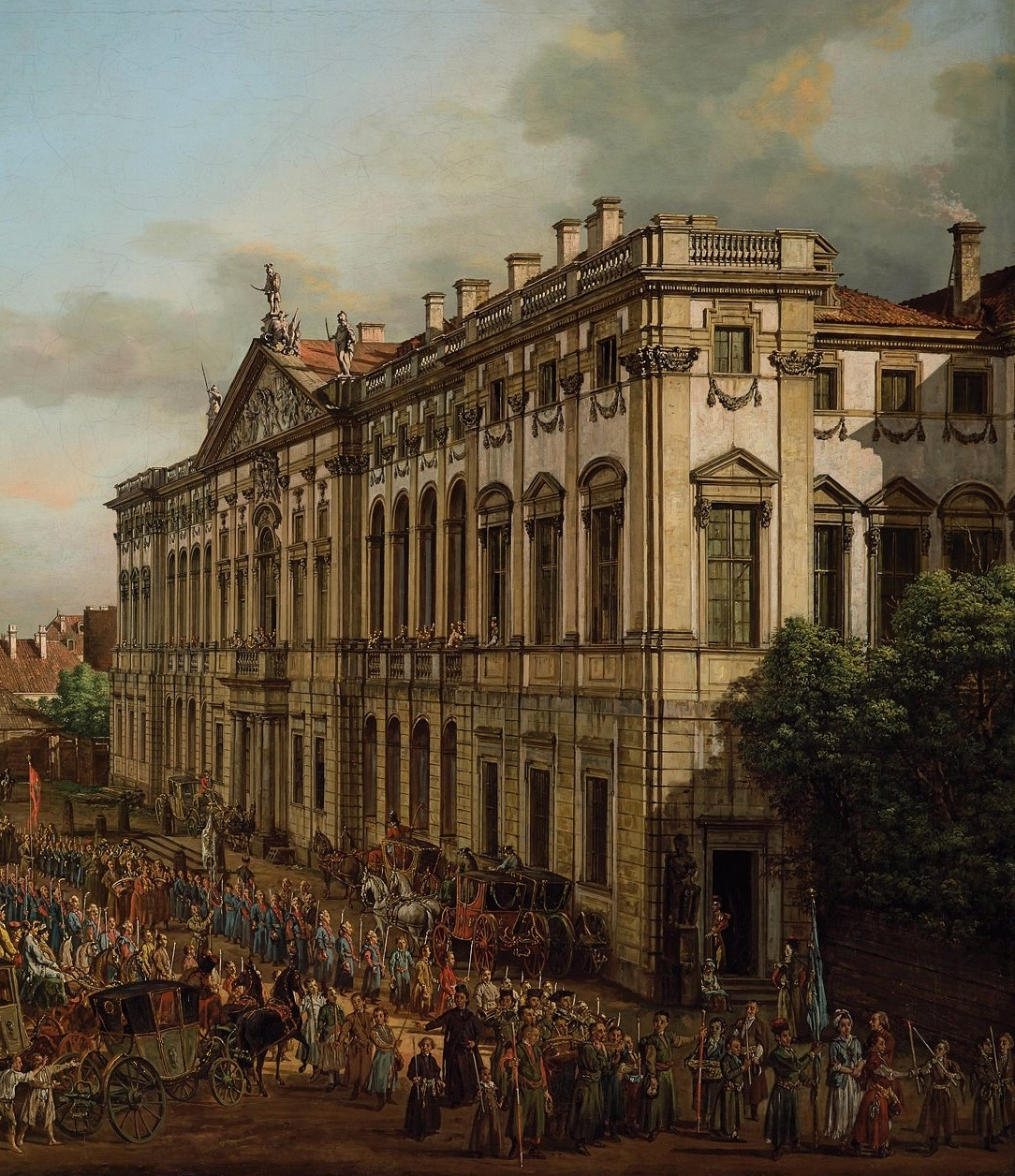
- Krasiński Palace, the seat of the Court of Cassation
- Established: 1810
- Dissolved: 1812/1813
- Jurisdiction: Duchy of Warsaw
- Location: Warsaw
- Authorised by: Decree of Frederick Augustus I dated 3 April 1810
- Appeals from: Courts issuing final judgments
- Number of positions: President of the Council of State; 6 ministers 12 (later 11) state councillors
- Language: Polish

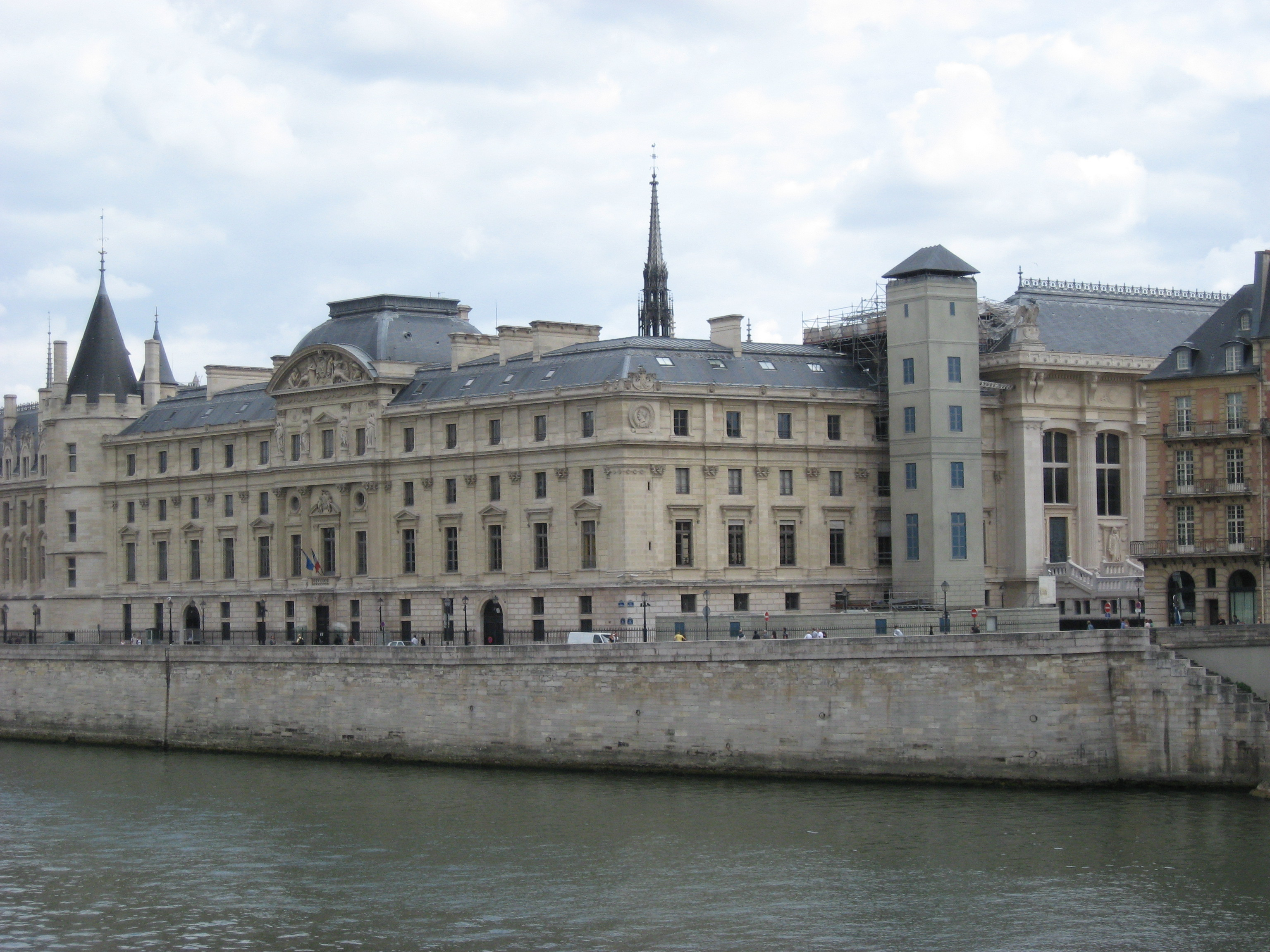
The seat of the French Court of Cassation, which served as a model for the Warsaw Court of Cassation

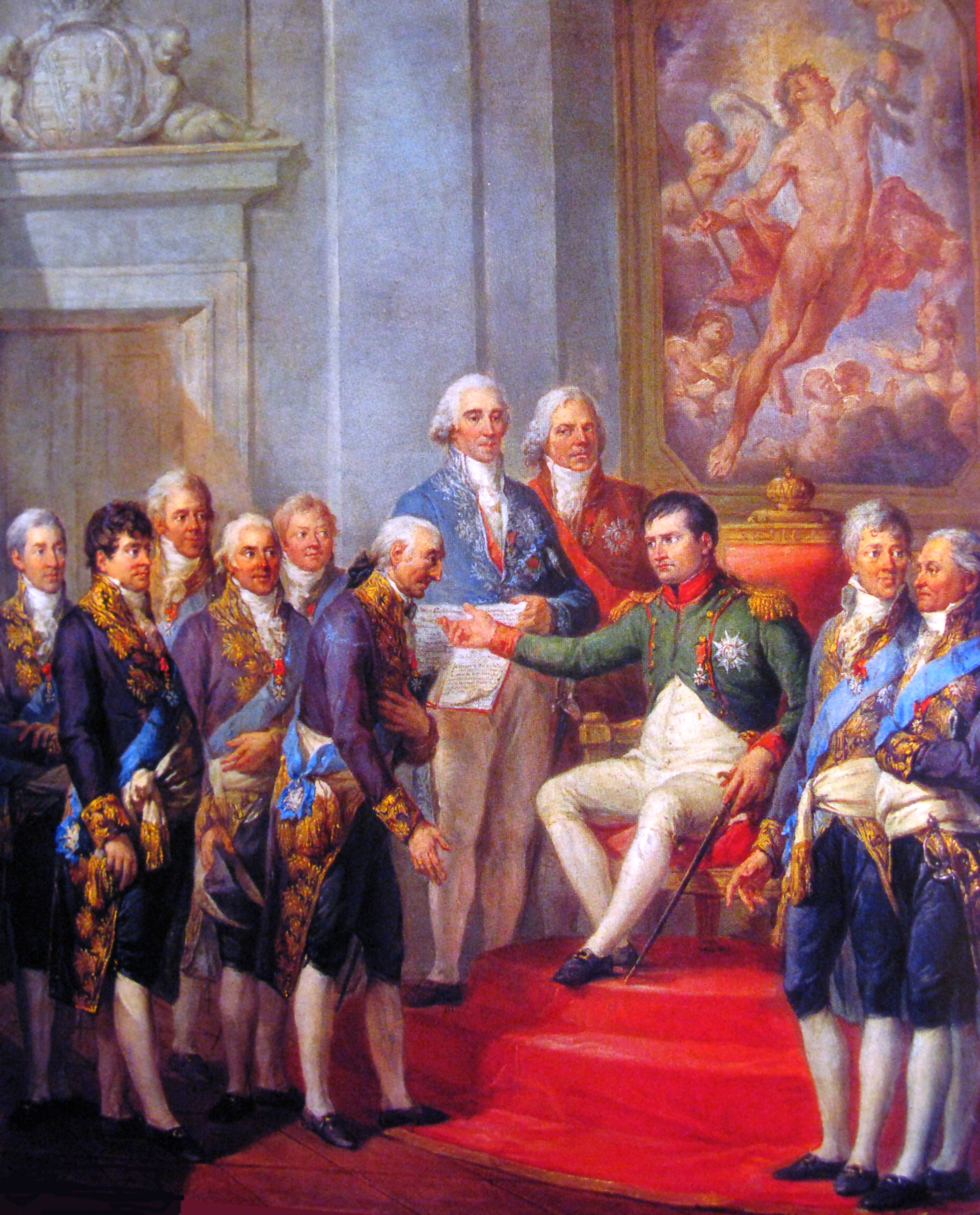
Napoleon Bonaparte granting the constitution to the Duchy of Warsaw, the legal basis for the Court of Cassation

The Court of Cassation (Polish: Sąd Kasacyjny; in contemporary orthography: Sąd Kassacyyny) was the highest judicial authority in the Duchy of Warsaw, established by a decree of Duke Frederick Augustus I on 3 April 1810, pursuant to Article 16 of the Constitution of the Duchy of Warsaw. The court reviewed cassation appeals from both civil and criminal courts, resolved jurisdictional disputes between courts, and served as a disciplinary court for judges and the prosecutor of the Court of Appeal.

The court operated for a brief period, even by the standards of the short-lived Duchy of Warsaw: its activities formally commenced on 19 June 1810, and its last published judgment was issued on 16 October 1812.

Despite its short existence, the court played a significant role in shaping the Polish judicial system by introducing the enduring concept of cassation. The modern Polish Supreme Court traces its legacy to the Court of Cassation.

== History ==
Following the Treaties of Tilsit on 7 July 1807, the Duchy of Warsaw was established on most of the territories of the second and third Prussian partitions. Frederick Augustus I of Saxony, King of Saxony and an ally of Napoleon Bonaparte, was appointed head of state. The Duchy was expanded under the Treaty of Schönbrunn to include territories from the third Austrian Partition. It ceased to exist in 1813 after being occupied by Russian forces.

The Duchy was heavily influenced by Napoleonic policies and closely aligned with France. Many provisions in its constitution, including those related to the Court of Cassation, were adapted from the French system.

== Legal basis ==
Neither the Council of State, the Court of Cassation, nor the concept of cassation existed in the Polish–Lithuanian Commonwealth. These institutions were imported from France, where the Court of Cassation was established in 1790 (renamed in 1804). However, the French Council of State was not linked to its Court of Cassation. As Władysław Sobociński notes, French regulations were either "inapplicable" or "scattered across multiple acts", posing challenges for the Duchy's legislators in creating a novel and comprehensive system while accounting for the Council of State's limited capacity.

=== Legislative process ===
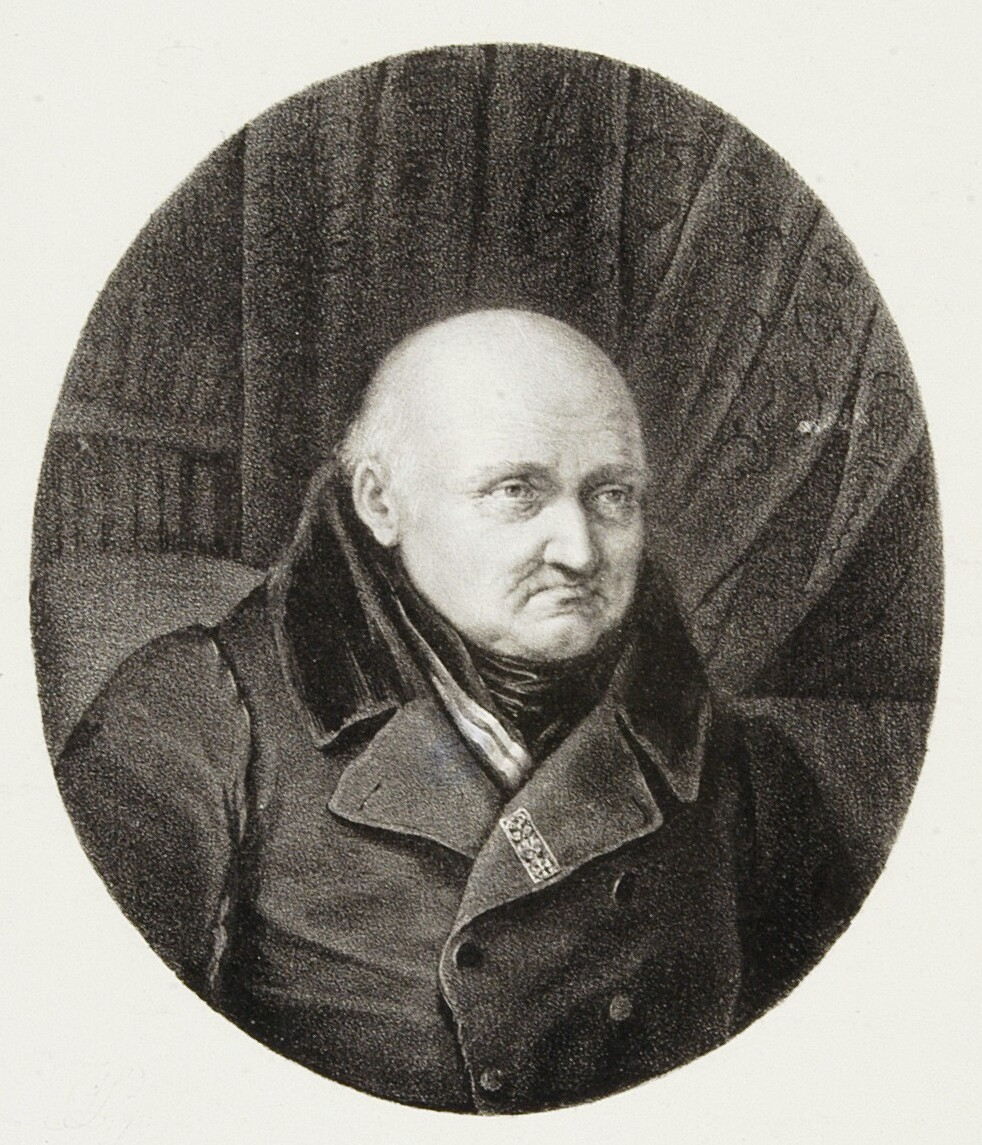
Józef Kalasanty Szaniawski, cassation prosecutor, who significantly influenced the development of the Court of Cassation's operational framework

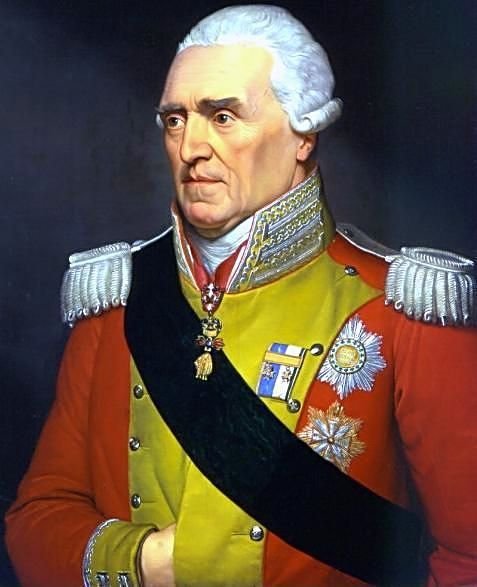
Frederick Augustus, Duke of Warsaw, under whose authority the decree regulating the Court of Cassation was issued on 3 April 1810

The first draft of the act defining the Court of Cassation, titled Description of the Court of Cassation in the Council, was presented by Minister of Justice Feliks Łubieński at a Council of State meeting on 8 January 1808. It proposed strengthening the court's role, notably by emphasizing the position of the cassation prosecutor. On 19 March 1808, Józef Kalasanty Szaniawski was appointed cassation prosecutor. Ambitious politically, Szaniawski used his position to criticize Łubieński, complicating the legislative process.

As cassation appeals accumulated without resolution, the Council of State, on 30 June 1808, instructed the Preparatory Commission – operating under the Minister of Justice – to draft a new proposal. Łubieński presented this draft to the Duke in September 1808, omitting provisions that would enhance the cassation prosecutor's role. The draft was returned to the Preparatory Commission for revision and resubmitted on 16 October.

The legislative process was paused during the Austro-Polish War. In August 1809, final revisions were made to the document titled Ordinance of the Court of Cassation, authored by referendary Onufry Wyczechowski. On 29 August 1809, the Council of State submitted the 104-article act for approval, with minor amendments ordered by the Duke until April 1810. Sobociński suggests that these revisions, which did not align with Łubieński's preferences, may have been influenced by Szaniawski.

=== Decree of 3 April 1810 ===
On 3 April 1810, Duke Frederick Augustus signed the decree regulating the Court of Cassation. Chapters one and two outlined the court's composition and the grounds for cassation. Chapter three detailed procedures for civil, criminal, and three special proceedings. Chapter four addressed the statute of limitations for appeals related to pre-decree cases. The decree also established an independent chancery and the position of court clerk, separate from those of the Council of State.

Cassation appeals could be filed against final judgments from all levels of civil and criminal courts, as the Duchy's judiciary was two-tiered. Article 10 listed grounds for cassation, including violations of procedural law during the trial or in the judgment, incorrect legal syllogism or interpretation of substantive law, rulings beyond or outside the party's claims, issuing a non-final judgment as final, issuing a final judgment in the first instance when only a non-final judgment was permissible, rulings by an incompetent court, or issuing contradictory judgments based on the same evidence and parties.

These grounds prevented the Court of Cassation from addressing the merits of a case, unlike the German revision system. The court's role was to identify procedural violations, cite relevant provisions, and remand the case to a court of equal rank or the same court with a different panel. Its judgments were not final, allowing cases to return up to three times. On the third review, the court referred the case to the Duke for a binding interpretation applicable to similar future cases.

Artur Korobowicz argues that the Court of Cassation was not a judicial instance. Sobociński notes that its structure limited substantive rulings to two instances, ensuring uniformity in legal application, which was crucial given resistance from lower courts.

The court convened in five-member panels, with judgments decided by a simple majority. For second and third reviews, it sat in nine-member panels.

== Seat and operations ==
The Court of Cassation was based at the Krasiński Palace in Warsaw, also the seat of the Council of State. Its activities commenced on 19 June 1810, with cassation prosecutor Szaniawski greeting attendees at the entrance and Minister Łubieński delivering a ceremonial address. The event was attended by the full court, its officials, court delegates, advocates who took their oaths, and the public.

Court sessions were held on Fridays, as stipulated in the decree organizing the Council of State. The first judgment, dismissing a cassation appeal, was issued on 21 August 1810.

== Jurisdiction ==
=== Cassation proceedings ===
For civil judgments, appeals had to be filed within three months of the judgment's delivery. Appeals were submitted to the court's chancery and signed by an advocate. Filing did not suspend enforcement, except in divorce cases.

For criminal judgments, the convicted party (within 10 days) or the prosecutor (within 15 days) could file an appeal. The appeal could be signed by the convicted party, their proxy, defense counsel, or the prosecutor. Filing suspended enforcement. Appeals were submitted to the court that issued the contested judgment.

Appeals were reviewed by the cassation prosecutor, whose recommendations were presented by the court clerk to the president, who appointed a referendary to refer the case to the Petitions and Instructions Commission.

Established under Article 34 of the 3 April decree, this commission comprised the Council of State president or a member and referendaries, with the option to expand its composition. It assessed the appeal's validity in closed sessions and, if deemed valid, presented it to the court for acceptance or rejection. The court's chancery recorded all commission activities in a dedicated log.

==== Civil proceedings ====
If the court accepted a civil appeal, the appellant provided a copy to the opposing party, who had 15 days to respond if residing in Warsaw, with an additional day for every two miles of distance. Advocates could exchange up to two pleadings, each within eight days. The referendary submitted the case file to the Petitions and Instructions Commission, which could order supplementation or prepare a report for the prosecutor and the court. Once filed, the case was scheduled for a hearing.

Proceedings were written and public. The referendary presented the case at the first hearing, with advocates limited to submitting notes on procedural errors. Judgments were decided by majority vote without public or party presence, reflecting Old Polish traditions. Simple cases were decided immediately, with judgments sent to the Minister of Justice for publication.

==== Criminal proceedings ====
Criminal proceedings were streamlined. The court issuing the contested judgment forwarded the appeal to the Court of Cassation via the Minister of Justice. The Petitions and Instructions Commission prepared a report directly for the court.

Hearings were public but held without the convicted party. Only the referendary and cassation prosecutor could speak. Judgments were sent to the prosecutor via the Minister of Justice. Most criminal appeals were dismissed.

=== Additional jurisdiction ===
The court oversaw jurisdictional disputes between ordinary and military courts and could reassign cases due to recusal of most judges in a panel. It served as a disciplinary court for the president, judges, and prosecutor of the Court of Appeal, as well as justices of the peace, with powers to suspend, indict, or dismiss them (with the Duke's approval) in nine-member panels.

Article 24 required the court to submit annual remarks on legislative deficiencies, but this provision remained unenforced due to conflicts between Council of State members and the Minister of Justice, as noted by Marian Kallas.

== Composition ==
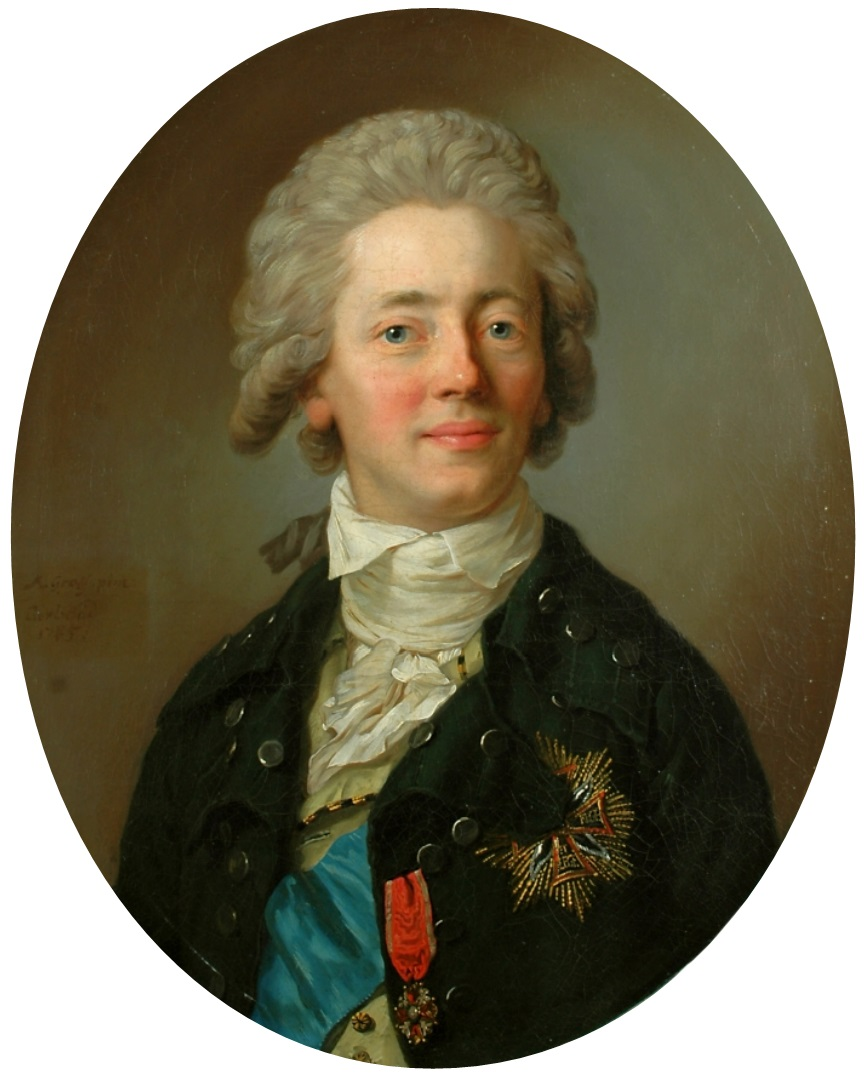
Stanisław Kostka Potocki, President of the Council of State and presiding officer of the Court of Cassation

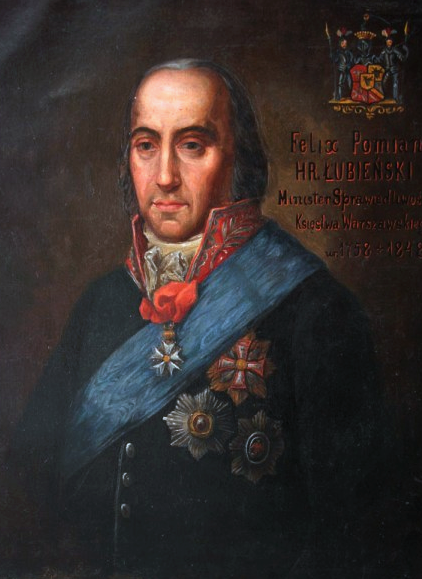
Feliks Franciszek Łubieński, Minister of Justice, a member of the judging panel and a key architect of the court's framework

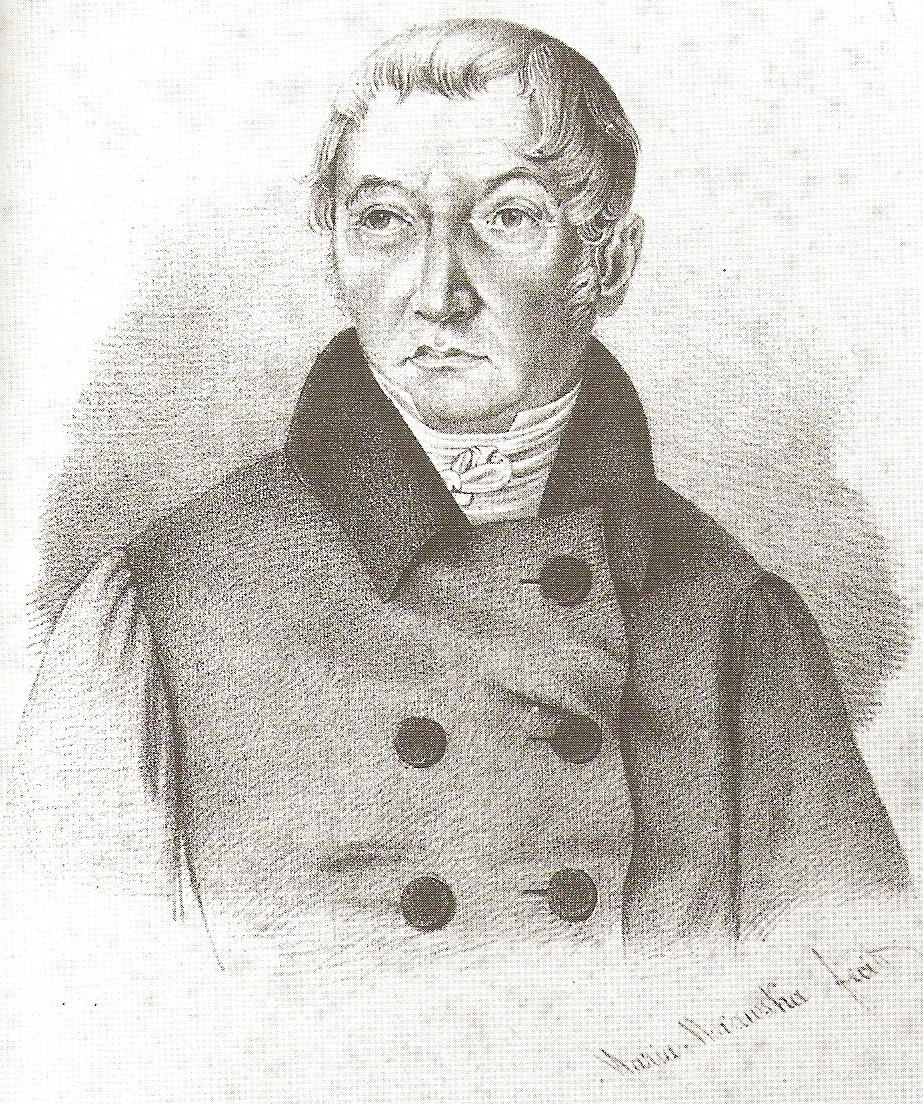
Kajetan Koźmian, referendary of the Court of Cassation

=== Legislative stage ===
The Council of State, comprising seven members – five managing administrative portfolios and one residing in Dresden – was deemed insufficiently agile to function as the Court of Cassation. Debates during the legislative process focused on additional roles for the Council or the court.

Łubieński's initial draft proposed a strong cassation prosecutor and four referendaries, one specializing in civil and one in criminal cases, alongside auditors as prospective officials with advisory roles. A proposed "disputes commission", modeled on the French Commission des affaires contentieux, would decide appeal admissibility. Łubieński prioritized auditors, but on 12 August 1808, the Duke appointed six state councillors as full Council members. The cassation prosecutor was tasked with protecting state interests and prosecuting judicial misconduct, reflecting French revolutionary norms. A later draft suggested a court police force.

=== Judging panel ===
State councillor and minister positions were political and did not require legal training. The Duke appointed and dismissed them, with ministers exclusively able to deputize for the president. In early 1810, following the annexation of West Galicia, six additional councillors were appointed, bringing the court's composition to 19. After minor reshuffles in 1811, the court stabilized at 18 members.

Most members were nobles, except for Stanisław Staszic, a burgher. Some had legal training or administrative experience. The judging panel included President Stanisław Kostka Potocki, ministers Feliks Łubieński, Jan Paweł Łuszczewski, Prince Józef Poniatowski, Aleksander Potocki, Jan Węgleński, Secretary of State Stanisław Breza, and 12 state councillors: Michał Kochanowski, Aleksander Linowski, Tadeusz Matuszkiewicz, Walenty Rzętkowski, Ignacy Sobolewski, Canon Jan Paweł Woronicz (appointed 1808), Marcin Badeni, Franciszek Grabowski, Franciszek Łuba, Stanisław Staszic, Franciszek Taczanowski, and General Józef Wielhorski (appointed 1810). In 1811, Matuszkiewicz replaced Węgleński as Minister of Treasury, and Sobolewski succeeded Potocki as Minister of Police.

=== Court officials ===
The role of the four referendaries, described as "assigned" or "attached" in the constitution, was clarified in the 3 April 1810 decree as non-judicial, tasked with presenting and explaining cases, requiring legal training. On 27 December 1807, Aleksander Linowski, Józef Ignacy Morawski, Karol Fryderyk Woyda, and Onufry Wyczechowski were appointed referendaries. Linowski was soon replaced by Stanisław Staszic, and on 26 May 1810, Kajetan Koźmian and Maksymilian Lewicki, former Commonwealth advocates, joined. When Staszic became a state councillor and Wyczechowski headed the Court of Appeal's Fourth Department, Michał Woźnicki and Antoni Wyczechowski were appointed, with Jan Stawiski replacing Woźnicki in 1811.

The cassation prosecutor, Józef Szaniawski since 1808, took a 12-week leave shortly after the court's inauguration and resigned in June 1811 to serve as Stanisław Zamoyski's plenipotentiary. His successor, Michał Woźnicki, faced stricter scrutiny, with the court often ruling against his submissions.

The court clerk, managing the chancery, had an advisory role and recorded judgments, a position akin to judicial with legal expertise requirements. Ludwik Osiński held this role from 25 September 1809. Jakub Adamczewski briefly served as assistant clerk, also supporting the Council of State's chancery, followed by Rafał Trzciński as secretary.

=== Bar ===
Under Article 5 of the decree, 12 advocates exclusively handled cassation appeals. Signing baseless appeals could lead to warnings, reprimands, or removal after three offenses. Advocates without legal training but with practical experience were admitted. On 31 December 1809, Łukasz Bogusławski (25 accepted appeals), Ksawery Kiedrzyński (31 appeals), Antoni Łabęcki, Adam Mędrzecki, and Jan Zwierzchowski (23 appeals) were appointed. On 12 May 1810, Court of Appeal advocates Szymon Grocholski and Alojzy Orchowski (who declined) were added. Later, Kajetan Kozłowski, Wojciech Wasiutyński, Franciszek Dornfeld, Jan Hakenszmit, Leonard Zieliniewski, and Filip Jasiński (January 1812) joined.

== Summary of activities ==
Judgments and resolutions were published in the Journal of the Court of Cassation's Judgments. Two volumes covered rulings up to the end of 1811 and 16 October 1812. Of 427 appeals (294 civil, 133 criminal), 194 were adjudicated (94 civil, 100 criminal), with the rest pending due to time constraints of the judging panel. Of these, 163 judgments were published, with discrepancies attributed to settlements or unsigned appeals.

Jan Jakub Litauer praised the court's impartiality and diligence, noting its ability to rule in the spirit of the law across diverse legal systems without addressing case merits. Sobociński commended the precision and Polish language quality of judgments drafted by Ludwik Osiński but noted that conflicts with Łubieński hindered operations.

Józef Bojasiński highlighted the Temporary Government's negative view, established by Russian decree after the Duchy's fall, criticizing the court's slow proceedings and non-intervention in case merits. The practice of remanding cases to courts of equal rank was seen as implying a higher instance. Bojasiński cites 420 appeals with 163 adjudicated, noting the Temporary Government's abolition of cassation on 21 September 1815.

== Bibliography ==
- Korobowicz, Artur (2007). "Polskie Sądy Najwyższe w XIX stuleciu. Sąd Kasacyjny Księstwa Warszawskiego (1810–1813)" [Polish Supreme Courts in the 19th Century: Court of Cassation of the Duchy of Warsaw (1810–1813)]. Sąd Najwyższy Rzeczypospolitej Polskiej. Historia i współczesność [Supreme Court of the Republic of Poland. History and Present Day] (in Polish). Toruń: Dom Organizatora TNOiK. ISBN 978-83-7285-354-7.
- Sobociński, Władysław (1964). Historia ustroju i prawa Księstwa Warszawskiego [History of the System and Law of the Duchy of Warsaw] (in Polish). Toruń: Roczniki Towarzystwa Naukowego w Toruniu. ISSN 0081-6671.
