= Jan Stefani =

Polish composer

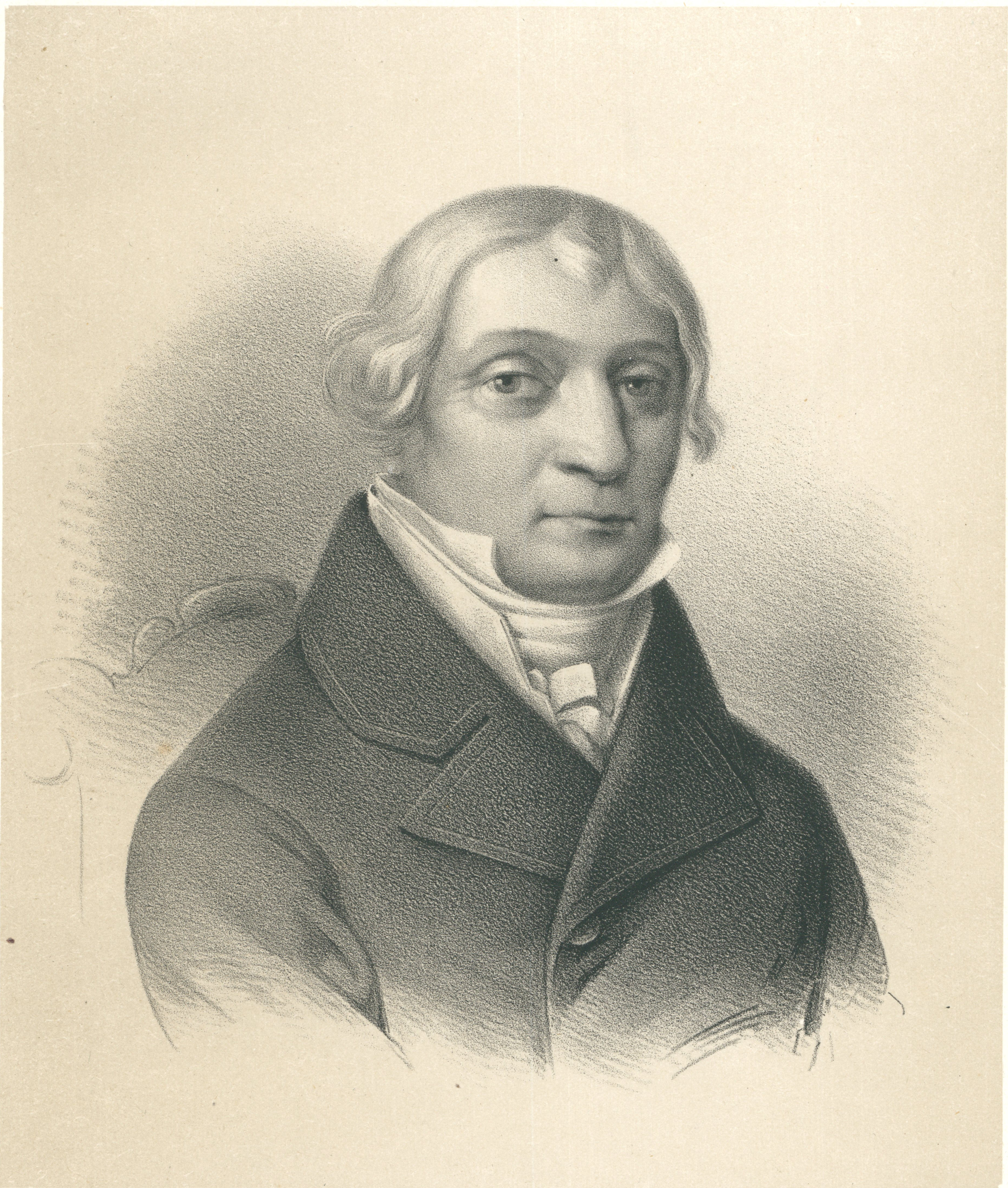
- Born: c. 1746; Prague, Bohemia
- Died: 23 February 1829 (aged 82–83); Warsaw, Poland
- Occupation: Composer

Jan Stefani (c. 1746-1829) was a Polish composer and violinist.

== Life ==
Stefani was born in Prague, and probably studied music there before moving to Italy. Around 1765, he was employed by Franz Joseph, Count Kinsky as a military bandmaster. Also, he would become a violinist at the court of Joseph II.

In Vienna, Prince Andrzej Poniatowski offered him a position in the Polish Royal Court. Stefani accepted, and in 1779 went to Warsaw with a group of musicians. He joined King Stanisław II August's nine-person band, which developed into a court orchestra. In 1795, the Third Partition of Poland caused this orchestra to disband.

For the next four years, Stefani wrote music for St. John's Archcathedral. After Wojciech Bogusławski became director of the National Theatre in 1799, Stefani played with the first violins. He kept this position until 1818.

Stefani died on 23rd February 1829. He is buried in the Powązki Cemetery in Warsaw.

== Works ==
Stefani is renowned for one work, the singspiel Cud mniemany, czyli Krakowiacy i Górale (The Supposed Miracle, or Cracovians and Highlanders), composed in 1794 with a libretto by Bogusławski. The opera is set in Kraków, where the two lovers Stach and Basia, who are prevented from marrying by Basia's stepmother, Dorota. Stach and Basia seek help from Bardos, a physics student, whose initial solution was to use electricity. However, Bardos' growing care for the villagers causes him to abandon the plan.

Other than that, he composed:

- 9 other operas
- ballets, overtures, and other theatrical music
- cantatas
- masses and offertories (for St. John's Archcathedral)
- salon music
