= Ludwik Osiński =

Polish poet (1775–1838)

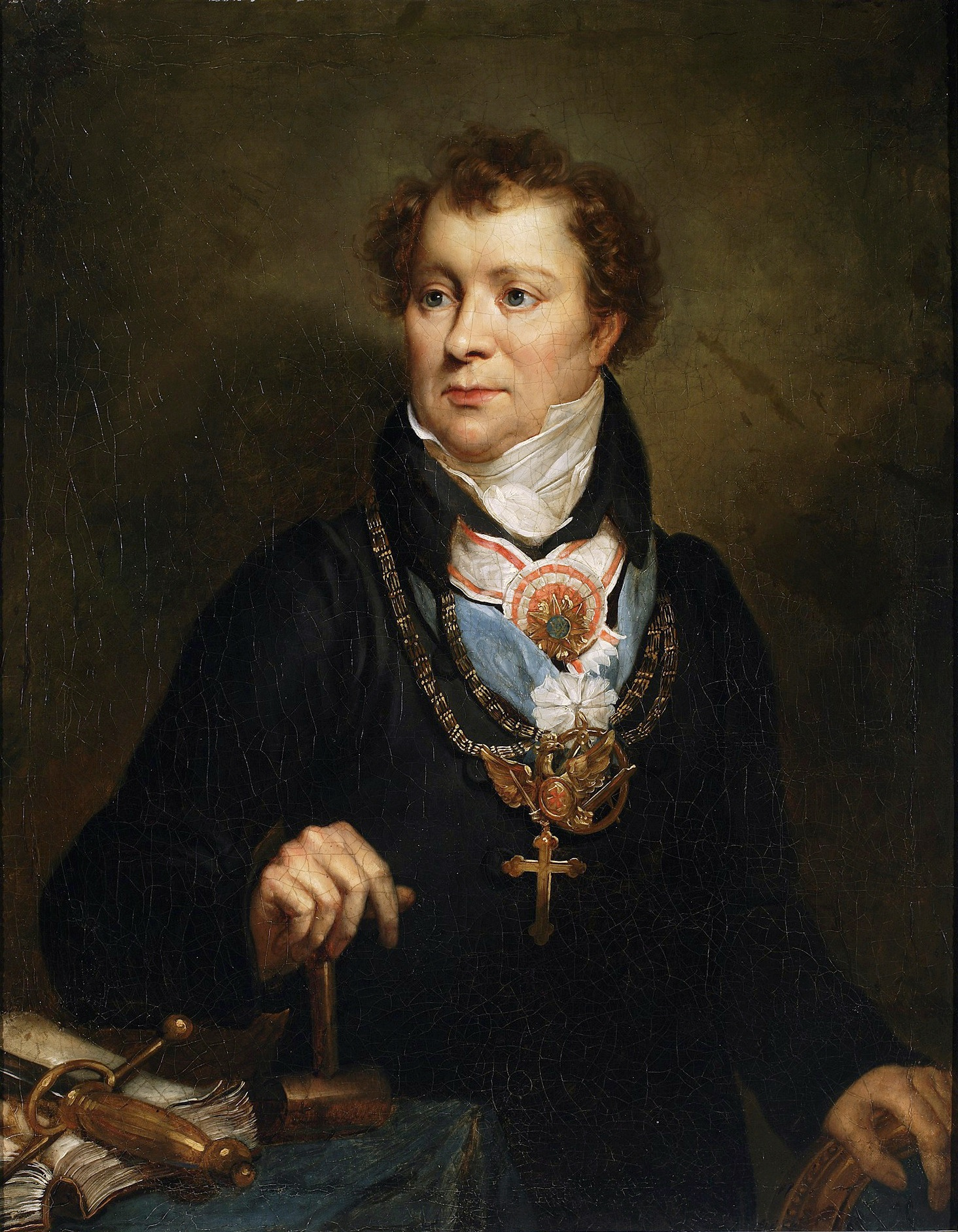
Ludwik Osiński; portrait by Antoni Brodowski (c. 1820)

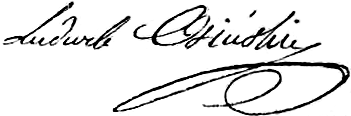
Signature

Ludwik Osiński (24 August 1775, Kock - 27 November 1838, Warsaw) was a Polish literary critic, historian, literary theorist, translator, poet, playwright and speaker, who also served as a minister in the government of Congress Poland.

== Biography ==
He received his primary education in Piarist schools; probably in Łomża, although some sources say Radom.

In 1794, he participated in the Kościuszko Uprising; serving in a militia unit led by Andrzej Karwowski on the front at Narew. From 1801 to 1807, he and the educator, Konstanty Wolski, operated a boarding house for young men in Warsaw; teaching Polish literature and language. During this time, he was an active member of the Warsaw Society of Friends of Learning and, from 1804 to 1814, he served as its Secretary.

In 1805, he traveled to Italy and France as a tutor to the future General, Roman Sołtyk. Three years later, he married Rozalię Bogusławski; a daughter of the actor, Wojciech Bogusławski.

During the brief existence of the Duchy of Warsaw, he was an official of the Ministry of Justice; first as Secretary General, then as the recorder for the Court of Cassation. In 1812, he joined the General Confederation of the Kingdom of Poland. From 1812 to 1816, he was an official of the "Great National East of Poland" (Wielki Wschód Narodowy Polski), a Masonic organization. In 1814, he became the manager of the National Theatre and held that position until 1830. He was also a professor at the University of Warsaw and was a popular lecturer.

At first, he was an opponent of the November Uprising but, in 1831, he became President of the insurgent Municipal Council in Warsaw.
