= Michał Kochanowski =

Polish politician

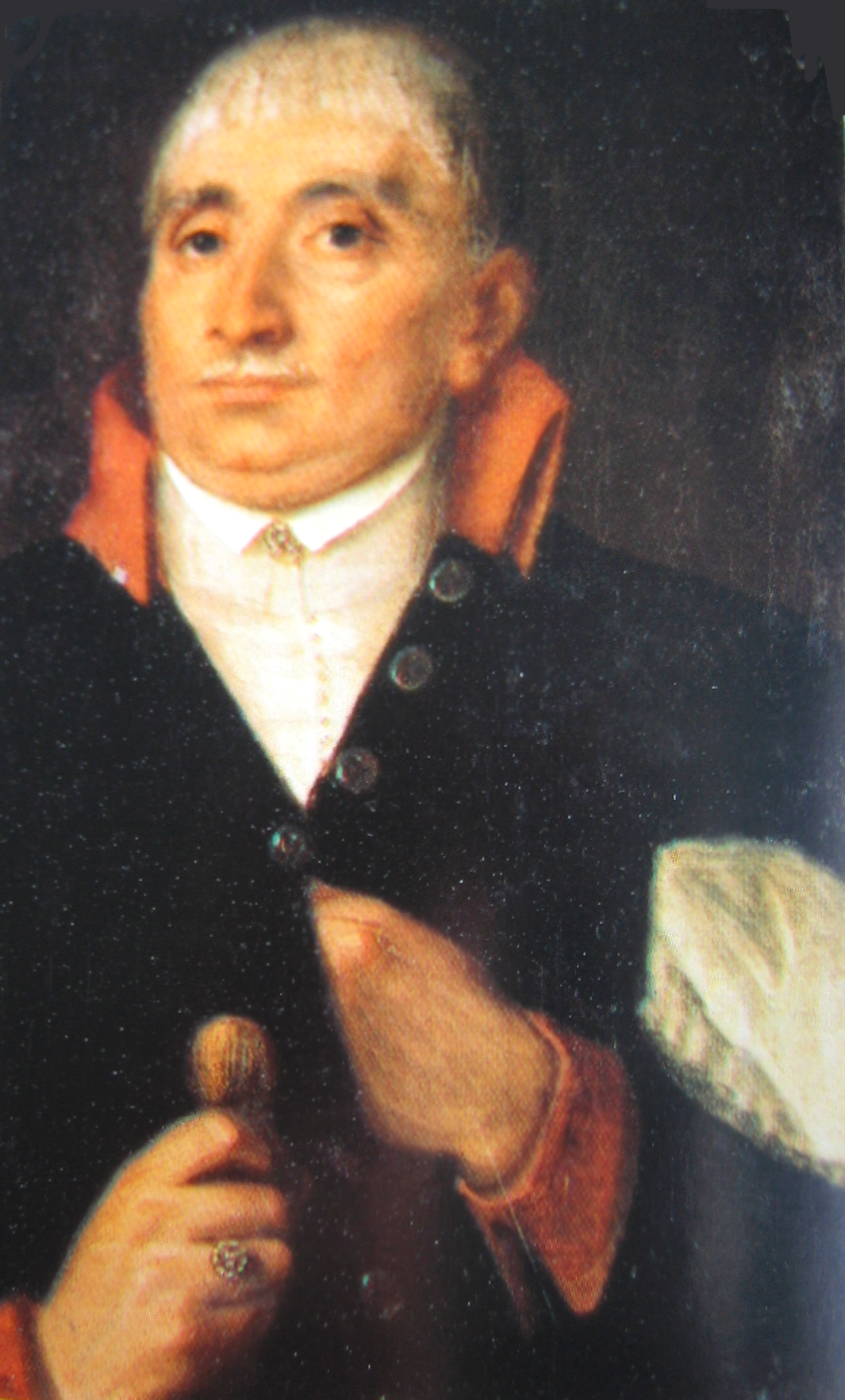

Michał Ambroży Kochanowski (1757–1832) was a Chamberlain of Stanisław August Poniatowski since 1778; deputy to the Great Sejm (1788–1792), councillor of Diplomatic Section of Provisional Temporary Council, member of the Supreme National Council during the Kościuszko Insurrection (1794), member of the government in the Duchy of Warsaw (1808–1815), senator, castellan and voivode in the Congress Poland since 1816, member of the Administrative Council during the November Uprising in 1831.

He was made a member of the Administrative Council on 30 November 1830, by proclamation published in the Warsaw Journals, in the name of Nicholas I.
