= Ryszard Bukowski =

Polish journalist

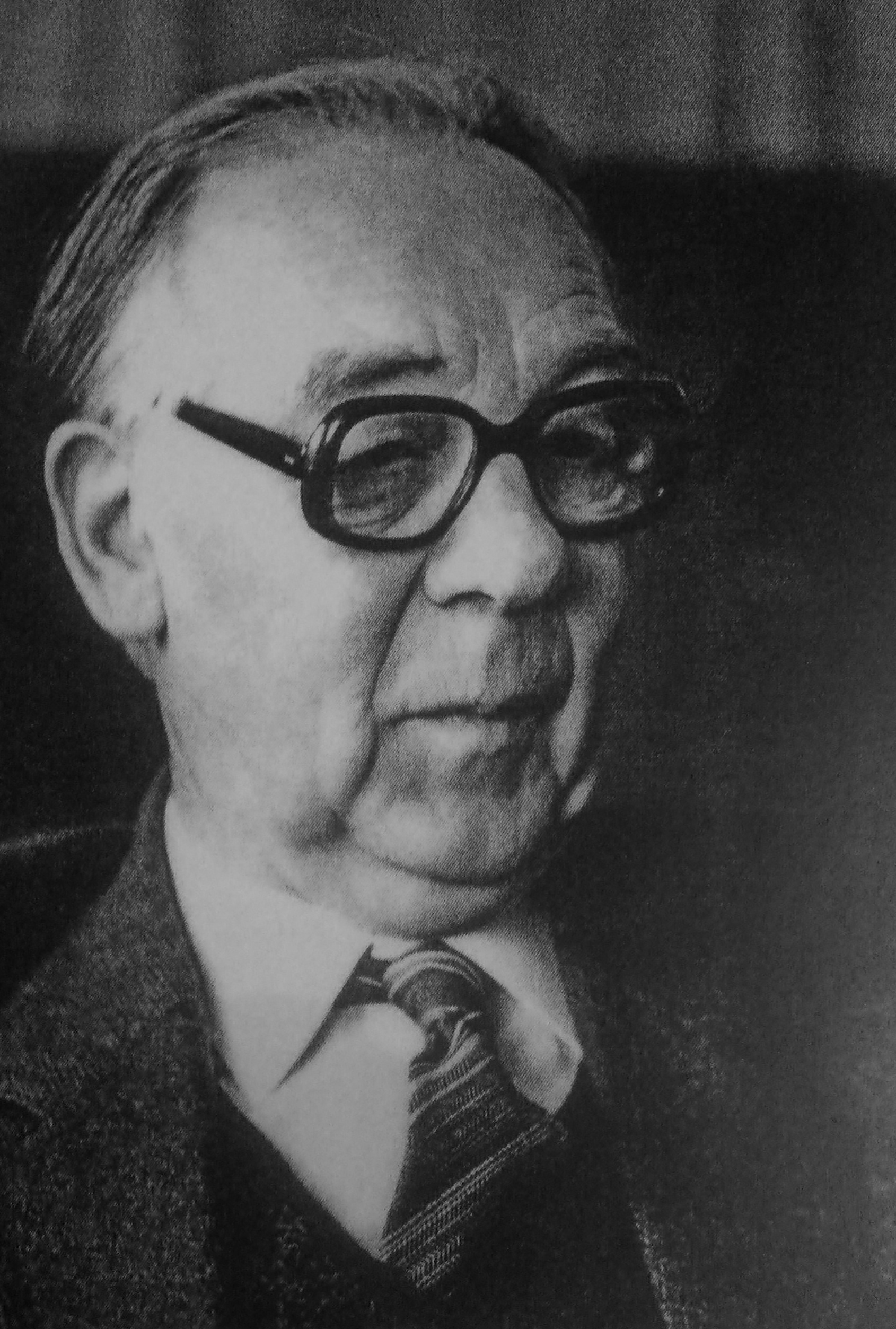
Ryszard Bukowski

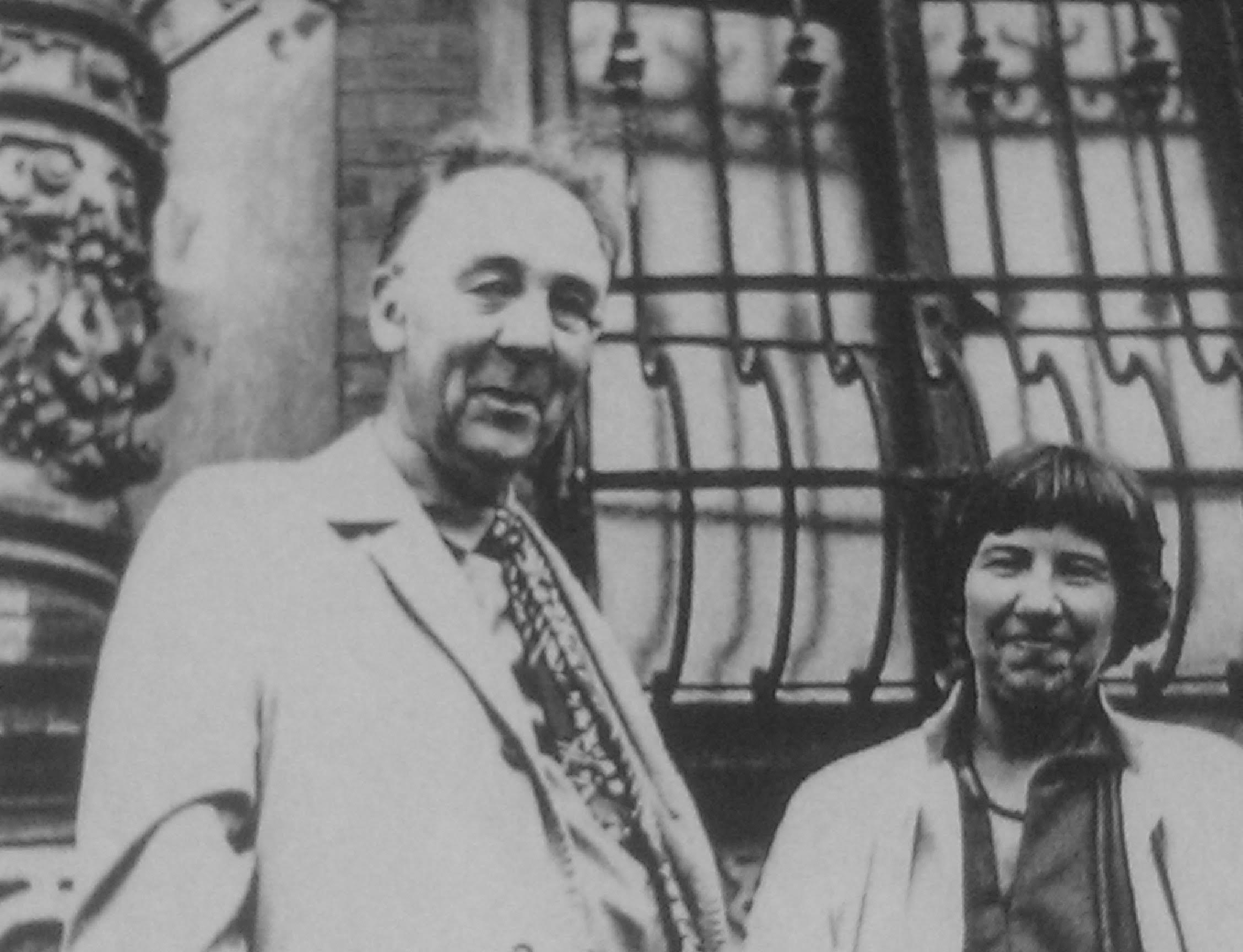
Ryszard Bukowski with his wife Maria Magdalena Janowska-Bukowska

Ryszard Bukowski (2 January 1916 in Cieszkowy – 19 May 1987 in Wrocław) was a Polish composer, teacher, and music critic.

== Biography ==
Ryszard Bukowski was the only child of Stefan Bukowski of the Ossorya coat of arms (1878–1929) and Maria Harriet (Molly) née Schulze (1883–1970). Both his parents were active visual artists; Molly specialised in portraits and book illustrations; Stefan in landscapes. Cieszkowy village in the Pińczów district was also the birthplace of another famous artist, painter and set designer Karol Frycz. The now non-existent Cieszkowy manor, family property, was managed by the eldest of Stefan's brothers, Karol Bukowski. Stefan and Molly spent the Christmas and the New Year of 1915/1916 there; hence it also became the birthplace of the would-be composer, who spent his childhood and youth in Warsaw. His parents were permanently based in the capital. Stefan, and after his death also Molly, taught at the Emilia Plater Secondary School and took part in the city's artistic life. It was in Warsaw that Ryszard lived through the war and the German occupation. After a brief period of residence in Katowice in 1945–1948, he moved with his wife Blanka to Wrocław, where he lived until the end of his life. A memorial plaque has been placed on the frontage of the tenement house at 1, Konstantego Damrota Street, where he resided.

He was married five times; all of his wives were professionally related to music, except for the second. Marina, Blanka (later married name Biskupska), and Maria Magdalena are pianists, Halina was a teacher.

== Education ==
He graduated from the State Junior and Senior Adam Mickiewicz Secondary School in Warsaw, today's Grammar School (Liceum) No. 4, whose graduates included Jan Lechoń, Władysław Broniewski, Miron Białoszewski, Jan Białostocki, Władysław Marconi, Jan Świderski (friend of the composer), Magdalena Zawadzka, Edward Dziewoński, Ryszard Matuszewski, and Kornel Morawiecki. He passed his end-of-school exams in 1935. In 1932-1939 he attended the State Music Conservatory in Warsaw, obtaining a diploma in composition and theory. His composition teacher was Kazimierz Sikorski. His preceptors also included the composer Witold Maliszewski and the composer and music historian Helena Dorabialska.

== Teaching career ==
Bukowski taught throughout his adult life, starting with private lessons and music tutoring in Warsaw under the German occupation. After the war, in 1945–1947 in Katowice he taught theoretical subjects at the State Secondary Music School and at the State Higher School of Music (PWSM) (today's Karol Szymanowski Academy of Music). He also taught English, since he had been bilingual from childhood thanks to his mother, a native Englishwoman. In the school year of 1947-1948 he taught at the Mieczysław Karłowicz State Music School. After moving to Wrocław in 1948, he took over the management of the Stanisław Moniuszko School of Music at 68, Podwale Street. He also directed it after the school's nationalisation in October 1951, when it became the State Secondary Music School. Today, this school bears his name as the Ryszard Bukowski State Second-Level School of Music.

In the secondary music school he taught, among others, musical forms and special harmony. At the State Higher School of Music (now the Karol Lipiński Academy of Music), which was his main place of employment, he taught – apart from composition – counterpoint, musical work analysis, style studies, special harmony, seminars on criticism and lecturing, as well as other subjects. In the years 1965–1968 he was the dean of the Faculty of Music Education, in 1972–1975 – of the Instrumental Faculty, and in 1975–1978 – of the Faculty of Composition, Conducting and Music Theory. Graduates from his composition class included Jan Antoni Wichrowski (1972), Anna Jastrzębska (1975), and Andrzej Tuchowski (1983). His composition students also included Rafał Augustyn (1971–1974, later a graduate of Katowice's PWSM in the class of Henryk Mikołaj Górecki) and Piotr Drożdżewski (1971–1974, subsequently graduating from Wrocław's PWSM in the class of Leszek Wisłocki). Małgorzata Panek began her studies with Bukowski in 1986, but they were interrupted by the death of her professor, and she completed them with Wisłocki as well.

30 master's theses in music theory were written under his supervision; their authors were, among others, music critics and journalists Ewa Kofin and Beata Smolińska, as well as music theorist Anna Granat-Janki. He taught a wide range of practical and theoretical subjects; a large proportion of students from the Academy of Wrocław thus attended his classes.

He is the author of the manual Metodyka nauczania form muzycznych (Methodology of Teaching Musical Forms).

== Social commitments ==
From 1948 he was a member of the Polish Composers’ Union (ZKP). He held various functions in the authorities of the ZKP's Wrocław Branch, including twice its presidency (1959–1969 and 1986–1987). Together with Radomir Reszke and Tadeusz Natanson he was one of the initiators of the Festival of Music by Composers from the Western Territories, the later Musica Polonica Nova - Festival of Polish Contemporary Music, which is still held today.

== Journalism ==
He wrote reviews in his Katowice period and later, cooperating with the local press at that time. From the 1950s until the end of his life, he was a permanent reviewer for Wrocław-based newspapers, successively: Słowo Polskie, Gazeta Robotnicza, and Wieczór Wrocławia. He shared the latter review column with his wife Maria Magdalena, who later took it over from her husband. In the early 1980s his reviews were also regularly printed in the Wrocław weekly Wiadomości. He published a short series of reports in the monthly Odra, and several texts in the Katowice-based magazine Tak i Nie. He also wrote programme notes for the 1972 Wratislavia Cantans festival.

== Literary works ==
Bukowski wrote poetry at various times in his life. From the interwar years comes an unpublished collection in Young Poland style dedicated to his first wife and entitled Wiersze różne (Various Poems). A small volume of poems with an introduction by Stanisław Srokowski and cover art by Eugeniusz Get-Stankiewicz was published by the Centre for the Open Theatre ‘Kalambur’ in Wrocław (1991). It contains a selection from lyrical cycles written in his later years. To date (2021) it is the only published part of his poetic output.

== Music compositions ==
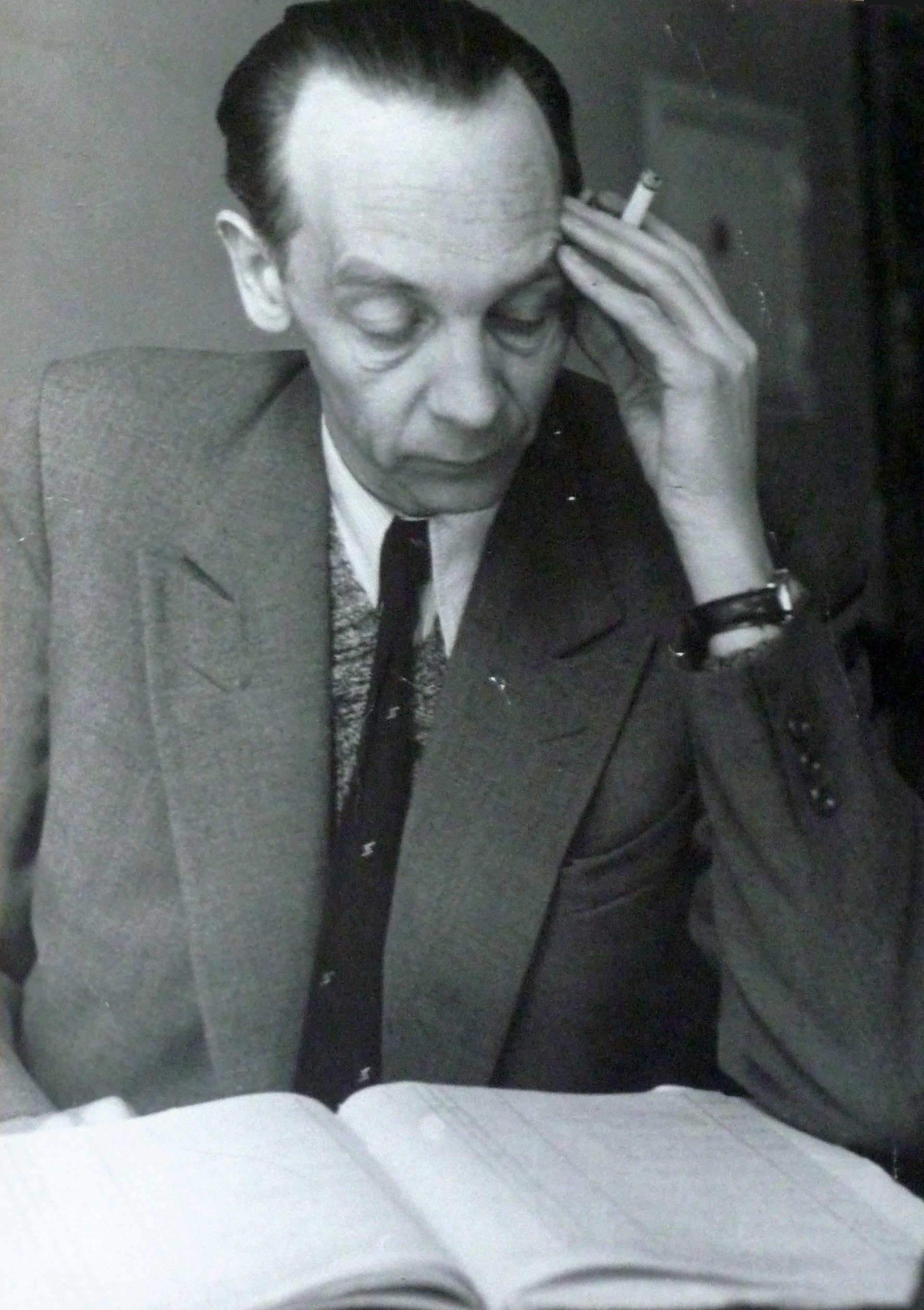
Composer at work

Ryszard Bukowski practised most of the traditional musical genres throughout his life, including solo, chamber, orchestral, choral, and stage music. These works make up characteristic sequences of symphonies, concertante forms, vocal cycles with orchestra or chamber ensembles, choral cycles, string quartets, and piano sonatas. Symphonic and concert forms dominated in his 1970s output, string quartets – in the 1980s. The main body of his piano sonatas (II-VIII) was written in 1974–1977.

He regularly returned to cantata forms. In the 1950s he composed My Evening Song to a text by Jan Kasprowicz. He was, however, one of the few Polish composers in that period who did not write (socialist-realist) mass song or cantatas for specific occasions. In the 1960s he created Metamorphoses to texts of Ovid and Westerplatte, setting words by various authors.

From the 1970s and 80s we have the Passion diptych (St. Matthew and St Mark Passion), preceded by a secular but quasi-religious composition titled Missa profana. In the same period, he created original poetic-musical forms, including in particular the still unperformed (by 2021) settings of poems by Tadeusz Różewicz: Non-Stop Shows and Meeting-Time.

In his vocal music he mainly set texts by Polish poets: Jan Kasprowicz, Konstanty Ildefons Gałczyński, Władysław Broniewski, Leopold Staff, Tadeusz Zelenay, and Stanisław Jerzy Lec. Several times he chose poems by Tadeusz Różewicz and Tymoteusz Karpowicz. The libretto of Missa profana comes from a poem by Stanisław Srokowski. From among foreign authors, he reached for English poetry (T. S. Eliot, Stephen Crane) as well as biblical and ancient Latin texts and their Polish translations.

== Stage music ==
He collaborated (especially in the 1950s and 1960s) with Wrocław theatres (Polish, Contemporary, and Puppet Theatre) as the author of music for spectacles directed by, among others, Edmund Wierciński, Kazimierz Kutz, Szymon Szurmiej, Jakub Rotbaum, Andrzej Witkowski, Halina Dzieduszycka, and Wiesław Hejno.

He wrote four autonomous music theatre works: the opera The Great Lady's Ring, consistently referred to by the composer as a ‘musical drama’, and three ballets: Masks, Career, and Antigone. He also wrote the script for the former two, while the last one was by the choreographer Włodzimierz Traczewski.

His only film score is the music for Jan Batory and Henryk Hechtopf's historical movie Podhale w ogniu (Podhale on Fire) (1955).

== Individual style ==
Bukowski's musical language is quite easily recognisable but assigning his oeuvre to any particular trends would be difficult. Rooted in the neo-stylistic trends of the mid-20th century, with economical use of serial, and marginally also of sonoristic techniques, his compositions are texturally and rhythmically simple, but demonstrate complex dramaturgical structures. His output constitutes a separate phenomenon which calls for a more detailed study. Theoretical analyses emphasise the major role played by polyphony in his works, as represented by numerous examples of the fugueing technique. On the whole, however, his music is essentially dominated by recitative-like, basically single-layered forms, and by sequences of varied episodes. Analytic studies conducted to date should be considered as an introduction to further research. Reception

Bukowski's compositions have mainly been presented in Wrocław, including at its prestigious festivals: Wratislavia Cantans (premieres of both Passions, Missa profana, and the posthumously performed Symphony No. 7) and, most importantly, the Festival of Polish Contemporary Music (today's Musica Polonica Nova). String Quartet No. 3 was premiered at the 1984 ‘Warsaw Autumn’ by the Wilanów String Quartet.

Bukowski's works have been performed, among others, by the Wrocław, Silesian, Cracow, Łódz, Opole and, more recently, Świętokrzyska Philharmonic orchestras, as well as ‘Leopoldinum’ Chamber Orchestra. His stage works were produced by Wrocław Opera.

His music has been conducted by: Andrzej Markowski, Tadeusz Strugała, Marek Pijarowski, Jacek Kaspszyk, Mieczysław Gawroński, Tadeusz Zathey, Marek Tracz, Karol Stryja, Krzysztof Missona, Jerzy Salwarowski, Oldřich Pipek, Jacek Rogala, as well as choirmasters Edmund Kajdasz and Stanisław Krukowski.

Particularly impressive among the soloists performing his works is the list of singers, who have included, among others: Stefania Woytowicz, Delfina Ambroziak, Krystyna Szczepańska, Jadwiga Rappé, Henryka Januszewska, Halina Słoniowska, Barbara Figas, Bożena Betley, Pola Lipińska, Agata Młynarska, Ewa Vesin, as well as Andrzej Hiolski, Henryk Grychnik, Piotr Kusiewicz, Jerzy Mechliński, and Florian Skulski. Maria Magdalena Janowska-Bukowska has significantly contributed to promoting her husband's music, including as a performer of piano concertos and most of the sonatas.

In the years 1992-2001, Ryszard Bukowski Music Days were held in Wrocław, initiated and directed by his wife Maria Magdalena, with the participation mainly of students from music academies. However, the works of the festival's patron only constituted a small proportion of the event's repertoire.

Foreign reception has been limited. Symphony No. 4 had a performance in the Czech city of Pardubice, while Mazovia was released on a Supraphone record.

== Awards and distinctions ==
For his work as a composer, teacher, music journalist, as well as his social activity, Bukowski received many awards and distinctions, among others:

- 1966 – ‘Opole Spring Music’ Competition – 2nd prize for Music in Five Movements for orchestra
- 1968 – ‘Opole Spring Music’ Competition – an honourable mention for Étude for orchestra
- 1969 – Competition of the Stanisław Wiechowicz Choral Song Festival in Międzyzdroje – 2nd prize for the triptych The Third Face for mixed choir
- 1971 – 1st Nationwide Feliks Nowowiejski Composers’ Competition in Gniezno – 3rd prize for Playful Cats for boys’ choir

He was also presented with the City of Wrocław Award and twice the Award of the Minister of Culture and Art (1967, 1971), the Knight's Cross of the Order of Polonia Restituta, the Gold Cross of Merit, Medal of the National Education Commission, as well as the titles Meritorious Culture Activist and Badge of Merit to Wrocław City and Province.

== List of works ==
- Prelude, Chorale and Fugue for piano (or organ) or for strings (1934–35)
- Triptych for solo harp (1952–55)
- Moja pieśń wieczorna [My Evening Song] – cantata for alto solo, mixed choir and orchestra (1953)
- String Quartet No. 1 (1953)
- Overture ‘1939’ for orchestra (1954)
- Sonatina for English horn and piano (1954)
- School Concerto for piano and orchestra (1955)
- Overture ‘Zawisza the Black’ for orchestra (1958)
- Masks – ballet in one act (1958–59)
- Three Serial Dialogues for orchestra (1960)
- Piano Sonata No. 1 (1961–64)
- Interludes before Nightfall for soprano and symphony orchestra (1961)
- Serenade for strings (1962)
- Fifteen Fragments for orchestra (1962)
- Concerto for Harp and Orchestra (1963)
- French Overture for string orchestra (1963–65)
- Invocations for soprano, English horn, harp, percussion and piano (1963)
- Music in Five Movements for orchestra (1966)
- Music for Orchestra – Symphony No. 1 (1968)
- Music for Piano and Orchestra – Piano Concerto No. 1 (1969)
- Metamorphoses – cantata for solo voices, female choir and orchestra (1968)
- Symphonic Étude (1968)
- Variations in Classical Style for female choir (1968)
- Kamienna muzyka [Stone Music] – triptych for mixed choir (1969)
- Twarz trzecia [The Third Face] – triptych for mixed choir* (1969)
- Westerplatte – cantata for soprano, baritone, narrator, female choir, male reciting choir and symphony orchestra (1969)
- Sinfonietta in Classical Style for orchestra (1969)
- Triptych for male choir (1969)
- Double Concerto for oboe, clarinet and orchestra (1970)
- Non-Stop Shows – recitative for alto and baritone solo, commenting voice, 3 choirs and symphony orchestra (1970)
- Concerto for Two String Orchestras and Percussion – Symphony No. 2 (1971)
- Concerto for Trumpet, Jazz Rhythm Section and Orchestra (1971)
- Mazowsze [Mazovia] – cantata for mixed unaccompanied choir* (1971)
- Koty kociłapcie [Playful Cats] for boys’ choir (1971)
- Music for Orchestra – Symphony No. 3 (1972)
- Triple Concerto for trumpet, timpani, piano and orchestra (1972)
- Sacro-song for baritone, speaker, male choir and chamber orchestra (1972)
- Pierścień wielkiej damy [The Great Lady's Ring] – musical drama in three acts (1972–73)
- Symphony No. 4 ‘Choreographic’ (1972)
- Concertino for piano, string orchestra and percussion (1972)
- Concerto for Two Pianos, Percussion and Strings (1974)
- Piano Sonata No. 2 (1974)
- Piano Sonata No. 3 (1974)
- Lyrical Poems for mezzo-soprano or baritone and 13 instruments (1975)
- Piano Sonata No. 4 (1975)
- Six Miniatures for orchestra (1976)
- Symphony No. 5 for bass solo and symphony orchestra (1976)
- Piano Sonata No. 5 (1976)
- Capriccio for soprano and orchestra (1977)
- Five Songs for bass and piano (1977)
- Five Miniatures for piano (1977)
- Piano Sonata No. 6 (1978)
- Career – ballet-pantomime (1978)
- Missa profana for voices, speaker, mixed choir and orchestra (1978)
- Symphonic Sketches for orchestra (1978)
- Concert Overture for orchestra (1978)
- Wind Quintet No. 2 (1978)
- Piano Sonata No. 7 (1979)
- Passio et Mors Domini Nostri Jesu Christi secundum Mattheum for soloists, choir and orchestra (1979)
- String Quartet No. 2 (1980)
- Passio et Mors Domini Nostri Jesu Christi secundum Marcum for soloists, choir and orchestra (1980–81)
- Piano Concerto No. 2 (1980–82)
- Meeting-Time for mixed choir and orchestra (1980–83)
- Symphonic Fresco for orchestra (1982)
- Wyjście z mroku [Leaving the Dark] for soprano and string quartet (1982)
- Piano Sonata No. 8 (1982)
- Symphony No. 6 ‘Brevis’ for string orchestra (1982)
- Z głębi cienia [From the Depths of Shade] for soprano and string quartet (1982)
- String Quartet No. 3 (1983)
- String Quartet No. 4 (1983)
- Piano Sonata No. 9 (1983)
- Sonata for Violin and Piano No. 1 (1983–84)
- Antigone –choreographic drama (1984)
- Psalm 129 for soprano and organ (1984)
- Sonata for Cello and Piano (1984)
- Kopciuszek [Cinderella] – a fairy-tale for piano (1984)
- String Quartet No. 5 (1984–85)
- Piano Sonata No. 10 (1985)
- Three Nocturnes for solo piano or piano with orchestra (1985)
- Pieśń and Pieśniami [Song of Songs] for soprano, flute and piano (1985)
- Sonata for clarinet and piano (1986)
- Sonata for clarinet and string quartet (1986)
- Symphony No. 7 ‘Symphony of Threnodies’ for tenor solo, mixed choir and orchestra (1986)
- Sonata for Violin and Piano No. 2 (1986)
- String Quartet No. 6 (1986)
- Sonata for Violin and Piano No. 3 (1987)

== Discography ==
- Ryszard Bukowski: Mazowsze (on the CD: Soudobá polskaá sborová tvorbá). Perf. Kühnův smíšený sbor, cond. Pavel Kühn. Supraphon 1 12 1865 (1976).
- Ryszard Bukowski: Three Nocturnes, Concertino, Piano Concerto No. 2, Triple Concerto. Maria Magdalena Janowska-Bukowska (piano), Tomasz Woźniak (trumpet), Piotr Robak (timpani). Orchestra of the Świętokrzyska Philharmonic in Kielce, cond. Jacek Rogala. DUX 1683 (2020).
- Mieczysław Karłowicz - Songs, orchestrated by Ryszard Bukowski. Perf. Andrzej Hiolski (baritone), Orchestra of the Opole Philharmonic, cond. Marek Tracz. Polskie Nagrania Muza SX 1584.

== Bibliography ==
- Bukowski Ryszard. In: Elżbieta Dziębowska: Encyklopedia muzyczna PWM [PWM Edition's Music Encyclopaedia]. Vol. 1: AB część biograficzna [AB – Biographical Section]. Kraków: Polskie Wydawnictwo Muzyczne, 1979, p. 450. ISBN 83-224-0113-2. OCLC 468356768. (Pol.)
- Bukowski Ryszard. In: Elżbieta Dziębowska: Encyklopedia muzyczna PWM [PWM Edition's Music Encyclopaedia]. Vol. AB suplement [AB Supplement]. Kraków: Polskie Wydawnictwo Muzyczne, 1998, p. 85. ISBN 978-83-224-0492-8. OCLC 470131186. (Pol.)
- Ryszard Bukowski. Szkice do portretu [Sketches for a Portrait], eds Anna Granat-Janki et al., Wydawnictwo Akademii Muzycznej im. Karola Lipińskiego we Wrocławiu, Wrocław 2009.
- Hanek L. Wrocławscy kompozytorzy, muzykolodzy i publicyści [Wrocław Composers, Musicologists, and Music Journalists], Akademia Muzyczna we Wrocławiu, Wrocław 1985
- Hanuszewska M., Schaeffer B. Almanach polskich kompozytorów współczesnych [Anthology of Polish Contemporary Composers], PWM, Kraków 1982
- Pijarowska A., Ryszard Bukowski. Człowiek i Dzieło [The Artist and his Work], Wydawnictwo Akademii Muzycznej im. Karola Lipińskiego we Wrocławiu, Wrocław 2014
- Sołtanowicz J., Ryszard Bukowski – katalog twórczości [Ryszard Bukowski – Catalogue of Works], MMuz thesis supervised by Andrzej Tuchowski, PhD, Habil., Akademia Muzyczna im. Karola Lipińskiego we Wrocławiu, Wrocław 2000
