= Rafał Augustyn (composer) =

Polish composer, pianist and music critic (born 1951)

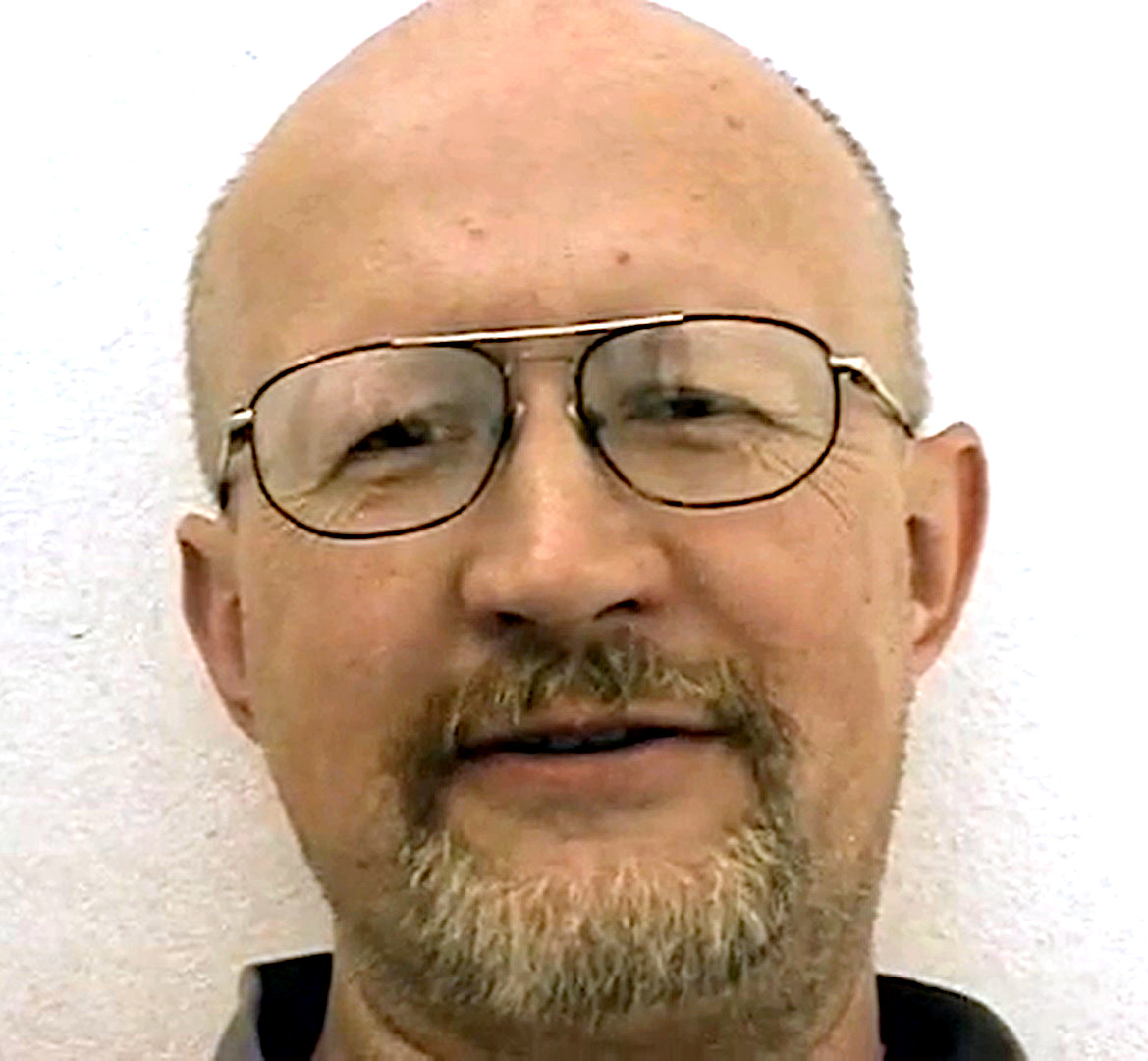
Augustyn (c. 2003) in music is (Speaking Portraits) (Vol. I)

Rafał Augustyn (born 28 August 1951) is a Polish composer of classical music, pianist, music critic, writer and scholar of Polish philology. As a composer, he has written symphonies, chamber orchestra works, vocal and electronic music, as well as music for theatre. Since the mid-1990s, Augustyn has collaborated with visual artists, architects and photographers on numerous multimedia artworks.

== Education and career ==
Augustyn was born on 28 August 1951 in Wrocław, Poland. He studied composition under Ryszard Bukowski at the State Higher School of Music in Wrocław between 1971 and 1974, and between 1975 and 1977 at the State Higher School of Music in Katowice, where he studied under Henryk Górecki. In 1979, Augustyn began to teach at the Institute of Polish Philology at Wrocław University and has remained there since. His works have had numerous performances at the Warsaw Autumn Festival, as well as at other Polish festivals, and across Europe, North America and the Far East. As a music writer and critic, he has written for such journals and periodicals as Ruch Muzyczny and Odra.

As a music critic, he has also published reviews in music and literary press and has appeared on Polish Radio and Television. In 1984–94, together with Marek Pijarowski, he was director of the "Musica Polonica Nova" Festival of Polish Contemporary Music in Wrocław. In 1980–98 he was a member of the Repertoire Committee of the "Warsaw Autumn" International Festival of Contemporary Music. He was co-founder of the "Brevis" Music Publishers.

== Style ==
Along with Andrzej Krzanowski and Eugeniusz Knapik, Augustyn is sometimes included as a member of the so-called "Silesian School"; that is, a group of composers who studied under Górecki in Katowice, Silesia, and are noted for their break with the current dominant postmodernist approach to classical music in Poland.

One of his major pieces, his "Symphony of Hymns", took 20 years to complete, typically lasts for 100 minutes and requires an orchestra of over 170 players. It was described in 2004 by the music critic Tim Rutherford-Johnson as,

"a monster of a work....[but] has that broad sweeping feel of neo-Romanticism that one might expect from a contemporary Polish symphonist, although it features none of Górecki’s direct simplicity or Penderecki’s gloomy ponderousness. It does however...continually blur the line between orchestration and form. Melody and harmony are present, but not discernible as such; more important is a lilting shifting of colours that tumbles the music forward."

== Selected works ==
- "Four Silesian Songs" for mixed choir" (1970–71)
- "Travel Pieces" for piano (1971–82)
- "String Quartet no. 1" (1973)
- "Monosonata for" piano (1976)
- "Three Calligrammes by Apollinaire" for soprano or mezzo-soprano and piano (1976)
- "Ballad" for strings (1977)
- "Klangfarbenmelodie" for percussion quartet (1979)
- "En blanc et noir" [1st version] for harpsichord (1979)
- "Romance" for trombone, double-bass, kettledrums and two pianos (1979)
- "Atlantis I" for large orchestra (1979)
- "Dedication" for soprano and string quartet (1979)
- "En blanc et noir" [2nd version] for harpsichord and chamber orchestra (1979–87)
- "Carmina de tempore" for soprano, piano and viola to words by early Polish poets (1981)
- "String Quartet no. 2" with flute ad libitum (1981)
- "A Life's Parallels" for high-pitched voice and orchestra (1983)
- "Atlantis II" for large orchestra and choir (1983)
- "Long Island Rail Road from Pennsylvania Station, N.Y.C. to Port Jefferson, Suffolk, L.I. (eastbound), Change at Huntington; or From Nathan Milstein to Paul Zukofsky", for solo violin, for Lasrom
- "Tychy" for violin and accompanying objects (1984)
- "Last Year in Elsinore", two sketches for trumpet and piano (1984)
- "Devil's Frolics", a ballet in one act after Adam Münchheimer and Stanisław Moniuszko (1984–85)
- "Sub Iove", nocturne for mixed choir (1986)
- "Cyclic Piece no. 1" for solo violin or violin ensemble (1986)
- "Three Roman Nocturnes" for mixed choir (1986–91)
- "Varesiana" for solo flute (1987)
- "Stela" [1st version] for solo violin (1987)
- "Variations on a Theme from Paganini" for piano (1987–89)
- "Stela" [2nd version] for string orchestra (1987–91)
- "A King for Seven Days", a pantomime (1988)
- "Auftakt" for orchestra (1989)
- "Cyclic Piece no. 2" for solo amplified double-bass (1990)
- "Five calligrammes by Apollinaire" for soprano and piano (1990)
- "Szczebrzeszyn", five tongue twisters for three-part children's choir (1991)
- "SPHAE.RA (Cyclic Piece no. 3)", music in 24 parts for tapes and soloists (1992)
- "Cantus puerorum, Sacra rappresentazione", a pantomime (1993)
- "A linea", 14 variations for cello and string orchestra (1994–95)
- "In partibus", colloquium for men's choir and piano (1995)
- "Grand jeté. Quartet No. 2 1/2 with Electronics" (1995–2005)
- "Cinque pezzi diversi" per violino e pianoforte (1996)
- "Toccata festival" for symphony orchestra (1997)
- "Per Sawa, short radio play for tape (1997)
- "Miroirs" for five performers (1997)
- "Do ut des" for string quartet (1998)
- "Mass" for soprano, alto, organ and choir (1998)
- "Osobne, 4 poems by Miron Białoszewski" for soprano, flute and harp (1999)
- "IMAGE/ILLUSION", a sound collection (audio-visual installation, prepared jointly with Jerzy Olek and Tadeusz Sawa-Borysławski) (1999)
- "Nie ma nic, a madrigal in many parts to the composer's own words" for mixed choir (2000)
- "Variations on a Theme by Maria Zduniak" for tape or computer (2000)
- "Au pair" for violin and piano (2001)
- "Itinerarium", concertino for orchestra and piano (2001)
- "Against Method" for violin solo (2004)
- "Od Sasa. Sounds-Pauses-Events" for mixed choir (2004–2005)
- "Shadow, Inc. A parable for four players after Hans Christian Andersen" for clarinet, violin, cello and piano (2005)
- "A-4. Travel Impression" for cello and piano (2005)
- "The Saragossa Manuscript", ballet in one act after Jan Potocki (2006–2007)

== Bibliography ==
- Adrian, Thomas. "Augustyn Rafał". In: The New Grove Dictionary of Music and Musicians. Second Edition, volume 2. London: Macmillan Publishers Limited, 2001.
- Bauman, Jolanta. "Charakterystyka sylwetki twórczej Rafała Augustyna (Rafał Augustyn’s artistic individuality)". In: Research conference on the topic of "The Work of Wrocław Composers (1945–1985)". Wrocław: Akademia Muzyczna we Wrocławiu, 1990.
- Zduniak, Maria. "Augustyn Rafał". In: Encyklopedia Muzyczna PWM. Kraków: PWM, 1998.
