= Desboulmiers =

French man of letters, historian of theatre and playwright

Jean-Auguste Jullien, called Desboulmiers, 1731, Paris – 1771, Paris, was an 18th-century French man of letters, historian of theatre and playwright.

== Works ==
- 1761: Les Soirées du Palais-Royal, ou les Veillées d'une jolie femme, contenant quatre Lettres à une amie, avec la conversation des chaises du Palais-Royal
- 1761: Honny soit qui mal y pense, ou Histoires des filles célèbres du XVIIIe, Read online
- 1770: Rose, ou les Effets de la haine, de l'amour et de l'amitié. Reprinted under the title L'Éducation de l'amour.
- 1766–1767: Mémoires du marquis de Solanges, 2 vol., Tome 2 online
- 1767: Pensées philosophiques, morales, critiques, littéraires et politiques de M. Hume.
- 1767: L'Esprit et la chose. Also attributed to Jean-Henri Marchand.
- 1768: De tout un peu, ou les Amusements de la campagne.
- 1769: Histoire anecdotique et raisonnée du Théâtre-Italien, depuis son rétablissement en France, jusqu'à l'année 1769, contenant les analyses des principales pièces et un catalogue de toutes celles tant italiennes que françaises données sur ce théâtre, avec les anecdotes les plus curieuses et les notices les plus intéressantes de la vie et des talents des auteurs, 6 vol. Reprint: Geneva, Slatkine.
- 1769: Histoire du théâtre de l'Opéra-Comique, 2 vol. Tome 2 online
- 1769: Le Bon fils, ou les Mémoires du comte de Samarandes, 2 vol.
- 1771: Trapue, reine des Topinamboux, ou la Maîtresse femme Read online

Théâtre

- 1763: Le Bon Seigneur, opéra comique in one act and in prose, music by Robert Desbrosses, Paris, Hôtel de Bourgogne, 19 February
- 1767: Toinon et Toinette, comedy in 2 acts in prose, mingled with ariettes, music by François-Joseph Gossec, Comédie Italienne, 20 June Read online
- 1777: Jemonville, ou les Époux malheureux, drama in 3 acts and in verse, theatre of Valenciennes, 10 February
- 1855: À la nuit close, comédie en vaudeville in 2 acts, with Marquet, Paris, Théâtre des Délassements-Comiques, 22 September

== Sources ==
- Nicolas-Toussaint Des Essarts, Les Siècles littéraires de la France, ou Nouveau dictionnaire, historique, critique, et bibliographique, de tous les écrivains français, morts et vivants, jusqu'à la fin du XVIIIe, Paris, chez l'auteur, vol. II, 1800, (p. 301–301)
- Pierre Larousse, Grand Dictionnaire biographique du XIXe, vol. VI, 1870, (p. 529)
