= Wojciech Bogusławski =

Polish actor, theater director and playwright

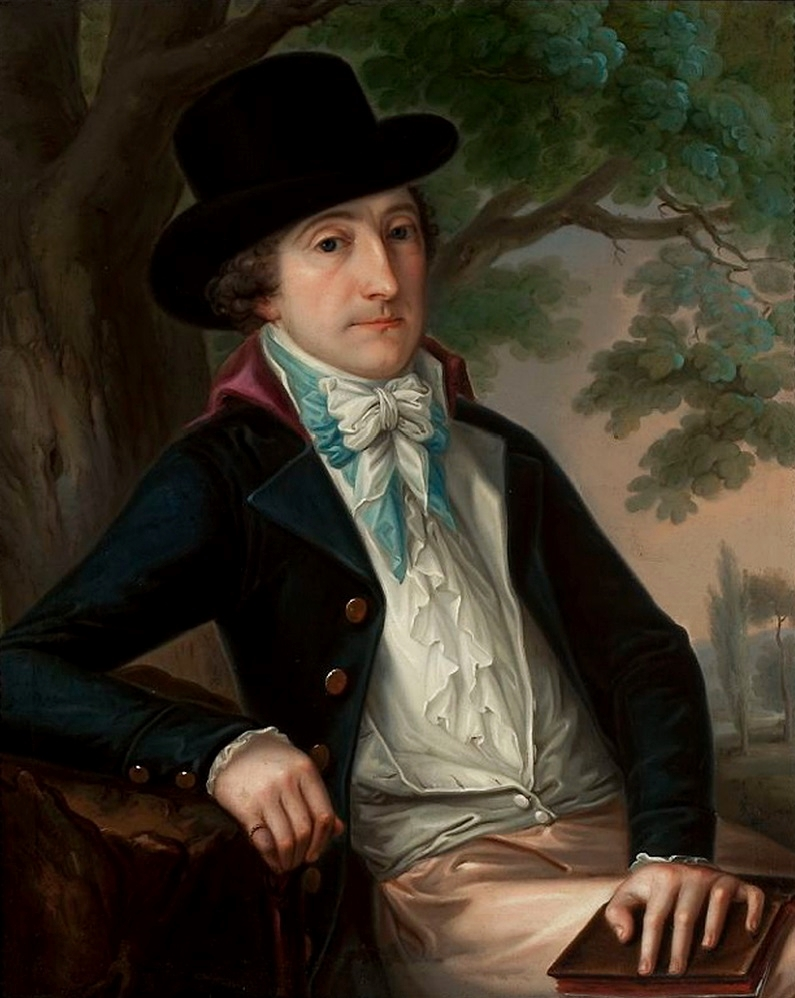
- Before 1829. Artist unknown.
- Born: 9 April 1757; Glinno, Poznań County
- Died: 23 July 1829 (aged 72); Warsaw, Poland
- Occupations: Actor, director, dramatist
- Known for: Father of Polish theatre

Wojciech Romuald Bogusławski (9 April 1757 – 23 July 1829) was a Polish actor, theater director and playwright of the Polish Enlightenment. He was the director of the National Theatre, Warsaw, (Teatr Narodowy), during three distinct periods, as well as establishing a Polish opera. He is considered the "Father of Polish theatre."

== Early life ==
Bogusławski was born into the minor nobility in Glinno, Poznań County, the son of land regent Leopold Bogusławski and Anna Teresa Linowski (see Pomian coat of arms. It is likely that he initially studied in Kraków before going on to attend a Piarist boarding school in Warsaw. In 1774 he traveled to the court of Bishop Kajetan Sołtyk, where he took part in the amateur theatre performances organized there. In 1775 he enlisted with the Lithuanian Footmen's Guard, and left the military three years later with the rank of officer cadet.

== Career ==
=== 1778-1790 ===
Bogusławski embarked on his theatre career in 1778 by joining the troupe of Ludwik Montbrum, where he made his stage debut, and where his two-act, opera adaptation of Franciszek Bohomolec's cantata Nędza uszczęśliwiona (Misery Made Happy) was very well received.

In 1781 he began performing in Lviv with Agnieszka and Tomasz Truskolaski's troupe, but quickly returned to Warsaw. He was hired by the Polish National Theatre in 1782 and became its director a year later (1782–84), proving to be an enterprising impresario by organizing tours to cities like Grodno and Dubno. During this period he also established his own theatre in Poznań with the support of Stanisław August Poniatowski, but the venture quickly collapsed. He became a Freemason.

In 1785 Bogusławski founded another theatre in Vilnius, which he managed for the next five years. Among the plays he staged were Franciszek Zabłocki's Fircyk w zalotach (The Dandy's Courtship) (1785), and in 1786 gave the Polish premiere of Pierre Beaumarchais's scandalously revolutionary play The Marriage of Figaro. In Vilnius he assembled a troupe of accomplished actors whom he took with him when he returned to Warsaw, where he resumed directorship of the National Theatre.

=== 1790-1794 ===
His second term as director of this institution, lasting from 1790 to the fall of the Kościuszko Uprising in 1794, consisted of building a real national stage with an artistic, social and civic mission. Boguslawski saw theatre primarily as a force for good, treating it as a platform for disseminating nationalist ideals: during the turbulent Great Sejm, 1788–92, state reforms were the subject of many productions at the National Theatre. A supporter of the reformist camp, Bogusławski created a repertoire addressing matters he saw as most important to Poles. During this period he also wrote for the theatre. After staging Julian Ursyn Niemcewicz's Powrót posla (The Return of the Deputy) (1791), Poland's first-ever political comedy, he wrote and staged a sequel to this drama titled Dowód wdzięczności narodu (Proof of the Nation's Appreciation) (1791) and followed this with Józef Wybicki's Szlachcic Mieszczaninem (The Noble Bourgeois) (1791).

He also wrote and staged Henryk vi na Lowach (Henry VI on a Hunting Excursion) (1792) and his most famous work, Cud mniemany, Czyli krakowiacy i górale (The Presumed Miracle, or Krakovians and Highlanders) (1794), Poland's first-ever opera, which he set to music by Stefani. Premiering on the eve of the Kościuszko Uprising, the production was banned by censors after just three performances. However, the public immediately understood the political allusions and soon people in Warsaw's streets were singing passages from “Krakovians”.

"The faces of vile traitors like Szczęsny Potocki, Kossakowski, Ożarowski, Zabiełło, Ankwicz and their henchmen exuded falseness (...)," wrote Antoni Trebicki of the production at the National. "What could be more comedic and better embody the preposterousness of all those imposed rulers of our kingdom as their collectively issued permission to play the farce 'Krakovians,' which happened to be written when it was, encouraged insurrection and publicly announced to those gentlemen what would actually happen to them imminently."

Bogusławski was due to be arrested for staging “The Presumed Miracle/Krakovians and Highlanders,” but apparently escaped through the intervention of the Royal Marshall Moszynski.

=== 1794-1799 ===
Following the uprising's collapse Bogusławski left Warsaw for Lviv, taking a substantial part of the theatre's costumes, props and the theatre's library with him. In Lviv he started another Polish theatre which operated under his guidance until 1799. Following extended negotiations with local censors he once again staged “Krakovians and Highlanders” in 1796, following this with a production of Shakespeare's Hamlet in 1797. In 1797 he also mounted an interesting production of his own melodrama titled Iskahar, Król Guaxary (Iskahar, King of Guaxara).

"Bogusławski Polonized 'Hamlet' and other dramas because the theatre of the Enlightenment, following a practice as old as the world, adapted works by the world's great geniuses to its own tastes. The works were Polonized because it was believed that viewers would not be stunned by the strangeness and exoticism of foreign customs only if they saw themselves as if in a mirror on stage."

Bogusławski introduced Classical tragedies to the Polish stage and did the same for Shakespeare, mounting productions based on translations and adaptations of the Bard's works. He also wrote several original plays and translated, adapted, modified and adjusted to Polish realities many French, German, English and Italian plays. All told, he authored more than eighty tragedies, comedies, dramas and opera librettos.

Bogusławski was a proponent of classical French principles initially, but later shifted his focus to moralizing German dramas that he saw as being closer to life. He directed the plays of Jean Racine, Molière, Voltaire, Pierre Beaumarchais, Denis Diderot, Friedrich Schiller and Gotthold Ephraim Lessing. His interests not being limited to an ambitious repertoire, he also staged melodramas and vaudevilles that drew sizeable audiences as well as operas and ballets.

Bogusławski would almost immediately establish a Polish stage wherever he traveled, and these new theatres would continue to function as independent institutions after his departure.

"To erect a theatre wherever it was possible to perform in Polish and to perform in Polish as far as this was possible, and in performing what was necessary and when it was necessary, to proclaim and always remember that one had emerged from Warsaw and to Warsaw one would return" – this was his creative and organizational credo.

Actors who emerged from his "school" also founded new theatres. He taught his collaborators gesture and diction while constantly promoting greater naturalness in acting. Bogusławski helped many actors to develop their talents, his protégés including Kazimierz Owsinski, Alojzy Żółkowski, Agnieszka and Tomasz Truskolaski, Franciszka Pierożyńska, Bonawentura Kudlicz, Józefa Ledóchowska, Ludwik Dmuszewski and many others.

As an actor, he began by playing leading men, but his greatest acting triumphs came later, during his second term as director of the National Theatre, playing Old Dominic in "Taczka Occiarza" (1793 – his own adaptation of Sebastian Mercier's play "La Brouette de Vinagrier"), Ferdinand Kokiel in "Henry VI on a Hunting Excursion" and Bardos in "Krakovians and Highlanders". Though all these roles were common folk, Boguslawski was equally convincing as elderly characters, rulers or tyrants, and he played King Lear in Shakespeare's tragedy (1805), King Axur in Axur, a drama set to music by Antonio Salieri (1793), and Old Horace in Pierre Corneille's Horace (1793).

As a stage director, Bogusławski was adept at working with designers and musicians. He cooperated frequently with painters Antoni Smuglewicz, Jan Bogumił Plersch, Innocento Maraino and Antonio Scottio, and with exceptional musicians like Frederic Chopin’s teacher Józef Elsner and Karol Kurpiński. His most interesting productions were those where he shaped multiple aspects – as writer and director, and often appearing in the leading role.

=== 1799-1814 ===
In 1799 Boguslawski returned to Warsaw and became director of the National Theatre for the third time, retaining this position until 1814. During this period he also performed in a number of other Polish cities, including Poznań, Kalisz, Łowicz, Kraków and Gdańsk. He remained a favorite of vast segments of the audience, although critics increasingly accused him of manifesting "vulgar tastes".

In 1811 he organized Poland's first School of Drama, simultaneously writing a textbook titled Dramaturgia, czyli nauka sztuki scenicznej dla Szkoły Teatralnej napisana przez Wojciecha Bogusławskiego w Warszawie 1812 (Dramaturgy, or an Instructional Stage Art Program for a Theatre School Written by Wojciech Bogusławski in Warsaw in 1812).

In 1814 he handed over his National Theatre "enterprise" to Ludwik Osiński, but remained linked to the theatre. Initially, he performed with his own troupe at the National Theatre, but later also appeared on other stages, including that in Vilnius. Toward the end of his life he wrote and published his Dzieje Teatru Narodowego (Annals of The National Theatre), and also compiled and printed his Dzieła Dramatyczne (Dramatic Works). Wojciech Bogusławski made his last stage appearance in 1827.

== Death ==
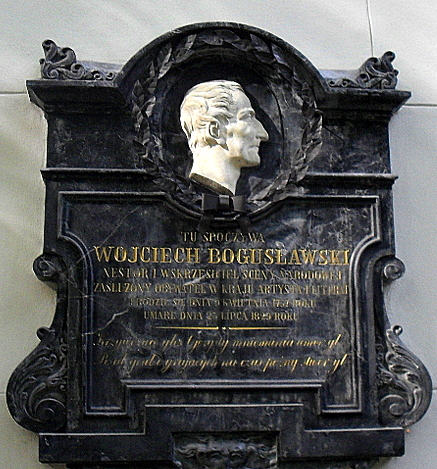
Powązki Cemetery

He died on 23 July 1829, age 72, in Warsaw.

== Afterlife ==
- He was commemorated on a Polish postage stamp issued as part of a set depicting dramatists in 1978.
- He is the protagonist of the novel "Az Ikszek" (1981) by renowned Hungarian writer György Spiró.

== See also ==
- List of Poles
