= Franciszek Bohomolec =

Polish teacher, writer and satirist (1720–1784)

Reverend Franciszek Bohomolec SJ
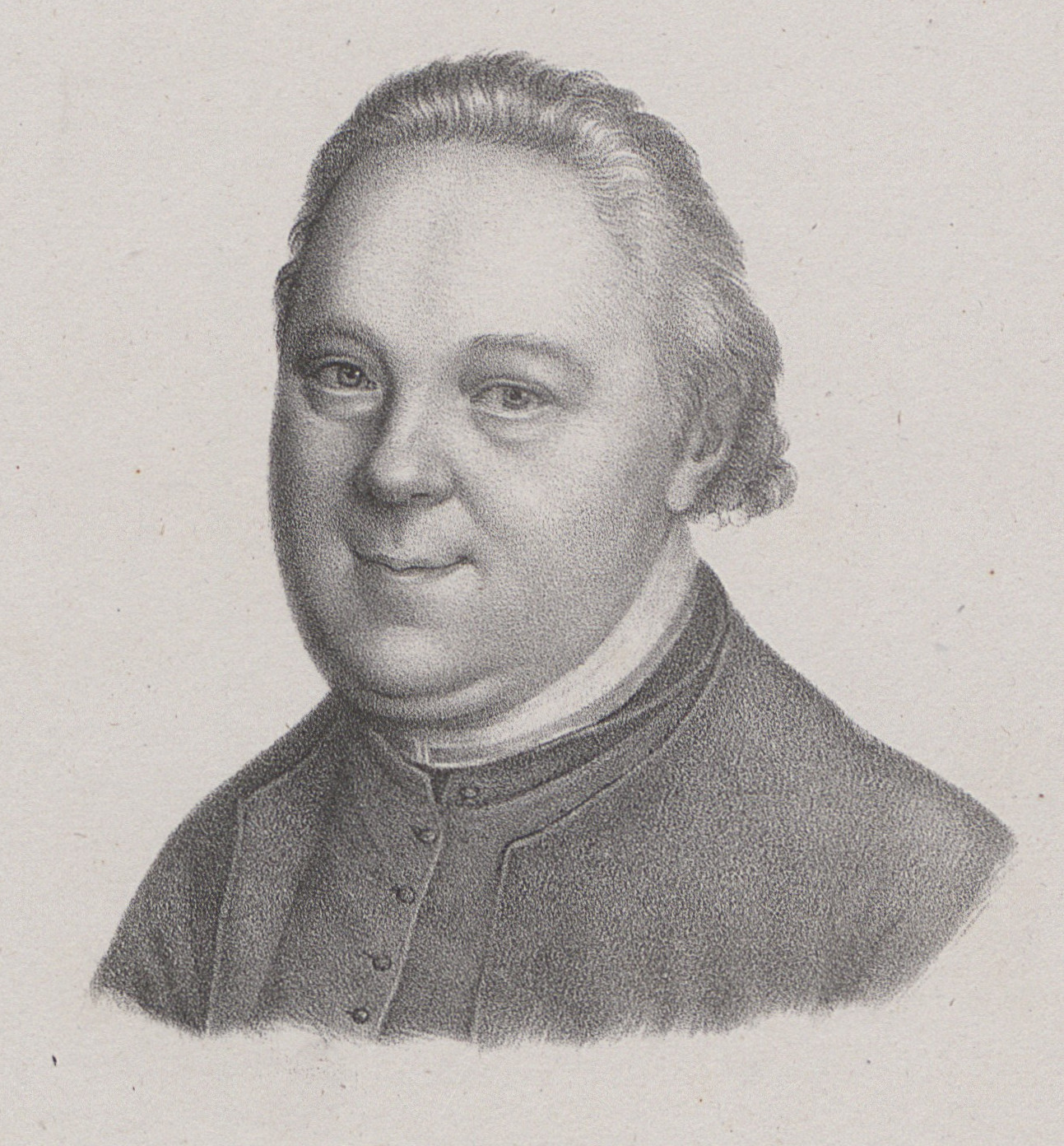
- Franciszek Bohomolec, print by Karl Minter after a portrait by Ludwik Marteau, 1826
- Other posts: teacher, editor, dramatist

Orders
- Ordination: 1747

Personal details
- Born: Franciszek Bohomolec; 29 January 1720 Vitebsk, Republic of the Two Nations
- Died: 24 April 1784 (aged 64) Warsaw, Poland
- Buried: Powązki Cemetery
- Denomination: Roman Catholic
- Residence: Warsaw
- Parents: Paweł Bohomolec, Franciszka Cedrowska
- Occupation: teacher, writer, social satirist, philanthropist
- Profession: Jesuit priest
- Education: Wilnius Academy, Gregorian University, Rome
- Coat of arms: Bogoria

Franciszek Bohomolec, S.J., (29 January 1720 – 24 April 1784) was a Polish Jesuit teacher, writer, poet, satirist, social commentator, linguist, translator, dramatist and theatrical reformer. He was one of the principal playwrights of the Polish Enlightenment. After the Suppression of the Society of Jesus, he continued his usual work and in addition became an editor, publisher and printer., At various times, he wrote under one of numerous pseudonyms: Daniel Bobinson, Dzisiejkiewicz, Galantecki, Jeden Zakonnik S. J., Jeden Zakonnik Societatis Jesu, Lubożoński, Ludziolubski, Murmiłowski, Ochotnicki, Odziański, Pokutnicki, Pośrzednicki, Poznajewski, Prożniak nie Tęskniący, Staroświat, Śmiałecki, Szkolnicki, Theosebes, and Ucziwski, as well as the acronyms: F. B., F. B. S. J., J. U. P. Z., M. Z. S. W., and N. N.. His family carried the Bogoria coat of arms

After completing his studies for the Jesuit priesthood and ordination in Vilnius, he spent two years studying rhetoric in Rome. Bohomolec returned to Warsaw to teach. As well as teaching poetry, he began to adapt the comedies of Carlo Goldoni and Molière for performance by his pupils. His early works satirized the ignorance and folly of the Polish aristocracy. His later plays reached a wider public. They included Małżeństwo z kalendarza ("Marriage by the Calendar", 1766), which ridicules ignorance and superstition and is usually considered his best work, and Czary ("Sorcery", 1775), which also satirises superstition. Pan dobry ("The Good Landowner", 1967) is a social commentary on the relationship between peasants and the gentry. Bohomolec was an habitué of King Stanisław August Poniatowski's weekly Thursday Lunches.

For the last 20 years of his life Bohomolec edited the magazine Monitor, which greatly contributed to the Enlightenment in Poland. It was modelled on the famed English magazines The Tatler and The Spectator and was one of the first modern periodicals in Poland. His works in Latin include a study of Polish vernacular language. A famous anonymous poem of his time, entitled, "Kurdesz", (taken from the Turkish word for 'brother') and addressed to the mayor of Warsaw, is most often attributed to him.
