= Nazi war crimes at Theatre Square in Warsaw =

War crimes during World War 2

- Location: 52°14′38.69″N 21°00′31.33″E; Warsaw, Poland (occupied by Third Reich – General Government)
- Date: 7–10 August 1944
- Attack type: Mass executions
- Perpetrator: Third Reich (SS)

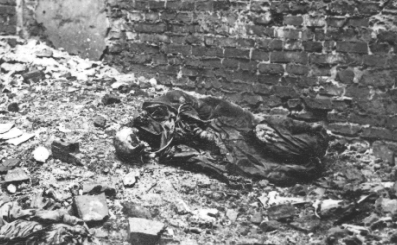
Body of one of the victims of the mass executions carried out in the ruins of the National Opera

Nazi war crimes at Theatre Square in Warsaw were mass executions of residents of North Downtown carried out by SS units during the Warsaw Uprising of 1944.

Between 7 and 10 August 1944, the Germans expelled the Polish population living in the vicinity of Theatre Square. The expulsions were accompanied by mass executions, arson, looting, and rape of women. Several hundred Poles (mostly men) were shot in the ruins of the National Opera and in the nearby streets. There were also many cases of Polish civilians being used as "human shields" to cover the advances of German infantry and tanks.

== Beginning of fighting in the area of Theatre Square ==
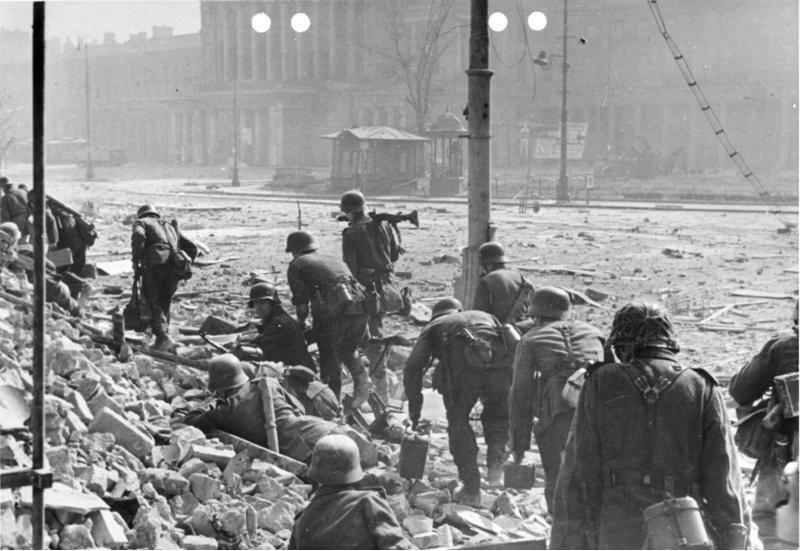
German soldiers in the vicinity of Theatre Square

On the evening of 6 August 1944, the leading units of Reinefarth Combat Group broke through Wola and reached the Saxon Garden. The German command thus achieved its first objective, which was to unblock the so-called government district in the area of Piłsudski Square and to free Governor Ludwig Fischer and General Reiner Stahel (who had been cut off by the insurgents in the Brühl Palace and Saxon Palace). Heinz Reinefarth's troops then began an assault on the insurgent positions in the City Hall building and Blank Palace, which was to be a prelude to a general assault on Warsaw's Old Town.

== Executions in the ruins of the National Opera ==
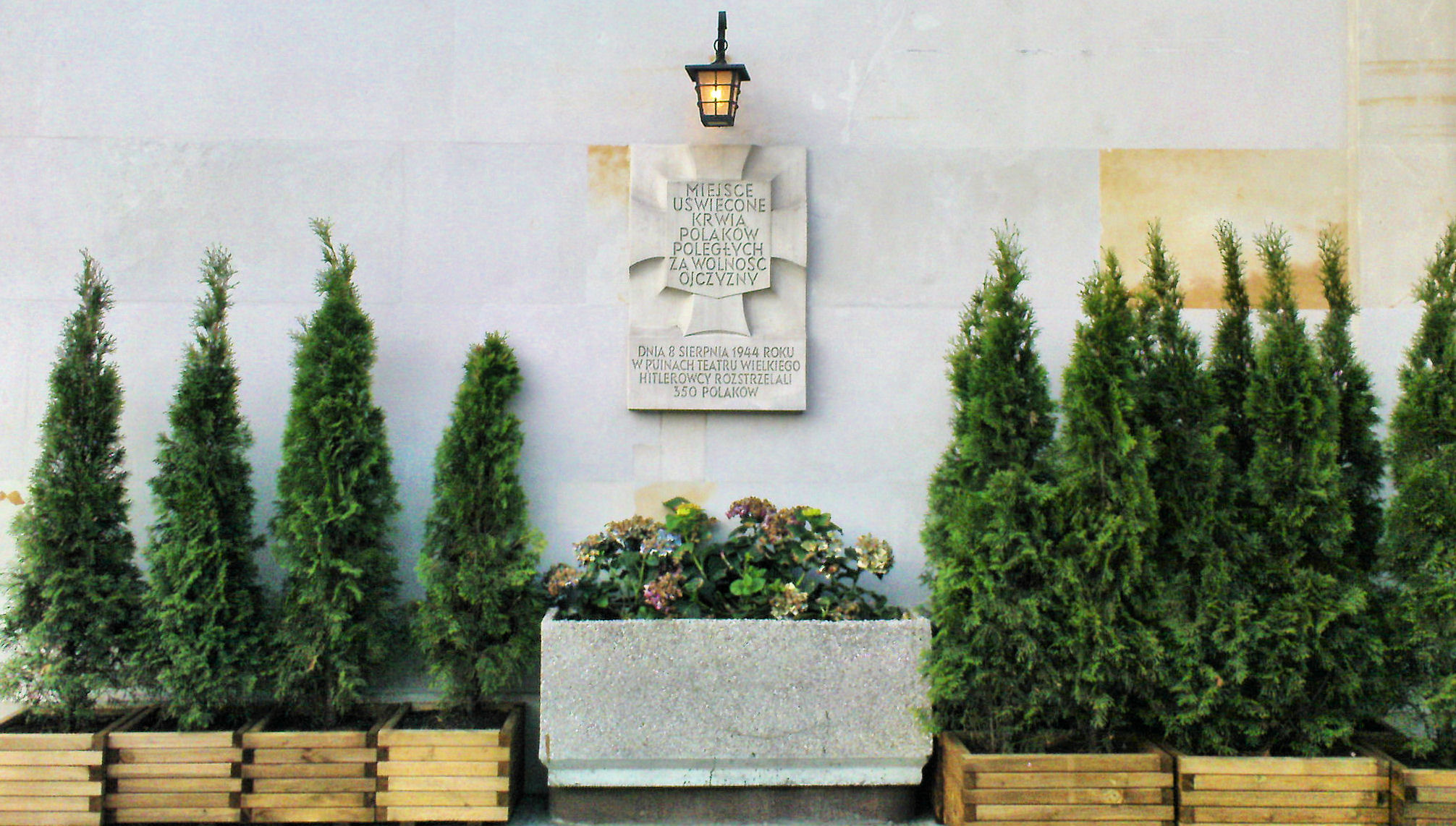
Plaque commemorating the victims of the executions in the ruins of the National Opera

On 7 August, two battalions of the SS-Sonderregiment Dirlewanger were deployed to the vicinity of Theatre Square. German criminals served in the ranks of this unit, who were promised a pardon in exchange for fighting for the Third Reich. The Dirlewanger soldiers immediately began expelling the Polish population living near Theatre Square. Houses on Albert, Foch, Aleksander Fredro, Krakowskie Przedmieście, Senatorska, Trębacka, and Wierzbowa streets were systematically set on fire. Residents were given a few minutes to leave the building, and the sick and infirm were usually killed on the spot. Civilians who were able to walk were herded to Piłsudski Square or the Saxon Garden, where marching columns were formed. Then, amid harassment, beatings, rape, and looting, the population was herded to a gathering point at the Church of St. Adalbert in Wola, and from there, transported via Warszawa Zachodnia station to a transit camp in Pruszków. Some of the exiles (both men and women) were detained to be used as "human shields" or laborers in the construction of fortifications and the dismantling of insurgent barricades.

Dirlewanger's men also herded hundreds of civilians into the ruins of the National Opera (partially burned down as a result of German air raids in September 1939). Many residents of nearby houses had already taken refuge there, hiding in the air-raid shelter in the basement of the building before the Germans arrived. Once there, the SS separated the men from the women and children. The latter were placed in the basement of the building, where they were held for several days in appalling sanitary conditions. Many young women and girls were raped at that time. Many others were used as hostages and died during German assaults on insurgent positions. Finally, around 10 August, the women and children in the building were driven to Wola, and from there to the camp in Pruszków.

Around 350 Polish men were shot by the Germans in the ruins of the opera (8–9 August 1944). Witnesses who survived the executions testified that the victims were led to boxes on the upper floors, where they were shot in the back of the head and their bodies were thrown onto the stage or into the auditorium. The bodies of the murdered were later burned by members of the Verbrennungskommando Warschau. After the war, it was possible to establish the names of only 33 victims of the massacre.

== Human shields ==
There were numerous incidents in which Polish civilians captured near Theatre Square were used as "human shields" to cover German attacks on the insurgents' barricades. On 8 August 1944, SS men from the Dirlewanger Brigade launched an assault on Polish positions in the City Hall building and the vicinity of Bielańska Street, using several hundred Polish civilians brought out from the National Opera basement – mostly elderly people, women, and children – as cover. The German attack collapsed under the flanking fire of the insurgents, and most of the hostages managed to take refuge in the area controlled by the insurgents with the help of Home Army soldiers. However, many civilians were killed in the crossfire. On that day, the Germans repeated their attacks several times, using groups of about 10–30 civilians, who were herded into the middle of the square and placed in front of tanks as human shields. Witnesses recalled that the hostages knelt on the cobblestones, singing Boże, coś Polskę. Despite the Germans' use of tactics contrary to the international humanitarian law, all assaults were repelled with heavy losses for the attackers. Many hostages were also killed. Attacks using "human shields" were also carried out by the Germans in other sections.

Polish civilians were also forced to perform physical labor on the front lines (carrying the wounded, building fortifications, etc.) and even to shield German riflemen with their own bodies. Witnesses testified that on one occasion, the Germans formed a human chain of about 50 men (bound together by wire at the wrists), from which they fired at insurgent positions on Żabia Street.

== Massacres on Kozia and Senatorska streets ==
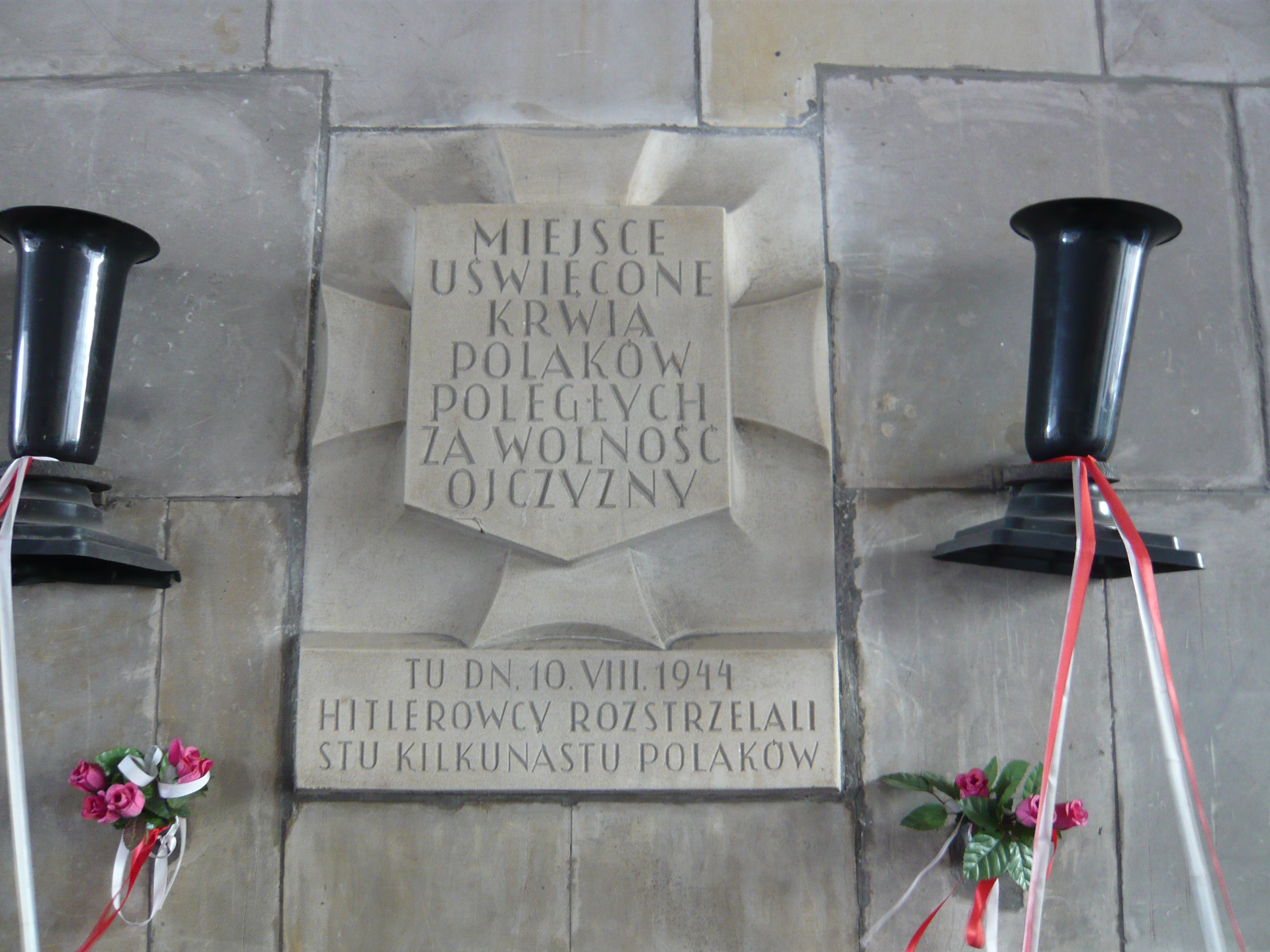
Commemorative plaque on Kozia Street

During those days, the ruins of the opera were not the only place where Polish civilians were massacred. On the afternoon of 7 August, Dirlewanger's troops entered the Malta Hospital on Senatorska Street. Shortly after taking control of the building, the Germans murdered several people. They then ordered the immediate evacuation of the hospital and set fire to one of the pavilions. However, the intervention of German patients staying at the hospital prevented the massacre, and after some time, Dirlewanger's men withdrew back to the Saxon Garden.

At the same time, the Germans also entered the nearby Church of St. Anthony of Padua, where crowds of Polish civilians were seeking refuge. The parson, Father Stanisław Trzeciak, showed the soldiers a high German decoration (awarded to him before the war by the Third Reich government) and convinced them to leave the people alone. However, on 8 August, the SS returned to complete the displacement of the residents of Senatorska Street. The refugees gathered in the church were driven to Wola, and from there to the camp in Pruszków. During the march, near the Luxenburg Gallery, among other places, the German escort murdered at least 10 people. One of the victims was Father Trzeciak, shot by a private soldier. Between 8 and 10 August, at least three mass executions took place on the church grounds, in which the Germans murdered about 110 people. The "evacuation" of the Malta Hospital was finally carried out on 14 August. In executions on 7 and 14 August, Dirlewanger men murdered approximately 30 people there.

On 10 August, the Germans gathered between 100 and 300 Polish men and boys in the courtyard of the Hotel de Saxe on Kozia Street. (Note: They were mostly residents of houses at 3 and 5 Kozia Street and at 1, 6, 8, and 10 Foch Street (Motyl & Rutkowski (1994, p. 74)).) They were then led into the building in groups of ten and shot in the hallways or on the upper floors. After the executions, the soldiers finished off any victims who were still showing signs of life, and then set fire to the hotel. After the war, the names of 40 of the murdered victims were identified.

In addition, at the end of the first decade of August 1944, a series of smaller executions took place in the area of Theatre Square. During the displacement of the residents of Albert Street (now Niecała Street), German soldiers murdered about 25 people. The largest execution took place on 8 August at house no. 8, where about 20 residents were shot. Eight Polish men, identified by name, were shot on 10 or 11 August in front of the house at 66 Krakowskie Przedmieście Street. At least several people were murdered near Trębacka Street. Many executions also took place in the Saxon Garden. Among others, on 8 August, almost 30 residents of the youth detention center of the Michaelites in Struga (Note: The boys and their teachers arrived in Warsaw on an evacuation transport at the beginning of August 1944. Until 8 August, they stayed at the seminary at 52 Krakowskie Przedmieście Street (Motyl & Rutkowski (1994, p. 111)).) – residents of the institution and 3–4 priests who were their educators – were shot there.

== Commemoration ==
The victims of executions carried out by the Germans in the area of Theatre Square in August 1944 are commemorated by seven sandstone plaques designed by Karol Tchorek. One of them was embedded in the wall of the Grand Theater. The others commemorate the execution sites at 66 Krakowskie Przedmieście, 3/5 Kozia Street, 8 Niecała Street, and 29/31, 33, and 38 Senatorska Street.

== Bibliography ==
- Borkiewicz, Adam (1969). Powstanie warszawskie. Zarys działań natury wojskowej [The Warsaw Uprising: An Outline of Military Operations] (in Polish). Warsaw: Pax.
- Datner, Szymon; Leszczyński, Kazimierz (1962). Zbrodnie okupanta w czasie powstania warszawskiego w 1944 roku (w dokumentach) [Crimes of the Occupier during the Warsaw Uprising of 1944 (in Documents)] (in Polish). Warsaw: MON Publishing House.
- Motyl, Maja; Rutkowski, Stanisław (1994). Powstanie Warszawskie – rejestr miejsc i faktów zbrodni [The Warsaw Uprising: A Register of Sites and Facts of Crimes] (in Polish). Warsaw: Chief Commission for the Prosecution of Crimes against the Polish Nation.
- Przygoński, Antoni (1980). Powstanie warszawskie w sierpniu 1944 r. [The Warsaw Uprising in August 1944] (in Polish). Vol. I. Warsaw: Polish Scientific Publishers PWN. ISBN 83-01-00293-X.
- Serwański, Edward; Trawińska, Irena (1946). Zbrodnia niemiecka w Warszawie 1944 r. [The German Crime in Warsaw, 1944] (in Polish). Poznań: Publishing House of the Western Institute.
