= Statue of Wojciech Bogusławski =

Monument in Warsaw, Poland

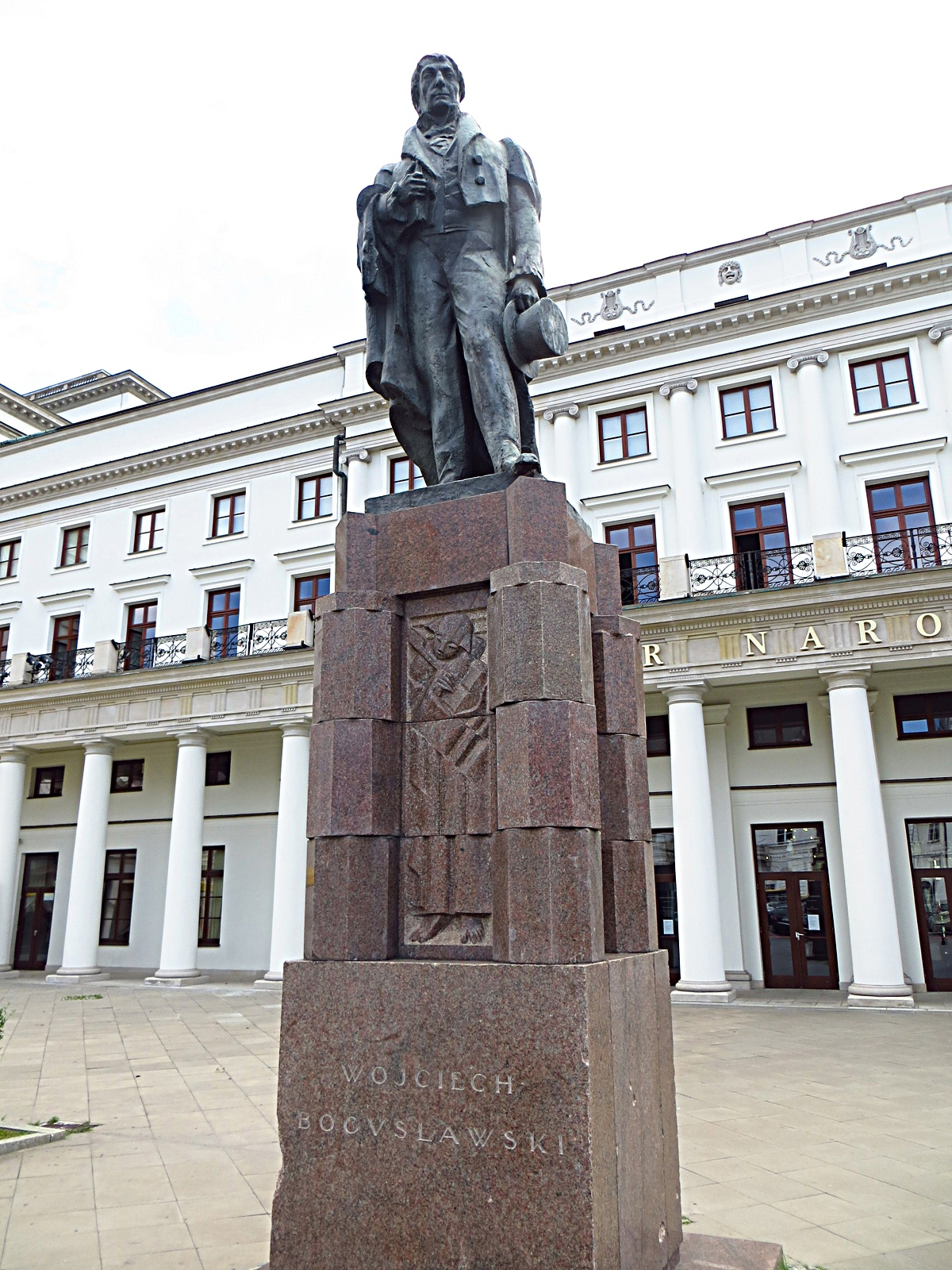
- The statue in 2016.
- Interactive map of Statue of Wojciech Bogusławski
- Location: 1 Theatre Square, Downtown, Warsaw, Poland
- Coordinates: 52.243654°N 21.009414°E
- Type: Statue
- Material: Bronze (statue); granite (pedestal)
- Height: 5 m (total); 2 m (statue)
- Opening date: 27 September 1936
- Restored date: 17 January 1965
- Dedicated to: Władysław Bartoszewski
- Dismantled date: 1944

The statue of Wojciech Bogusławski (Polish pronunciation: [ˈvɔj.t͡ɕɛx bɔ.ɡuˈswaf.skʲi]; Polish: Pomnik Wojciecha Bogusławskiego) is a monument in Warsaw, Poland, within the Downtown district. It is placed in front of the right wing of the Grand Theatre building at 1 Theatre Square within the neighbourhood of North Downtown. It is dedicated to Wojciech Bogusławski (1757–1829), an 18th- and 19th-century actor, theater director, and playwright of the Polish Enlightenment, who was the director of the National Theatre in Warsaw, and is considered the founder of the Polish opera. The monument consits of a 2-metre-tall bronze statue, placed on a 3-metre-tall Art Deco granite pedestal. It was designed by Jan Szczepkowski, and unveiled on 27 September 1936. It was destroyed in 1944, in the Warsaw Uprising during the Second World War. Its reconstruction was unveiled on 17 January 1965.

== History ==
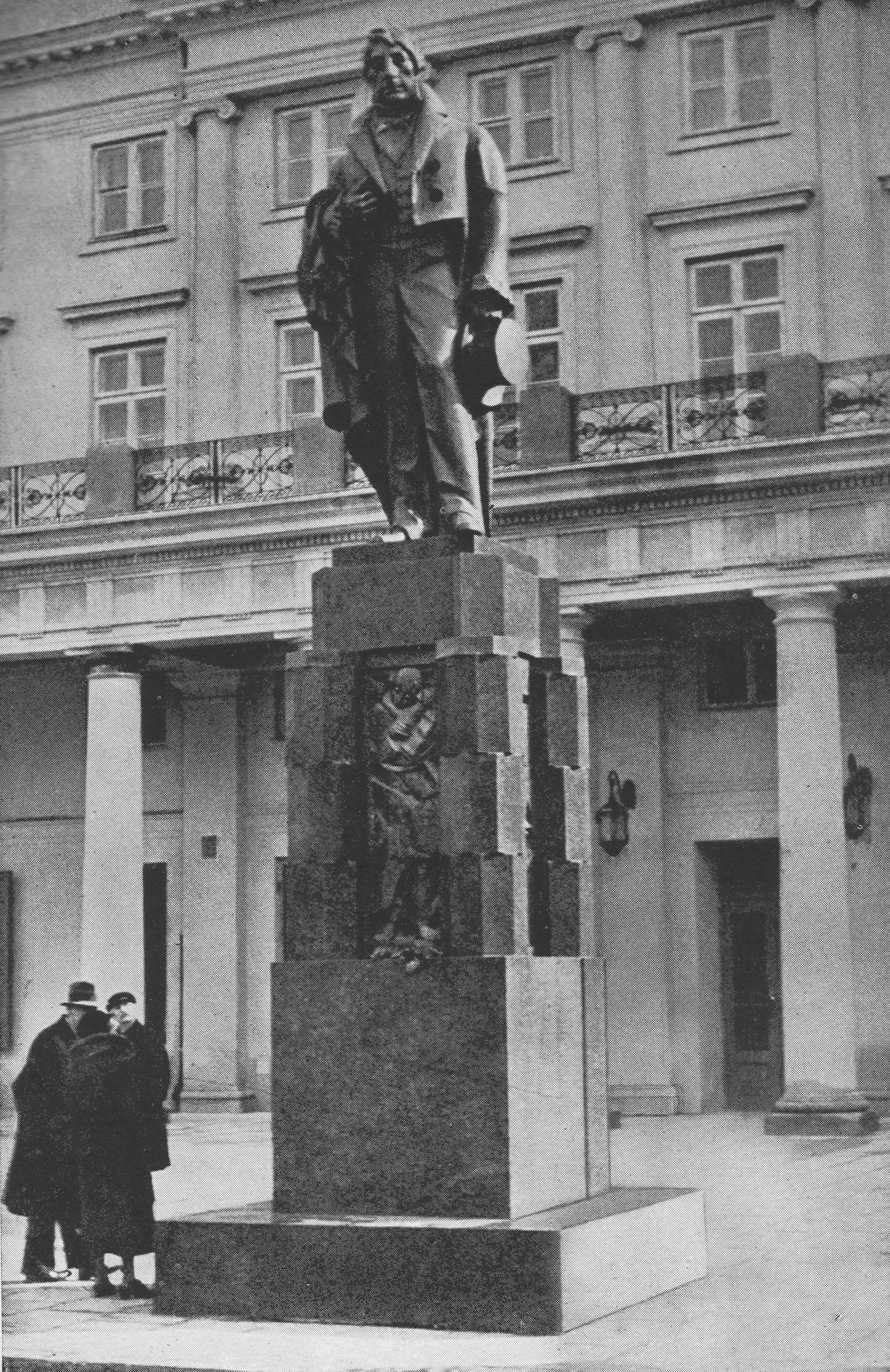
The original statue in the 1930s.

The monument was dedicated to Wojciech Bogusławski (1757–1829), an 18th- and 19th-century actor, theater director, and playwright of the Polish Enlightenment, who was the director of the National Theatre in Warsaw, and is considered the founder of the Polish opera. It was commissioned in 1929, and financed by the Association of Polish Stage Artists, and designed by sculptor Jan Szczepkowski in the Art Deco style. The statue was unveiled on 27 September 1936 by mayor Stefan Starzyński, in front of the Grand Theatre building, which houses the National Theatre. The monument was destroyed in 1944 in an explosion by German officers, following the fall of the Warsaw Uprising during the Second World War. Several fragments of its pedestal survived, while destroyed remains of the bronze statue were discovered in 1945 in the Lilpop's Factory in the Wola district.

Jan Szczepkowski reconstructed the monument in 1964, with founding from the Social Fund for the Reconstruction of the Capital. It was unveiled at its original location on 17 January 1965, during the celebrations of the 20th anniversary of the Red Army of the Soviet Union entering the city during the Second World War. On the same day, a statue of Stanisław Moniuszko, also designed by Szczepkowski, was unveield nearby, next to the left wing of the Grand Theatre.

== Characteristics ==
The monument consists of a 2-metre-tall bronze statue of Wojciech Bogusławski, wearing a suit, with a coat rested on his right forearm, and a top hat held in his left hand, near his leg. It is placed on top of a 3-metere-top Art Deco pedestal, decorative slabs with reliefs, and geometric elements made of pink granite from Finland. It is placed in front of right wing the Grand Theatre building at 1 Theatre Square. The statue of Stanisław Moniuszko, is placed on the other side of the building, in front of its left wing.
