= Time in Poland =

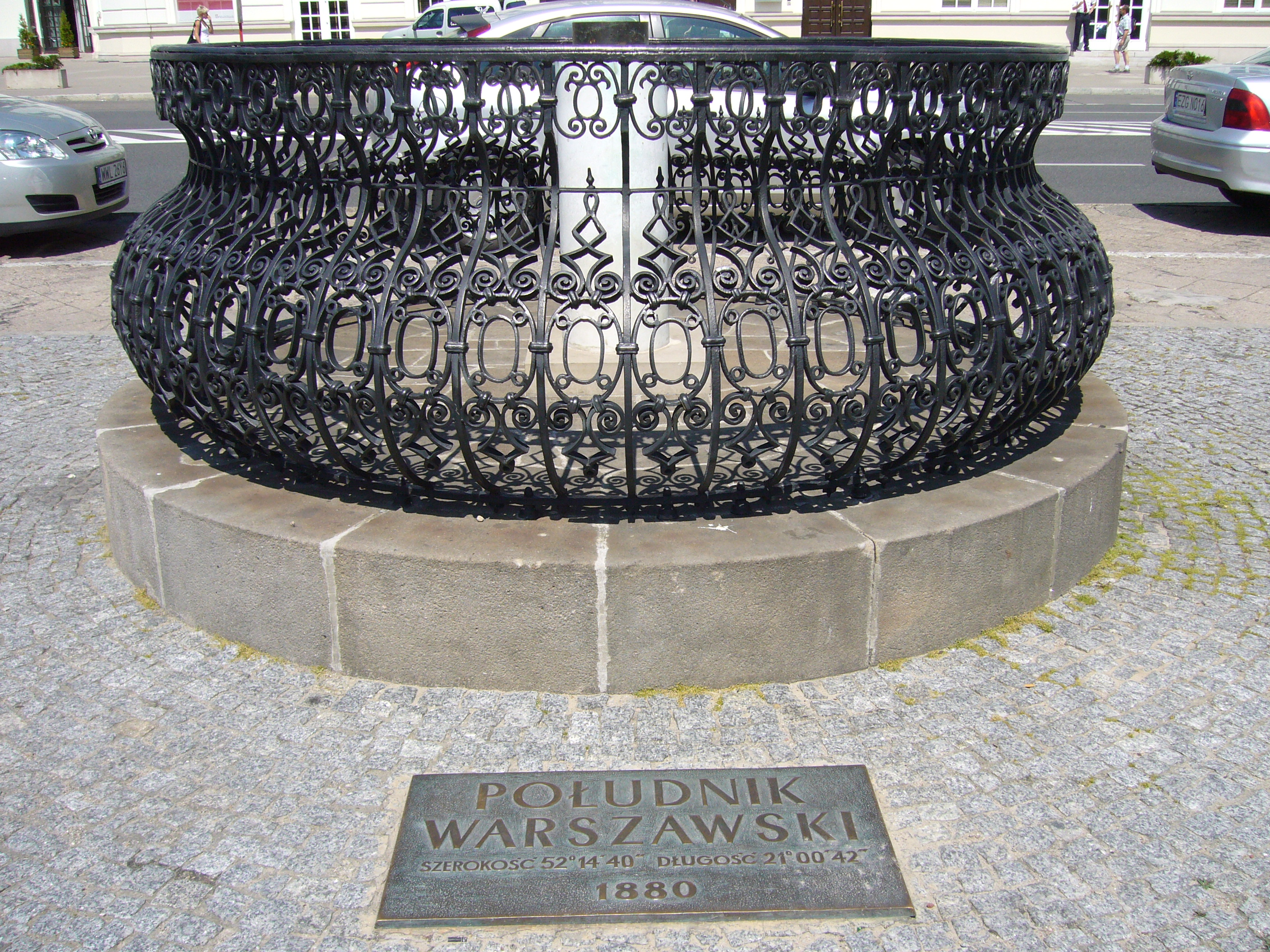
- Warsaw meridian
- Time zone: Central European Time
- Initials: CET
- UTC offset: UTC+01:00
- Standard meridian: 52nd parallel north (Warsaw meridian; UTC+01:24)
- Time notation: 12-hour clock and 24-hour clock
- Adopted: 5 August 1915 (Warsaw); 31 May 1922

Daylight saving time
- Name: Central European Summer Time
- Initials: CEST
- UTC offset: UTC+02:00
- Start: Last Sunday in March (02:00 CET)
- End: Last Sunday in October (03:00 CEST)
- In use since: 1977

tz database
- Europe/Warsaw

Time in Europe: Light Blue / Western European Time / Greenwich Mean Time (UTC); Blue / Western European Time / Greenwich Mean Time (UTC); Blue / Western European Summer Time / British Summer Time / Irish Standard Time (UTC+1); Red / Central European Time (UTC+1); Red / Central European Summer Time (UTC+2); Yellow / Eastern European Time / Kaliningrad Time (UTC+2); Ochre / Eastern European Time (UTC+2); Ochre / Eastern European Summer Time (UTC+3); Green / Moscow Time / Turkey Time (UTC+3); Turquoise / Armenia Time / Azerbaijan Time / Georgia Time / Samara Time (UTC+4); ▉▉▉▉ Pale hues: Standard time observed all year ▉▉▉ Dark hues: Daylight saving time

Time in Poland is given by Central European Time (Polish: Czas środkowoeuropejski; CET; UTC+01:00). Daylight saving time, which moves an hour ahead, is observed from the last Sunday in March (02:00 CET) to the last Sunday in October (03:00 CEST). This is shared with several other EU member states.

== History ==
In the early 19th century, Poland observed UTC+01:24 as it was the time corresponding to the offset of their local mean time at the Warsaw meridian, which was also known as Warsaw mean time. Warsaw switched to CET on 5 August 1915, and the rest of Poland officially adopted CET on 31 May 1922. After World War II, daylight saving time was introduced in 1946 by a resolution of the Council of Ministers, though it would be repealed on 21 September 1949. Daylight saving time was in use again between 1957 and 1964, and has been in use since 1977.

In 2021, following the European Parliament's vote to end daylight saving time, the Centre for Public Opinion Research conducted a survey regarding the time shift, which showed 78 percent of Poles surveyed were not in favour of daylight saving time. Despite this, however, it is not yet known whether the last time change in Poland will occur in 2021 or continue to be observed as there are currently no legal regulations for it.

== Daylight saving time ==
Daylight saving time, which moves an hour ahead, is observed from the last Sunday in March (02:00 CET) to the last Sunday in October (03:00 CEST). DST has been in use since 1977; however, it was previously used from 1946 to 1949 and 1957 to 1964.

Year	Start	End
2021	28 Mar	31 Oct
2022	27 Mar	30 Oct
2023	26 Mar	29 Oct
2024	31 Mar	27 Oct
2025	30 Mar	26 Oct
2026	29 Mar	25 Oct

== Notation ==
Polish people use both the 12-hour clock and 24-hour clock, though the 12-hour clock is more commonly used in speech when unambiguous, with the AM/PM distinction denoted by phrases in Polish when needed; written communication uses 24-hour clock almost universally, including written forms of informal speech and exclusively in official documents.

== IANA time zone database ==
In the IANA time zone database, Poland is given one zone in the file zone.tab – Europe/Warsaw. Data for Poland directly from zone.tab of the IANA time zone database; columns marked with * are the columns from zone.tab itself:

c.c.*	coordinates*	TZ*	Comments	UTC offset	DST
PL	+5215+02100	Europe/Warsaw		+01:00	+02:00

== See also ==
- Time in Europe
- List of time zones by country
- List of time zones by UTC offset
