= Arnold Szyfman Polish Theatre =

Theatre in Warsaw, Poland

Coordinates: 52.2385°N 21.0197°E

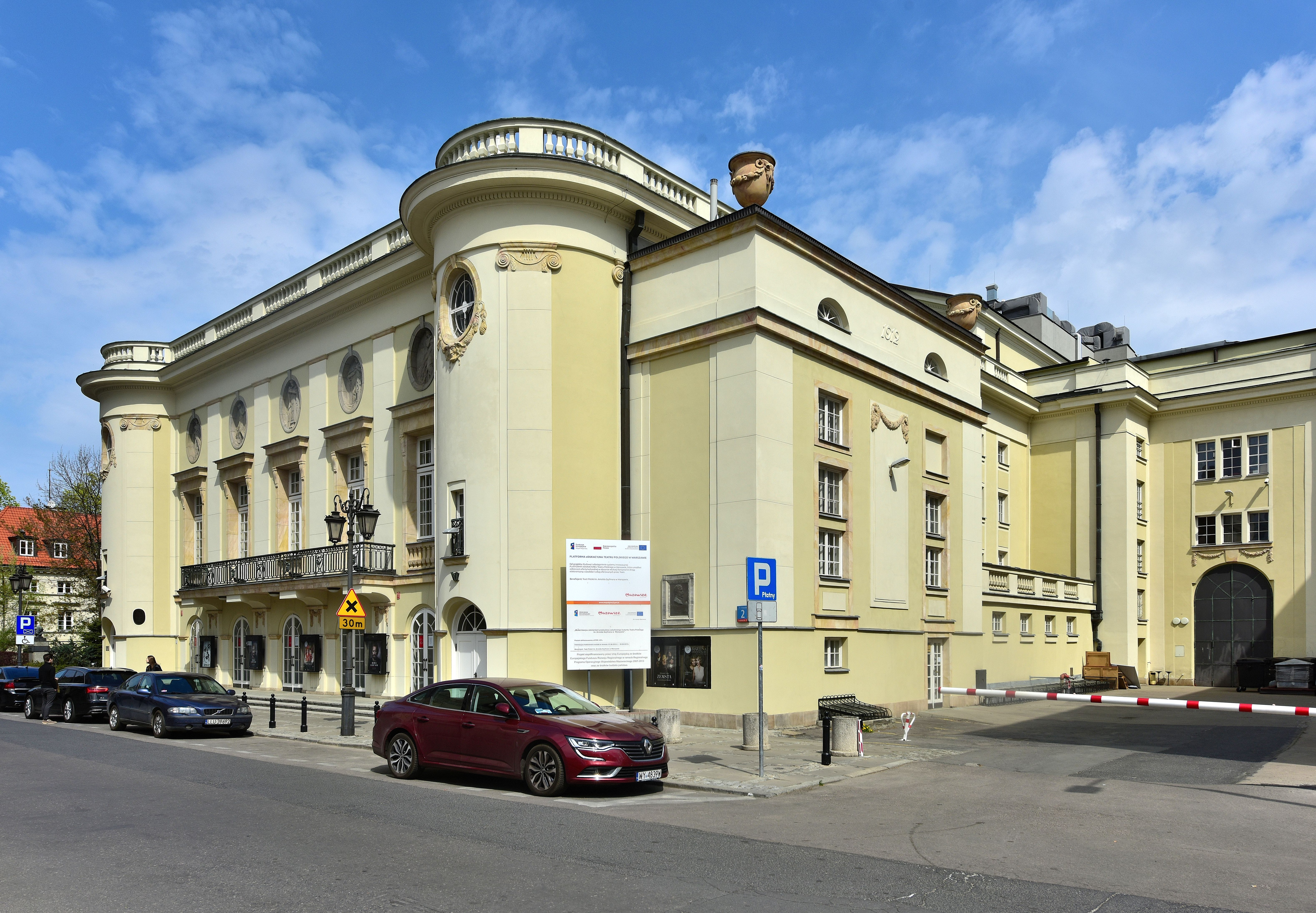
Polish Theatre in Warsaw

Polish Theatre in Warsaw (Polish: Teatr Polski im. Arnolda Szyfmana w Warszawie) is a theatre in Warsaw, Poland. It is located at ul. Karasia 2. The current artistic director is Andrzej Seweryn.

The theatre was initiated by Arnold Szyfman and designed by Czesław Przybylski. Opened on 29 January 1913, the facility featured Poland's first revolving stage. It is a private enterprise staging Polish and foreign classics, contemporary drama, as well as popular plays.

The theater was taken over by the Nazis and the building damaged during World War II. It was also the first theatre to be nationalized in Poland.
