= Theatre Museum (disambiguation) =

The Theatre Museum in the Covent Garden district of London, England, was the United Kingdom's national museum of the performing arts.

Theatre Museum may also refer to:

- The Theatre Museum in New York City, New York, U.S.
- Theatre Museum, Moscow in Moscow (Bakhrushin Museum), Russia
- Theatre Museum, Saint Petersburg in Saint Petersburg, Russia
- Theatre Museum, Warsaw in Warsaw, Poland
- Theatre Museum Canada in Toronto, Ontario, Canada
- Theatre Museum in the Court Theatre in Copenhagen, Denmark
