= Piotr Zajlich =

Piotr Zajlich (26 June 1884 in Warsaw – 18 April 1948 in Piaseczno), pseudonym Szuwałow, was a Polish dancer and choreographer.

== Career ==
He was a soloist of Warszawskie Teatry Rządowe (since 1910), soloist and choreographer in Anna Pavlova group (1912–1914), managing director of Teatr Wielki in Warsaw (since 1937). During the years of 1917–1934 he was a managing director and balletmaster of Warsaw ballet and director of Warsaw ballet school. After World War II he was a co-organiser of Warsaw opera and ballet.

His most notable choreography works include Pan Twardowski of Ludomir Różycki, Świtezianka of Eugeniusz Morawski, and Pieśni miłosne Hafiza of Karol Szymanowski.
