= Theatre Square (Warsaw) =

Square in Warsaw

Coordinates: 52°14′39″N 21°0′34″E

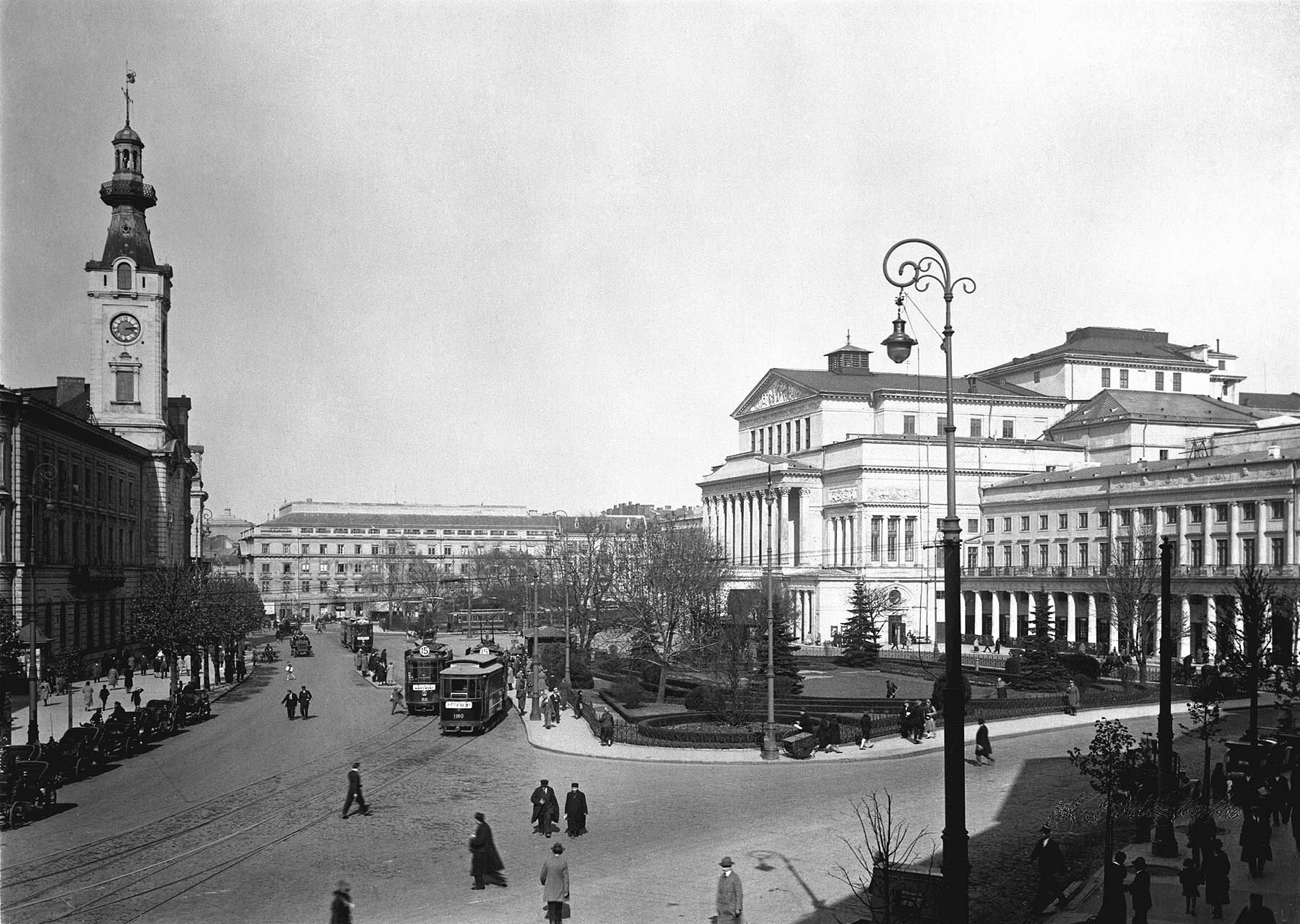
Theatre Square, c. 1925. Jabłonowski Palace at left, Great Theater at right.

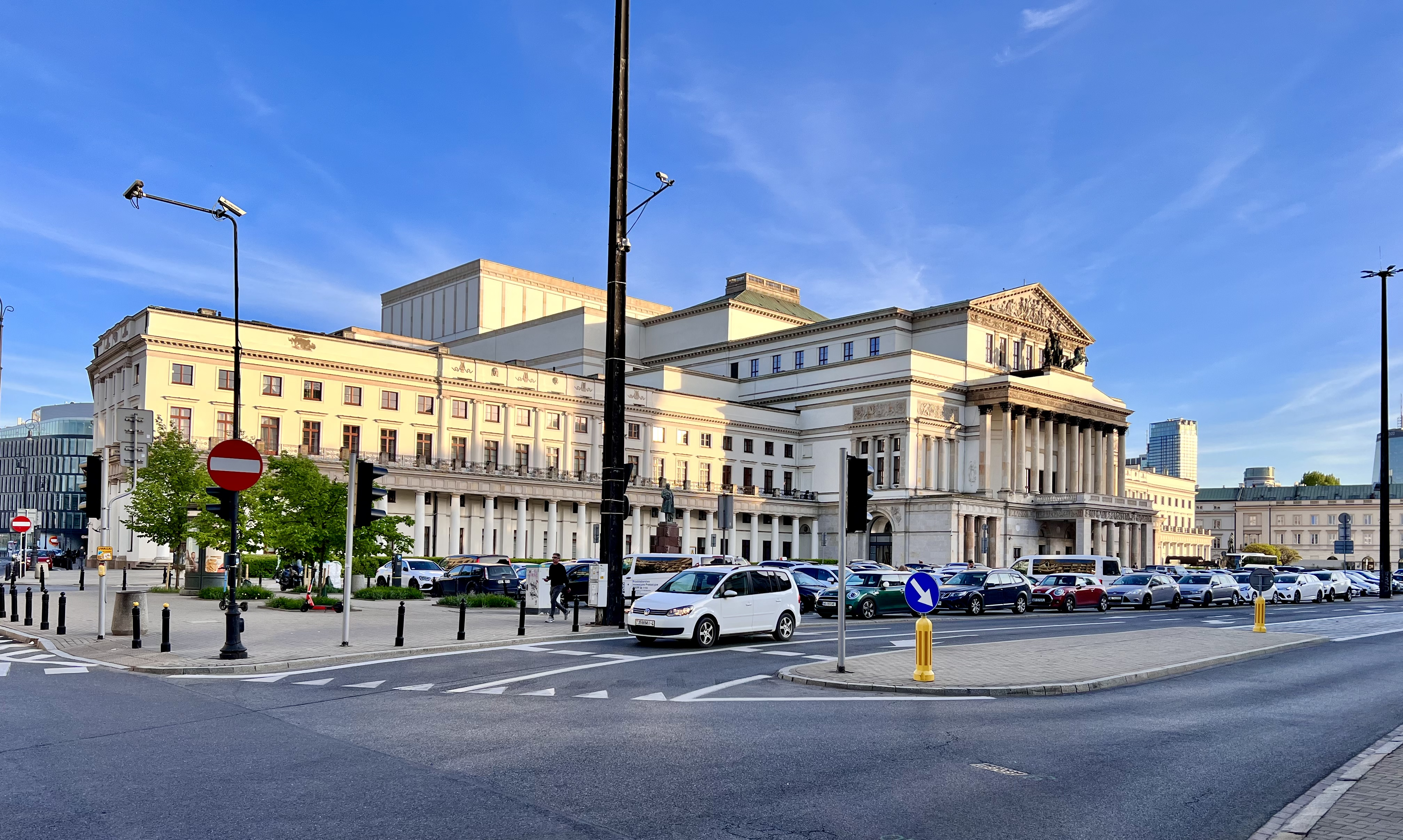
Great Theater

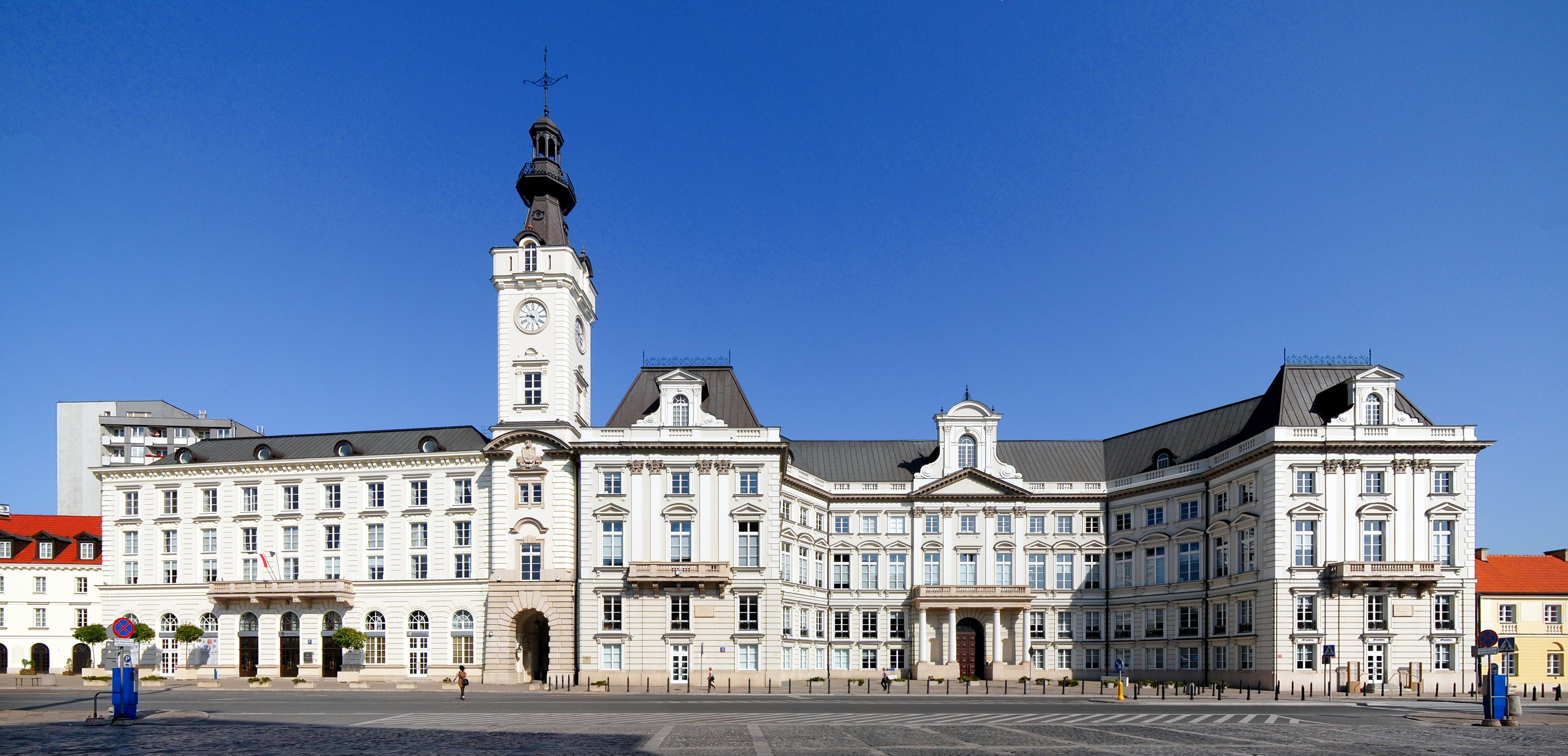
Jabłonowski Palace after reconstruction in 1997

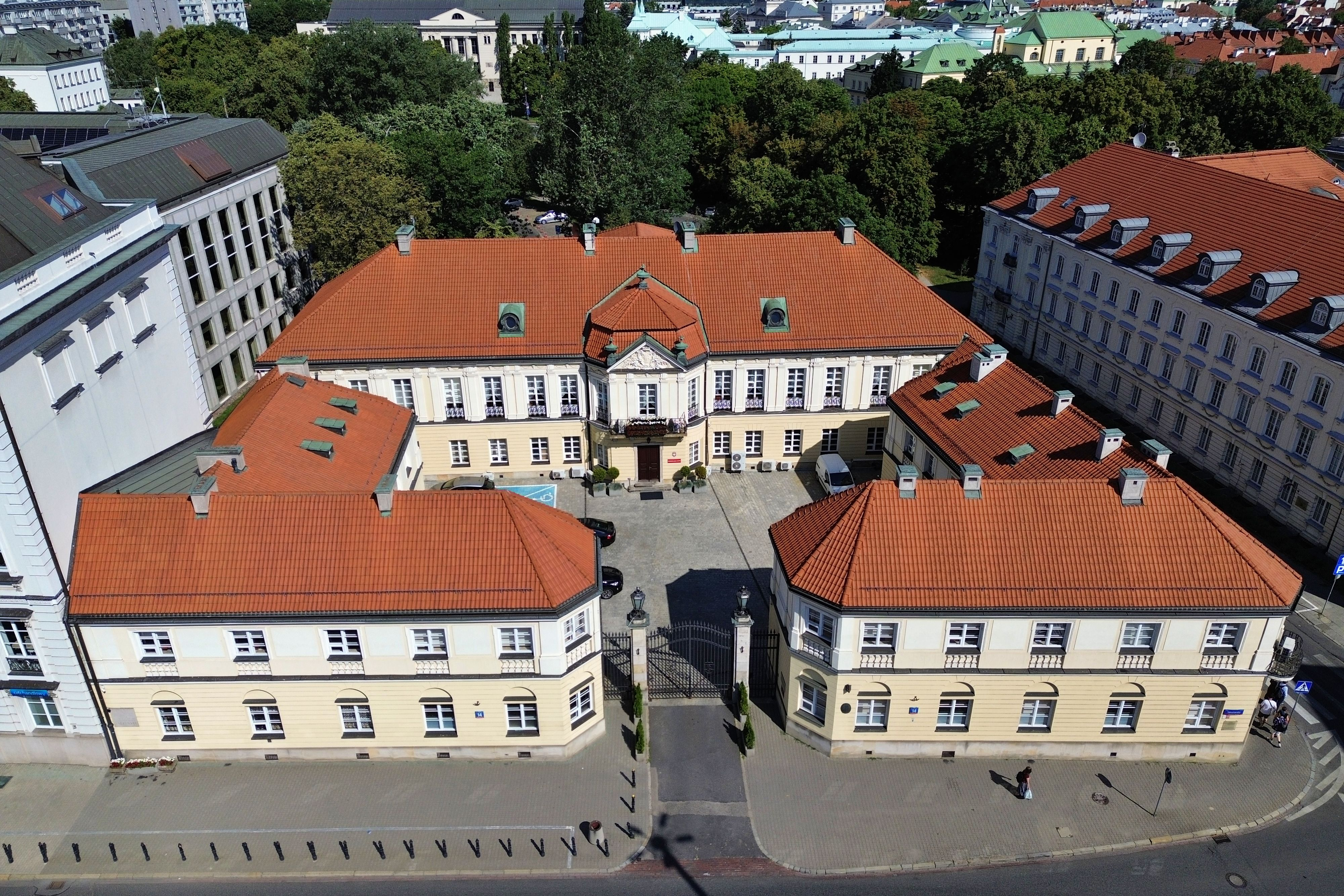
Blank Palace

Theatre Square (Polish: plac Teatralny) is a major square in the Śródmieście district of Warsaw, Poland. It spans from the Great Theatre building to Senatorska Street.

The origins of the square date back to the beginning of the 19th century, when a small square was established in 1818. From 1825 to 1832, the Great Theatre building was constructed. When the city administration was relocated to the Jabłonowski Palace, the square became a centre of city life. Various patriotic demonstrations took place there, including at the time of the failed January Uprising and the Revolution of 1905.

In September 1939, the civilian defense of the city was located in the city hall. During the Warsaw Uprising of 1944, the square witnessed heavy fighting between the Nazi German soldiers and the Home Army partisans. Most of the surrounding buildings were heavily damaged or completely destroyed. After the war, several buildings were restored, excluding the pre-war city hall with its notable clock tower. It was rebuilt according to the original architectural plans only in the late 1990s.

== Landmarks ==
Landmarks on the square include:

- The Great Theatre (reconstructed 1951–65)
- The Jabłonowski Palace (reconstructed 1995–97)
- The Blank Palace (named after Piotr Blank, banker to the last king of the Polish–Lithuanian Commonwealth, Stanisław II Augustus)
- Saints Albert and Andrew's Church (Kościół św. Brata Alberta i św. Andrzeja Apostoła – a church for the Warsaw creative communities), reconstructed in 1999)
- Petyskus House (Kamienica Petyskusa), restored in 1950
- The Warsaw Meridian (a marker for the meridian, set up in 1880 – since superseded by Greenwich Mean Time)
