= Warsaw meridian =

Meridian line in Poland

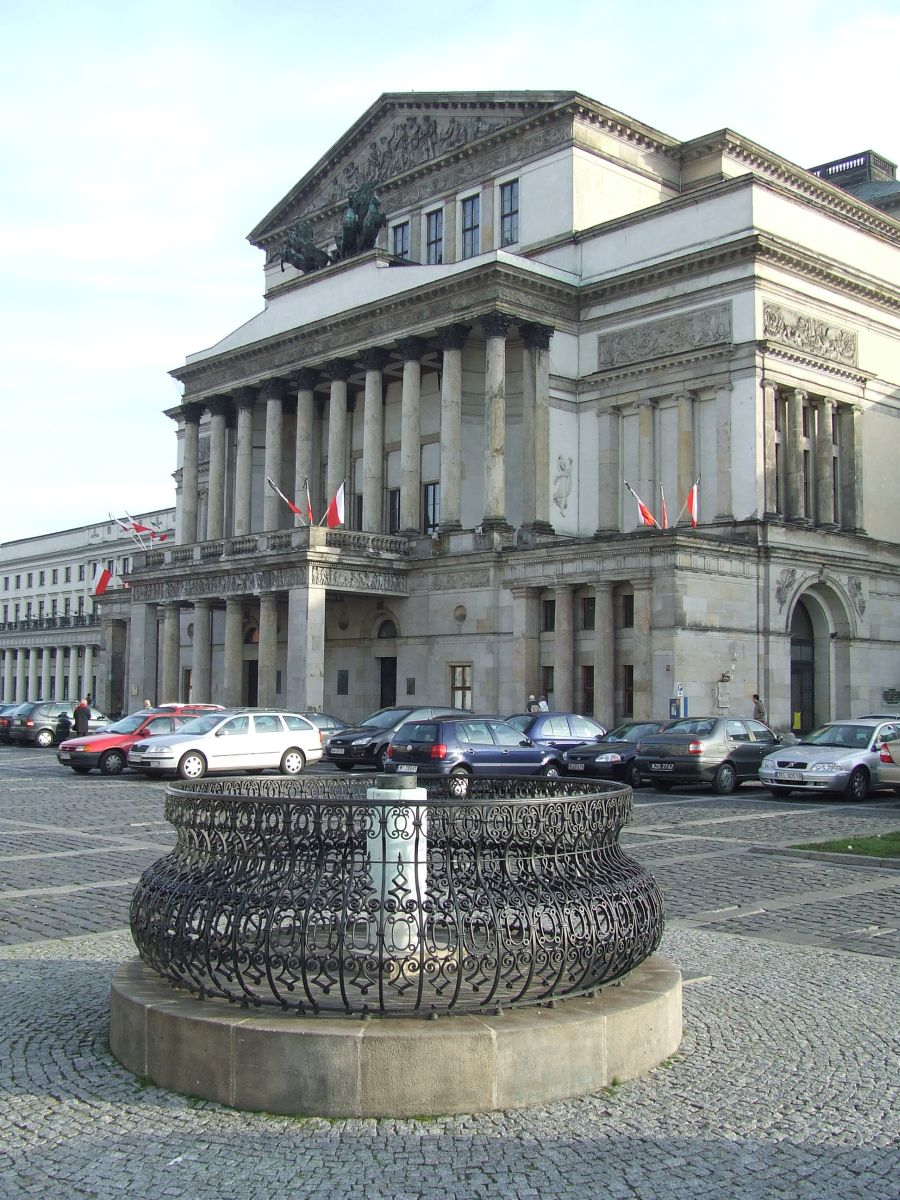
Warsaw meridian

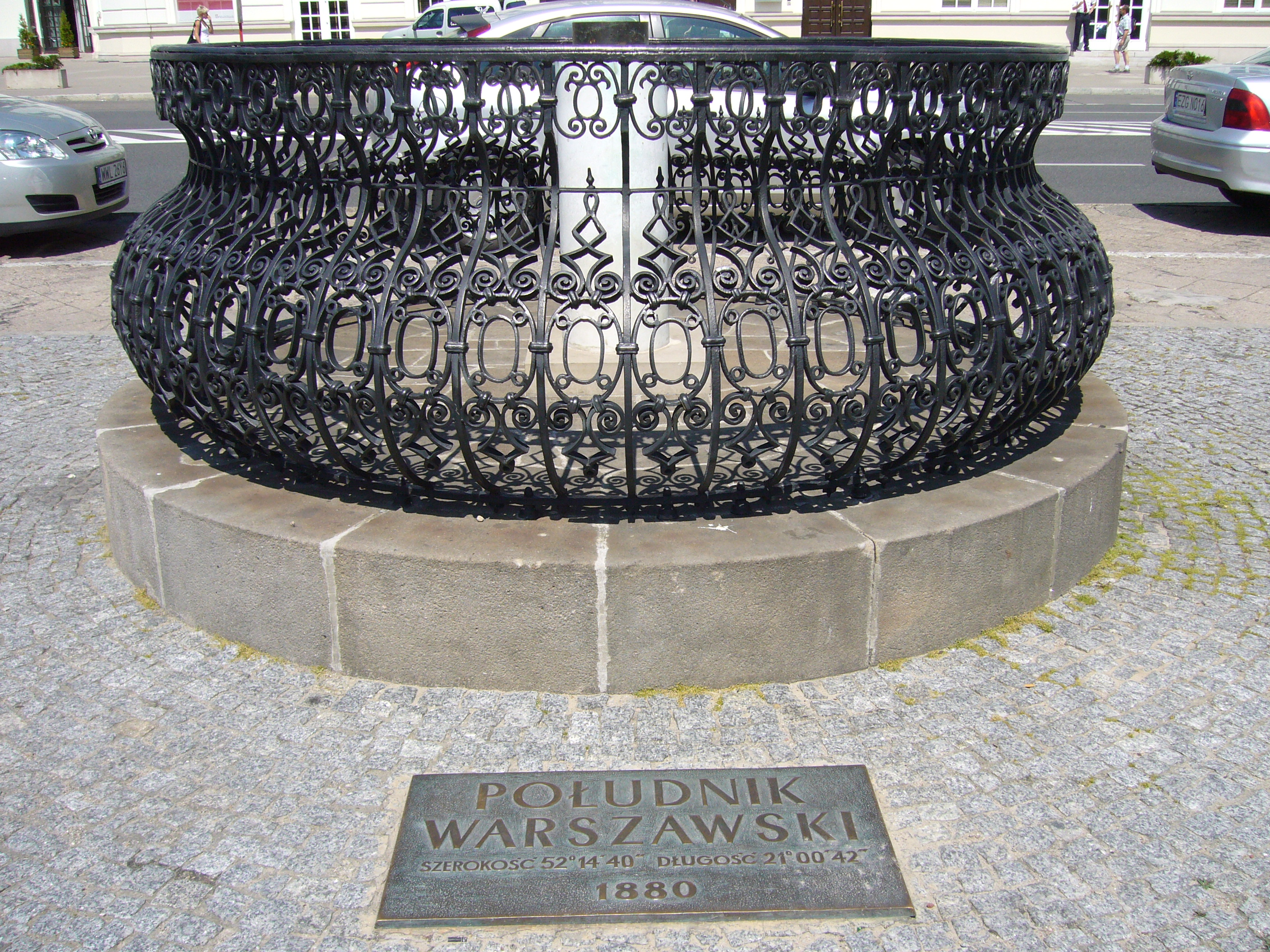
Description plate of the Warsaw meridian

The Warsaw meridian (Polish: południk warszawski) is a meridian line running through Warsaw. The local mean time at the meridian was known as Warsaw Mean Time. It corresponds to an offset from UTC of +01:24.

It is marked as being located at 52°14′40″N 21°00′42″E (in accordance with the coordinate system used at that time). Coordinate values of the meridian which are engraved on a plate on the sidewalk differ from the current ones, the actual coordinates are 52°14′38.302963″N 21°00′33.036621″E. The column also contains information in Russian.

== History ==
In 1880, in the Theatre Square in front of the Jabłonowski Palace (then the city hall), a stone pillar was erected surrounded by an iron railing with a sign indicating the geographical location and the height above sea level and the level of Vistula. The Warsaw meridian passes through the top of the pillar and top of the clock tower of the Jabłonowski Palace, which served as point measurements. The plate on the sidewalk was constructed much later, in 1965.

Four years after the construction of the column in Warsaw, Greenwich Mean Time effectively became the international standard for time calculation around the world based on the Prime meridian at Greenwich in London.

The Meridian is featured in the 1965 film Pingwin (Penguin) starring Zbigniew Cybulski.
