= Marywil =

Coordinates: 52°14′37″N 21°00′35″E

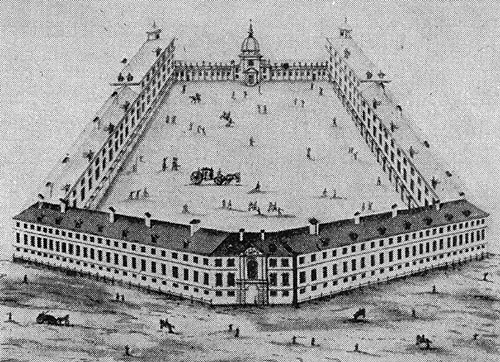
- Marywil in 1733.
- Interactive map of the Marywil area

General information
- Architectural style: Baroque
- Location: Warsaw, Poland
- Construction started: 1692
- Completed: 1697
- Demolished: 1825-1833
- Client: Maria Kazimiera Sobieska

Design and construction
- Architect: Tylman Gamerski

Marywil (from French Ville de Marie) was a large commercial centre and a palace in Warsaw, occupying roughly the place where the Grand Theatre stands today.

== History ==
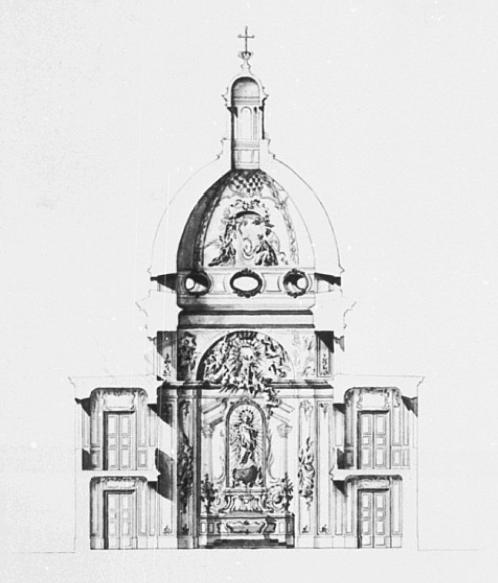
Chapel of Holy Mother of Victories in about 1730.

Marywil was built some time between 1692 and 1697 by Maria Kazimiera, the Queen of Poland, to commemorate the victory of her husband, King John III of Poland over the Turks in the Battle of Vienna. A large, pentagonal baroque building was designed by Tylman van Gameren and modelled after Place des Vosges and Place Dauphine in Paris. The building, bearing strong resemblance to Spanish baroque town market squares, contained shops and houses of the merchants, while the central square was used as a marketplace. The small apartments with depots were leased to foreign merchants who competed with local tradesmen. The northern edge of the complex housed a chapel to the Holy Mother of Victories. The building also served as a royal residence.

In 1738 the complex was bought by the Załuski family and it was there that Józef Jędrzej Załuski started the famous Załuski Library. Around 1744 the building was converted into a monastery by Antonina Zamoyska. In 1807 four large houses were built in the former marketplace. Between 1817 and 1821 Chrystian Piotr Aigner reconstructed the eastern wing in accordance with contemporary styles and added a seven story high clock tower. Simultaneously, in 1819 the monastery was moved out of the complex and it was converted into a housing quarter. However, soon afterwards, in 1825-1833 the entire complex was demolished to make way for the new Grand Theatre constructed there.

== See also ==
- Marymont
- Kazanowski Palace
- Marie Casimire Louise de La Grange d'Arquien
