= St. Anthony of Padua Church (Śródmieście, Warsaw) =

Church of St. Anthony of Padua in Warsaw (Downtown)
- Kościół św. Antoniego Padewskiego w Warszawie (Śródmieście)
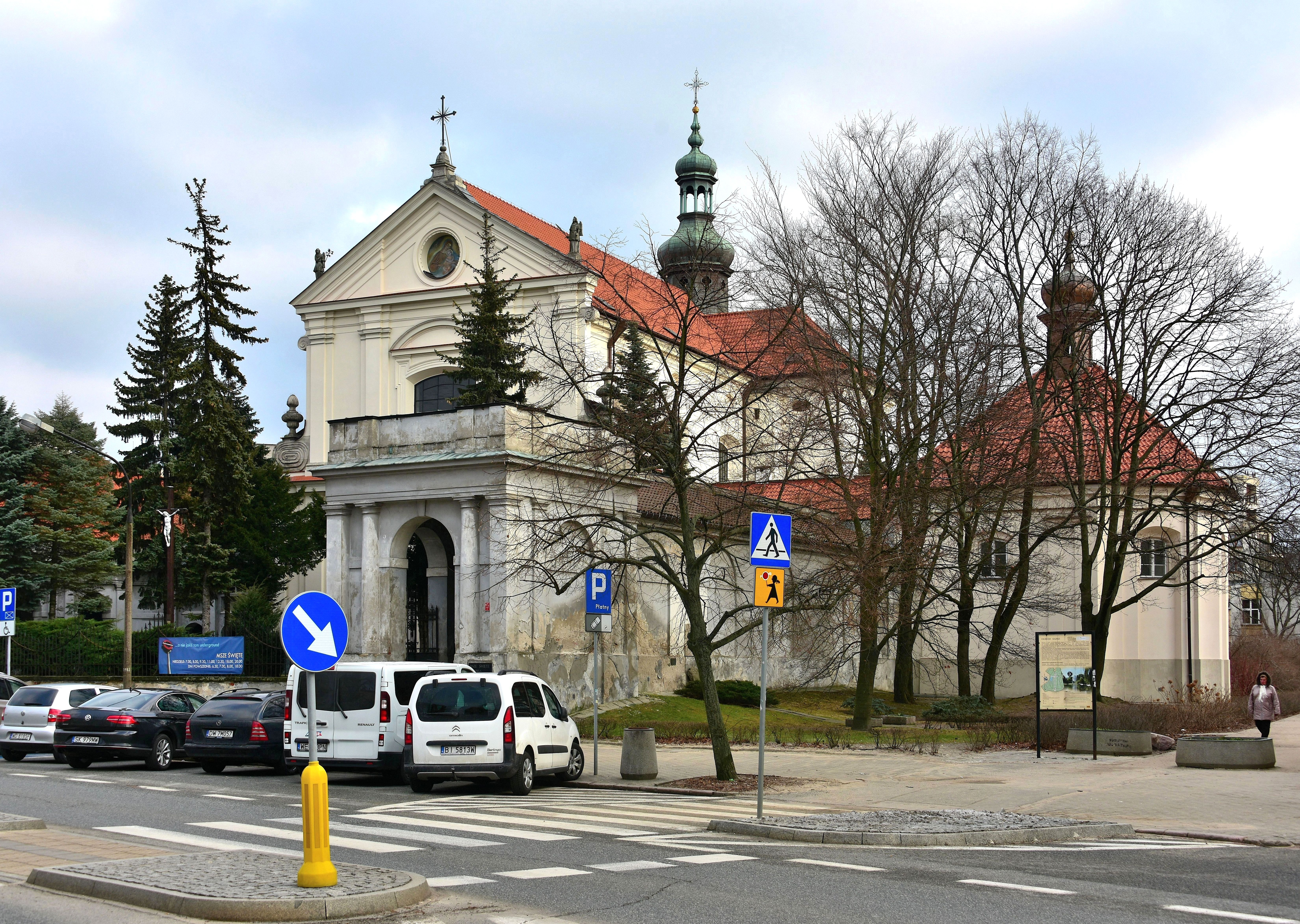
- The church of St Anthony from the front
- Church of St. Anthony of Padua in Warsaw (Downtown)
- 52.242778°N 21.006389°E
- Location: Warsaw
- Country: Poland
- Denomination: Roman Catholic
- Website: www.swietyantoni.com.pl

History
- Founder: Sigismund III Vasa
- Dedication: Anthony of Padua

Architecture
- Architect: Simone Giuseppe Belotti
- Completed: 1668-1680

Administration
- Archdiocese: Warsaw
- Parish: St. Anthony of Padua in Warsaw

Clergy
- Pastor: Kamil Łętowski

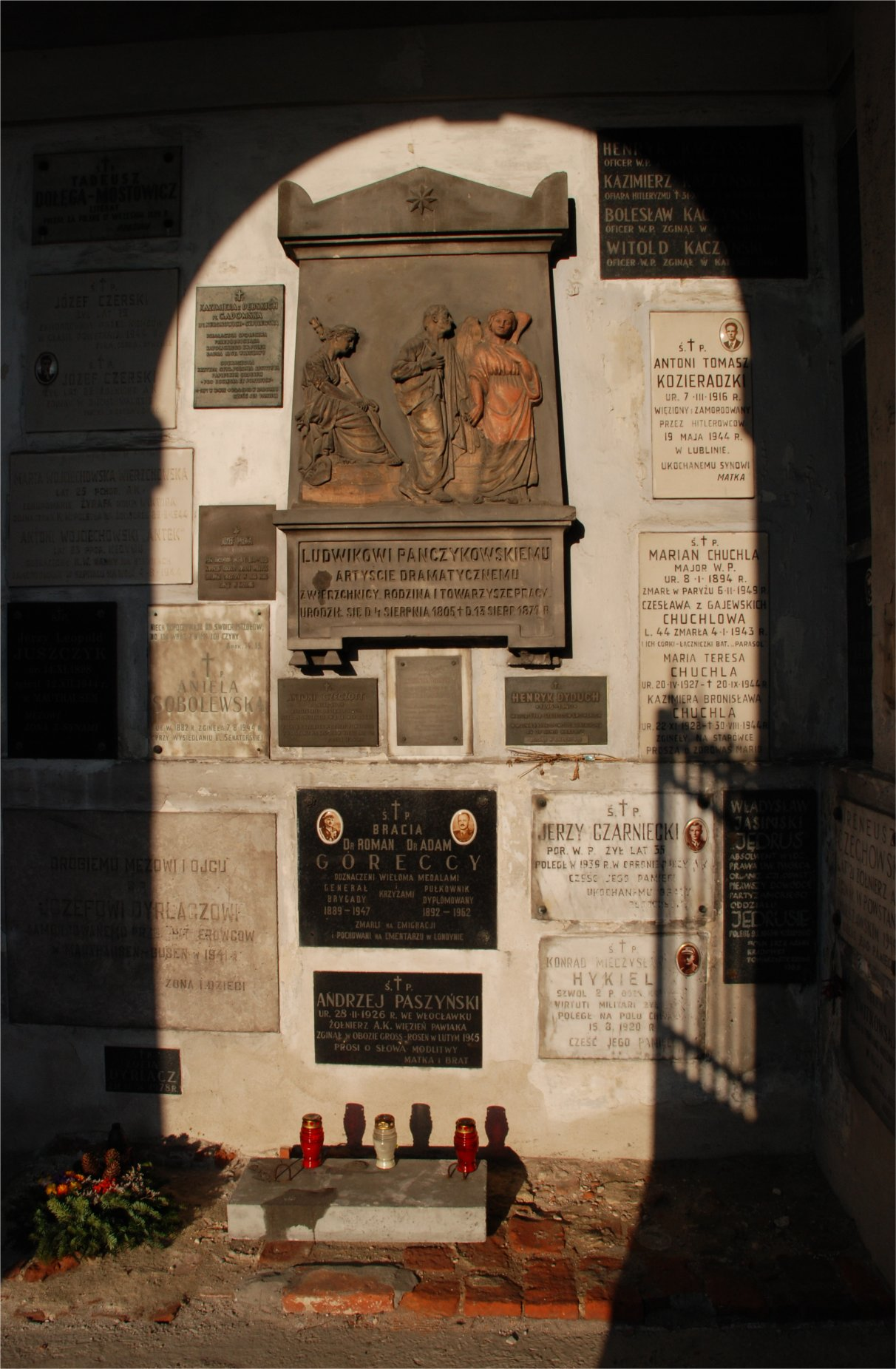
Just a few of the epitaphs in the interior galleries

The Church of St. Anthony of Padua is located on Warsaw's downtown at 31/33 Senatorska Street.

== Description ==
The first Warsaw baroque church with a simple facade, it has a nave, a rectangular interior and two side chapels. The porch has a separated lattice (from the 18th century), and the side altars have images of St. Francis and St. Anthony of Padua, painted by Rafał Hadziewicz, and an image of Christ on the Cross painted by Annibale Vinici.

Inside the galleries are numerous epitaphs for deserving people (including the writer Klementyna Hoffmanowa, the painter Rafał Hadziewicz, the poet Stanisław Jachowicz, the president of Vilnius Wiktor Malaszewski, and Stanisław Englert), people killed during World War II, people who died in Nazi concentration camps, and Polish soldiers who fought in defence of their country.

== History ==
Construction of the first church at this site was funded by King Sigismund III Vasa, thankful for winning the Siege of Smolensk, in 1611. The date of the event (13 June) suggested St. Anthony of Padua as the choice of the patron saint for the church. A resolution in the Sejm entrusted the church to the Order of the Franciscans reformers.

During the Swedish invasion in 1657, the original wooden church was destroyed by allied troops led by George II Rákóczi.

Castellan Stanisław Skarszewski founded the new church between 1668 and 1680, this time built of brick. In 1679 the temple was consecrated by the Bishop of Poznań Stefan Wierzbowski. The church was probably built to a design by Simone Giuseppe Belotti. Sculptures inside the church are the work of Jan Jerzy Plersch.

The temple was often visited by King John III Sobieski. From 1734 to 1735 King Augustus III of Saxony had a box built for him and his wife (the royal couple lived in a palace next door) on the right side of the chancel. In 1766, the monastery hid the famous Casanova, who was wanted by Franciszek Ksawery Branicki.

From 1767 to 1781 the chapel of the Virgin Mary was built, and in 1792 the cloister was built perpendicular to the side arms to a design by Hilary Szpilowski. In 1850, a painting of the Virgin Mary, was added beside the tympanum at the front, and in 1851 a figure of Mary by Antoni Messing was placed on the pediment in the church.

In 1866 the parish was founded. In 1867, in connection with the dissolution of the Order of the Franciscans in the repression following the January Uprising, the church was taken over Diocesan priests. In subsequent years, the main altar was moved to the wall of the chancel, and choir and sacristy were removed.

In 1895 the chapel of the Holy Family was built with an altar made by Wincent Bogaczyk. In 1907 the chapel was built for the Sacred Heart of Jesus.

The church was badly damaged by the German army during the battles with insurgents in 1944. Especially affected were the side altar, the pulpit and organ, the chapel of Holy Family, the grille, and a part of the chapel's stucco arches. There was considerable human cost too - as mentioned on a Tchorek plaque at the church, over 100 people were executed there.

The church was rebuilt from 1950 to 1956 according to a design by Karol Szymański. The main altar was consecrated by Cardinal Stefan Wyszyński on 18 January, 1969.

In 1949 the church and parish had again been transferred back to the Franciscan Order.

== Bibliography ==
- Encyklopedia Warszawy, Wydawnictwo Naukowe PWN. Warszawa. 1994. Page 96. ISBN 83-01-08836-2 (in Polish).
