= UTC+01:24 =

Former time zone

UTC+01:24 is an identifier for a time offset from UTC of +01:24. In ISO 8601 the associated time would be written as 2025-03-06T02:01:39+01:24.

== History ==
The time corresponding to that offset was the local mean time at the Warsaw meridian and was also known as Warsaw mean time.

Since the early nineteenth century, it was commonly used for timekeeping purposes in the lands of the former Polish–Lithuanian Commonwealth.

On 5 August 1915, Warsaw switched to Central European Time, and the rest of Poland followed suit on 31 May 1922.
