= Theatre Museum, Warsaw =

Museum in Warsaw, Poland

Coordinates: 52.243°N 21.011°E

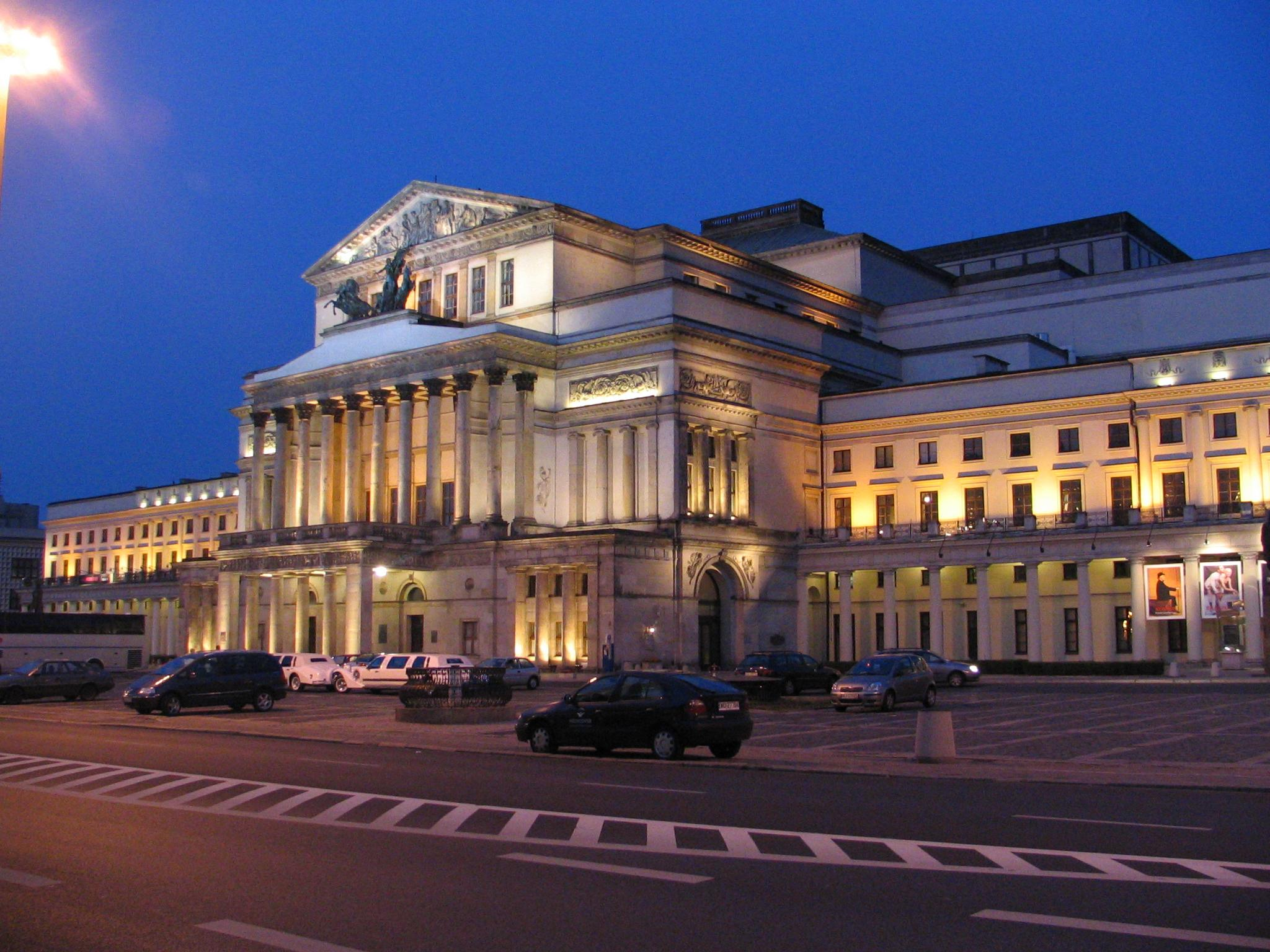
Teatr Wielki (Grand Theater) in Warsaw, home of the museum

The Theatre Museum in Warsaw is a museum of the history of theatre in Poland and other countries.

In 1957–1966 it operated as a branch of the Warsaw Historical Museum. Since 1965 it has been operating in the Grand Theatre, in rooms designed by Mieczysław Piprek. The museum was co-founded by Ewa Jeglińska.

The museum conducts activities related to the collection and development, exhibition and educational activities. Its collection consists of tens of thousands of objects (both museological and archival) and is divided into a number of departments: sculpture, painting, drawing and graphic arts, souvenirs (relating to outstanding people of the theatre), stage designs, costumes, photographs, records, manuscripts and documents, posters, programs, compact prints, continuous prints, notes, and negatives. The museum also has several thematic archives: Archives of the Polish Theatre, Leon Schiller, Juliusz Osterwa, Jacek Woszczerowicz, Tadeusz Łomnicki, and the STS Theatre Archives.

== Sources ==
- J. Szczublewski, Teatr Wielki w Warszawie 1833–1993, Warszawa 1993
