= Blank Palace =

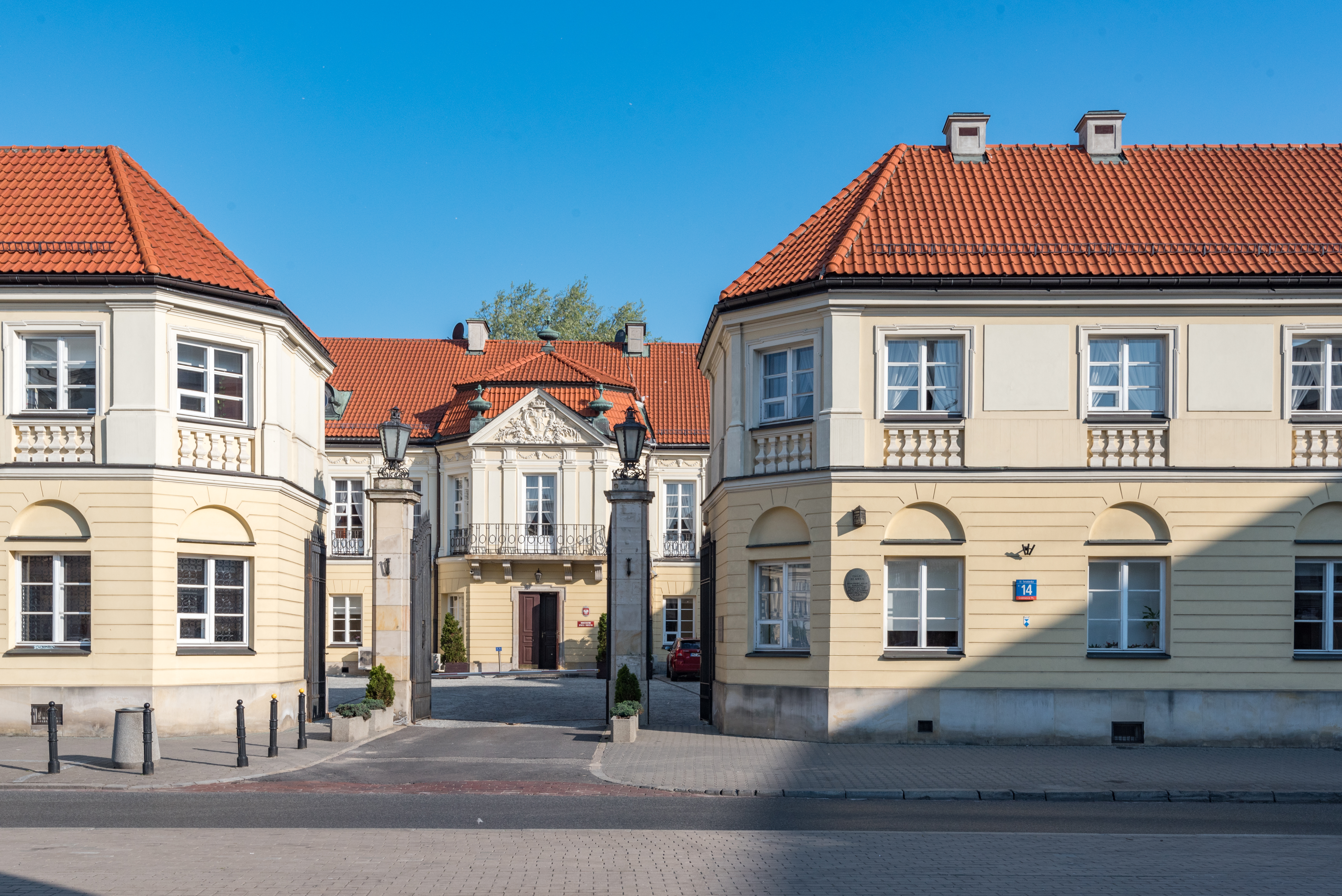
- Pałac Blanka

- Location of Blank Palace in Poland
- 52°14′41″N 21°00′36″E
- Location: Warsaw, Mazowsze Province, Poland

History
- Built: 1764
- Demolished: 1944
- Rebuilt: 1947-1949

Site notes
- Architect: Szymon Bogumił Zug
- Architectural style: Classicist

The Blank Palace (Polish: Pałac Blanka) is a historic building on Senatorska Street in Warsaw, Poland. It is adjacent the much larger Jabłonowski Palace.

The palace was built by architect Szymon Bogumił Zug between 1762 and 1764 for Filip Nereusz Szaniawski. In 1777, ownership was transferred to a Warsaw banker of French descent, Piotr Blank.

In the interwar period, the palace served as the residence of the Mayor of Warsaw, Stefan Starzyński. It was heavily damaged during the 1944 Warsaw Uprising and was rebuilt between 1947 and 1949.

The Blank Palace now houses the Ministry of Sport and Tourism.

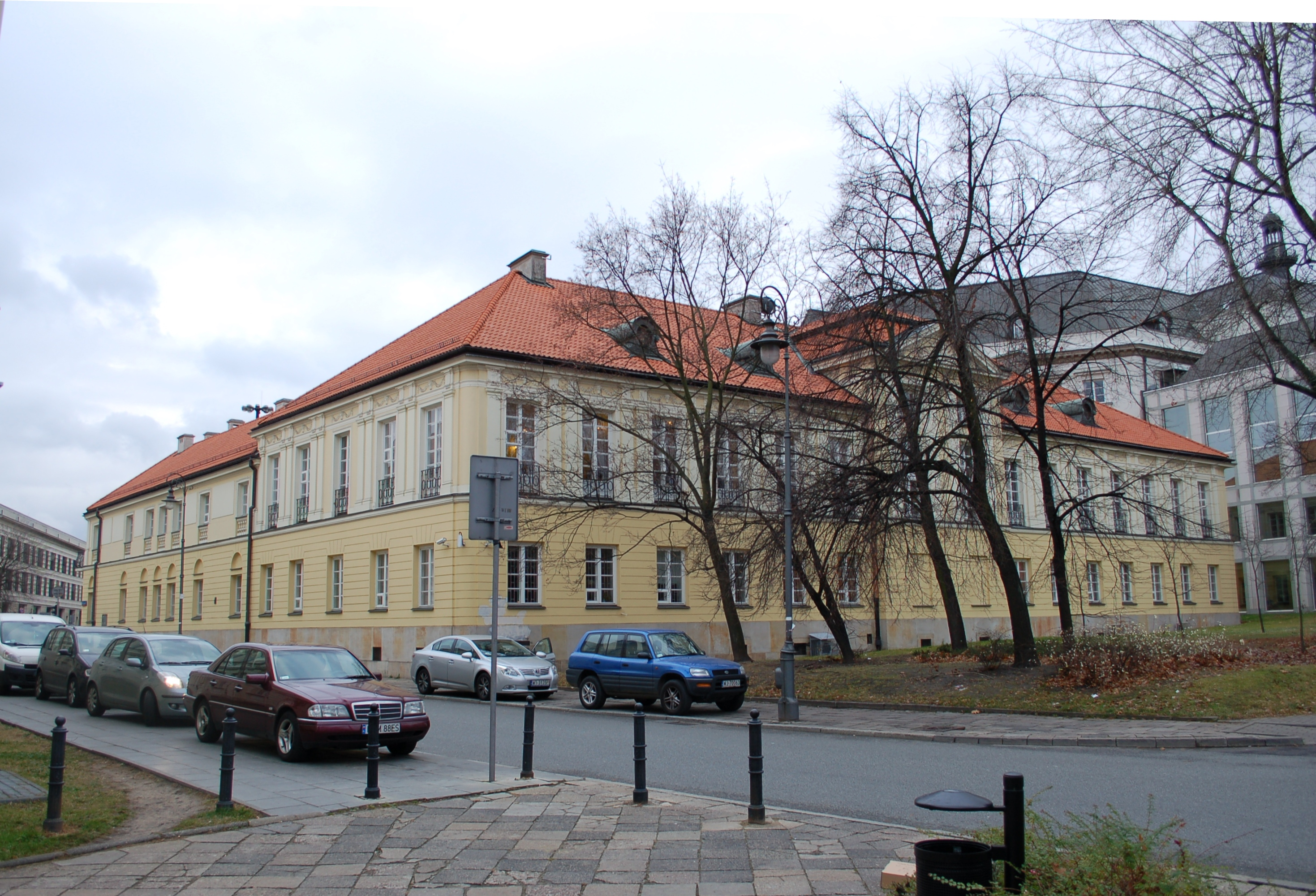
Blank Palace's east face

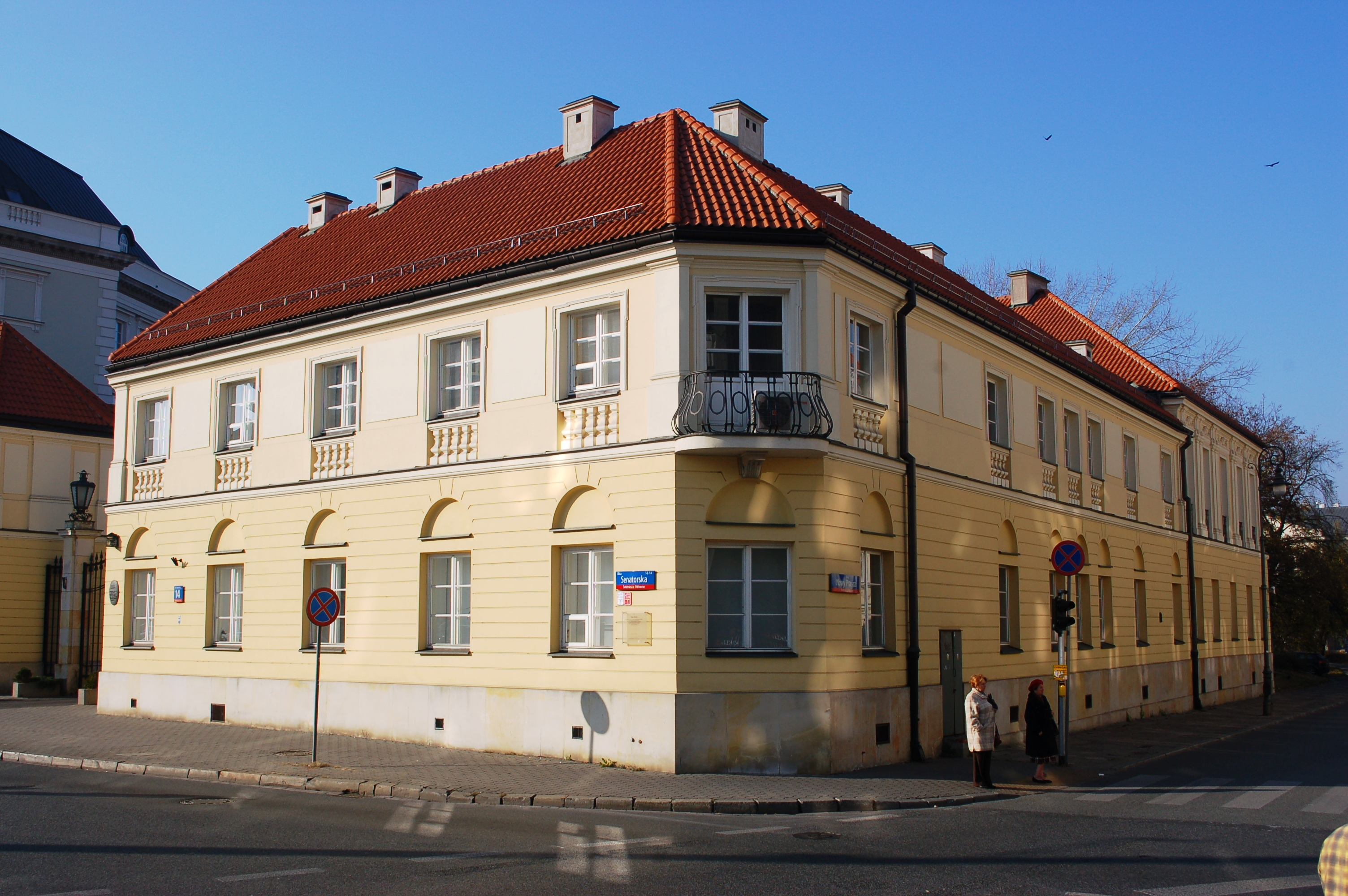
Blank Palace at ulica Senatorska and Nowy Przejazd

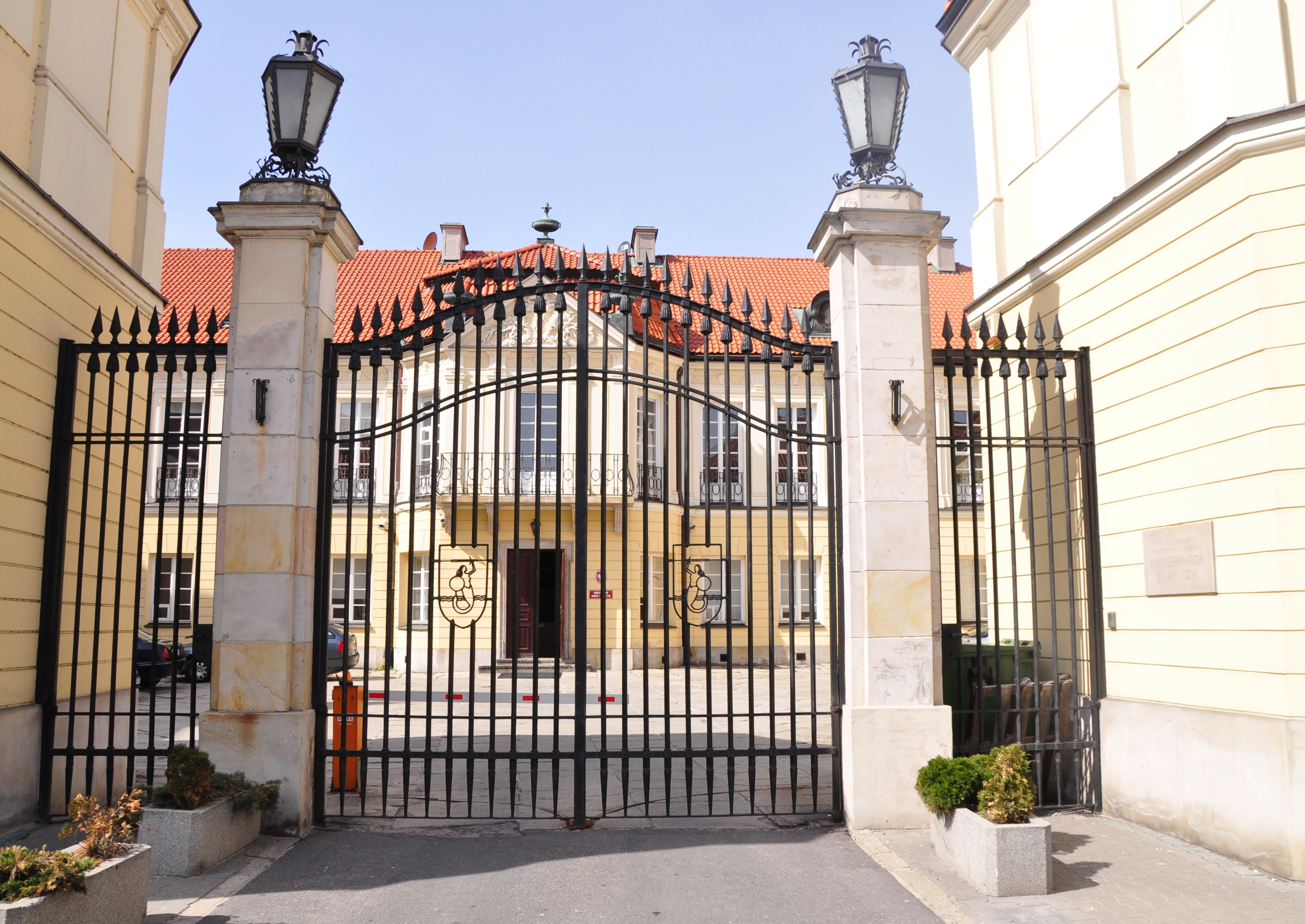
Blank Palace gate
