= Arnold Szyfman =

Polish theatre director and stage director of Jewish origin

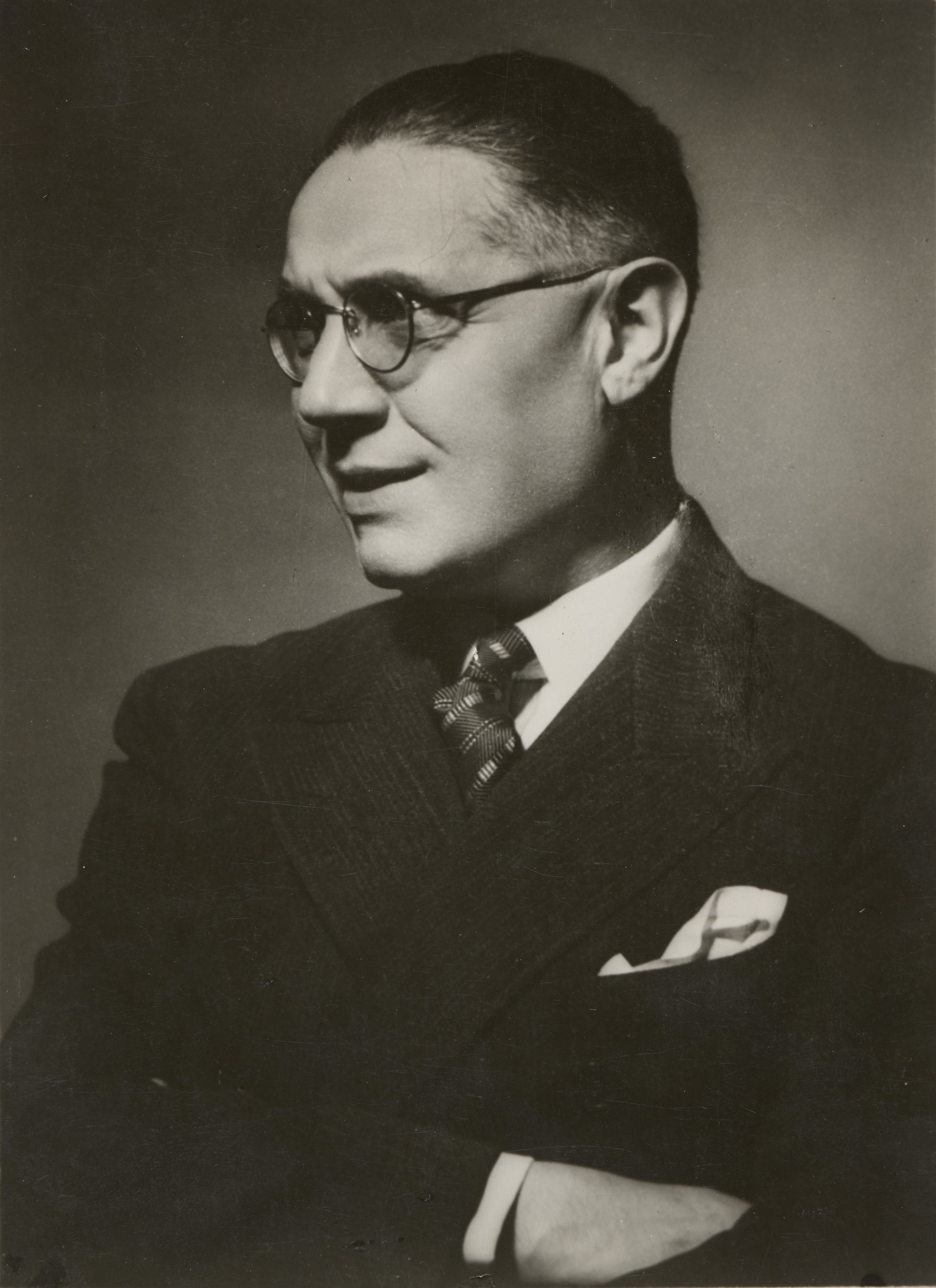
- Born: 23 November 1882; Ulanów, Kingdom of Galicia
- Died: 11 January 1967 (aged 84); Warsaw, Polish People's Republic
- Citizenship: Pole
- Education: Jagiellonian University
- Occupation: Theatre director
- Known for: Founder of the Polish Theatre in Warsaw

Arnold Szyfman (23 November 1882 in Ulanów – 11 January 1967 in Warsaw) was a Polish theatre director and stage director of Jewish origin. Founder of the Polish Theatre in Warsaw. He supervised the construction of Teatr Polski in Warsaw which opened in 1913 with Zygmunt Krasiński's Irydion. One of the most beautiful playhouses in Europe, it was equipped with a revolving stage and up-to-date lighting, and was under Szyfman's management from 1913 to 1939, except for his two-year internment in Russia in the First World War. Following his hiding during the next war, In July 1945, he took up the position of director of the Polish Theater, stepping down from the position of director of the Theater Department at the Ministry of Culture and Art was fired by the communist authorities in 1949 and returned for a final time from 1955 to 1957. He was also the manager of other Warsaw theatres and companies. At the Polish Theatre, he employed the best artists and directed numerous productions himself, including 22 Shakespeare plays. He was involved in the restoration of the Grand Theatre building in Warsaw.

Awards:

- 1925 – Officer's Cross of the Order of the Restitution of Poland; French Legion of Honor Cavalier's Cross; Corona d'Italia Officer's Cross
- 1946 – Golden Cross of Merit
- 1959 – Order of the Banner of Labour, 1st class
