= Grand Theatre, Warsaw =

Theatre and opera complex in central Warsaw, Poland

Grand Theatre and National Opera in Warsaw

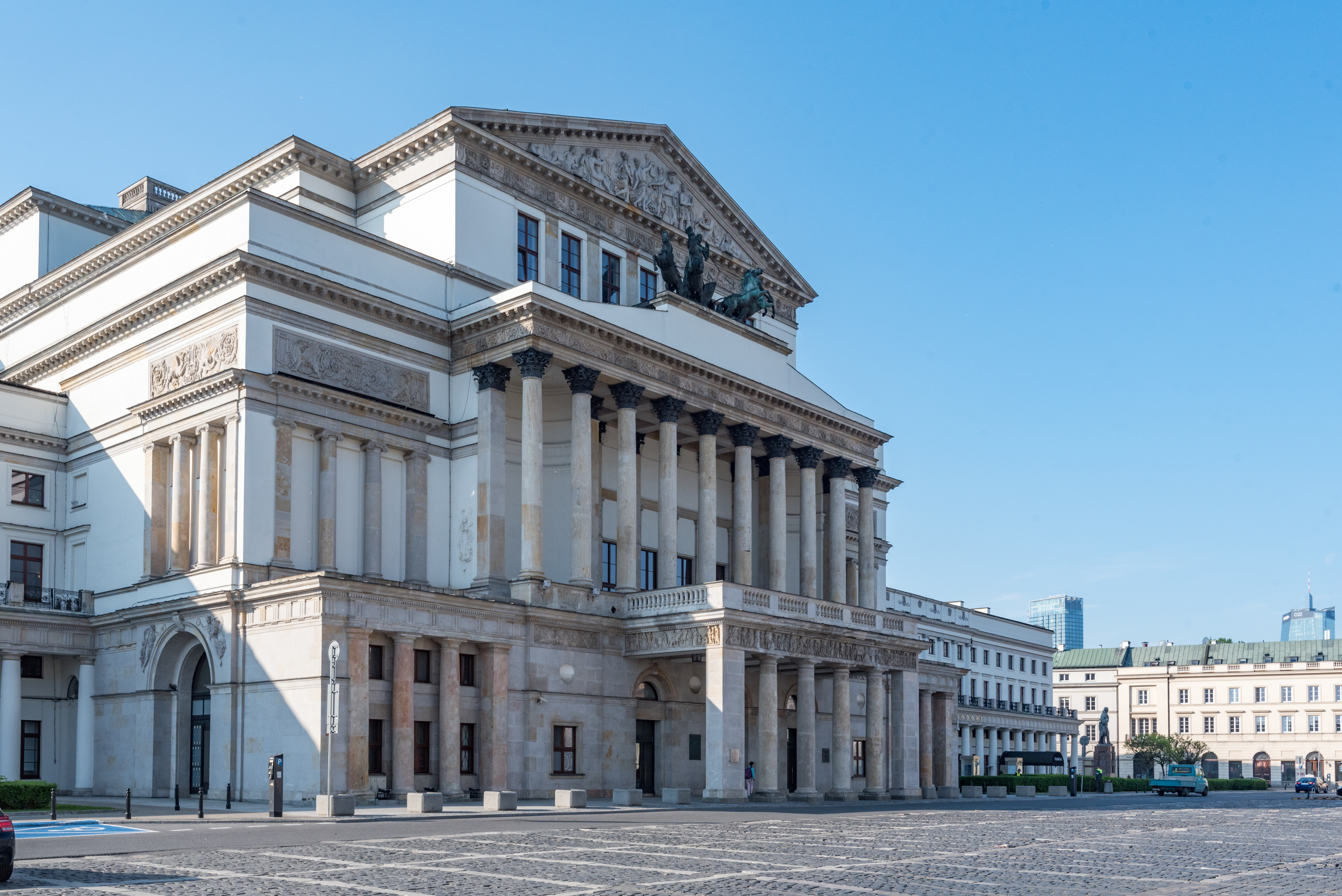
- Interactive map of Grand Theatre and National Opera in Warsaw
- Address: 1 Theatre Square; Warsaw; Poland
- Coordinates: 52.243°N 21.011°E
- Capacity: over 2000 seats
- Public transit: Ratusz Arsenal; Plac Teatralny 01, 02, 04

Construction
- Opened: February 24, 1833; 193 years ago
- Demolished: September 1939
- Rebuilt: 1965 (entirely)
- Years active: 1833–present
- Architects: Antonio Corazzi, Chrystian Piotr Aigner, Bohdan Pniewski

The Grand Theatre, Warsaw (Polish: Teatr Wielki w Warszawie), or the Great Theatre—National Opera (Polish: Teatr Wielki—Opera Narodowa), is a theatre and opera complex situated on the historic Theatre Square in central Warsaw, Poland. The Warsaw Grand Theatre is home to the Polish National Ballet and has a seating capacity of over 2,000.

The Warsaw Grand Theatre was inaugurated on 24 February 1833 with a production of Rossini's The Barber of Seville. After the building's bombing and near-complete destruction in World War II, it was rebuilt and reopened on 19 November 1965 after having been closed for over twenty years. The original building was designed in a neoclassical style by architects Antonio Corazzi and Chrystian Piotr Aigner, and later restored by Bohdan Pniewski.

== History ==
=== From 1833 ===
The Theatre was built on Theatre Square between 1825 and 1833, replacing the former building of Marywil, from Polish classicist designs by the Italian architect Antonio Corazzi of Livorno, to provide a new performance venue for existing opera, ballet, and drama companies active in Warsaw. The building was remodeled several times and, in the period of Poland's political eclipse from 1795 to 1918, it performed an important cultural and political role in producing many works by Polish composers and choreographers.

=== Evolution of Polish opera ===
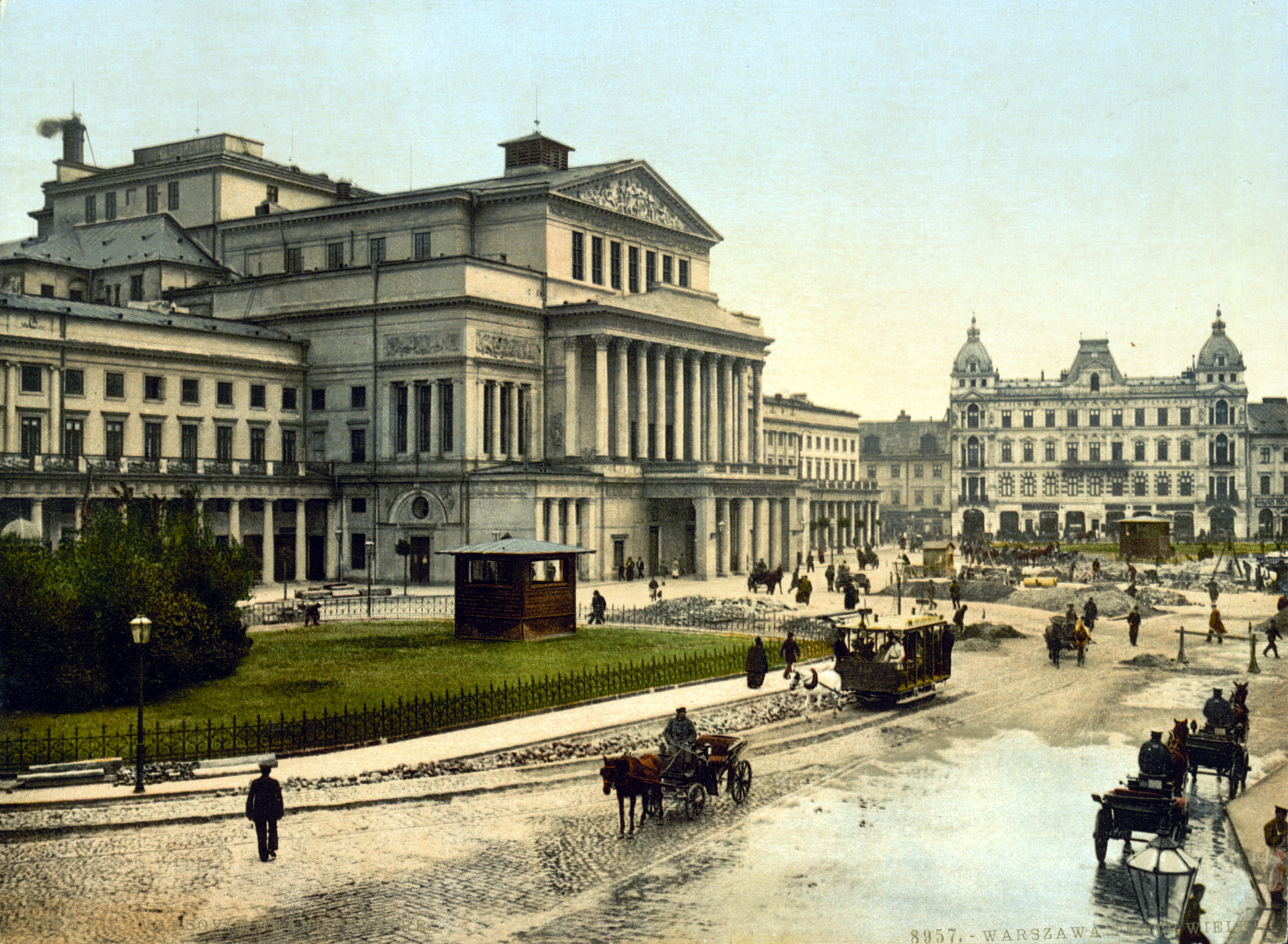
Theatre Square in Warsaw between 1890 and 1905

It was in the new theatre that Stanisław Moniuszko's two best-known operas received their premieres: the complete version of Halka (1858), and The Haunted Manor (1865). After Frédéric Chopin, Moniuszko was the greatest figure in 19th-century Polish music, for in addition to producing his own works, he was director of the Warsaw Opera from 1858 until his death in 1872.

While director of the Grand Theatre, Moniuszko composed The Countess, Verbum Nobile, The Haunted Manor and Paria, and many songs that make up 12 Polish Songbooks.

Also, under Moniuszko's direction, the wooden Summer Theatre (seating 1,065) was built close by in the Saxon Garden. Summer performances were given annually, from the repertories of the Grand and Variety (Rozmaitości) theatres. Józef Szczublewski writes that during this time, even though the country had been partitioned out of political existence by its neighbors, the theatre flourished: "the ballet roused the admiration of foreign visitors; there was no equal troupe of comedians to be found between Warsaw and Paris, and Modrzejewska was an inspiration to drama."

The theatre presented operas by Władysław Żeleński, Ignacy Jan Paderewski, Karol Szymanowski and other Polish composers, as well as ballet productions designed by such choreographers as Roman Turczynowicz, Piotr Zajlich and Feliks Parnell. At the same time, the repertoire included major world opera and ballet classics, performed by the most prominent Polish and foreign singers and dancers. It was also here that the Italian choreographer Virgilius Calori produced Pan Twardowski (1874), which (in the musical arrangement first of Adolf Sonnenfeld and then of Ludomir Różycki) has for years been part of the ballet company's repertoire.

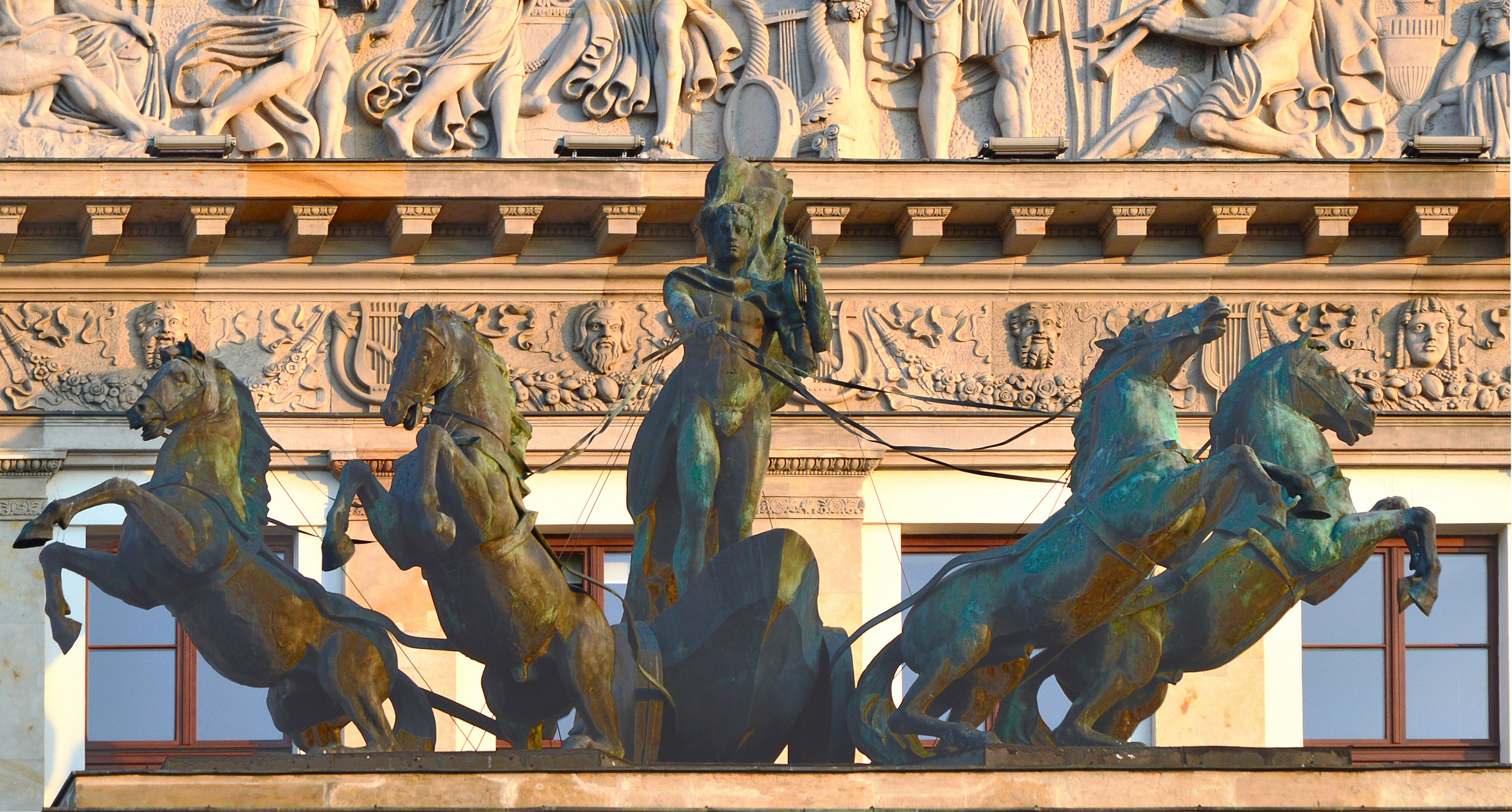
Apollo's quadriga

During the 1939 battle of Warsaw, the Grand Theatre was bombed and almost completely destroyed, with only the classical façade surviving. During the Warsaw Uprising of 1944 the Germans shot civilians in the burnt-out ruins. The plaque to the right of the main entrance commemorates the suffering and heroism of the victims of fascism.

=== Building's restoration ===
Between 1945 and 1965, the company performed on other stages while the theatre building was being restored and expanded to the designs of Bohdan Pniewski, under the supervision of Arnold Szyfman. When the restored theatre was opened to the public on November 19, 1965, it was one of the most imposing and best-equipped state-of-the-art theatres in Europe. The Polish National Opera was the largest theatre in the world.

=== Completion of façade ===
According to Antonio Corazzi's 1825 plans, the Grand Theatre's front façade was meant to feature a triumphal sculpture of Apollo, patron of the arts, driving a chariot drawn by four horses. However, the defeat of the November Uprising caused the idea to be abandoned. The platform above the main entrance meant for the quadriga remained empty for nearly 200 years.

Finally, in 2002, at the initiative of the Grand Theatre's then-general director, Waldemar Dąbrowski, the sculpture that had been envisioned many years earlier came to adorn the façade. The new, contemporary quadriga was designed by professors at the Warsaw Academy of Fine Arts, the rector, Adam Myjak, and the dean of the sculpture department, Antoni Janusz Pastwa. The sculpture was unveiled by Polish President Aleksander Kwaśniewski on May 3, 2002, to mark Constitution Day.

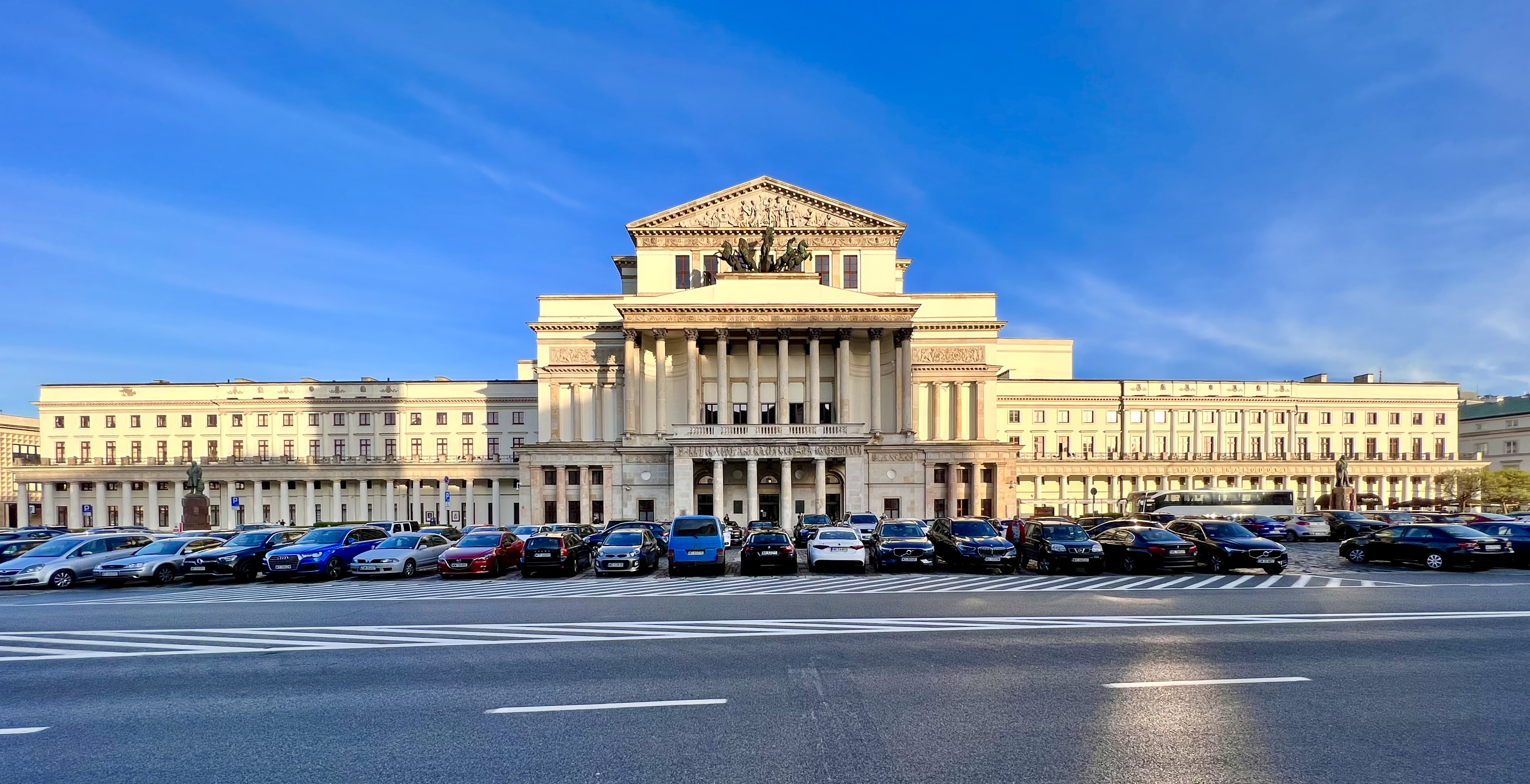
Grand Theatre Warsaw, frontal view (2022)

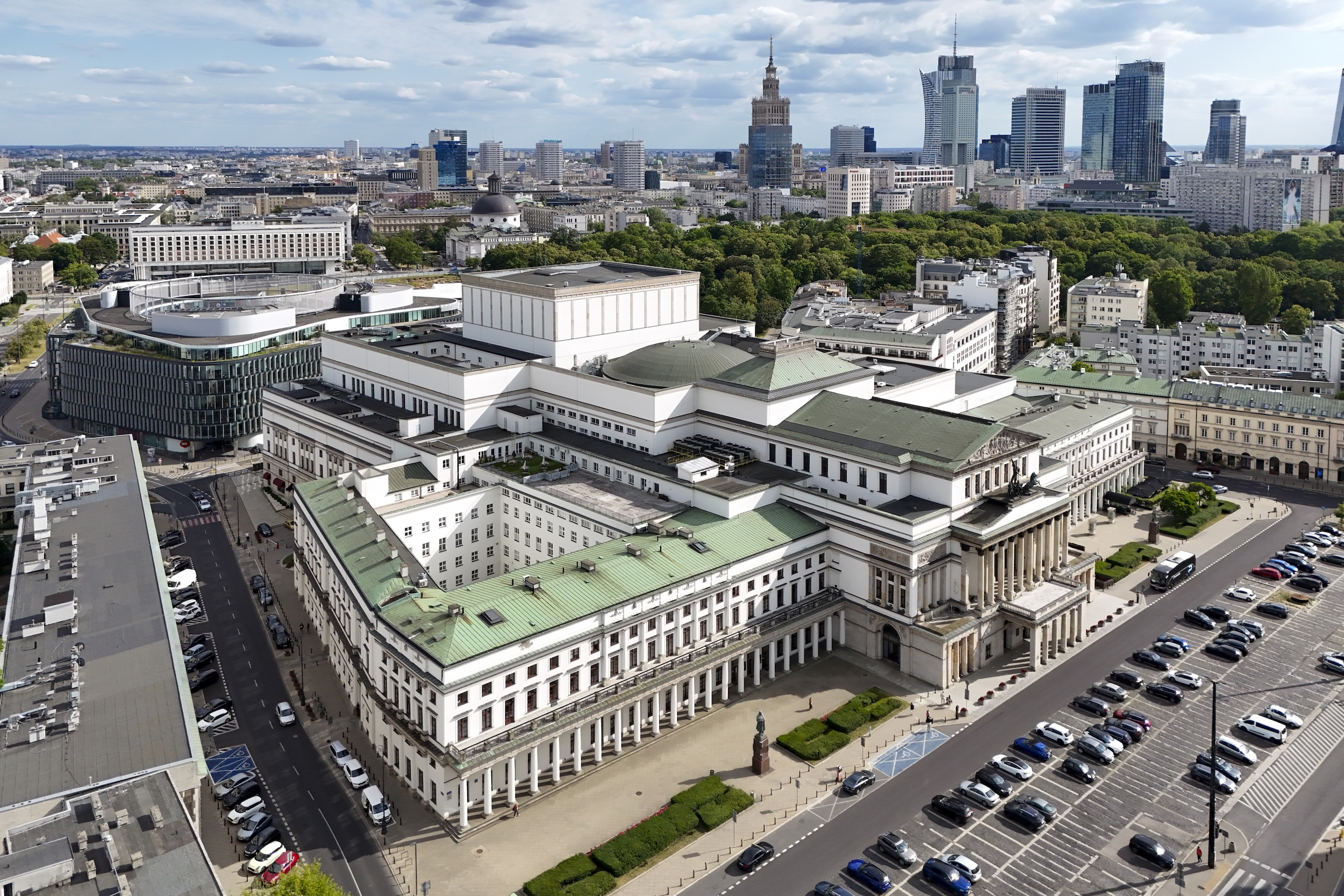
Grand Theatre Warsaw, aerial view (2025)

Moniuszko Hall

=== The Company today ===
For over 170 years the Grand Theatre (now "the Grand Theatre and Polish National Opera") has been Poland's grandest opera and ballet institution.

- Opera: The Polish National Opera at the Grand Theatre continues its 200-year tradition, producing works by Polish composers from Karol Kurpiński, through Stanisław Moniuszko, to Krzysztof Penderecki. However, classic operas are also well represented: the company's repertoire includes the best operas by the major figures of opera, past and present.
- Ballet: Polish National Ballet (formerly Ballet of Teatr Wielki - Opera Narodowa) has worked with major international figures in the world of ballet as well as with many Polish choreographers, such as Leon Woizikovsky, Stanisław Miszczyk, Witold Gruca and Emil Wesołowski. Currently, works under direction of Krzysztof Pastor.

The 2023 International Opera Awards took place at the Grand Theatre.

== Facilities at the National Opera ==
The National Opera features two auditoriums and a museum:

- The Stanisław Moniuszko Auditorium, which seats 1,841, is the primary venue for opera, ballet and theatre performances, which run annually from September through June/July.
- The Emil Młynarski Auditorium seats 248.
- The Theatre Museum, accommodated in former main-floor ballrooms, is the country’s sole theatre museum.

Before the building stand two statues by Jan Szczepkowski, of Wojciech Bogusławski, the father of Polish National Theatre, and of Stanisław Moniuszko, the father of Polish National Opera.

== See also ==
- Irene Adler
- List of opera houses
- Marywil
- Stanisław Moniuszko
- Wojciech Bogusławski
