= Jabłonowski Palace =

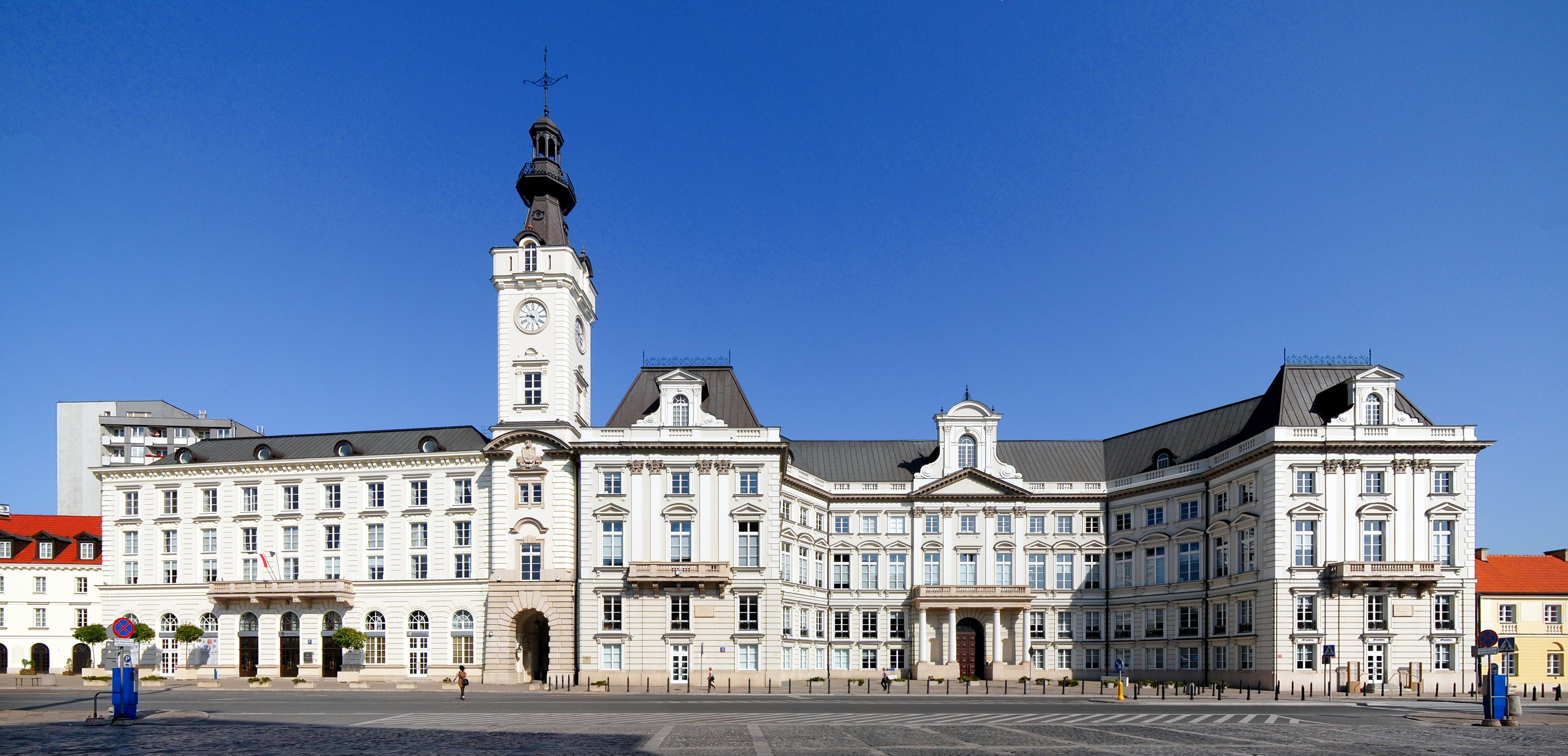
- Pałac Jabłonowskich

- Location within Poland

General information
- Architectural style: Renaissance Revival
- Location: Warsaw, Poland
- Coordinates: 52°14′41″N 21°0′35″E
- Construction started: 1773
- Completed: 1785
- Destroyed: 1944

Design and construction
- Architects: Jakub Fontana and Dominik Merlini, 1773-85; Józef Orłowski, 1864-69

Other information
- Public transit: Ratusz Arsenał

The Jabłonowski Palace (Polish: Pałac Jabłonowskich) is a historic palace on Theatre Square in the Downtown (Śródmieście) district of Warsaw, Poland. Prior to World War II, the palace served as the Warsaw city hall.

== History ==
The Jabłonowski Palace was built in 1773-85 for Antoni Barnaba Jabłonowski by Jakub Fontana and Dominik Merlini. In 1817-19 it was reconstructed to serve as the Warsaw city hall, replacing the dismantled old city hall. In 1863 the building was damaged by a fire set by demonstrating Polish patriots during the January 1863 Uprising.

In 1864-69 the building was reconstructed in a Neo-Renaissance style. At that time, the characteristic tower was added.

During the 1939 Invasion of Poland, the city hall served as headquarters of Warsaw's civil defense. During the 1944 Warsaw Uprising, the German forces destroyed the building. In 1952-58 the city hall's debris was cleared.

In the 1990s the building was rebuilt to pre-1936 architectural plans and became the seat of Bank Handlowy and BRE Bank. The palace's overall shape, including tower and façade, is prewar. Some features were, however, built in contemporary style.
