= Yuka Ebihara =

Japanese ballet dancer

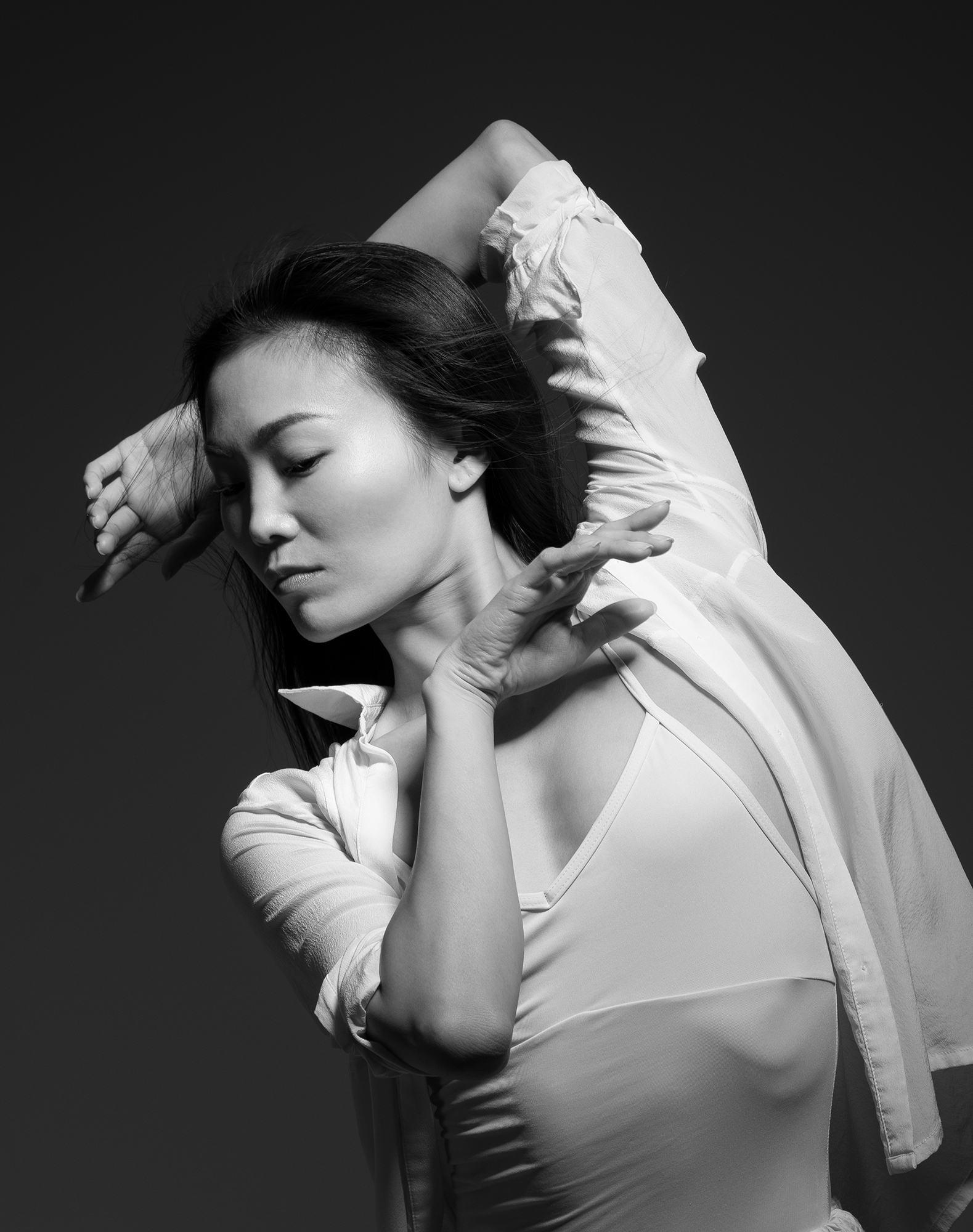
Yuka Ebihara

Yuka Ebihara (Japanese: 海老原由佳, Ebihara Yuka; born 22 October 1986 in Tokyo, Japan) is a Japanese ballet dancer. Since September 2011, she has been engaged with Warsaw's Teatr Wielki. Since September 2013, she became a first soloist, and since January 2020 she is a principal dancer of the Polish National Ballet. She ended her stage career on December 22, 2024, saying goodbye to the Warsaw audience in the role of Marguerite Gautier in John Neumeier's The Lady of the Camellias.

== Artistic career ==
=== Beginnings ===
Ebihara took up dancing as a 7-year-old in Beijing, where she lived with her family as her father had a temporary working contract. Since 1997, she had continued her training in Iwata Ballet School in Yokohama, and then 2005 in Goh Ballet Academy in Vancouver, Canada. After finishing her training in 2008, she became a soloist of Goh Ballet Youth Company. After one year of dancing with the company, she started to seek her place elsewhere. She was engaged with Norwegian National Ballet, Oslo (2008–2009), performed as a guest dancer with the company of Vienna Festival Ballet in Great Britain (2008), was a soloist with French Compagnie Mezzo Ballet (2009), and danced with the Suzanne Farrell Ballet, USA (2009). Then, for two years (2009–2011), she was engaged as a soloist of Croatian National Theatre, Zagreb, where she discovered the Polish National Ballet – a newly created company in Warsaw's Teatr Wielki under the direction of Krzysztof Pastor – was looking for dancers.

=== In Poland ===
In 2011, Ebihara went through audition to Polish National Ballet, and she got a contract. She began as a corps de ballet dancer, but in only 2 years she was promoted twice and in 2013 she became a first soloist, which is the highest rank in the company's structure. In a very short time, she took over many roles in the company's repertoire and began to represent Polish National Ballet on international ballet galas in USA, Russia, Japan, Spain, Netherlands, Sweden, Norway, Germany, Czech, Lithuania and Latvia.

== Major achievements ==
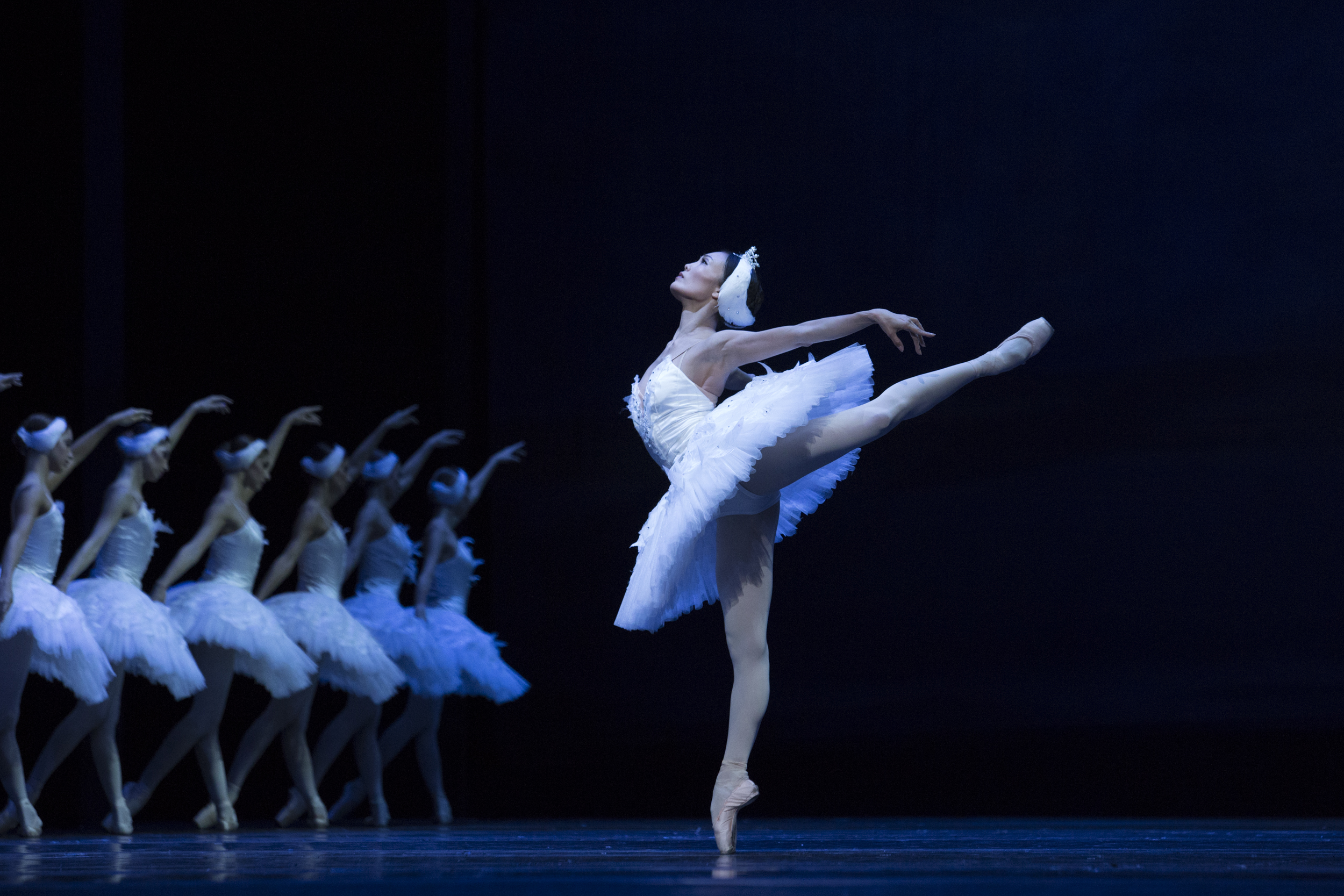
Yuka Ebihara as Odetta in Swan Lake by Krzysztof Pastor after Lev Ivanov

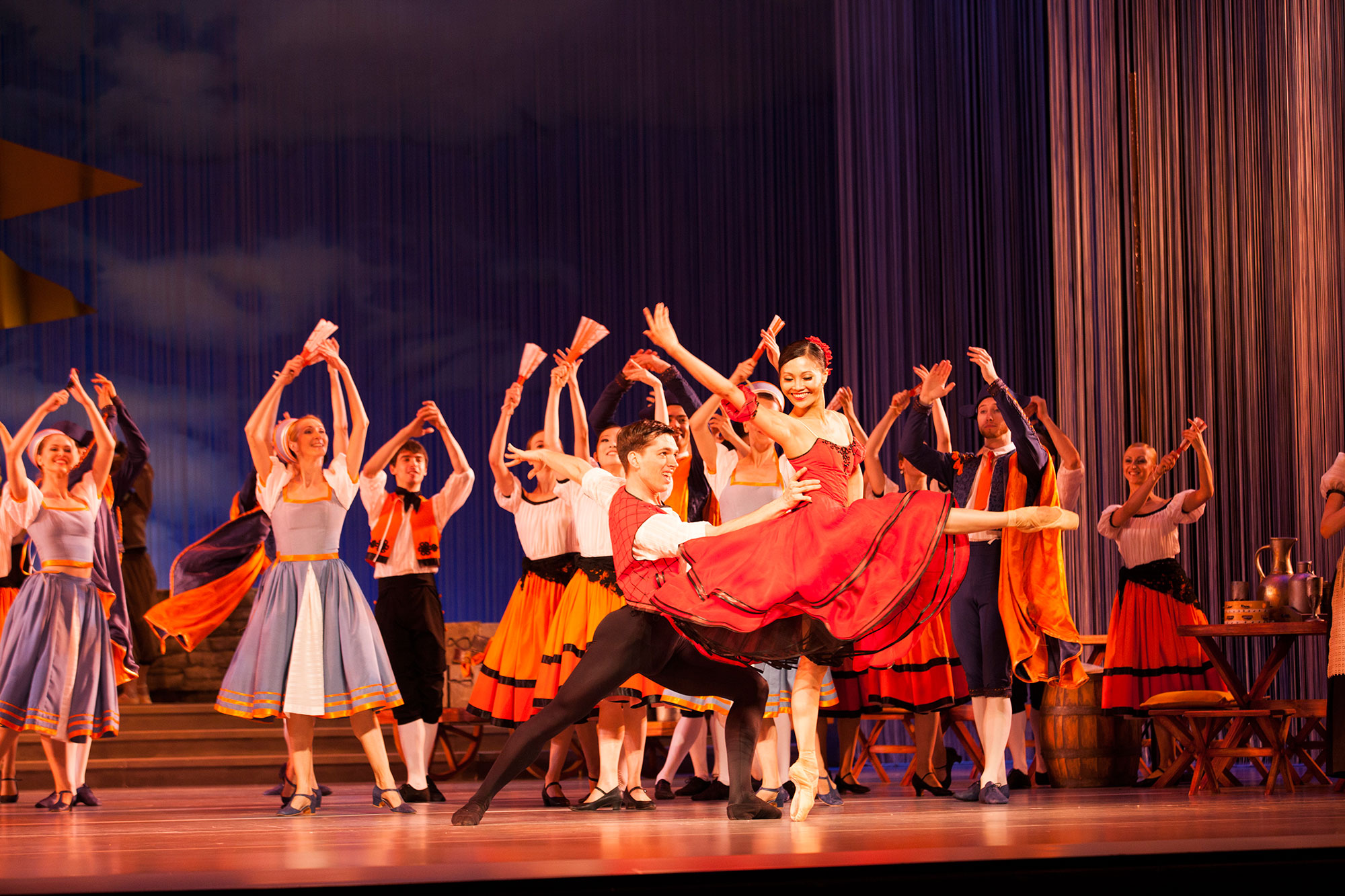
Yuka Ebihara as Kitri and Paweł Koncewoj as Basilio in Don Quixote by Alexei Fadeyechev after Marius Petipa

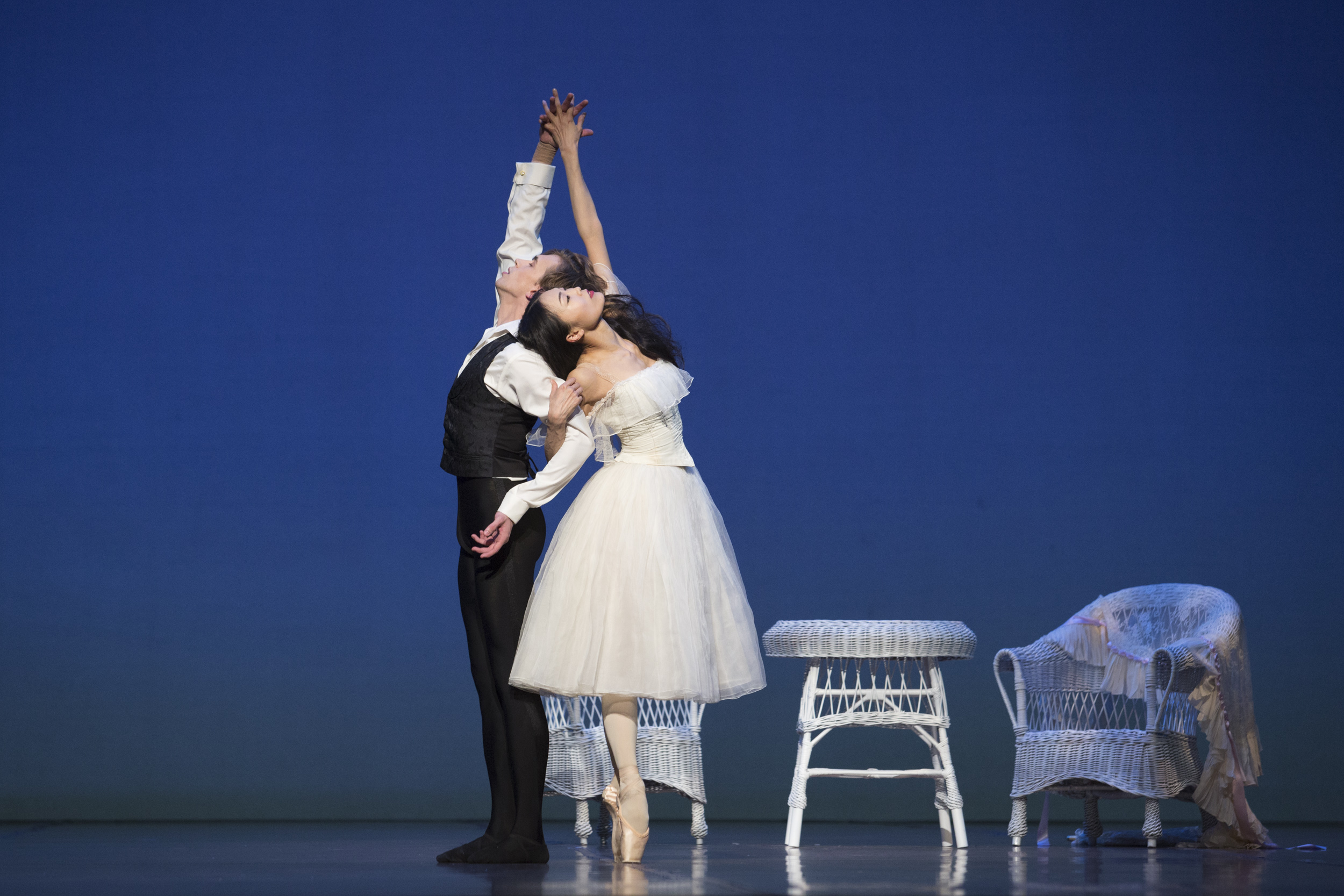
Yuka Ebihara as Marguerite Gautier and Patryk Walczak as Armand Duval in The Lady of the Camellias by John Neumeier

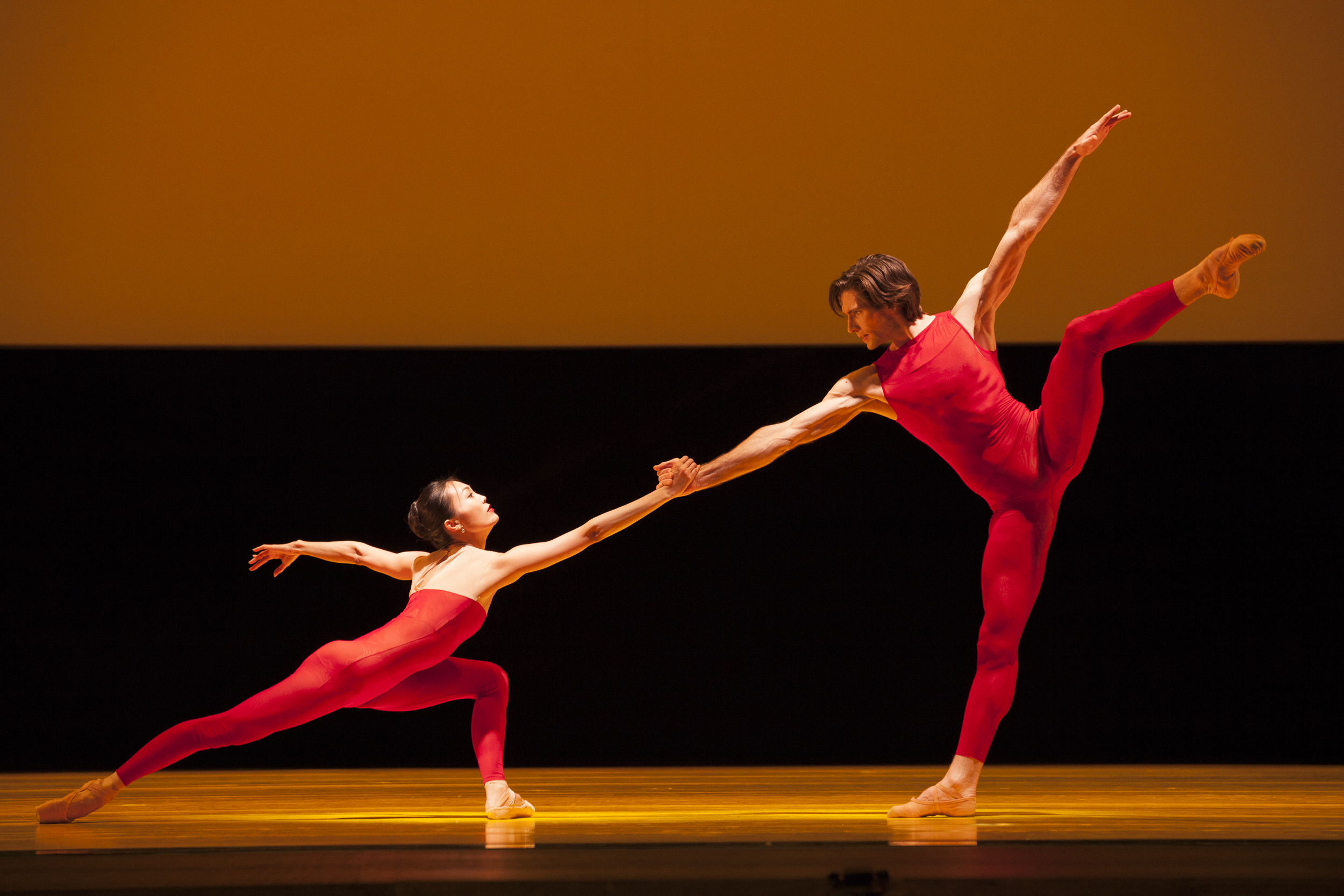
Yuka Ebihara and Vladimir Yaroshenko in Bolero by Krzysztof Pastor

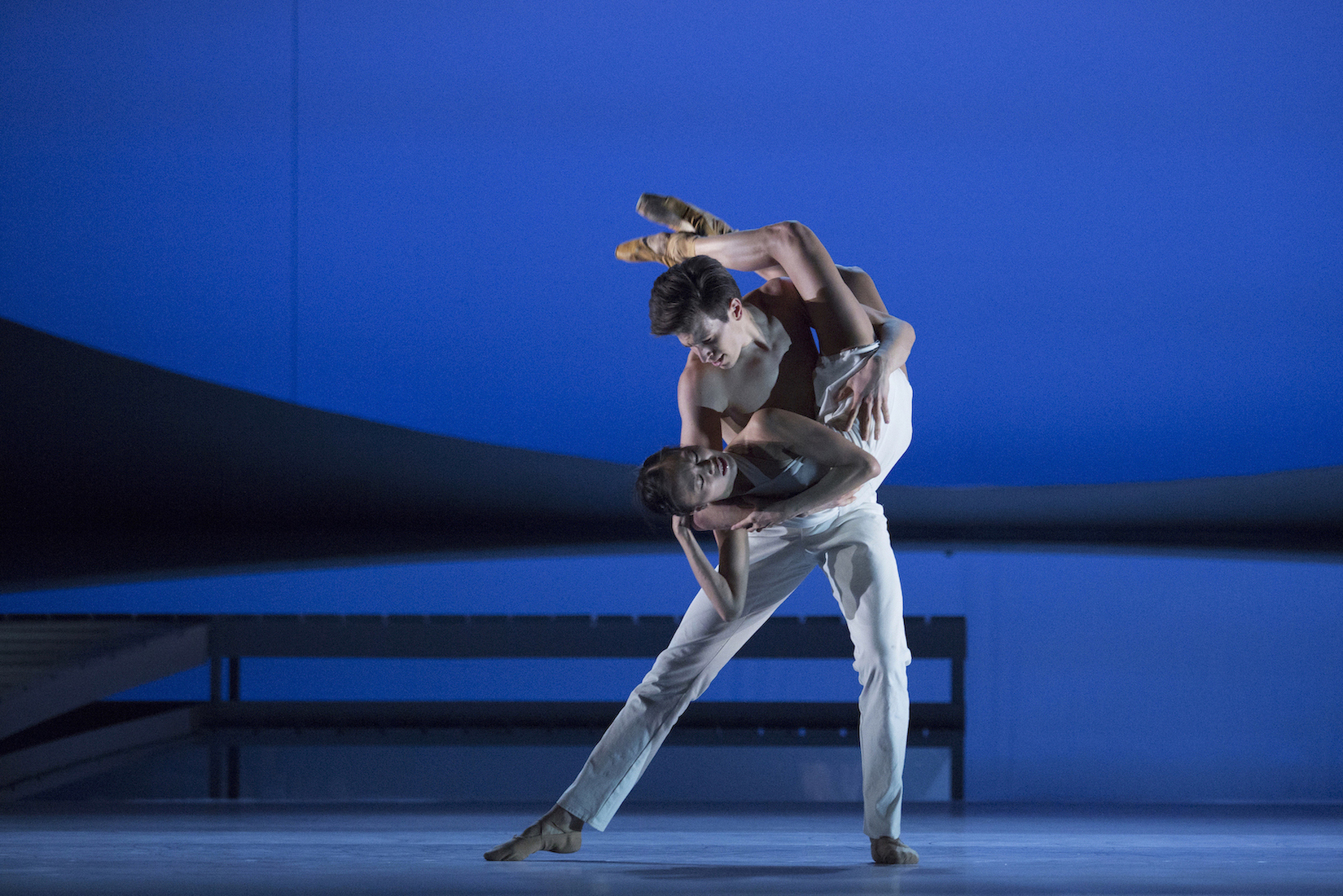
Yuka Ebihara and Kristóf Szabó in Świtezianka by Robert Bondara

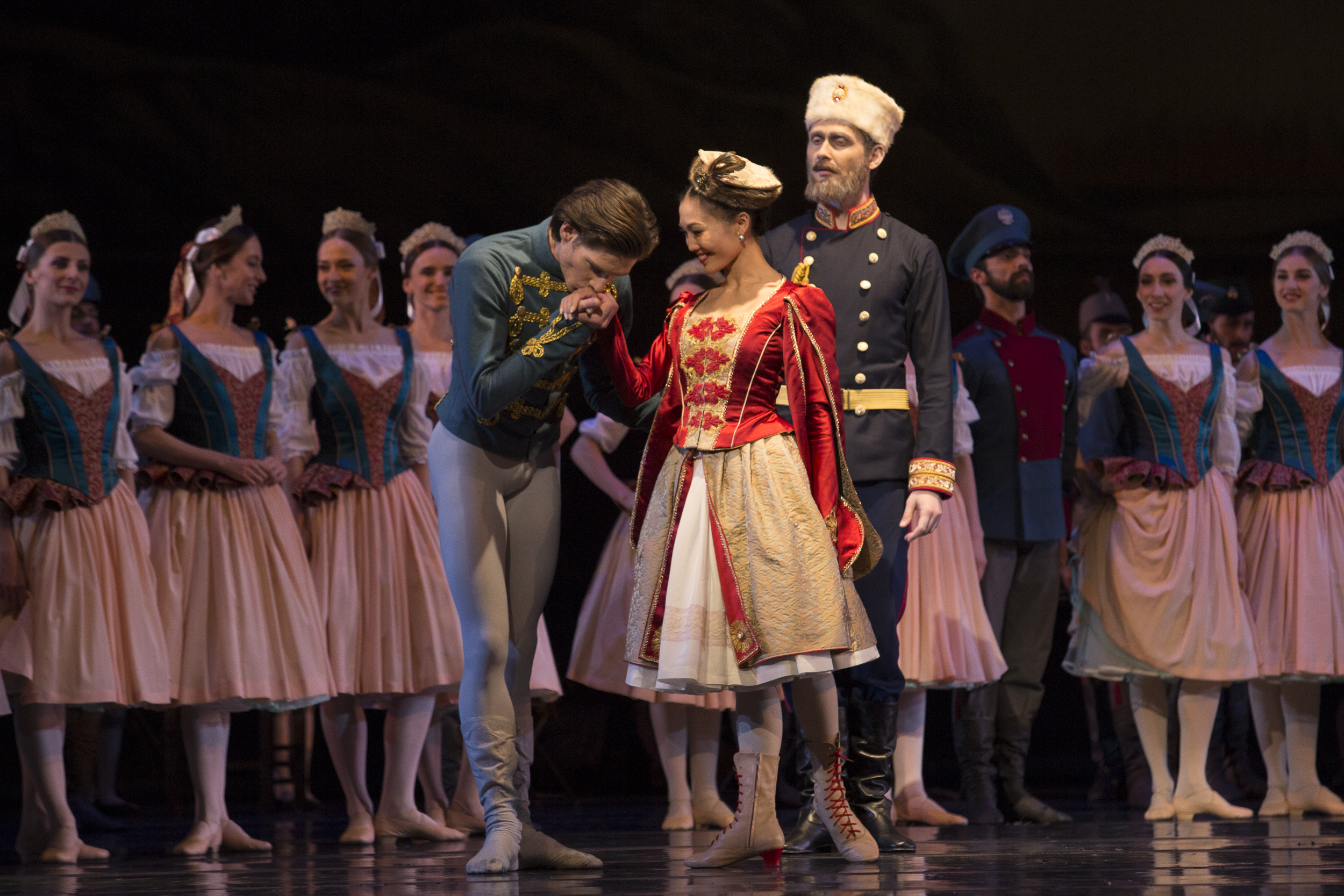
Yuka Ebihara as Mathilde Kschessinska, Vladimir Yaroshenko as Tsarevich Nicky and Robert Bondara as Tsar Alexander in Swan Lake by Krzysztof Pastor

=== Overseas ===
- Giselle – Giselle by Choo-San Goh (Goh Ballet Youth Company)
- Sugar Plum Fairy – The Nutcracker by Choo-San Goh (Goh Ballet Youth Company)
- Soloist – Grand pas classique by Victor Gsovsky (Goh Ballet Youth Company)
- Odette-Odile – Swan Lake by Marius Petipa and Lev Ivanov (Vienna Festival Ballet)
- Swanilda – Coppélia by Christopher Lee Wright (Vienna Festival Ballet)
- Fairy of the Courage – The Sleeping Beauty by Emily Hufton (Vienna Festival Ballet)
- Duet – Dark Lines / Red Softness by Yannis Chevalier (Compagnie Mezzo Ballet)
- Kitri and Queen of Dryads – Don Quixote by Patrick Armand (Croatian National Theatre, Zagreb)
- Soloist and Duet – Concerto Barocco by George Balanchine (Croatian National Theatre, Zagreb)
- Princess Aurora – The Sleeping Beauty by Derek Dean (Croatian National Theatre, Zagreb)
- Main couple – Paquita by Derek Dean (Croatian National Theatre, Zagreb)
- Sugar Plum Fairy – The Nutcracker by Vaslav Orlikowsky (Croatian National Theatre, Zagreb)

=== With Polish National Ballet ===
- Gamzatti and Nikija – La Bayadère by Natalia Makarova
- Our-Strong Woman and Our-Other Girl – And the Rain Will Pass… by Krzysztof Pastor
- Principal Classic Seraphim – Six Wings of Angels by Jacek Przybyłowicz
- Fairy Autumn and Fairy Spring – Cinderella by Frederick Ashton
- Princess Florine – The Sleeping Beauty by Yury Grigorovich
- Duet 3 – Century Rolls by Ashley Page
- Duet 2 – Artifact Suite by William Forsythe
- Duet 2 i 1 – Moving Rooms by Krzysztof Pastor
- Clara – The Nutcracker and the Mouse King by Toer van Schayk & Wayne Eagling
- Siren – The Prodigal Son by George Balanchine
- Hippolyta-Titania – A Midsummer Night's Dream by John Neumeier
- Osilde – Tristan by Krzysztof Pastor
- First Soloist and Duet – Concerto Barocco by George Balanchine
- First Aria – In Light and Shadow by Krzysztof Pastor
- Duet – The Kisses by Emil Wesołowski
- Duet 2 – Adagio & Scherzo by Krzysztof Pastor
- Kitri-Dulcinea, Street Dancer and Queen of the Dryads – Don Quixote by Alexei Fadeyechev
- Julia – Romeo and Juliet by Krzysztof Pastor
- Mlle Gattai – Casanova in Warsaw by Krzysztof Pastor
- Katherina – The Taming of the Shrew by John Cranko
- Miranda – The Tempest by Krzysztof Pastor
- Soloist & Duet – Chopiniana by Mikhail Fokine
- Soloist – Chroma by Wayne McGregor
- Main Soloist – Bolero by Krzysztof Pastor
- Mathilde Kschessinska – Swan Lake by Krzysztof Pastor (with new libretto)
- Princess Alix-Odette – Swan Lake by Krzysztof Pastor (with new libretto)
- Świtezianka – Świtezianka by Robert Bondara
- Flute – On a Stave (Tansman's Sextuor) by Jacek Tyski
- Soloist – Szymanowski's Violin Concerto No. 2 by Jacek Przybyłowicz
- Marguerite Gautier – The Lady of the Camellias by John Neumeier
- Our Couple – And the Rain Will Pass… by Krzysztof Pastor
- Soloist – Chopins Concerto in E minor by Liam Scarlett
- The Reborn – Chopins Concerto in F minor by Krzysztof Pastor
- Princess Aurora – The Sleeping Beauty by Yury Grigorovitch
- Soloist – Infra by Wayne McGregor
- Médora – Le Corsaire by Manuel Legris
- Countess Marie Larisch – Mayerling by Kenneth MacMillan
- Mary Vetsera – Mayerling by Kenneth MacMillan
- Galina – Flights-Harnasie by Izadora Weiss
- Mina-Elisabeth – Dracula by Krzysztof Pastor
- Couple 2. – Grosse Fuge by Hans van Manen
- Leading couple – Eroica Variations by Ted Brandsen
- White Fairy – Pinocchio by Anna Hop
- Blue Fairy – Pinocchio by Anna Hop
- Solveig - Peer Gynt by Edward Clug
- Ingrid - Peer Gynt by Edward Grieg

== Awards ==
- 2003: First Prize & Scholarship, Ballet Competition, Yokohama, Japan
- 2006: First Prize & Scholarship, Surrey Festival of Dance, Surrey, Canada
- 2006: Senior Ballet Championships Winner & Most Outstanding Dance Award, British Columbia Provincials, Vancouver, Canada
- 2010: Gold Medal (category 22-28 years), International Competition of Ballet Dancers Mia Čorak Slavenska, Zagreb, Croatia
- 2014: Jan Kiepura Theatre Music Award for the best dancer in Poland
- 2017: Jan Kiepura Theatre Music Award for the best classical dancer in Poland
- 2019: Silver Medal for Merit to Culture ‘Gloria Artis’ in Poland
- 2024: Special Award for Dancer of the Polish National Ballet's 15th Anniversary

== Bibliography ==
- http://teatrwielki.pl/ludzie/yuka-ebihara/
- http://www.taniecpolska.pl/people/387
- http://www.encyklopediateatru.pl/osoby/71357/yuka-ebihara
- http://www.gala.pl/artykul/yuka-ebihara-wlasciwie-nie-wiem-gdzie-jest-moj-dom-170616011028
