= Vladimir Yaroshenko =

Polish-Russian ballet dancer

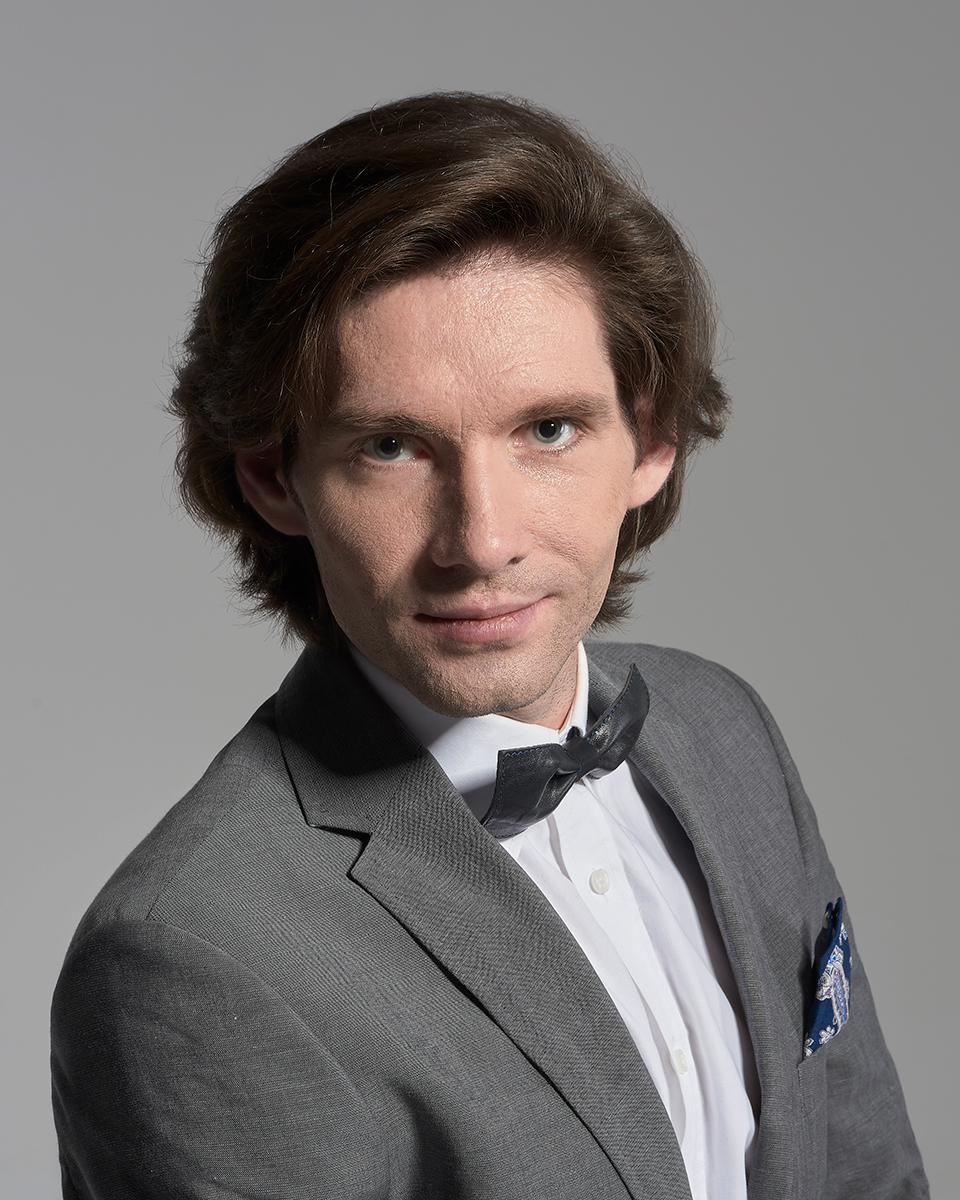
- Yaroshenko in 2017
- Born: November 2, 1985 (age 40); Slavyansk-na-Kubani, Krasnodar Krai, Russia
- Occupation: Principal dancer of the Polish National Ballet
- Spouse(s): Olga Yaroshenko, ballet dancer

Vladimir Yaroshenko (Russian: Владимир Ярошенко; born November 2, 1985, in Slavyansk-na-Kubani) – Polish-Russian ballet dancer in type danseur noble, first soloist with Yury Grigorovich's Ballet Theatre, Krasnodar, trained in classical Russian ballet school. Polish resident since 2007, engaged with Teatr Wielki, Warsaw, where since September 2010 is a first soloist, and since January 2020 - a principal dancer of Polish National Ballet under direction of Krzysztof Pastor.

== Russian beginnings ==
Yaroshenko, a son of Ludimla and Aleksandr Yaroshenko, was born in Slavyansk-na-Kubani in Krasnodar Krai on the Russian South. He takes up folk dance in children's dance company at the age of seven, and in 1998 begins his classical ballet training in Choreographic School in Krasnodar. As a 3ed grade student he takes over the part of the Mouse King in The Nutcracker by Yury Grigorovich in his Ballet Theatre, Krasnodar and takes part in theatre's shows ever since. In 2003, after graduating he gets his first professional contract with Ballet Theatre in Krasnodar, immediately as a soloist.

In Krasnodar, Yaroshenko worked under Yury Grigorovich's supervision for four years, and in this time, he took over main male roles in his versions of Romeo and Juliet, Swan Lake, Raymonda, Le Corsaire and Legend of Love. But it was main role in famous Ivan the Terrible premiere to bring him the first soloist position. He performed with Ballet Theatre, Krasnodar on many major stages in Russia but also in USA, Japan, Spain, Italy, France or Ukraine and Kazakhstan. In the same time, he managed to graduate in pedagogy of ballet on Krasnodar State University of Culture and Arts.

== In Poland ==
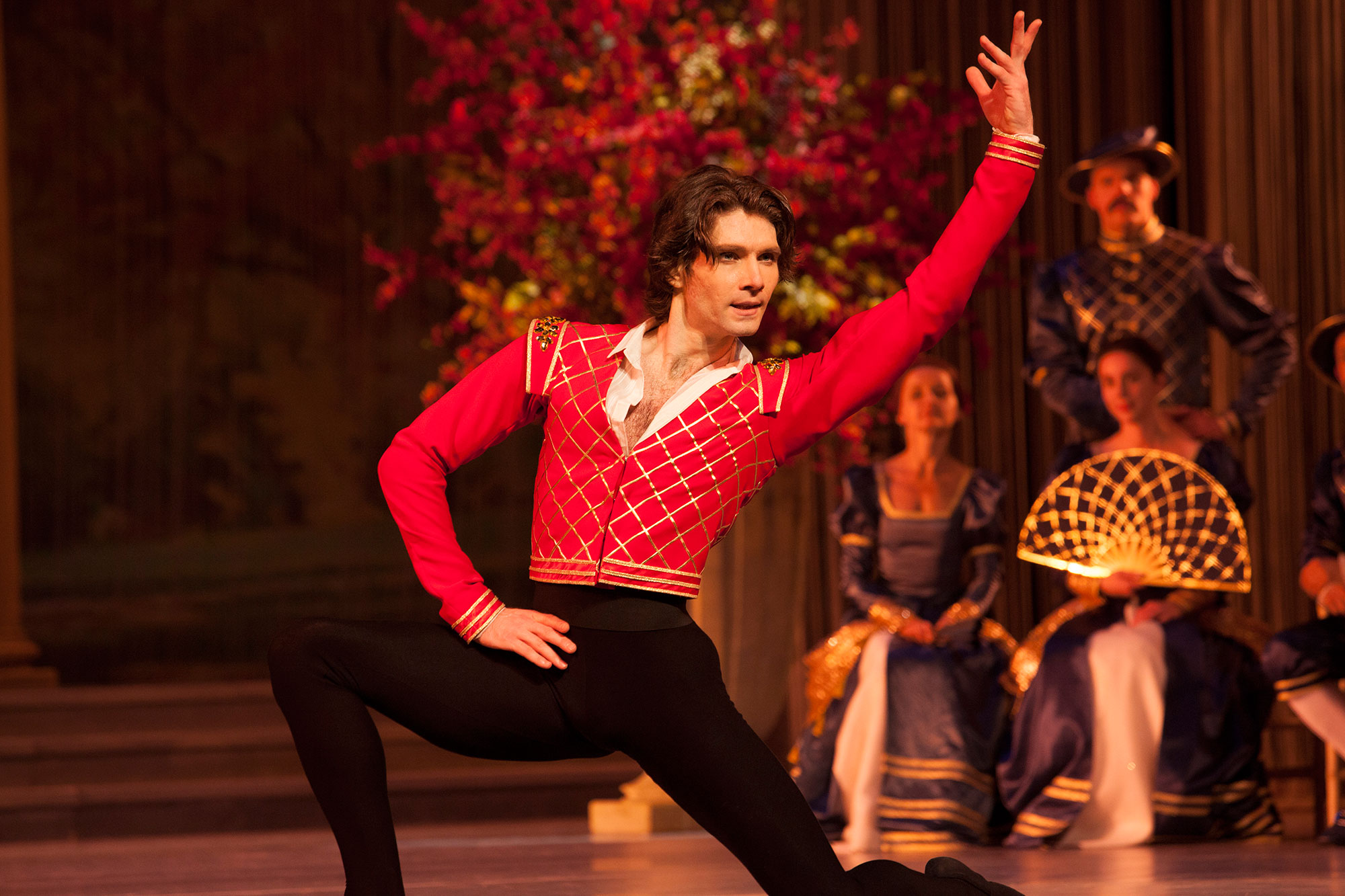
Vladimir Yaroshenko (Basilio) in Don Quixote by Alexei Fadeyechev after Marius Petipa

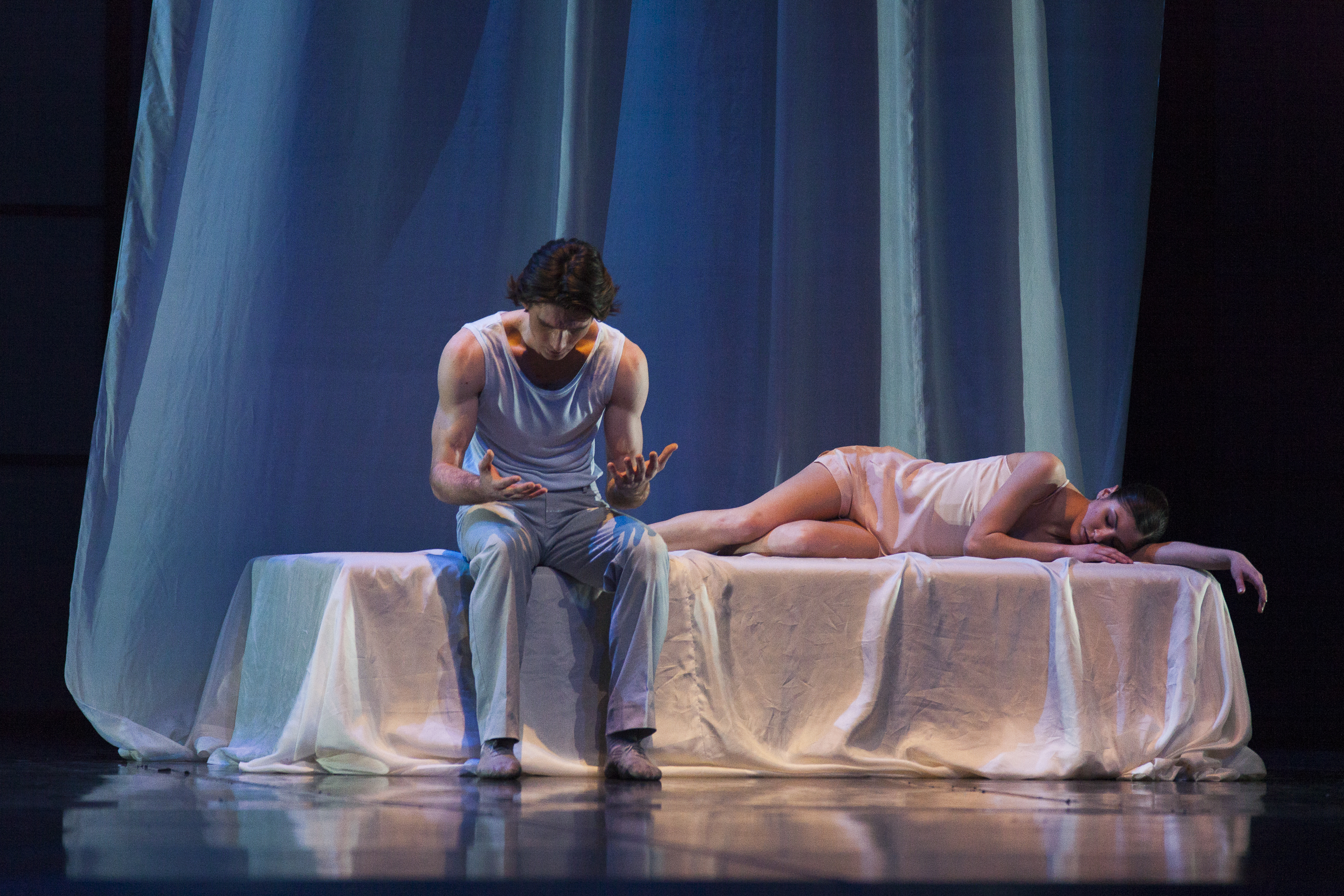
Vladimir Yaroshenko (Romeo) and Maria Żuk (Juliet) in Romeo and Juliet by Krzysztof Pastor

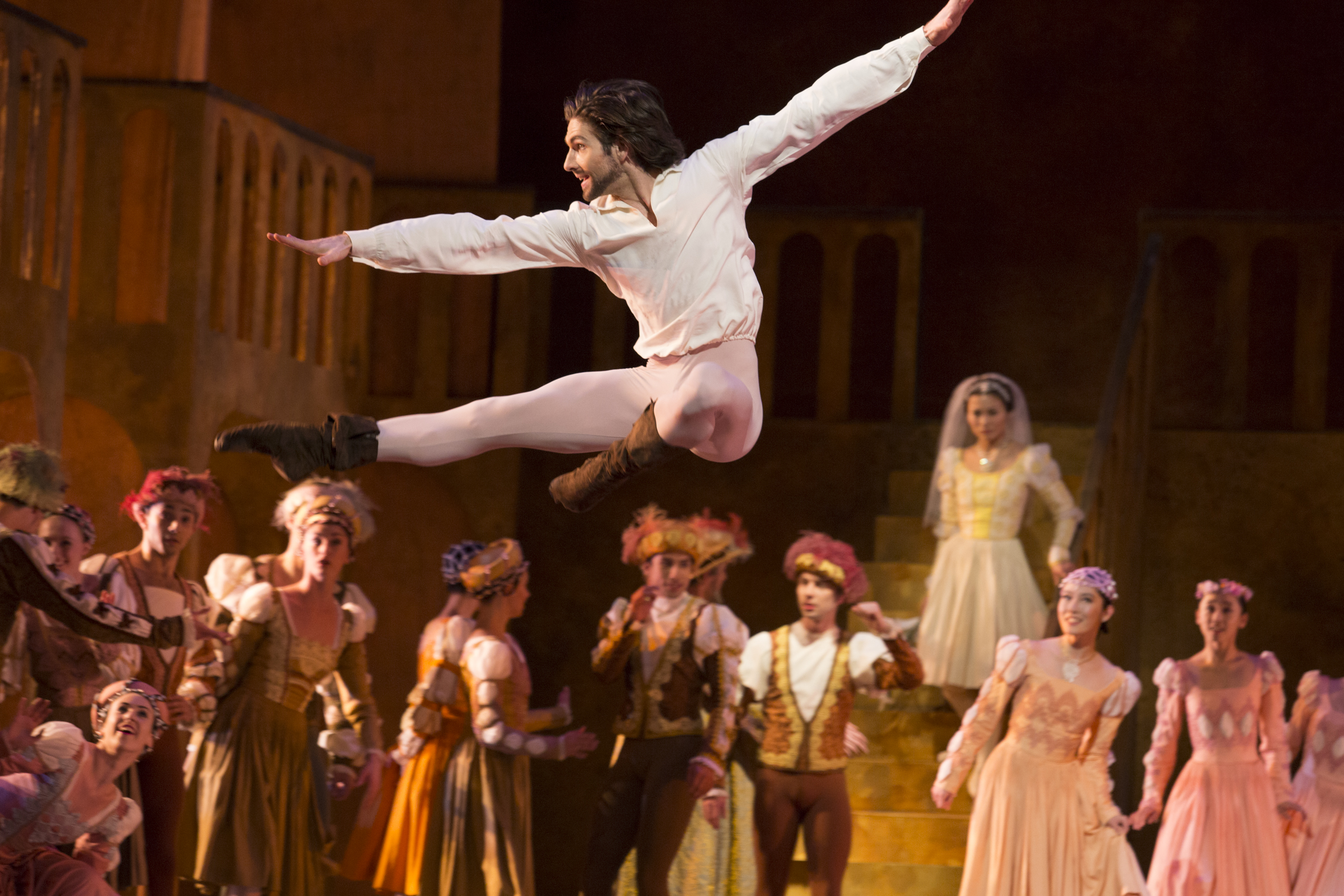
Vladimir Yaroshenko (Petruchio) in The Taming of the Shrew by John Cranko

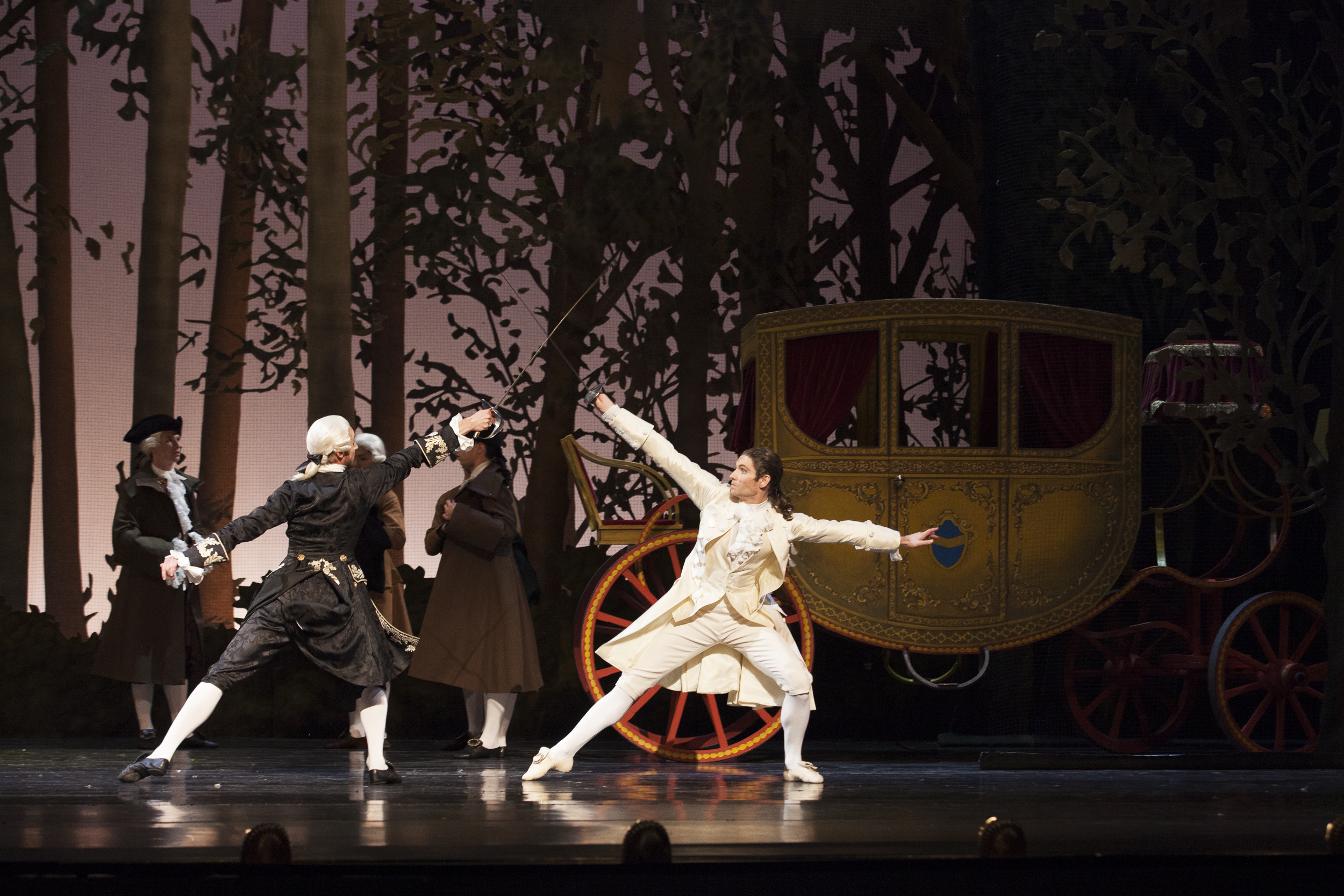
Vladimir Yaroshenko (Casanova) and Maksim Woitiul (Count Branicki) in Casanova in Warsaw by Krzysztof Pastor

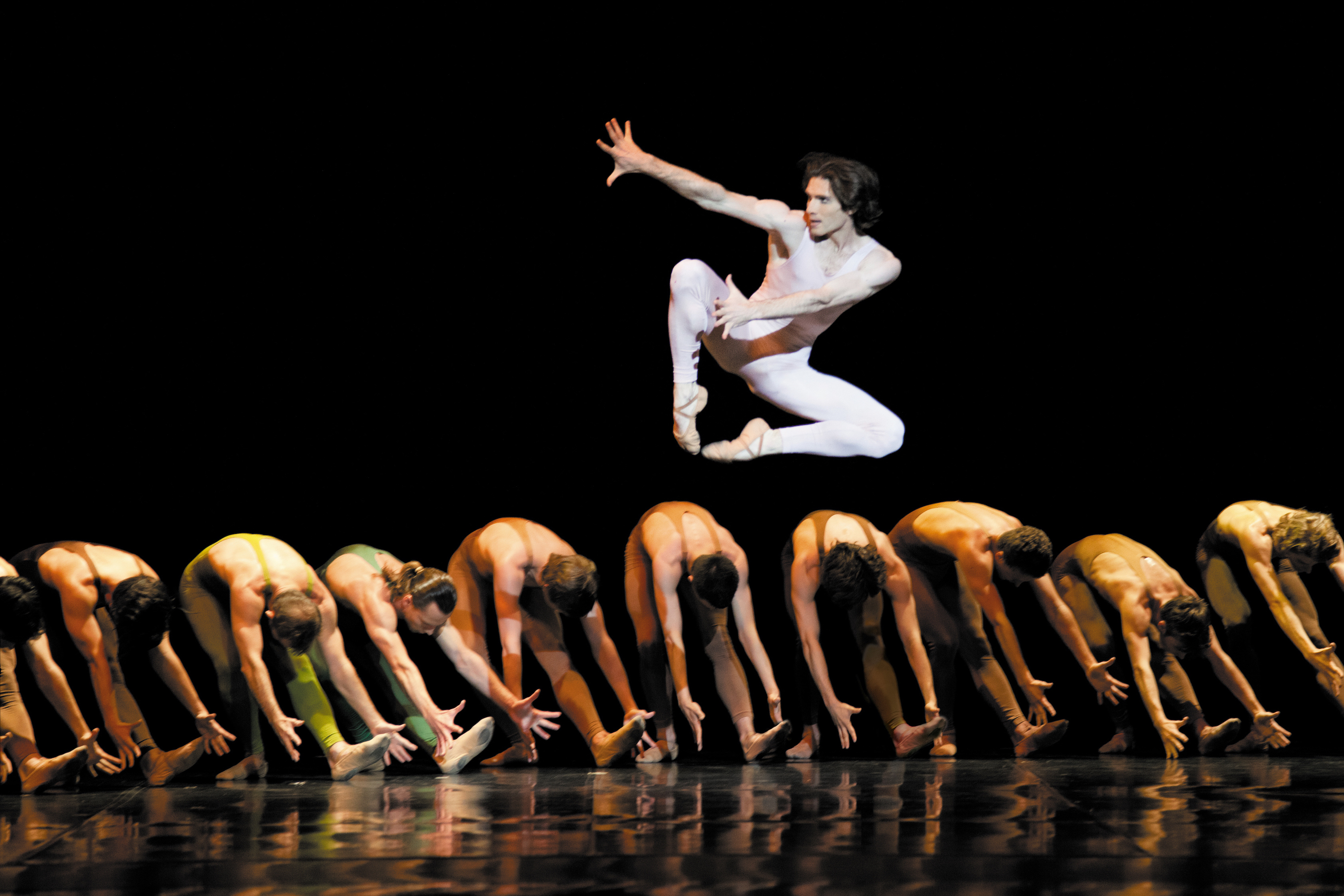
Vladimir Yaroshenko (The Chosen Man), Le Sacre du printemps by Maurice Béjart

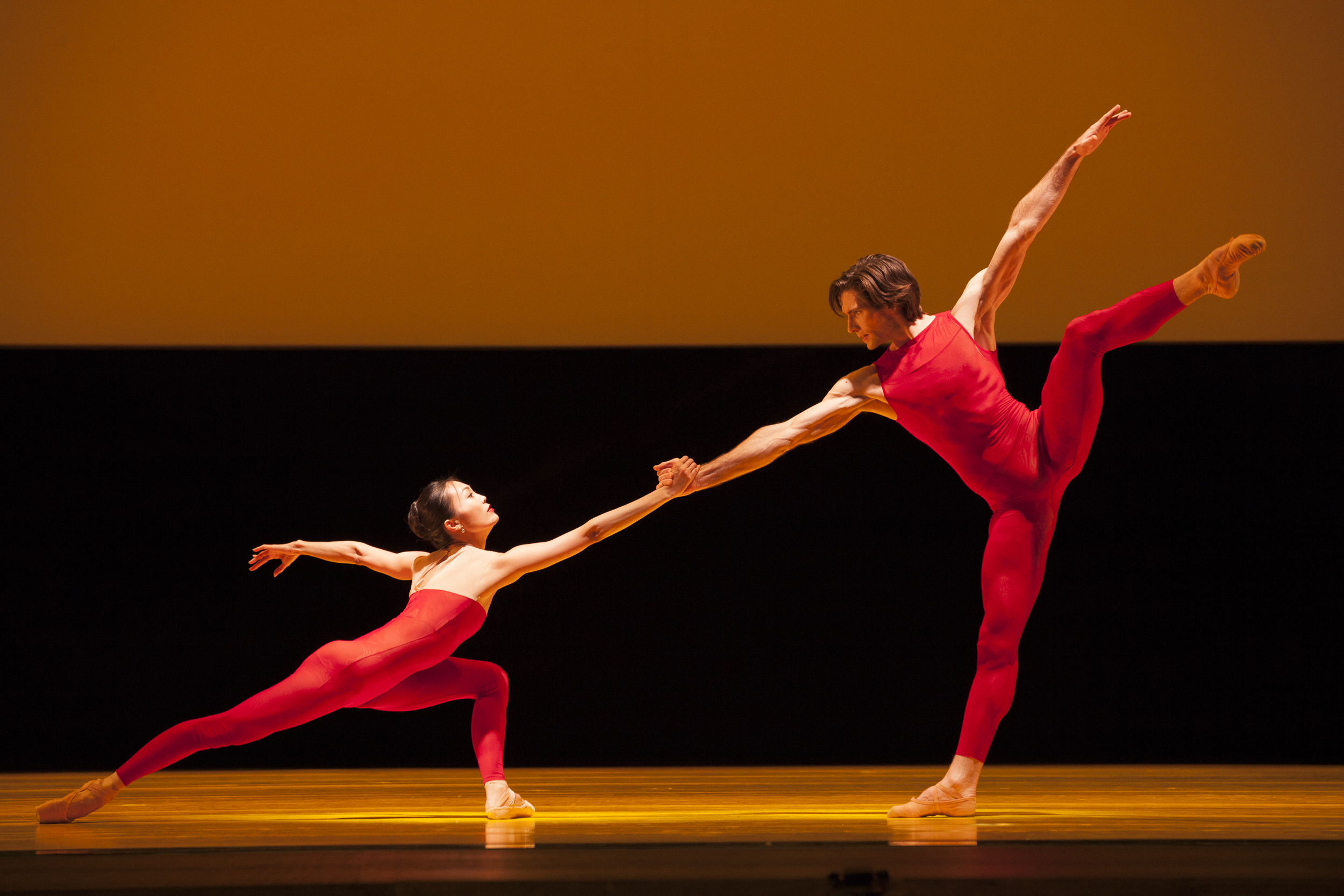
Vladimir Yaroshenko and Yuka Ebihara in Bolero by Krzysztof Pastor (2016)

Seeking for professional challenges other than Grigorovich's works, along with his wife Olga, who was also a dancer with the company, he decided to leave Krasnodar Ballet Theatre. At the invitation of his old teacher he moved to Lublin, Poland, where it was planned to create a new ballet company in Lublin Musical Theatre. He started working there since January 2007 bit soon it appeared that the plan failed, so he engaged with ballet company of Warsaw Teatr Wielki, under leadership of Jolanta Rybarska. In a short time, he took over main parts in The Nutcracker, Swan Lake, Romeo and Juliet and John Cranko's Oniegin. In 2009, when the company under direction of Krzysztof Pastor was elevated to the rank of Polish National Ballet, he was already a soloist and in September 2010 after Patrice Bart's premiere of Chopin the Romantic Artist he was promoted to first soloist. With Polish National Ballet, he performed in Saint Petersburg, Shanghai, Seville, Barcelona, Huston, New York, Washington, The Hague, Vilnius and Dubai. In 2015, he performed as Chopin (Chopin the Romantic Artist gala programme) in Belweder Palace and as Casanova (Casanova in Warsaw gala programme) in Presidential Palace during special ballet evenings hosted by presidential couple. Yaroshenko also takes part in international ballet galas in Japan, Spain, Sweden, Latvia, Czech Republic, Estonia, Georgia and Greece. In 2016, he took part in Hamburg Ballet's tour to Tokio, where he danced Theseus-Oberon in John Neumeier's A Midsummer Night’s Dream. He received the Jan Kiepura Theatre Music Award twice for best male dancer (2014) and best classical male dancer in Poland (2017 and 2022). In 2015, he and whole his family received Polish citizenship and in 2016 he was awarded by the Polish Minister of Culture and National Heritage the Bronze Medal for Merit to Culture ‘Gloria Artis’.

== Major achievements ==
=== Yury Grigorovich's Ballet Theatre, Krasnodar ===
- Prince Siegfried i Rothbart – Swan Lake by Yury Grigorovich
- Abderahman – Raymonda by Yury Grigorovich
- Romeo and Tybalt – Romeo and Juliet by Yury Grigorovich
- Birbanto – Le Corsaire by Yury Grigorovich
- Ferhad – Legend of Love by Yury Grigorovich
- Ivan IV – Ivan the Terrible by Yury Grigorovich

=== Teatr Wielki – Polish National Opera / Polish National Ballet ===
- Prince – The Nutcracker by Andrzej Glegolski
- Prince Siegfried – Swan Lake by Irek Mukhamedov
- Romeo and Tybalt – Romeo and Juliet by Emil Wesołowski
- Lenski – Oniegin by John Cranko
- Fryderyk Chopin – Chopin the Romantic Artist by Patrice Bart
- Prince Désiré and Blue Bird – The Sleeping Beauty by Yury Grigorovich
- Soloist – Concerto Barocco by George Balanchine
- Prince – Cinderella by Frederick Ashton
- New Orpheus and other solo parts – Kurt Weill by Krzysztof Pastor
- Our Man, the Spirit and the Ominous – And the Rain Will Pass by Krzysztof Pastor
- Chosen Man – Le Sacre du printemps by Maurice Béjart
- Prince and the Nutcracker – The Nutcracker and the Mouse King by Toer van Schayk and Wayne Eagling
- Solor and Golden Idol – La Bayadère by Natalia Makarova
- Kain and Abel – Kain and Abel by Emil Wesołowski
- Duet 1 – Moving Rooms by Krzysztof Pastor
- Duet 2 and Solo – Artifact Suite by William Forsythe
- Theseus-Oberon and Lysander – A Midsummer Night’s Dream by John Neumeier
- Hamlet, Leartes and Claudius – Hamlet by Jacek Tyski
- First Aria – In Light and Shadow by Krzysztof Pastor
- Romeo – Romeo and Juliet by Krzysztof Pastor
- Duet 2 – Adagio & Scherzo by Krzysztof Pastor
- Basilio and Espada – Don Quixote by Alexei Fadeyechev
- Soloist – Soldiers’ Mass by Jiří Kylián
- Standard-bearer – The Green Table by Kurt Jooss
- Casanova – Casanova in Warsaw by Krzysztof Pastor
- Petruchio and Hortensio – The Taming of the Shrew by John Cranko
- Prospero and Ferdinand – The Tempest by Krzysztof Pastor
- Soloist – Chroma by Wayne McGregor
- Main Soloist – Bolero by Krzysztof Pastor
- Tsarevich Nicky – Swan Lake (with new libretto) by Krzysztof Pastor
- Soloist – Szymanowski's Violin Concerto No. 2 by Jacek Przybyłowicz
- Tansman – On a Stave (Tansman's Sextuor) by Jacek Tyski
- The Reborn – Chopins Concerto in F minor by Krzysztof Pastor
- Armand Duval – The Lady of the Camellias by John Neumeier
- Cześnik / The Squire – Sarmatian Parable after Fredro's Zemsta by Conrad Drzewiecki / Emil Wesołowski
- Soloist – Do Not Go Gentle... by Krzysztof Pastor
- Soloist – Infra by Wayne McGregor
- Conrad – Le Corsaire by Manuel Legris
- Crown Prince Rudolf – Mayerling by Kenneth MacMillan
- Harnaś – Bieguni-Harnasie by Izadora Weiss
- Count Dracula – Dracula by Krzysztof Pastor
- Duke Albrecht – Giselle by Jean Coralli, Jules Perrot / Marius Petipa / Maina Gielgud
- Couple 4. – Grosse Fuge by Hans van Manen
- Leading couple – Seventh Symphony by Toer van Schayk
- Pinocchio 3. – Pinocchio by Anna Hop
- Death – Peer Gynt by Edward Clug
- Zeus – Prometheus by Krzysztof Pastor
- Principal in Adagio - Symphony in C by George Balanchine
- POL_3 [Pollux] – Androids by Robert Bondara
- Roger & Leonard – Delusions by Izadora Weiss

== Awards and state orders ==
- 2014: Jan Kiepura Theatre Music Award for the best dancer in Poland
- 2016: Bronze Medal for Merit to Culture ‘Gloria Artis’
- 2017: Jan Kiepura Theatre Music Award for the best classical dancer in Poland
- 2022: Jan Kiepura Theatre Music Award for the best classical dancer in Poland for the role of Crown Prince Rudolf in the ballet Mayerling by Kenneth MacMillan
- 2023: Union of Polish Stage Artists Award for 'Remarkable stage performances and outstanding achievements in the art of dance'
- 2024: Silver Medal for Merit to Culture ‘Gloria Artis’
- 2024: Special Award for Dancer of the Polish National Ballet’s 15th Anniversary
