= Krzysztof Pastor =

Polish dancer, choreographer and ballet director

Director of the Polish National Ballet Krzysztof Pastor
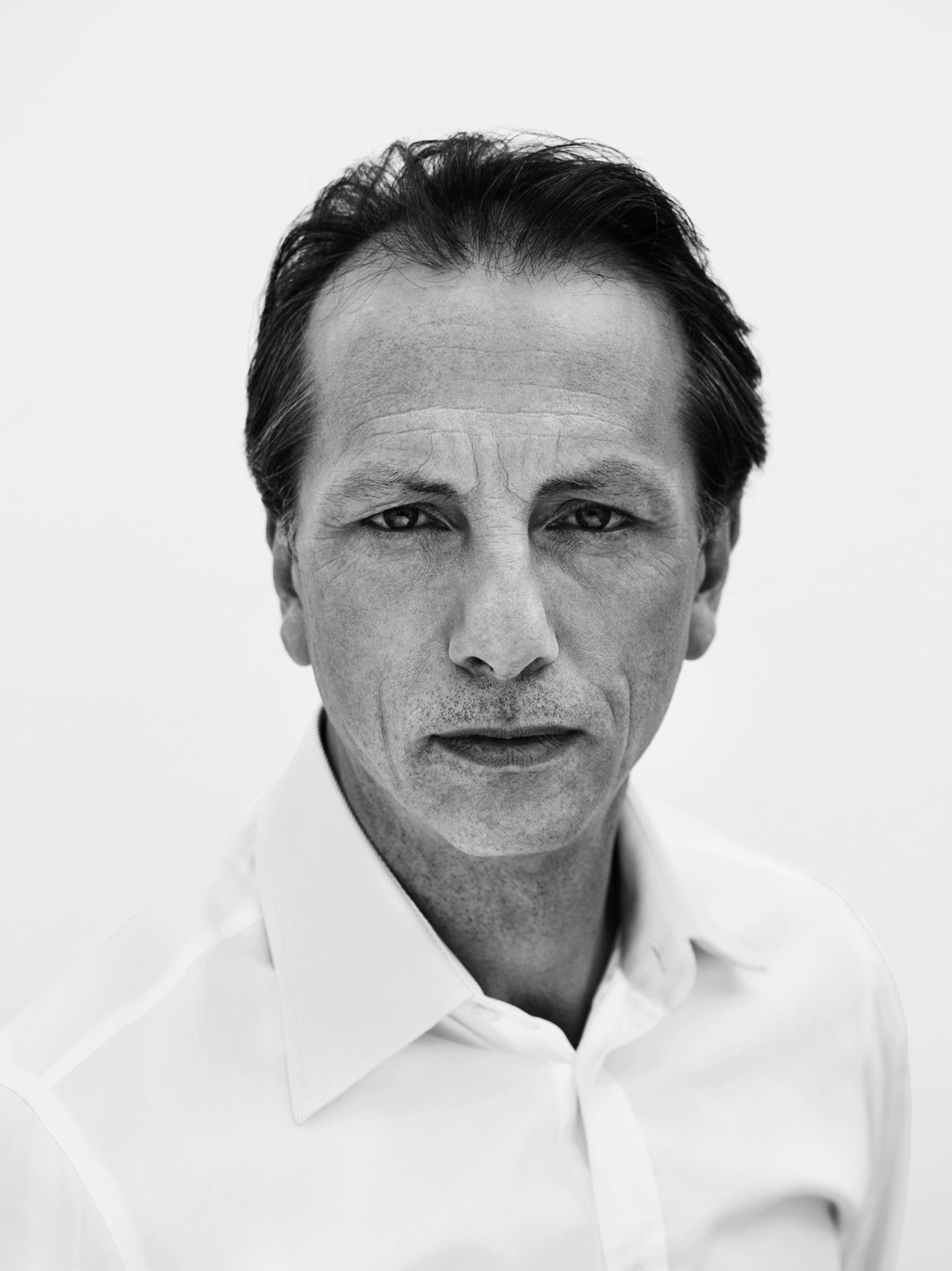
- Photo by Łukasz Murgrabia
- Born: 17 December 1956 (age 69); Gdańsk, Poland
- Occupations: Dancer, choreographer, ballet director
- Years active: 1975-present
- Notable work: In Light and Shadow (2000); Kurt Weill (2001); Tristan (2006); Romeo and Juliet (2008, with new libretto); Moving Rooms (2008); The Tempest (2014); Casanova in Warsaw (2015); Swan Lake (2017, with new libretto)
- Spouse(s): Simonetta Lysy, dancer, ballet mistress

Krzysztof Pastor (Polish pronunciation: [ˈkʐɨʂtɔf ˈpastɔr]; born 17 December 1956 in Gdańsk, Poland) is a Polish dancer, choreographer and ballet director. He was resident choreographer with the Dutch National Ballet in Amsterdam from 2003 to 2017, director of the Polish National Ballet in Teatr Wielki – Polish National Opera in Warsaw since 2009 and at the same time from 2011 until 2020 was the artistic director of the ballet of the Lithuanian National Opera and Ballet Theatre in Vilnius.

== Origins in Poland ==
Krzysztof Pastor was born in Gdańsk to a family of doctors - Jan and Leokadia Pastor. He trained with State Ballet School in Gdańsk 1966–1975. After his training, he joined the Polish Dance Theatre in Poznań, under direction of the Polish choreographer Conrad Drzewiecki, where in 1977 became a soloist and performed many roles in the company's repertoire. Between 1979 and 1982 was first soloist of the ballet of the Grand Theater in Łódź, where his repertoire included: Albrecht in Giselle, Prince in The Nutcracker, Armen in Boris Eifman’s Gayane, Vaslav w The Fountain of Bakhchisarai and Prince in Snow White. After imposition of martial law in Poland, he emigrated to the West in February 1982.

== Overseas achievements ==
In 1983, he became a soloist with Ballet de l'Opéra de Lyon, where he danced in ballets created by: Gray Veredon, Kurt Jooss, Antony Tudor, Hans van Manen, Maguy Marin, Nils Christe or Nacho Duato. From 1985 to 1995 was engaged with the Dutch National Ballet, under direction of Rudi van Dantzig. He danced many parts in his ballets (e.g. Mercutio in his Romeo and Juliet), but also in ballets by: George Balanchine, Bronislava Nijinska, Frederick Ashton, Hans van Manen, Toer van Schayk, Jan Linkens, Carolyn Carlson, Nina Wiener, Ted Brandsen or Ashley Page. He also danced in major classical ballets like The Sleeping Beauty (Bluebird) and Giselle (Hilarion) staged by Peter Wright or Swan Lake (Von Rothbart) choreographed by Rudi van Dantzig.

== Choreographer ==
In this period, he also took up an interest in choreographic work and since 1987 he was creating his pieces during choreographic workshops and on other occasions. Having some chamber achievements, in 1992 he received an offer to create his first major choreography for the Dutch National Ballet's repertoire. Then, he created Shostakovich Chamber Symphony, which was his official debut as a choreographer. In 1994, he made his Warsaw's debut on the stage of Teate Wielki – Polish National Opera choreographing Henryk Mikołaj Górecki’s Symphony No. 3. In 1995, he gained wider recognition during International Ballet Competition in Helsinki, Finland, where he received Gold Choreography Prize for his duet Detail IV to the music by Zoltán Kodály. Between 1997 and 1999 he was a resident choreographer with The Washington Ballet, and then he returned to the Dutch National Ballet, but this time as associate choreographer. In 2000, his Dutch achievements was awarded with Dansersfonds'79 Choreography Prize, and in 2002 his full-length ballet Kurt Weill received three nominations to international Prix Benois de la Danse (Moscow). Since 2003, he took over a prestigious position of the resident choreographer with the Dutch National Ballet. Ever since he shares this position with outstanding Dutch choreographer Hans van Manen. Most of Pastor’s ballets were created in Netherlands, but he was also invited by other ballet companies worldwide like: Australia, Belgium, Czech Republic, Hong Kong, Israel, Lithuania, Latvia, New Zealand, Germany, Sweden, Turkey, USA, Hungary, Great Britain and Italy. His works were successfully presented during Holland Festival, Holland Dance Festival, Edinburgh International Festival, Dance Salad Festival in Houston or International Ballet Festival "Dance Open" in St. Petersburg.

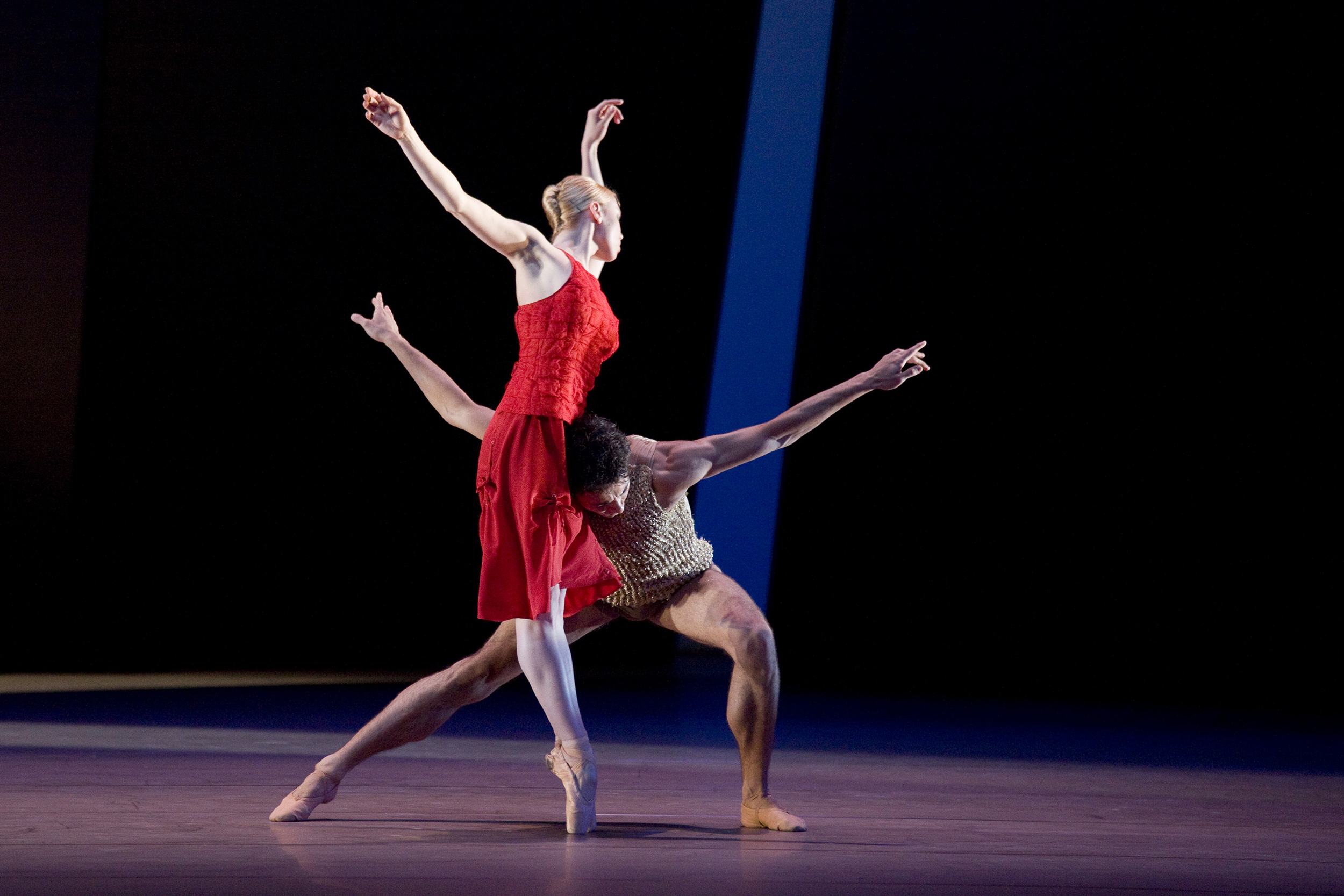
In Light and Shadow by Krzysztof Pastor, Polish National Ballet: Dagmara Dryl & Egor Menshikov

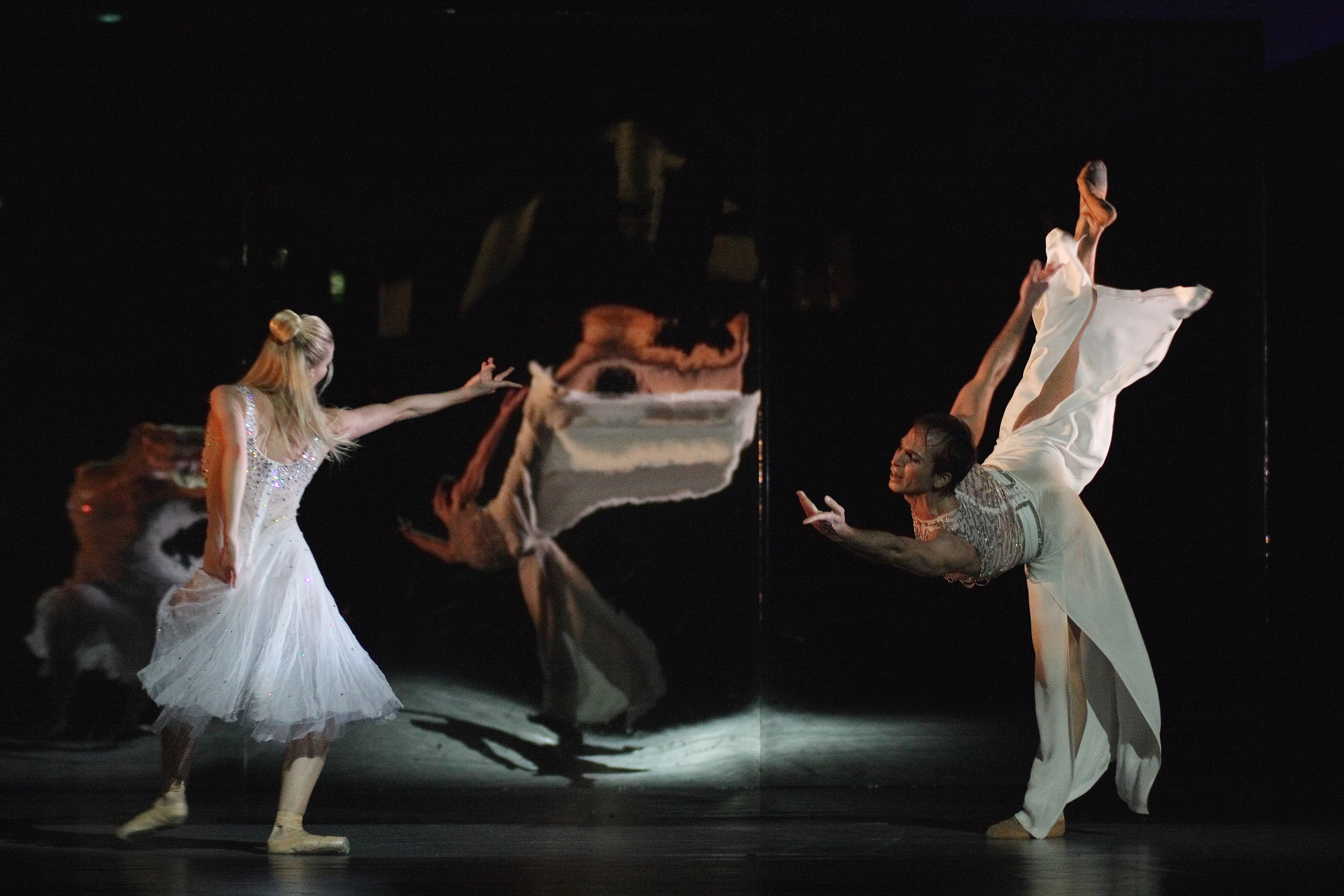
Tristan by Krzysztof Pastor, Polish National Ballet: Izabela Milewska & Jan-Erik Wikström

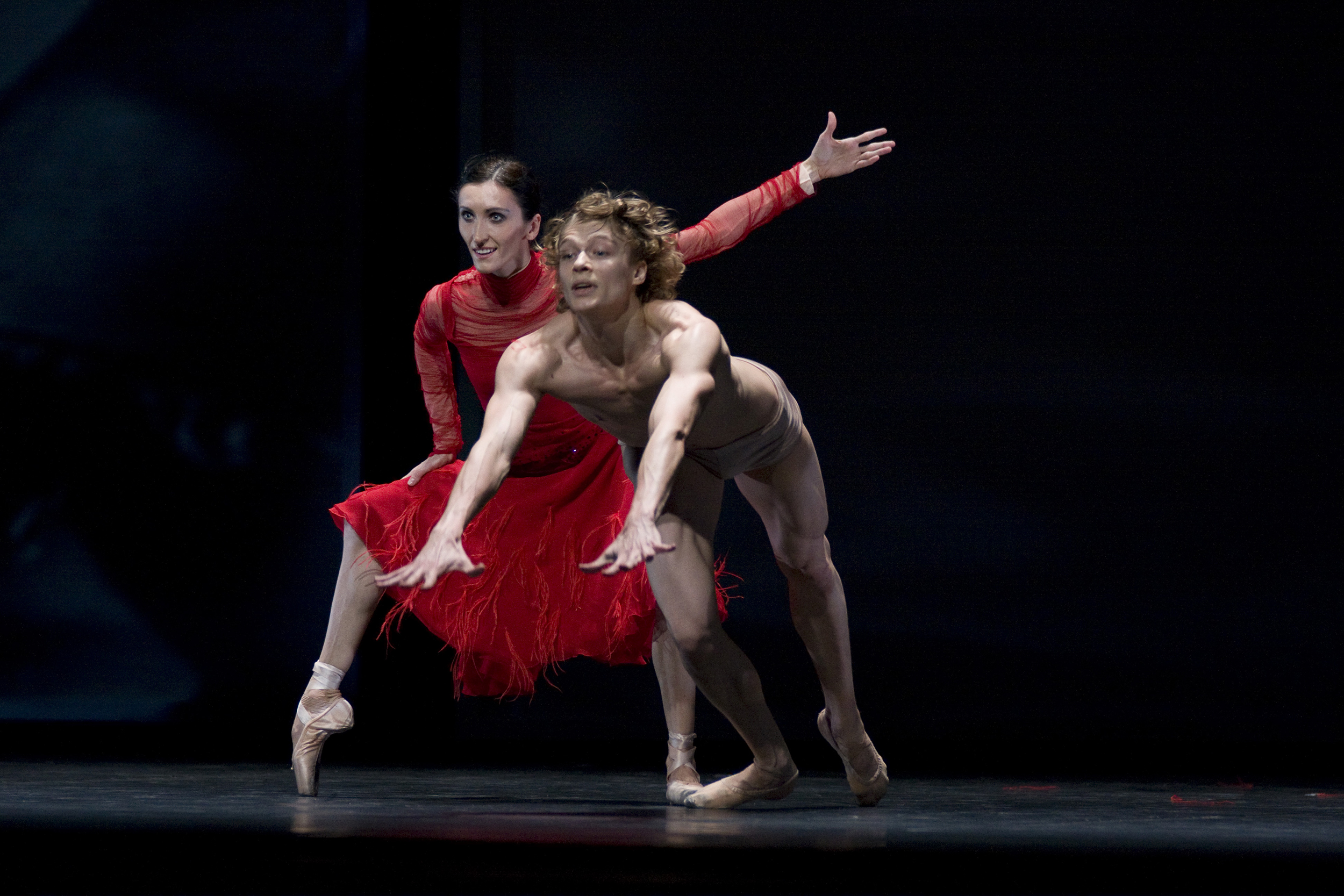
Kurt Weill by Krzysztof Pastor, Polish National Ballet: Dominika Krysztoforska & Sergey Popov

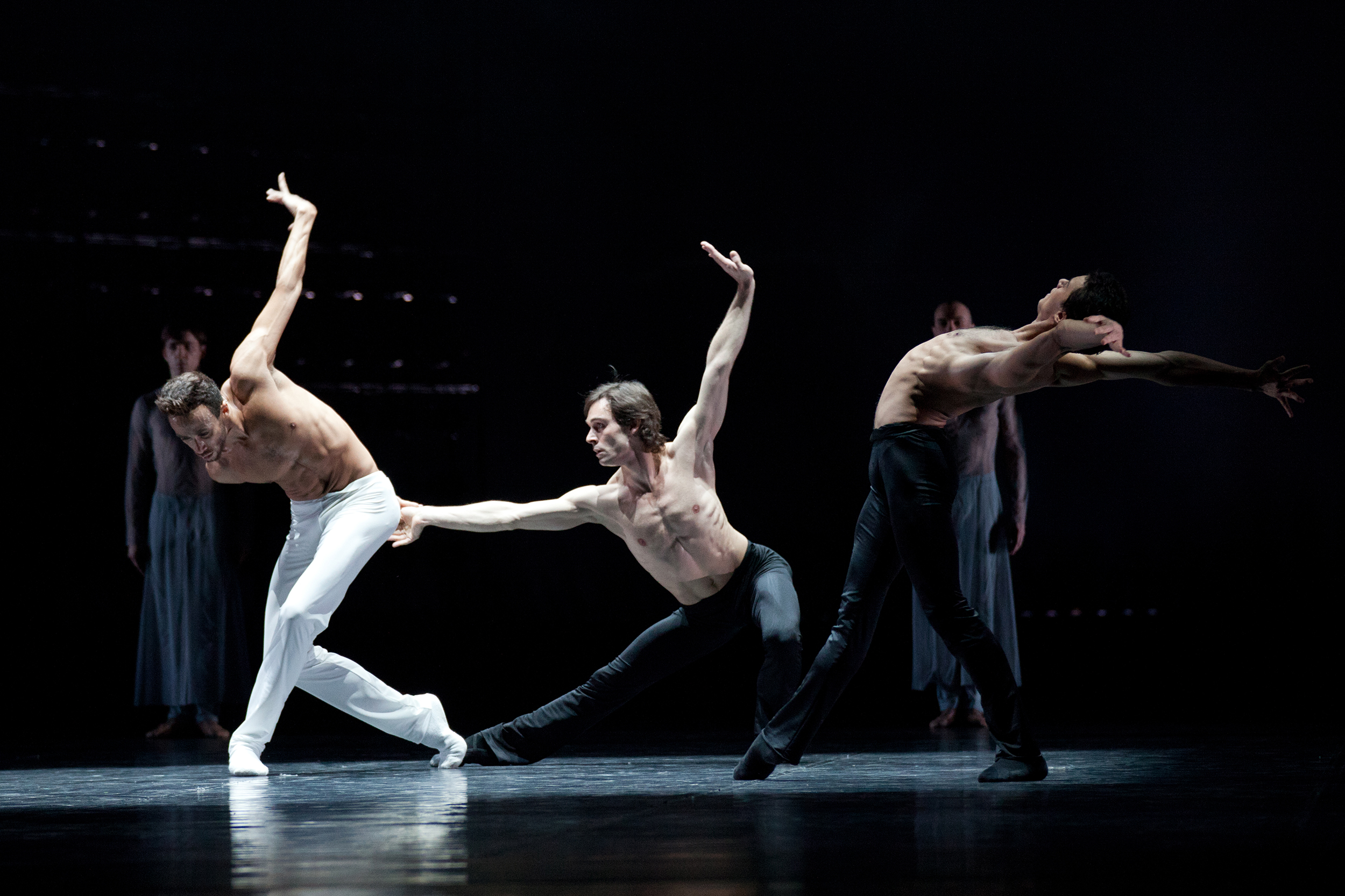
And the Rain Will Pass… by Krzysztof Pastor, Polish National Ballet: Rubi Pronk, Adam Kozal & Egor Menshikov

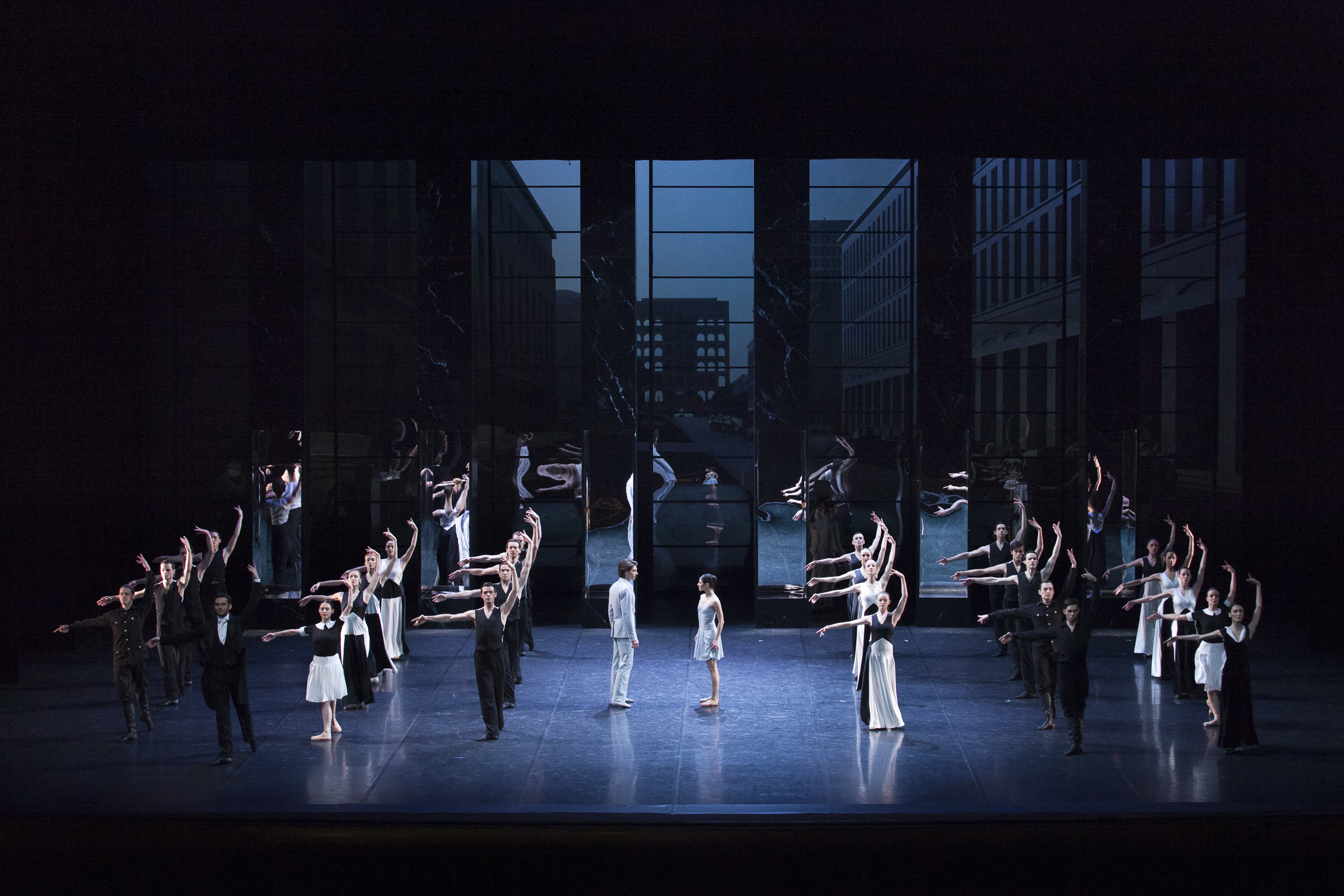
Romeo and Juliet by Krzysztof Pastor, Polish National Ballet

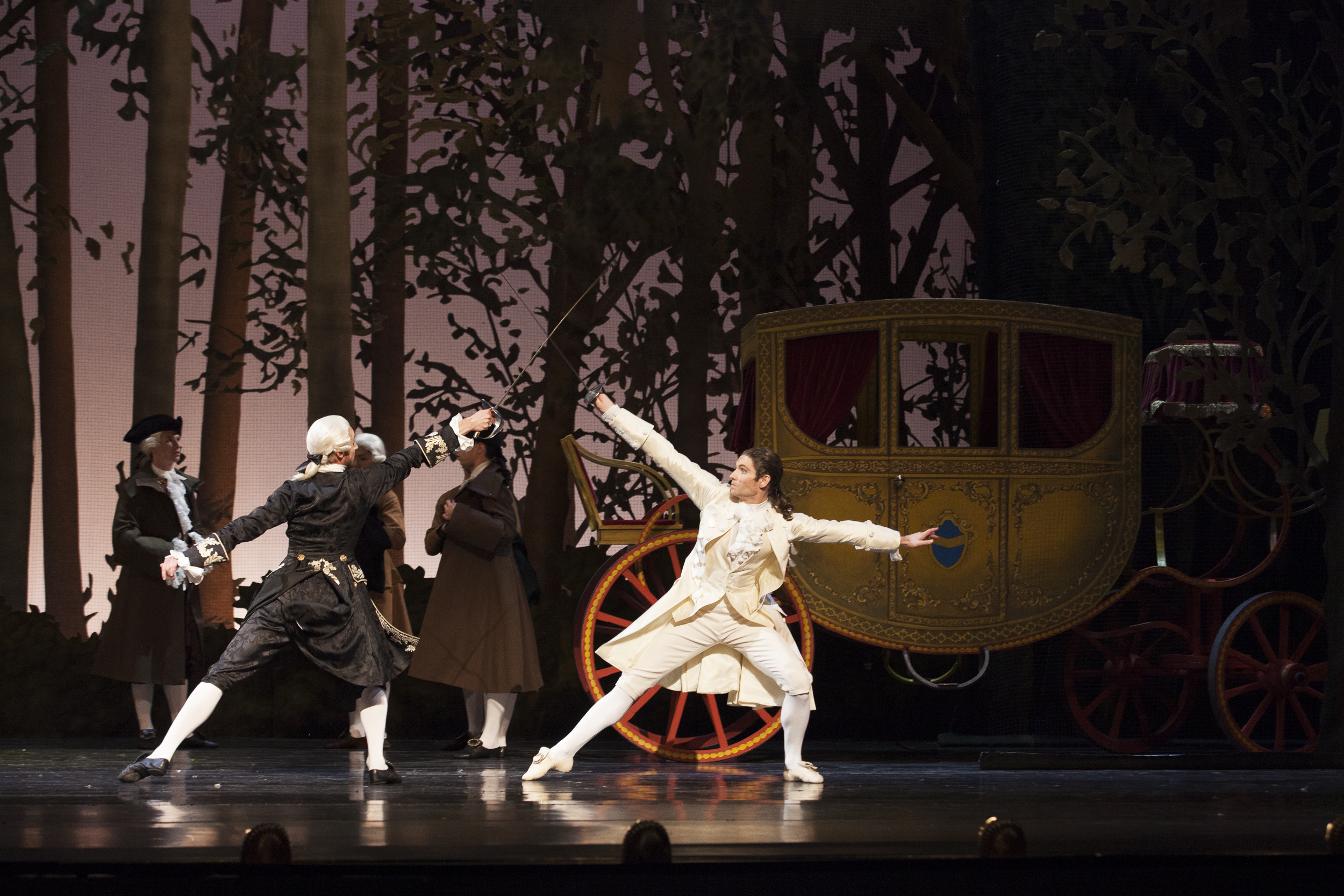
Casanova in Warsaw by Krzysztof Pastor, Polish National Ballet: Maksim Woitiul & Vladimir Yaroshenko

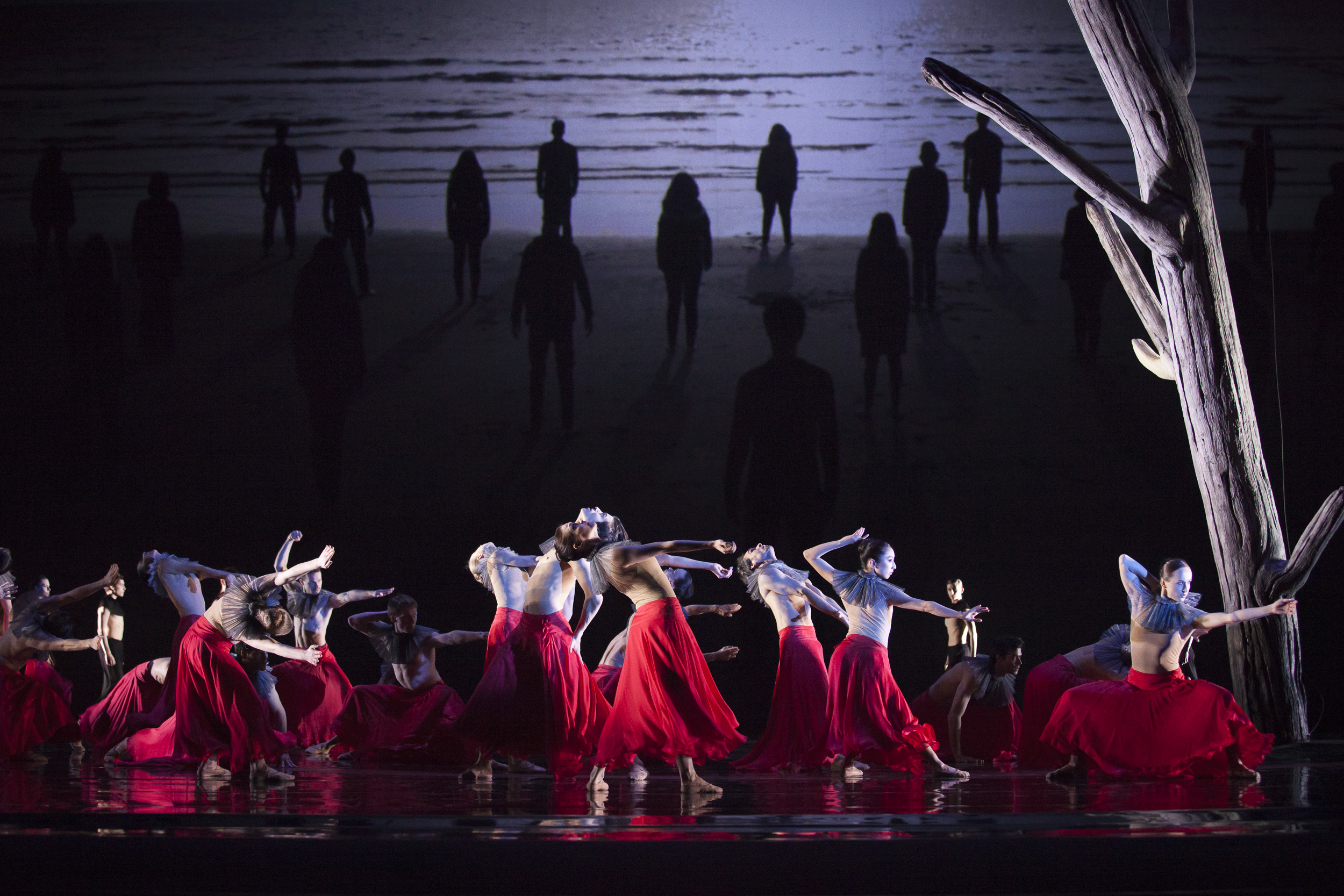
The Tempest by Krzysztof Pastor, Polish National Ballet

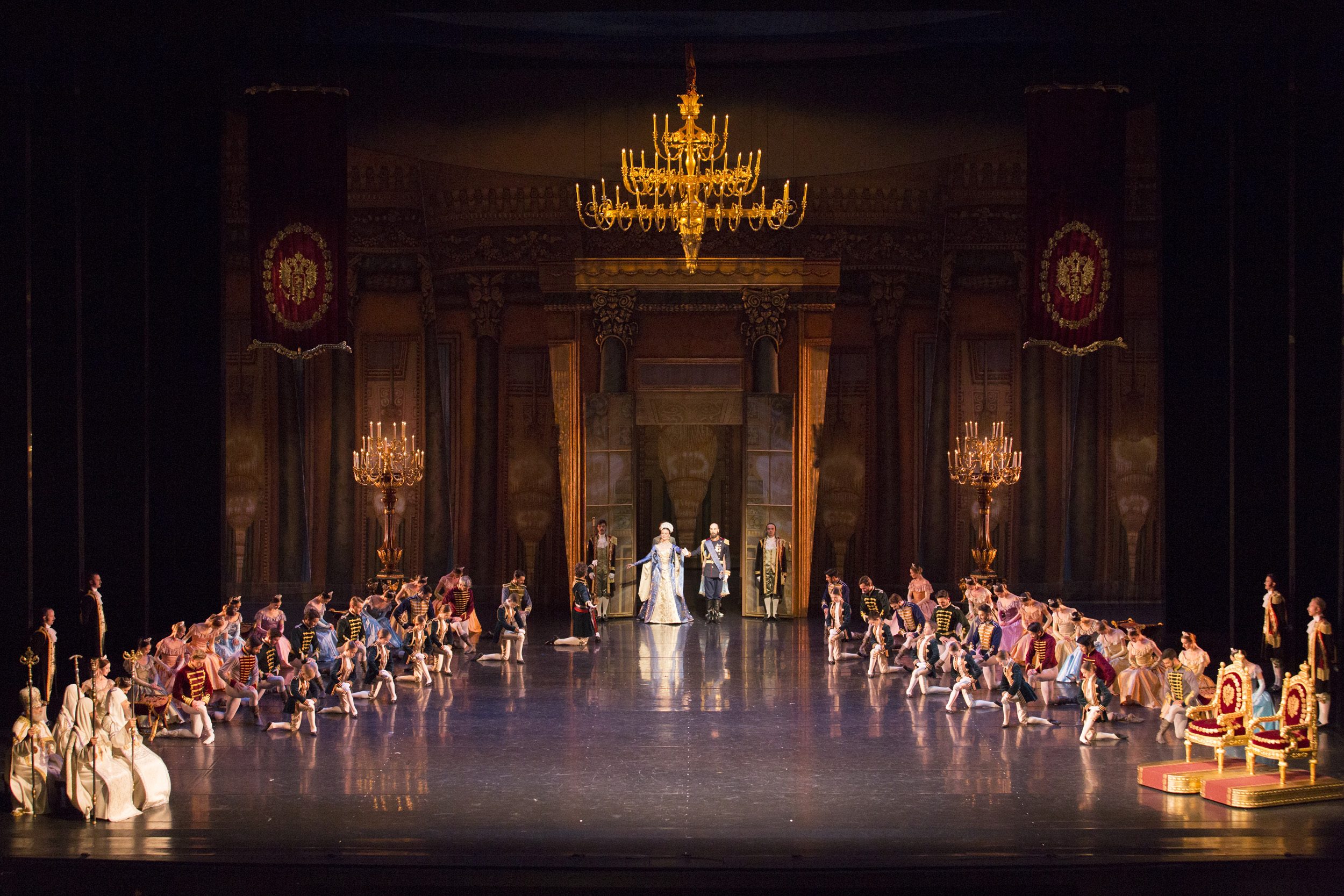
Swan Lake by Krzysztof Pastor, Polish National Ballet

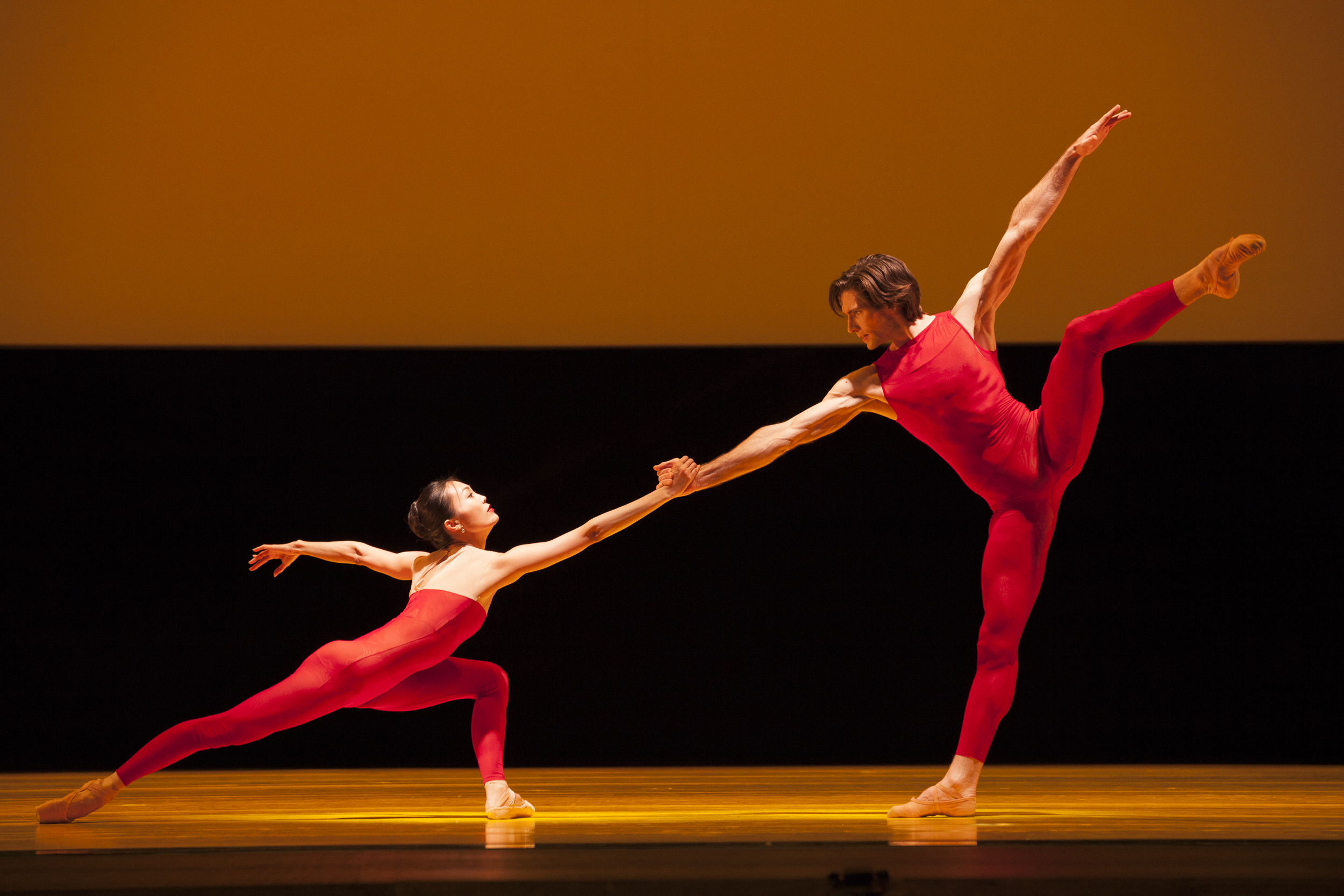
Bolero by Krzysztof Pastor, Polish National Ballet: Yuka Ebihara & Vladimir Yaroshenko

== Back to Poland ==
In Autumn 2008, Pastor came to Poland to discuss restaging his ballet Tristan, in Warsaw's Teatr Wielki. Production to the music of Richard Wagner was originally created for the Royal Swedish Ballet. At the time, Waldemar Dąbrowski – Teatr Wielki's general director, offered Pastor to take over the direction of the ballet in Warsaw. Being interested in this proposal, Pastor decided to return to Poland after 26 years of emigration, setting the conditions of ballet's artistic independence and autonomic operating conditions in the theatre structure, which would be analogous to other major ballet companies worldwide. Thanks to the efforts of director Dąbrowski, Minister of Culture and National Heritage Bogdan Zdrojewski agreed to appropriate changes in the theater's by-law. On 18 March 2009 Pastor took over the position of director of the ballet of Warsaw's Teatr Wielki, and in the same year by the decision of Minister Zdrojewski on 29 April it was separated in the structure of the theatre as Polish National Ballet and became equal to Polish National Opera. In addition to the new duties in Warsaw, Pastor still holds the position of resident choreographer in the Dutch National Ballet, and from 2011 until 2020 he shared his experience with the Lithuanian National Opera and Ballet Theatre in Vilnius, as ballet's artistic director. In 2021 he was appointed to the Program Board of the Polish National Institute for Music and Dance.

== Major choreographic works ==
- 1992: Shostakovich Chamber Symphony (Dutch National Ballet)
- 1993: Les Biches (The Israel Ballet)
- 1993: Stop It! (Dutch National Ballet; staged also at: The Washington Ballet, 1998)
- 1994: Symphony No. 3 by Górecki (Ballet of the Teatr Wielki – Polish National Opera; staged also at: Dutch National Ballet, 1996)
- 1995: Don’t Look Back… (DonauBallet)
- 1996: Firebird (Royal New Zealand Ballet; staged also at: West Australian Ballet, 1999)
- 1997: Piano Concerto by Gershwin (The Israel Ballet; staged also at: The Washington Ballet, 1997)
- 1997: Altri canti d’Amor (Teatro Massimo in Palermo)
- 1997: Carmen (Lithuanian National Ballet; staged also at: Latvian National Ballet, 2001; Hungarian Dance Academy, 2002)
- 1998: Passing By (The Washington Ballet)
- 1998: A Midsummer Night's Dream (Lithuanian National Ballet)
- 1999: Bitter-Sweet (Dutch National Ballet)
- 1999: Sonata by Brahms (The Washington Ballet)
- 1999: Hin- und hergerissen (Semperoper Ballett)
- 2000: Do Not Go Gentle… (Dutch National Ballet; staged also at: Polish National Ballet, 2019)
- 2000: The Silver Vail (Latvian National Ballet)
- 2000: In Light and Shadow (Dutch National Ballet; staged also at: Royal Swedish Ballet, 2003; Scottish Ballet, 2006; Ankara State Opera and Ballet, 2007; Hong Kong Ballet, 2010; Polish National Ballet, 2010; West Australian Ballet, 2020)
- 2001: The Rite of Spring (Latvian National Ballet)
- 2001: Kurt Weill (Dutch National Ballet; staged also at: Polish National Ballet, 2009)
- 2001: Bach Divisions (The Israel Ballet)
- 2002: Tao (Dutch National Ballet)
- 2002: Acid City (Lithuanian National Ballet)
- 2002: Encounters (Royal Ballet of Flanders)
- 2003: Si después de morir… (Dutch National Ballet)
- 2004: Opium (Dutch National Ballet)
- 2004: Voice (Dutch National Ballet)
- 2005: Don Giovanni (Dutch National Ballet)
- 2006: Tristan (Royal Swedish Ballet; staged also at: Polish National Ballet, 2009; Lithuanian National Ballet, 2012)
- 2006: Dangerous Liaisons (Latvian National Ballet; staged also at: Poznań Grand Theatre, 2010, National Theatre in Brno, 2011; Ballet of Opera Nova in Bydgoszcz, 2023)
- 2006: Crossing Paths (Dutch National Ballet)
- 2006: Suite for Two (Dutch National Ballet)
- 2007: Visions at Dusk (Dutch National Ballet)
- 2007: Symphonie fantastique (The Australian Ballet)
- 2008: Tristan and Isolde - Pas de deux (Svetlana Zakharova and Andrei Merkuriev, Bolshoi Ballet)
- 2008: Romeo and Juliet (Scottish Ballet; staged also at: Polish National Ballet, 2014; Joffrey Ballet, 2014; Lithuanian National Ballet, 2016)
- 2008: Moving Rooms (Dutch National Ballet; staged also at: Polish National Ballet, 2012; Czech National Ballet, 2023, Poznań Grand Theatre, 2023)
- 2009: Chopin Dances (The Israel Ballet)
- 2009: Scheherazade (Dutch National Ballet)
- 2009: Dumbarton Dances (Dutch National Ballet)
- 2010: Nijinsky – Dancer, Clown, God (Dutch National Ballet)
- 2011: And the Rain Will Pass… (Polish National Ballet)
- 2012: Chapters (Dutch National Ballet)
- 2012: Bolero (Dutch National Ballet; staged also at: Lithuanian National Ballet, 2015; Latvian National Ballet, 2015; Polish National Ballet, 2016; Teatro dell’Opera di Roma, 2023)
- 2014: Adagio&Scherzo (Polish National Ballet; staged also at: Theater Augsburg, 2016)
- 2014: The Tempest (Dutch National Ballet; staged also at: Polish National Ballet, 2016)
- 2014: The Nutcracker (Lithuanian National Ballet)
- 2015: Casanova in Warsaw (Polish National Ballet)
- 2017: Swan Lake with new libretto (Polish National Ballet)
- 2018: Dracula (West Australian Ballet; staged also at: Latvian National Ballet, 2021; Queensland Ballet, 2021, Polish National Ballet, 2022; Finnish National Ballet, 2023 - in plan)
- 2018: The Miraculous Mandarin (Lithuanian National Ballet)
- 2018: Concerto in F minor by Chopin (Polish National Ballet)
- 2018: Polish Dances - Polonaise & Mazurka (Polish National Ballet)
- 2019: Toccata by Wojciech Kilar (Polish National Ballet; staged also at: Dutch National Ballet - Junior Company, 2024)
- 2021: Tristan and Isolde - Pas de deux (Teatro alla Scala)
- 2021: Verklärte Nacht by Schönberg (Lithuanian National Ballet)
- 2022: Swan Lake, new version (West Australian Ballet)
- 2023: Kilar Concerto (Polish National Ballet)
- 2025: Prometheus (Polish National Ballet)
- 2026: An American in Paris (Ballet of Opera Nova in Bydgoszcz)

== Awards and state orders ==
- 1995: Gold Choreography Prize, International Ballet Competition in Helsinki (Finland)
- 2000: Medal of 200 Years of Polish Ballet from the Ministry of Culture (Poland)
- 2000: Choreography Prize, Dansersfonds'79 (Netherlands)
- 2002: Nomination for international Prix Benois de la Danse for Kurt Weill
- 2010: Polish Performing Artists Union (ZASP) Award - Terpsychora (Terpsichore)
- 2011: Gold Medal for Merit to Culture ‘Gloria Artis’
- 2014: Prize of the Minister of Culture and National Heritage (Poland)
- 2015: Officer's Cross of the Order of Polonia Restituta
- 2016: Association of Authors and Composers (ZAiKS) Award for choreographic achievements (Poland)
- 2016: Honorary Golden Star of the Ministry of Culture of the Republic of Lithuania
- 2017: Statuette and a title of an „Outstanding Pole” from Polish Promotional Emblem Foundation “Teraz Polska”
- 2019: Performing Arts WA Dance Award for Best New Work for Dracula
- 2021: Cross of Officer of the Order for Merits to Lithuania
