= Vienna Festival Ballet =

Ballet company

The Vienna Festival Ballet, is a classical ballet company founded in 1980 by Peter Mallek. Based in the United Kingdom, they typically spend eight months of the year touring small and medium venues around the country, with the occasional foreign trip.

== Repertoire ==
They have been touring the UK since 1980. Their repertoire includes Swan Lake, The Nutcracker, The Sleeping Beauty, Giselle, Cinderella, Coppélia, Othello, La Sylphide, Rhapsody in Blue, An American in Paris, and Bolero (after Bejart).

== Dancers ==
- Samantha Camejo
- Yoshiko Kabuta
- Ellodie-Lark Stott
- Jodie McKnight
- Carl Hale
- Tomoya Tanimoto Jequier
- Emily Hufton
- Agnese Remolo
- Phil King
- Melanie Cox
- Amy Fussell
- Simon Jequier
- Eva Koniavitou
- Azusa Urano
- Simona Marsibilio
- Joseph Mackie-Graves

== Biographies ==
=== Peter Mallek ===
Artistic director Peter Mallek trained in Vienna under the Russian teacher Harry Pluciss, a former pupil of the world famous ballet master Pushkin. He performed with the national ballet companies of the world e.g. American Ballet Theatre, London Festival Ballet, Scottish Ballet, Australian Ballet and the Dutch National Ballet.

=== Melanie Cox ===
Melanie Cox went to the Arts Educational School, Tring Park, now Tring Park School for the Performing Arts, aged 11. She joined the company after graduation from the school in July 2007.

In 2008 she took part as a visiting professional in the Kent Youth Dance Company production Excerpts and Originals in her home town of Herne Bay, Kent.

=== Samantha Camejo ===
Samantha Camejo was born in Rio de Janeiro, Brazil. She trained at the Maria Olenewa State Dance School which is part of the Municipal Theater of Rio de Janeiro. She was awarded a scholarship to the London Studio Centre. She joined the company in 2007.

=== Amy Fussell ===
Amy Fussell is from Walsall in the West Midlands, England. She joined the company in September 2008, aged 20, after studying for 4 years at the Central School of Ballet in London. A former pupil of Little Bloxwich School in Walsall and Abotts Bromley School for Girls, near Lichfield, she was 4 when she joined the Walsall Academy of Dance in The Butts, Walsall.

=== Carl Hale ===
Carl Hale is from Dudley in the West Midlands, England. He joined the company in the summer of 2007, aged 19, after spending three years at the Rambert School of Ballet and Contemporary Dance. He was the Jester in Swan Lake on the 2008 tour. graduating in July 2005.

=== Emily Hufton ===
Emily Hufton joined the Company in February 2007, aged 19, while completing her final year at Elmhurst Ballet School, which she entered following three years as a Junior Associate of the Royal Ballet School. Emily has twice been a visiting professional at Kent Youth Dance summer schools and worked with the English National Ballet as well as touring with the Birmingham Royal Ballet.

=== Phil King ===
Born in Lancaster and after an early training at the Joan Ward School, he went on to the study at the Rambert School in London. He then performed with Rambert Dance Company, dancing Itzik Galili's A Linha Curva before joining the Vienna Festival Ballet in 2008 as a soloist. in 2009 he danced his first principal as the Nutcracker Prince, and was consequently cast as Siegfried in Swan Lake the following season.

=== Joseph Mackie-Graves ===
Joseph joined Vienna Festival Ballet for its 2010 production of 'The Sleeping Beauty'. Originally from Cambridge, Joseph graduated from Ballet West in early 2010 before joining the schools company for its tour to China. Joseph has worked with companies including European Ballet, Ballet West, Belinda King Creative Productions, Fog Productions, NSPCC and Fit To Dance Company.
