= Romeo and Juliet (Pastor) =

2008 ballet by Krzysztof Pastor

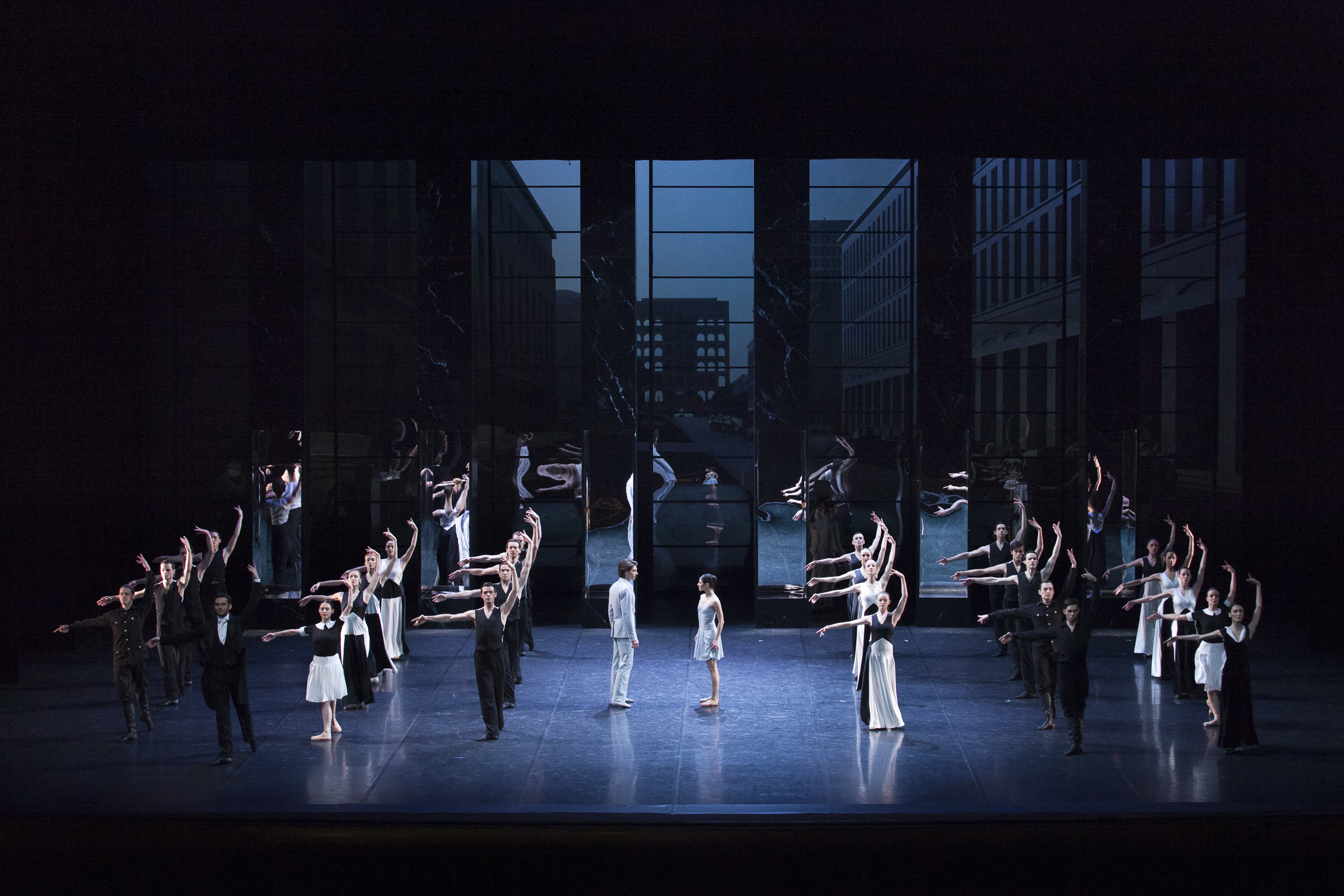
"Romeo and Juliet" performed by Polish National Ballet, Warsaw

Romeo and Juliet is a 2008 ballet choreographed by Krzysztof Pastor based on William Shakespeare's play Romeo and Juliet. Pastor's three-act version is set to the same score used in the Prokofiev version of the ballet. The libretto is by Pastor and Willem Bruls.

== Synopsis ==
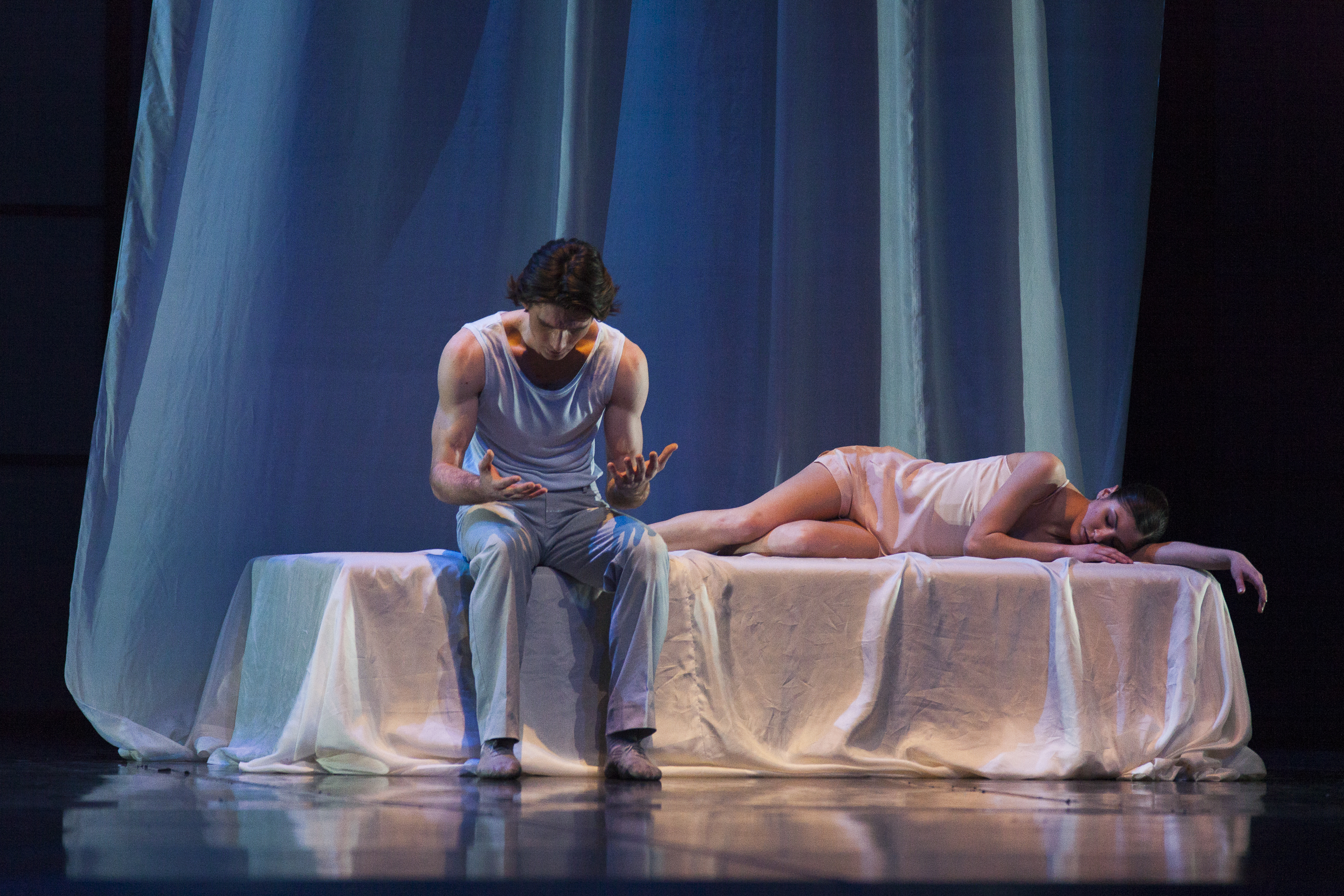
Vladimir Yaroshenko and Maria Żuk as Romeo and Juliet, Polish National Ballet, Warsaw

The ballet is recast as a contemporary political statement set in three Italian political eras of the 20th century. Act I is set in Italy in the 1930s, during the reign of Benito Mussolini and the emergence of Fascism. (1935 was the year in which Prokofiev composed the original score.) Act II takes place in the 1950s, amid the rise of the Red Brigades and political terrorism. Act III is set in the 1990s during Silvio Berlusconi's tenure of social unrest, which serves as the backdrop for the climatic tragedy. The content of the three acts mirrors the contemporary Italian eras. In the first act, paralleling the rise of Fascism, the upper-class Capulet family is depicted with "stiff, militaristic movement", while the lower-class Montegue family is characterized by "loose, flowing motions laced with pedestrian naturalism". In the second act, paralleling the Red Brigades era of political terrorism, the romance of Romeo and Juliet is dogged by interfamilial feuding and conflict. In the third act, paralleling the "social divisions" of the Berlusconi era, the lovers meet their tragic fate. The work is accompanied by a "multimedia video backdrop".

== Performances ==
The ballet was premiered by the Scottish Ballet in 2008 at the Edinburgh Festival Theatre. Following its debut, it toured the United Kingdom in 2010, and in the weeks prior to its United States premiere it was performed in the Grand Theatre by the Polish National Ballet. Its United States premiere will be by the Joffrey Ballet at Auditorium Theatre with music performed by the Chicago Philharmonic Orchestra in 2014. The Joffrey had previously performed Cranko's adaptation of Prokofiev multiple times as early as 1984, when it gave the Prokofiev score its United States debut. In 2014, there was also an encore UK touring production that visited Inverness, Aberdeen, Edinburgh, London and Glasgow.
