= Polish National Ballet =

Classical ballet company based in Warsaw

General information
- Name: Polish National Ballet
- Previous names: Balet Teatru Wielkiego – Opery Narodowej
- Year founded: 1765
- Founders: Stanisław II August
- Principal venue: Grand Theatre, Warsaw
- Website: teatrwielki.pl

Artistic staff
- Artistic director: Krzysztof Pastor

Other
- Formation: Leading soloist; Soloist; Corps de Ballet

The Polish National Ballet (Polish: Polski Balet Narodowy, PBN) is the largest and most influential ballet company in Poland. It continues a ballet heritage, dating to the 17th century.

Prior to 2008 it was known as the ballet of the Teatr Wielki - Polish National Opera. In that year the ballet company received artistic autonomy reflected in the theatre's by-laws; it was elevated to the rank of Polish National Ballet. The director since has been Polish choreographer Krzysztof Pastor.

== Ballet events in Polish history ==
=== Seventeenth century ===
In 1628 a traveling Italian opera troupe created the first ballet performances in Poland. Ballet scenes were then often incorporated into operas held at the court theater. For many years it was primarily foreign dancers who performed. They served as exemplars for their Polish counterparts.

=== Eighteenth century ===
Eventually in 1765 the first permanent ballet company was formed, on the initiative of the king Stanisław II August. The company functioned with some interruptions in the Saxon’s Opernhaus (opera house), the first Polish public theater. A 1766 book on ballet by the famous ballet master of France Jean-Georges Noverre was dedicated to the Polish king.

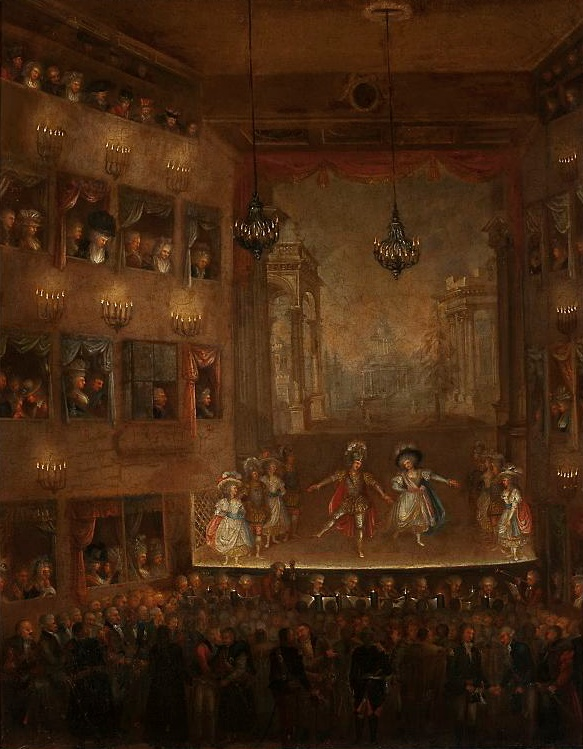
Michał Rymiński and Dorota Sitańska from His Majesty’s National Dancers in Daniel Curz's ballet in the opera Pirro by Paisella at the Theatre at Krasiński Square, 1790, National Museum in Warsaw

Maciej Pręczyński (Prenczyński) was the first well-known Polish dancer. He worked with Gasparo Angiolini in Venice and in Vienna during the 1770s.

In 1785 Stanisław II August established a company of young dancers, taught by a ballet school at an estate in Lithuania. This first professional ballet company of predominantly Polish dancers was known as His Majesty’s National Dancers (1785-1794). Performances were held on stage at the National Theatre building in Krasiński Square, Warsaw. Its royal heritage was continued by subsequent Polish companies.

=== Nineteenth century ===
In Warsaw uring the Romantic era the National Ballet School flourished. After 1818 it was guided by two French ballet masters Louis Thierry and Maurice Pion. Under construction from 1825 to 1833, the Teatr Wielki (Grand Theater) then became the artistic center for both opera and ballet in Poland. At mid-century the choreographer and teacher Roman Turczynowicz became the ballet master. Also, several outstanding foreign masters, e.g., Filippo Taglioni, Carlo Blasis, Virgilio Calori, Pasquale Borri, José Mendez, Raffaele Grassi, and Enrico Cecchetti, worked developing Polish dancers.

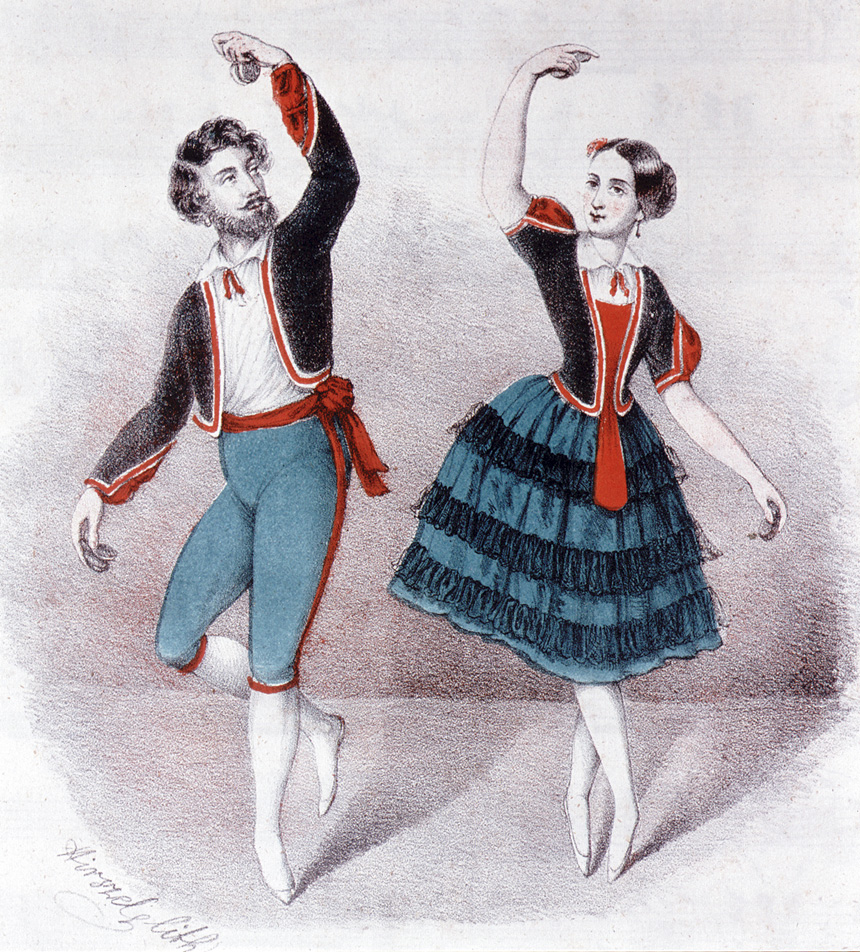
Leading dancers of Polish romantic ballet: Aleksander Tarnowski & Konstancja Turczynowicz in cachucha, 1847, Teatr Wielki, Theatre Museum in Warsaw

Mathilde Kschessinska (Matylda Krzesińska), a dancer of Polish extraction, from the 1890s was one of the leading lights of the Imperial Theater in St. Petersburg.

=== Twentieth century ===
Ballets Russes

From its early years many Polish dancers had joined the Ballets Russes of Sergei Diaghilev, which climbed to world renown. These included the ballet master Stanislas Idzikowski, Leon Woizikovsky (orig. Wójcikowski), and Mieczyslaw Pianowski. Polish dancers also distinguished themselves in the various Ballets Russes companies that succeeded Diaghilev's. Among these were Yurek Shabelevski, Roman Jasinski, Marian Ladre, Yurek Lazovski, and Nina Novak.

Siblings Bronislava Nijinska and Vaslav Nijinsky were of Polish heritage, though Vatsa and Broni trained under the patronage of the Tsar at the Imperial Academy in St. Petersburg. They danced with Ballets Russes, Nijinsky being celebrated internationally as he reached the pinnacle of the art. Both were choreographers for Diaghilev, the older Nijinsky before the war, Nijinska during the 1920s.

Balet Polski

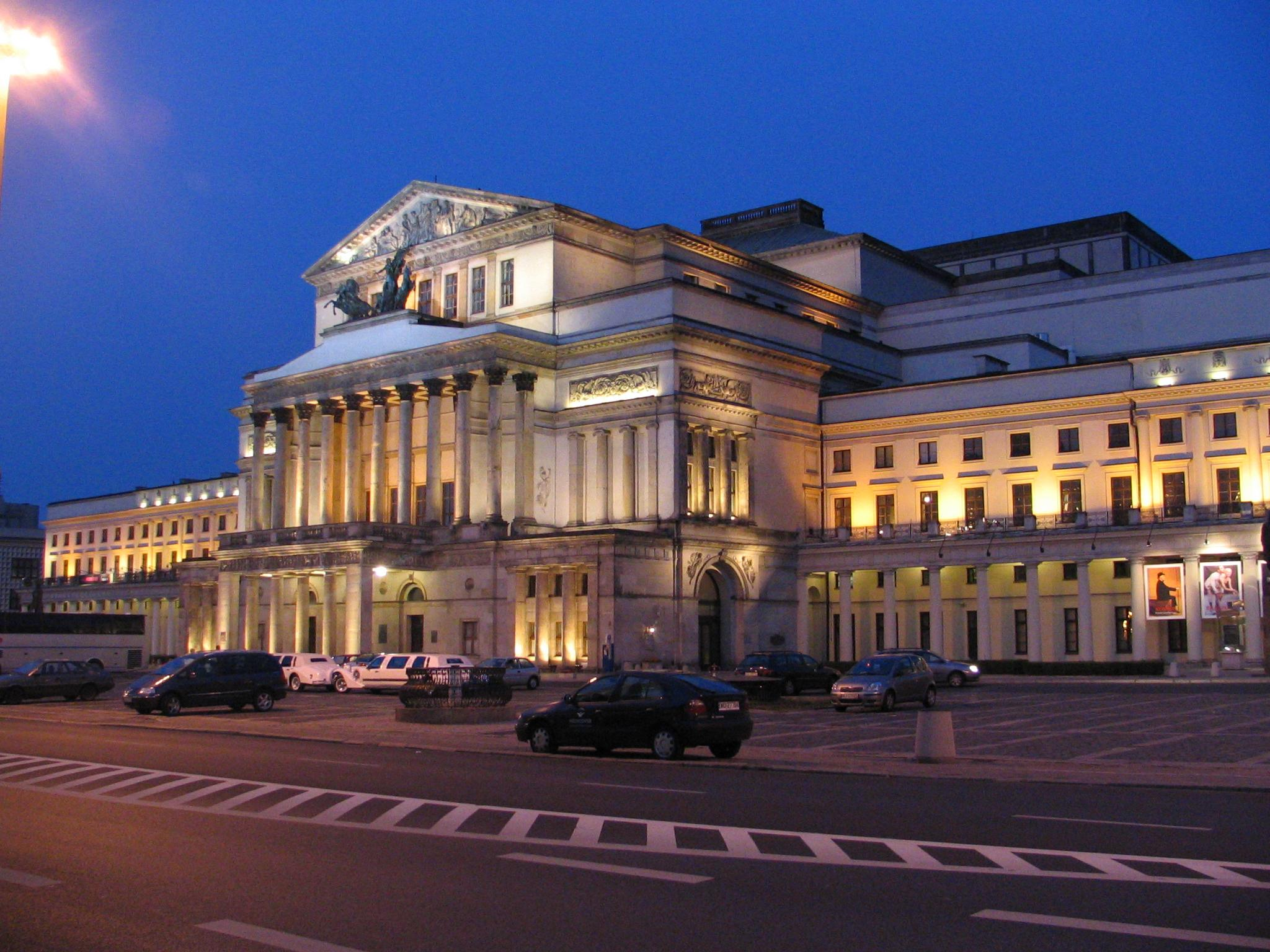
Teatr Wielki (Grand Theater) in Warsaw, home of the Polish National Ballet

During the Second Polish Republic, Nijinska headed the Balet Polski, aka Les Ballets Polonais, aka The Polish Ballets newly formed in Warsaw in 1937. This company was the brainchild of poet Jan Lechoń, and created with the assistance of M. Waclaw Jedrzejewicz, Minister of Public Education and President of the Organization Committee of the Polish Section to the Art and Technical Exhibition in Paris. The company's general director was Arnold Szyfman.

For the first season, 1937-1938, Nijinska created five new ballets including Baśń krakowska (La Légende de Cracovie), to music by Michal Kondracki; Pieśń o ziemi naszej (Le Chant de la Terre), to music by Roman Palester; Koncert E-moll Chopina (Concerto de Chopin), to Frédéric Chopin's B-minor piano concerto; Apollo i dziewczyna (Apollon et la Belle), to music by Ludomir Rozycki; and Wezwanie (Le Rappel), set to a score by Boleslaw Woytowicz. This repertoire featured scenery and costumes designed by Teresa Roszkowska, Waclaw Borowski, Wladyslaw Daszewski, and Irena Lorentowicz-Karwowska. The souvenir program for this company's Covent Garden appearances states: "Every gesture and every colour, the ebb and flow of the groups, each step of the soloists, the spirit and harmony of the Polish Ballets are imbued with the artistic ideals of Bronislava Nijinska and her ardent desire that the world should see the dances of her country in their noblest and most beautiful form." At the Paris Exposition Internationale of that year, this Polish Ballet won the Grand Prix for performance, Nijinska the Gran Prix for choreography. In 1938 the Ballets Polonais was directed by Leon Wójcikowski. It appeared at the New York World's Fair in 1939, but World War II caused its closure.

Ballet of Teatro Wielki

Following the traumas of war, the 'Ballet of Teatr Wielki' reemerged in Warsaw. Yet the original Teatr Wielki had been almost completely destroyed during the 1939 siege of Warsaw. Eventually it was rebuilt and enlarged, in a new facility (also called the Opera Narodowa [National Opera]). Continuing a heritage of several centuries, the new theater opened in 1965. It housed the companies and schools for both opera and ballet, its stage being shared. The dance company later became the Polish National Ballet, which continues to rehearse and perform in Teatr Wielki.

== Under new name and status ==
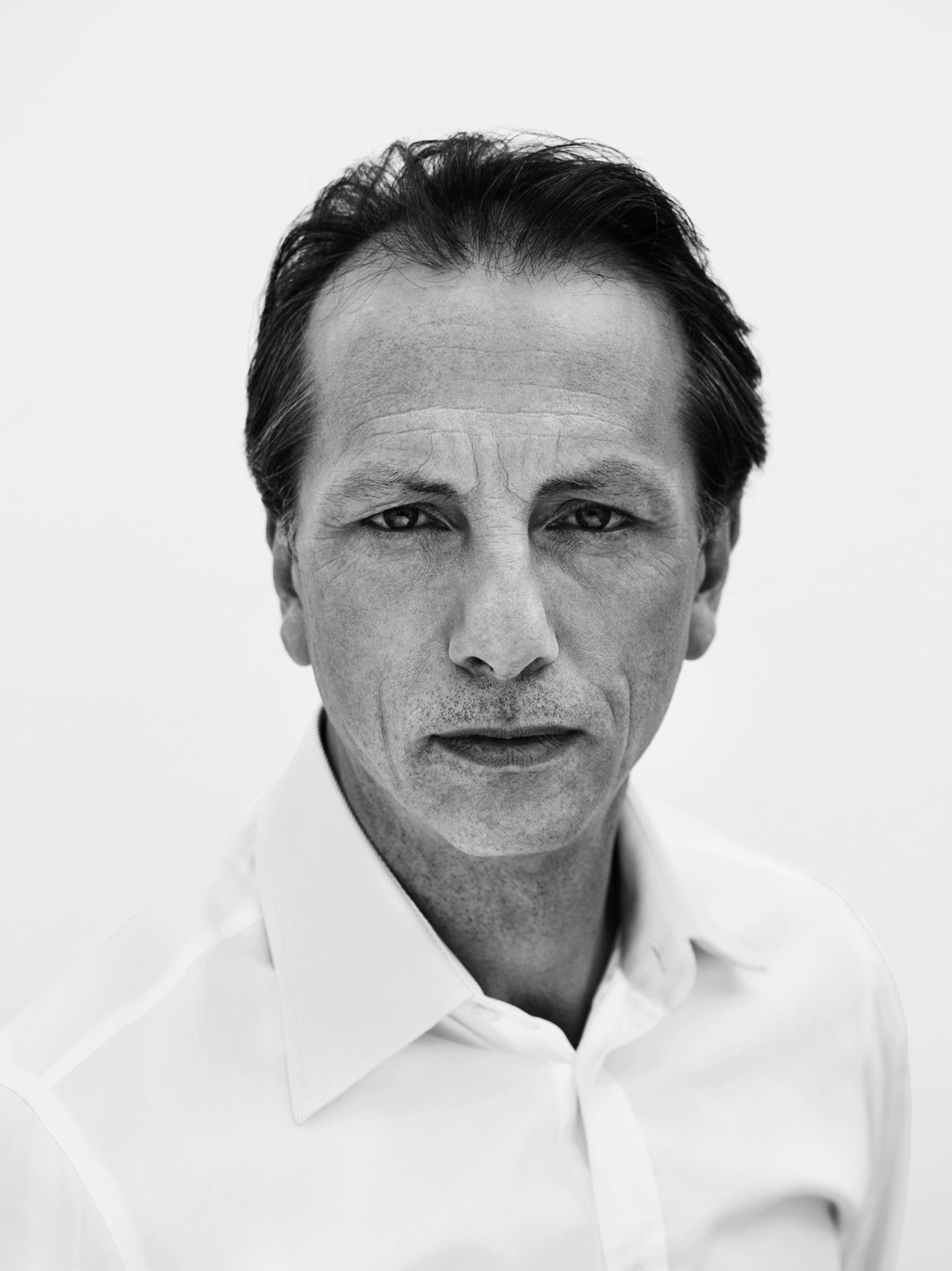
Krzysztof Pastor, director of the Polish National Ballet, photo Łukasz Murgrabia

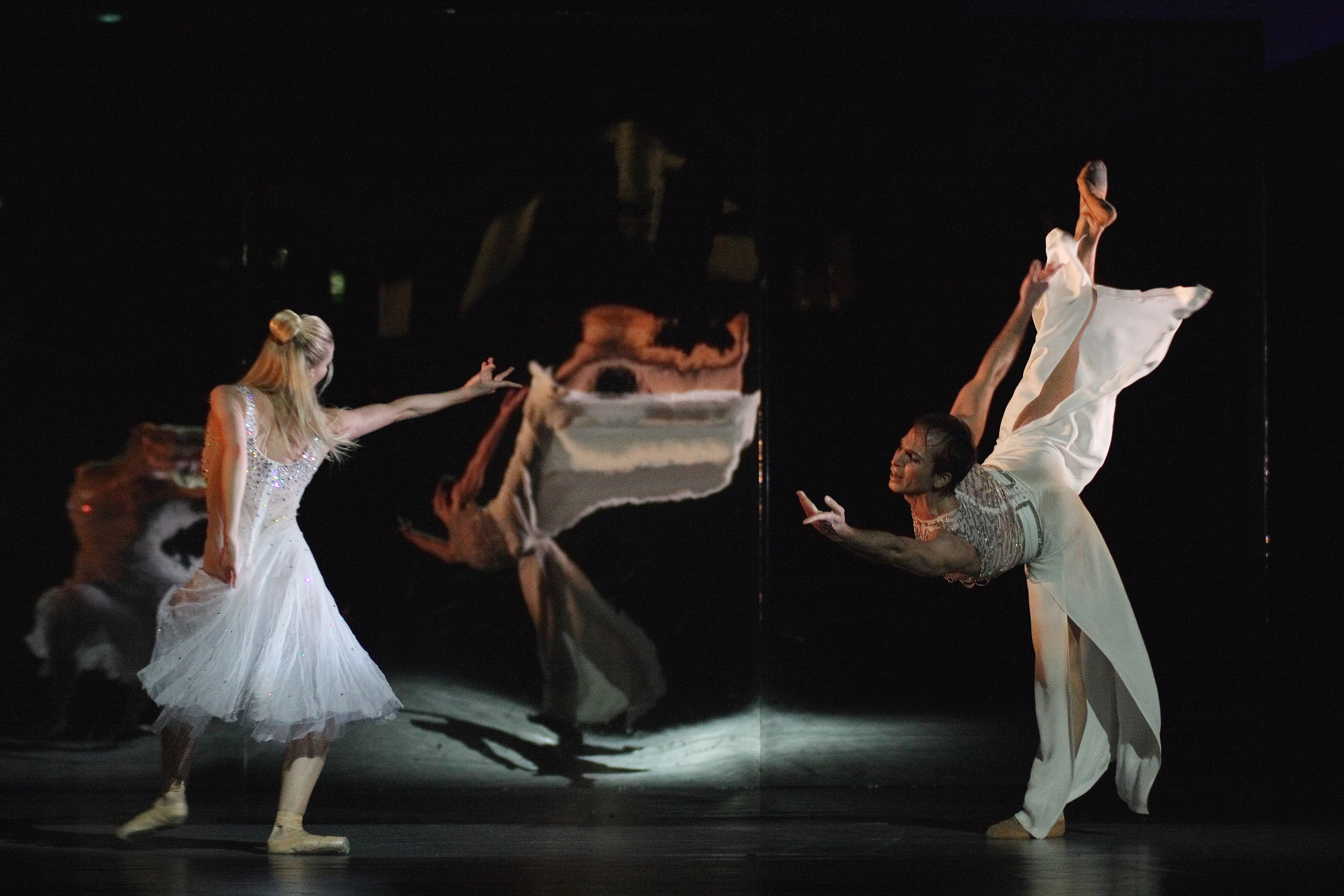
Tristan by Krzysztof Pastor, dancers: Izabela Milewska & Jan-Erik Wikström

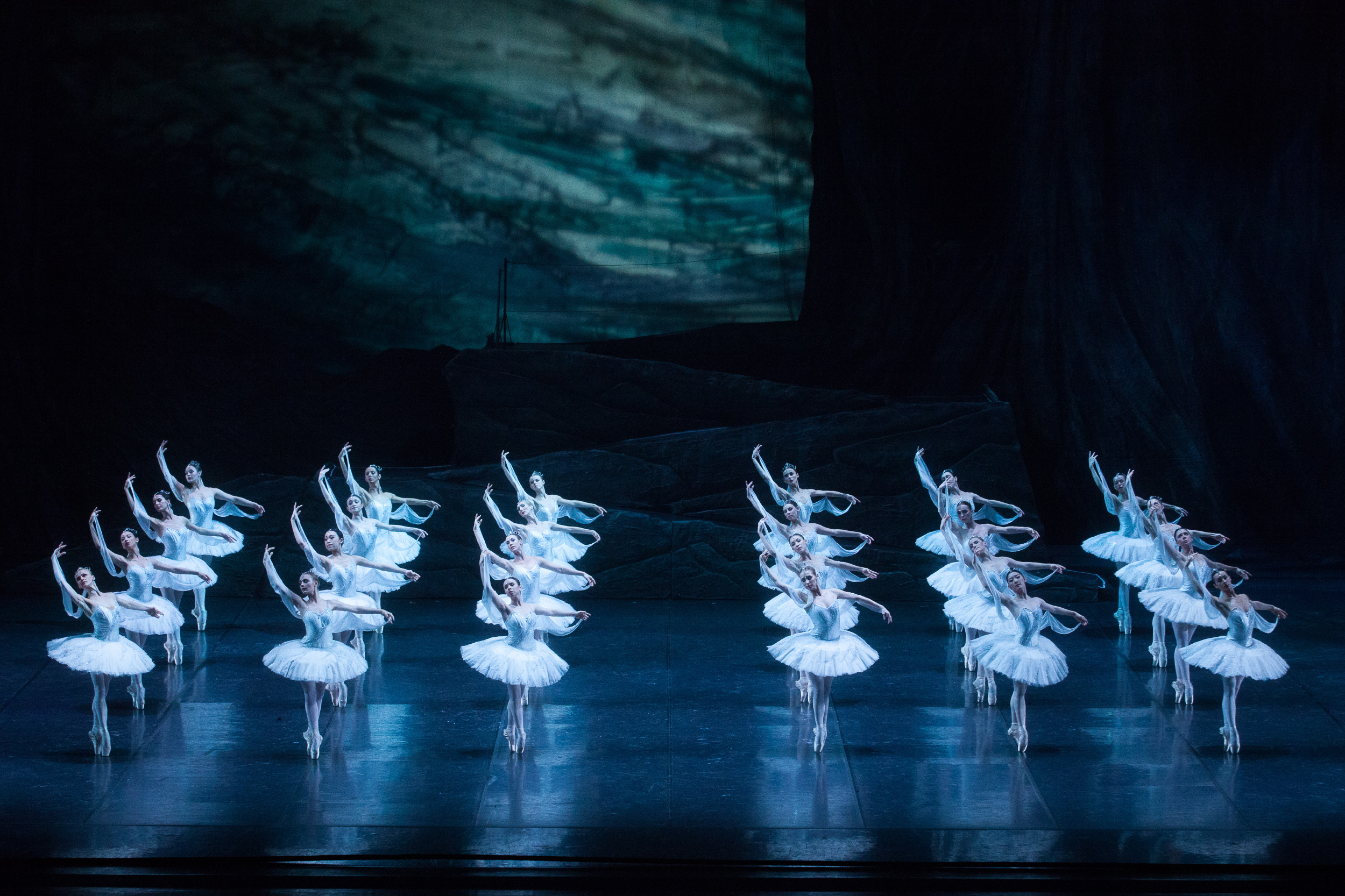
La Bayadère by Natalia Makarova after Marius Petipa, Polish National Ballet

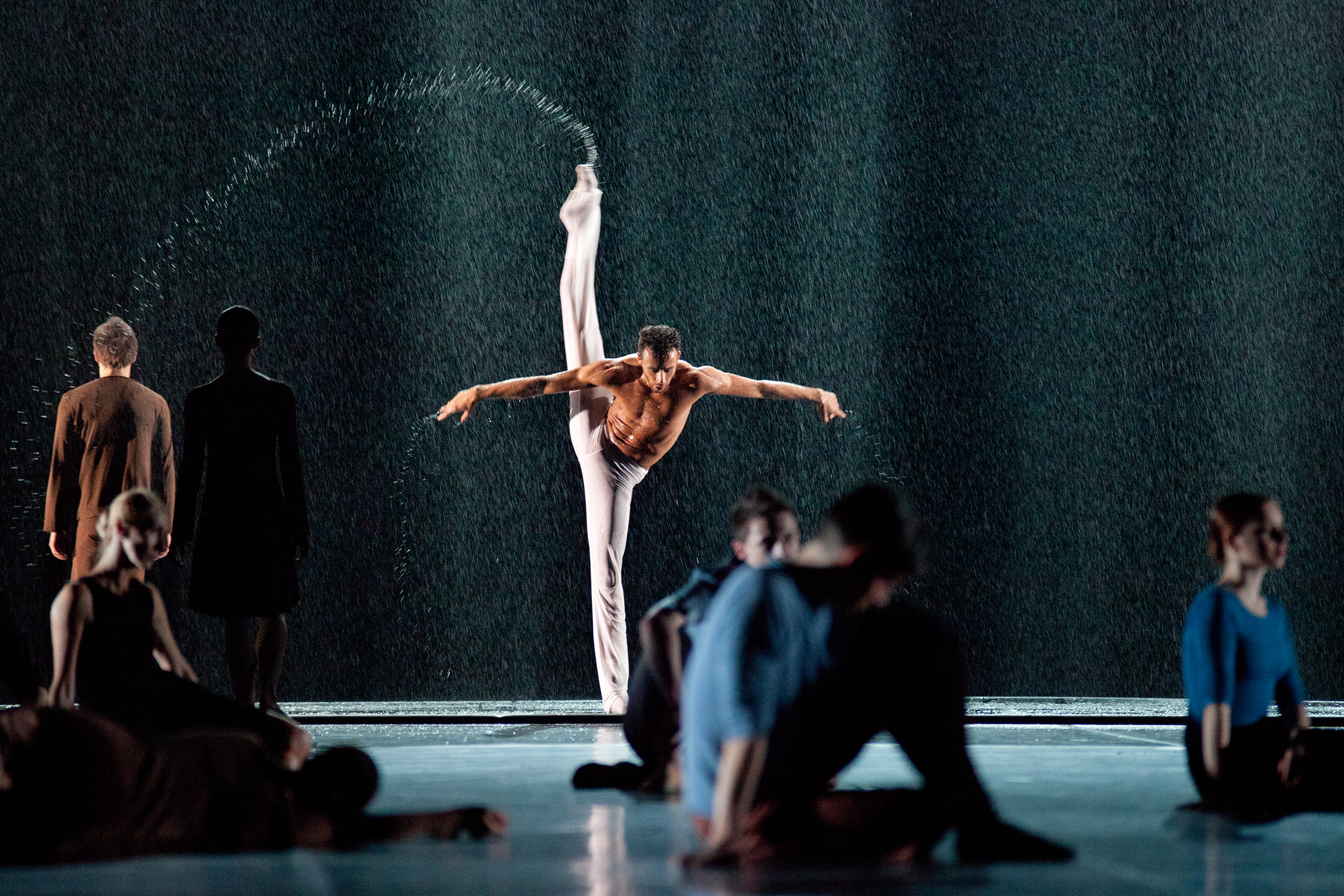
And the Rain Will Pass… by Krzysztof Pastor, dancer: Rubi Pronk & Polish National Ballet

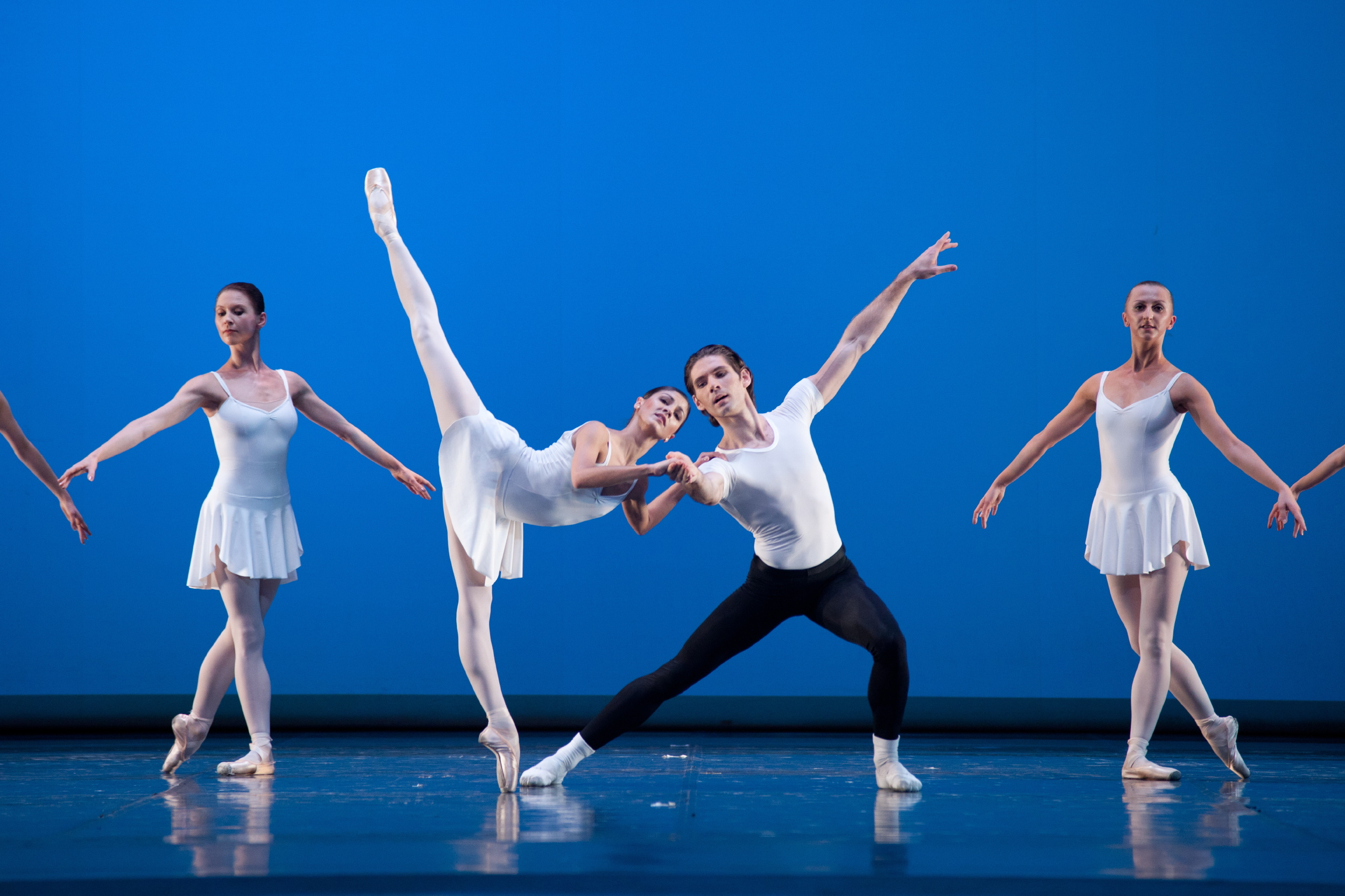
Concerto Barocco by George Balanchine, dancers: Maria Żuk & Vladimir Yaroshenko and Polish National Ballet

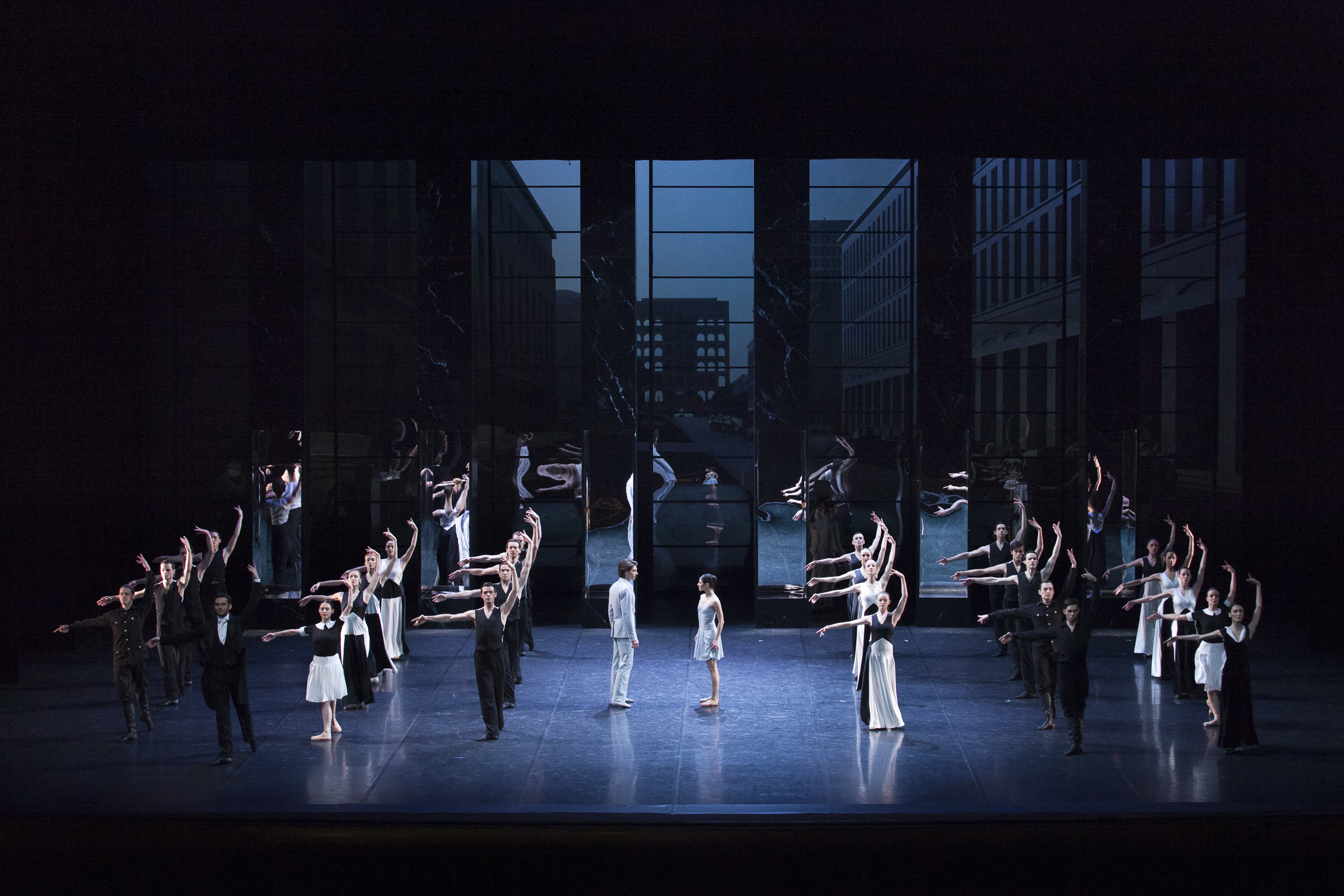
Romeo et Juliet by Krzysztof Pastor, Polish National Ballet

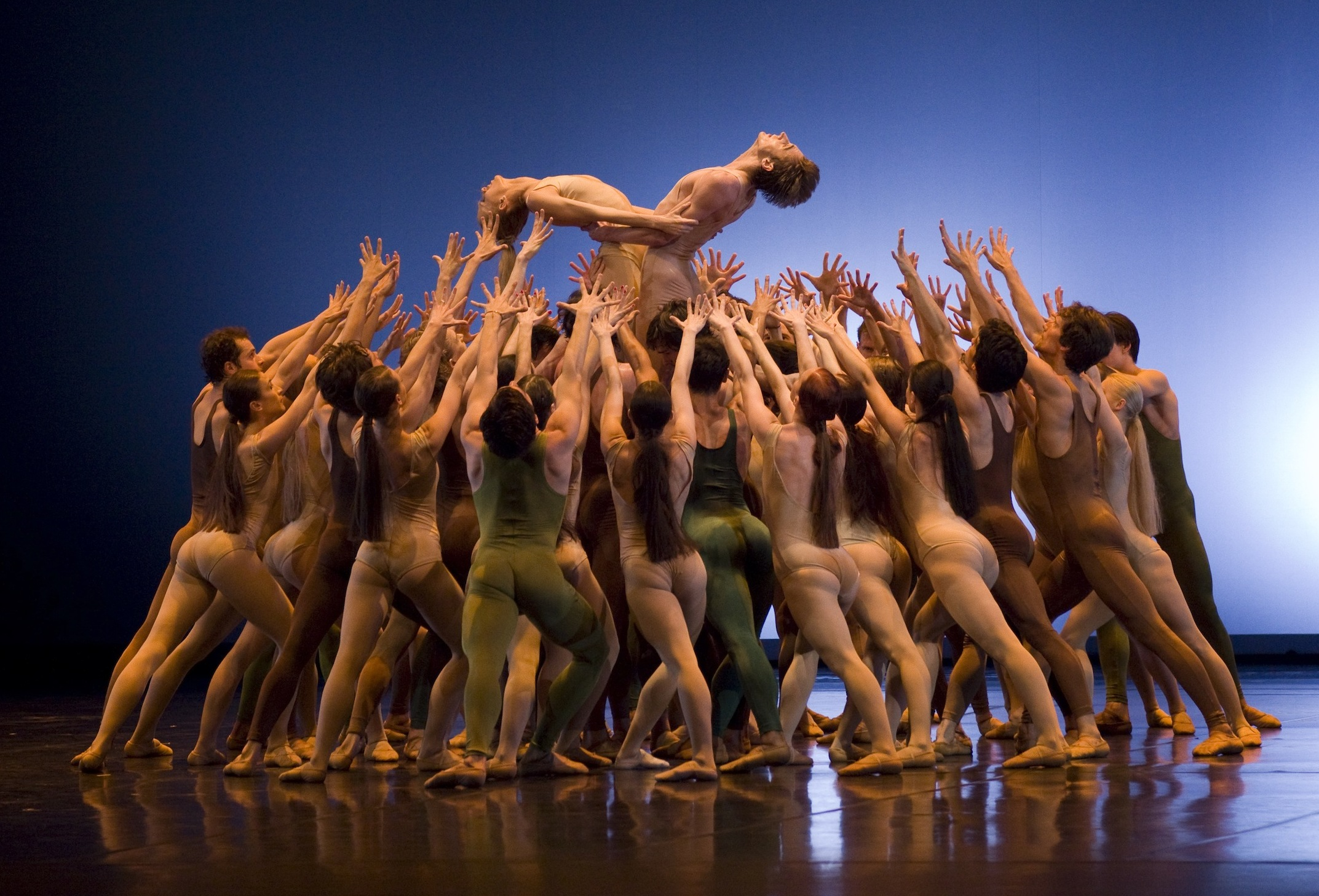
Le Sacre du printemps by Maurice Béjart, soloists: Anna Lorenc & Maksim Woitiul

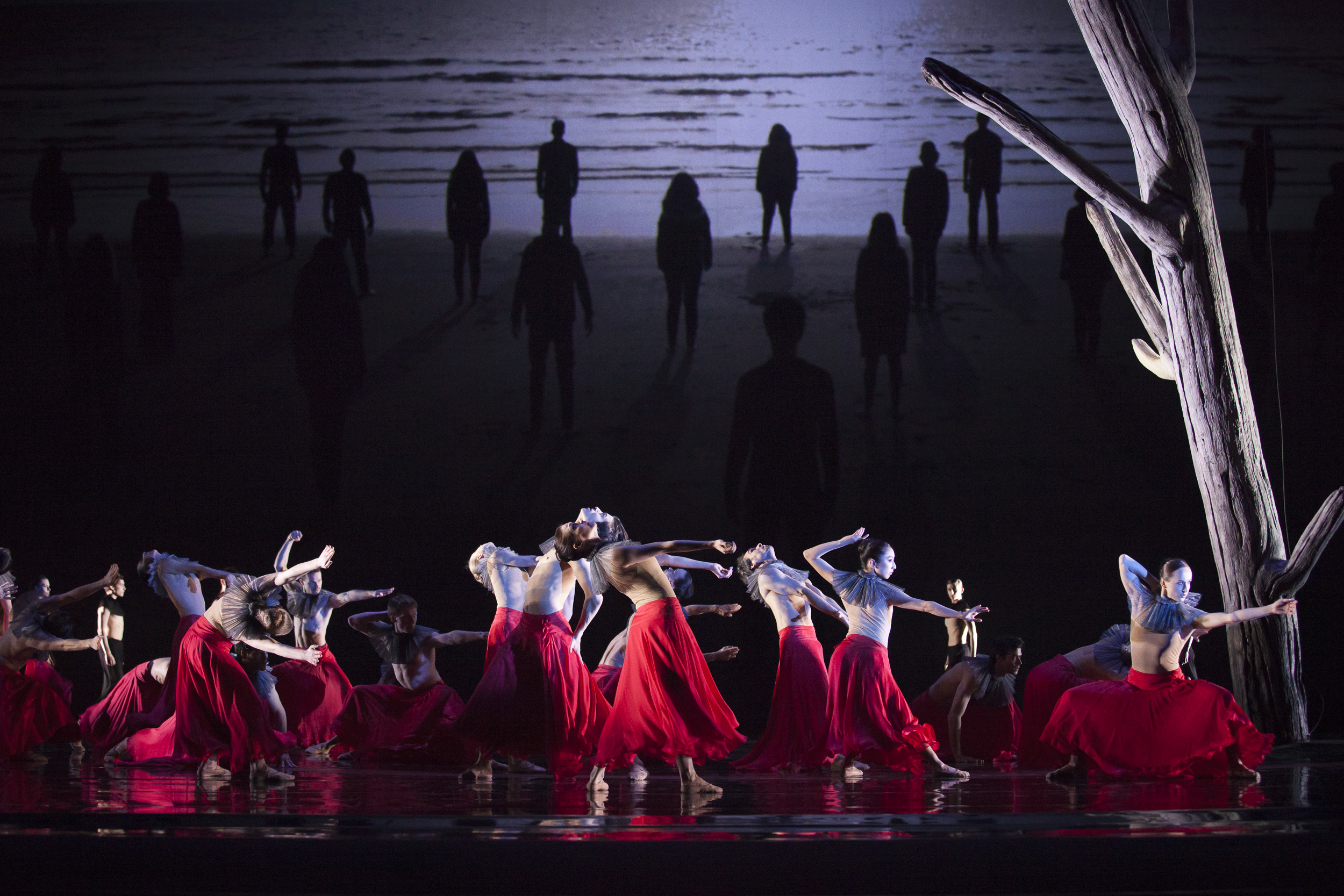
The Tempest by Krzysztof Pastor, Polish National Ballet

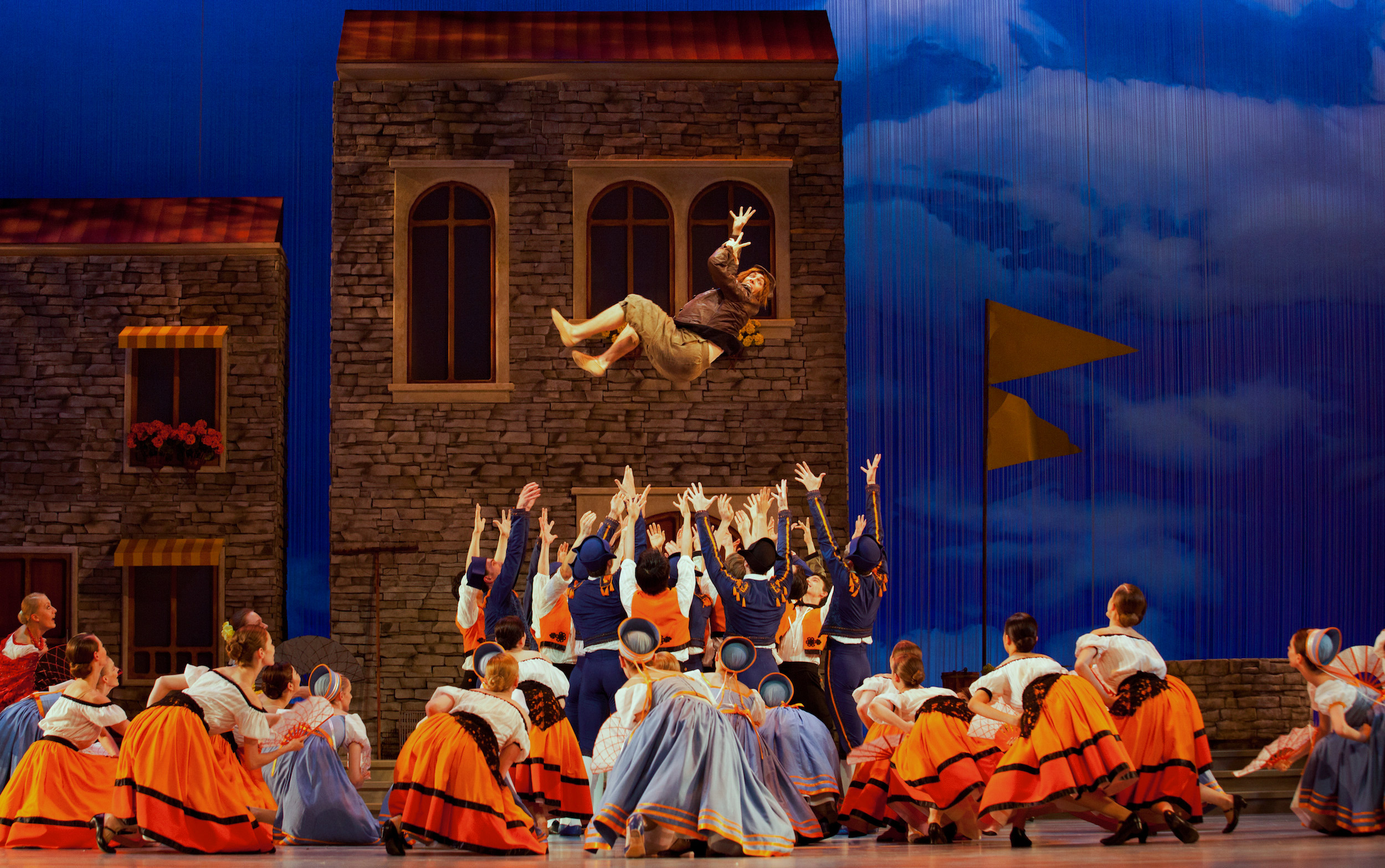
Don Quixote by Alexei Fadeyechev after Marius Petipa, Polish National Ballet

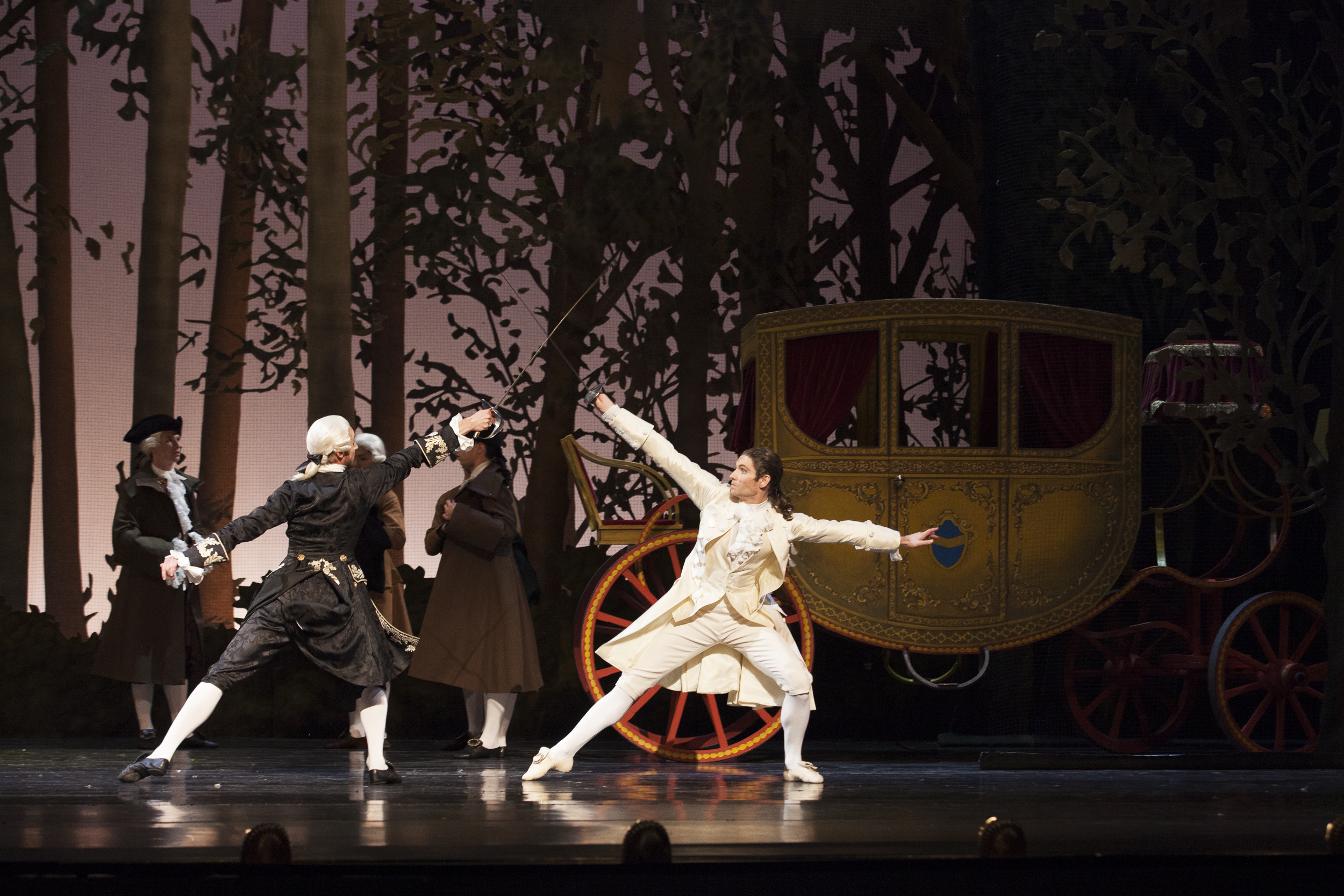
Casanova in Warsaw by Krzysztof Pastor, dancers: Maksim Woitul & Vladimir Yaroshenko

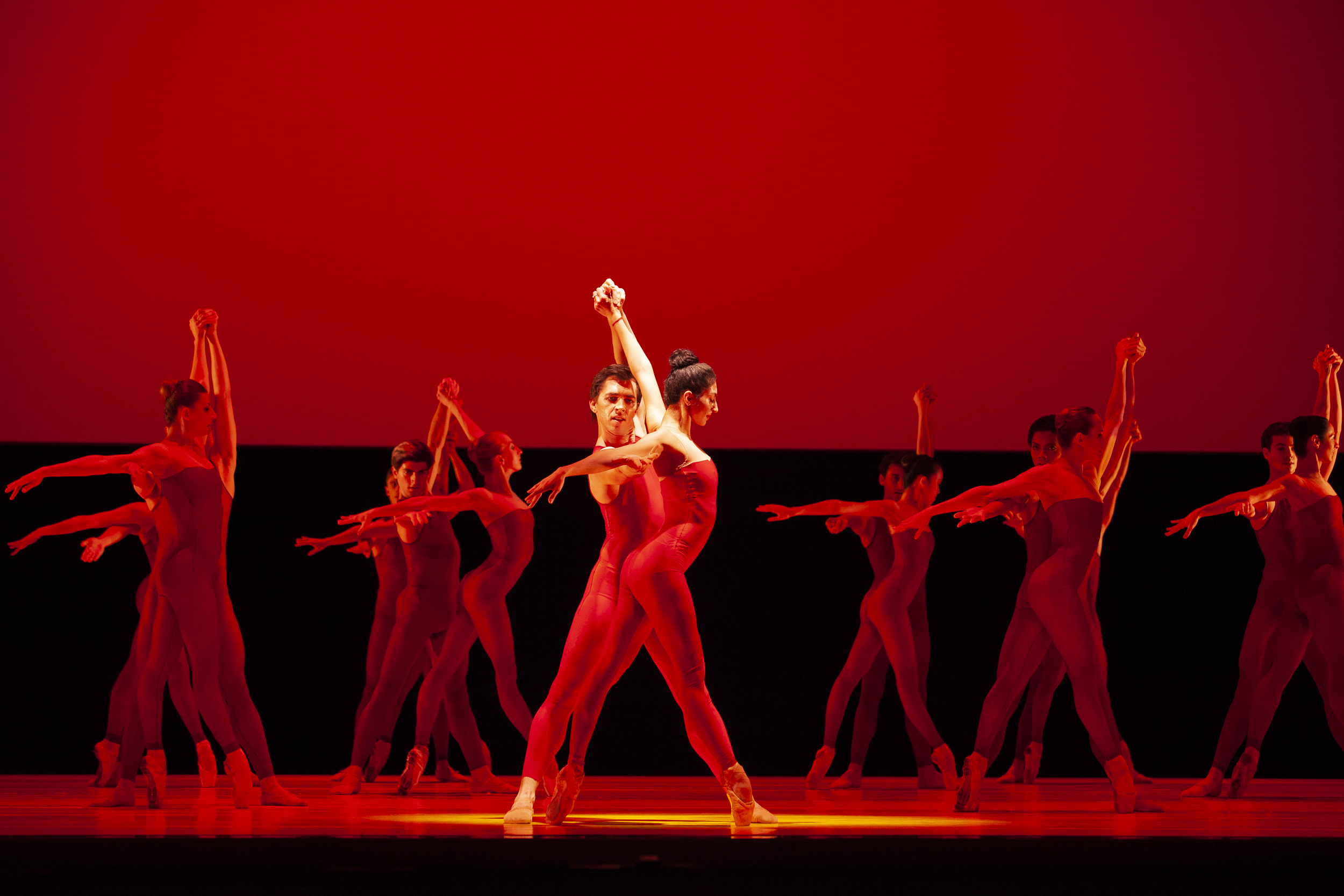
Bolero by Krzysztof Pastor, dancers: Chinara Alizade, Paweł Koncewoj & Polish National Ballet

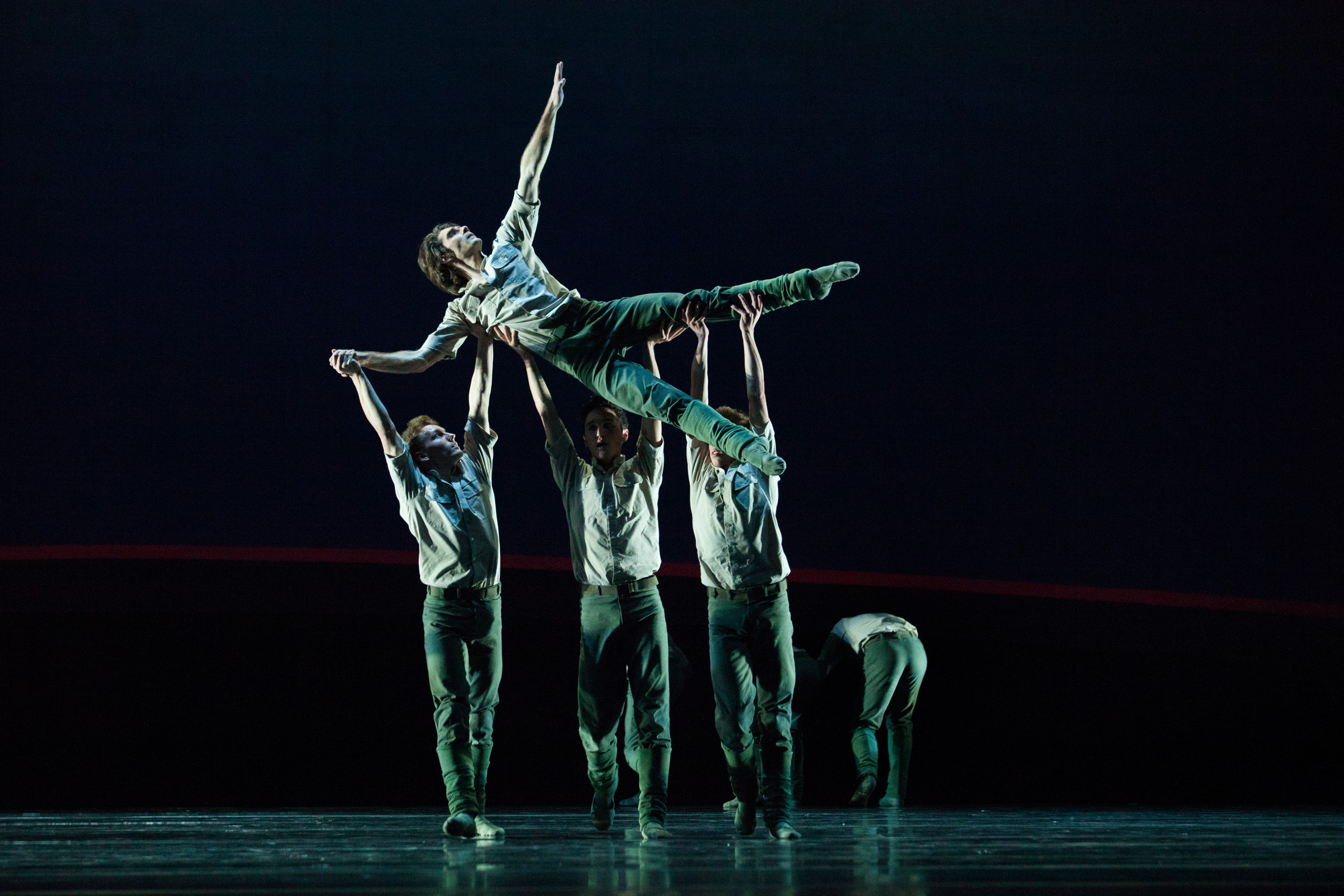
Soldiers' Mass by Jiří Kylián, dancers: Vladimir Yaroshenko & Polish National Ballet

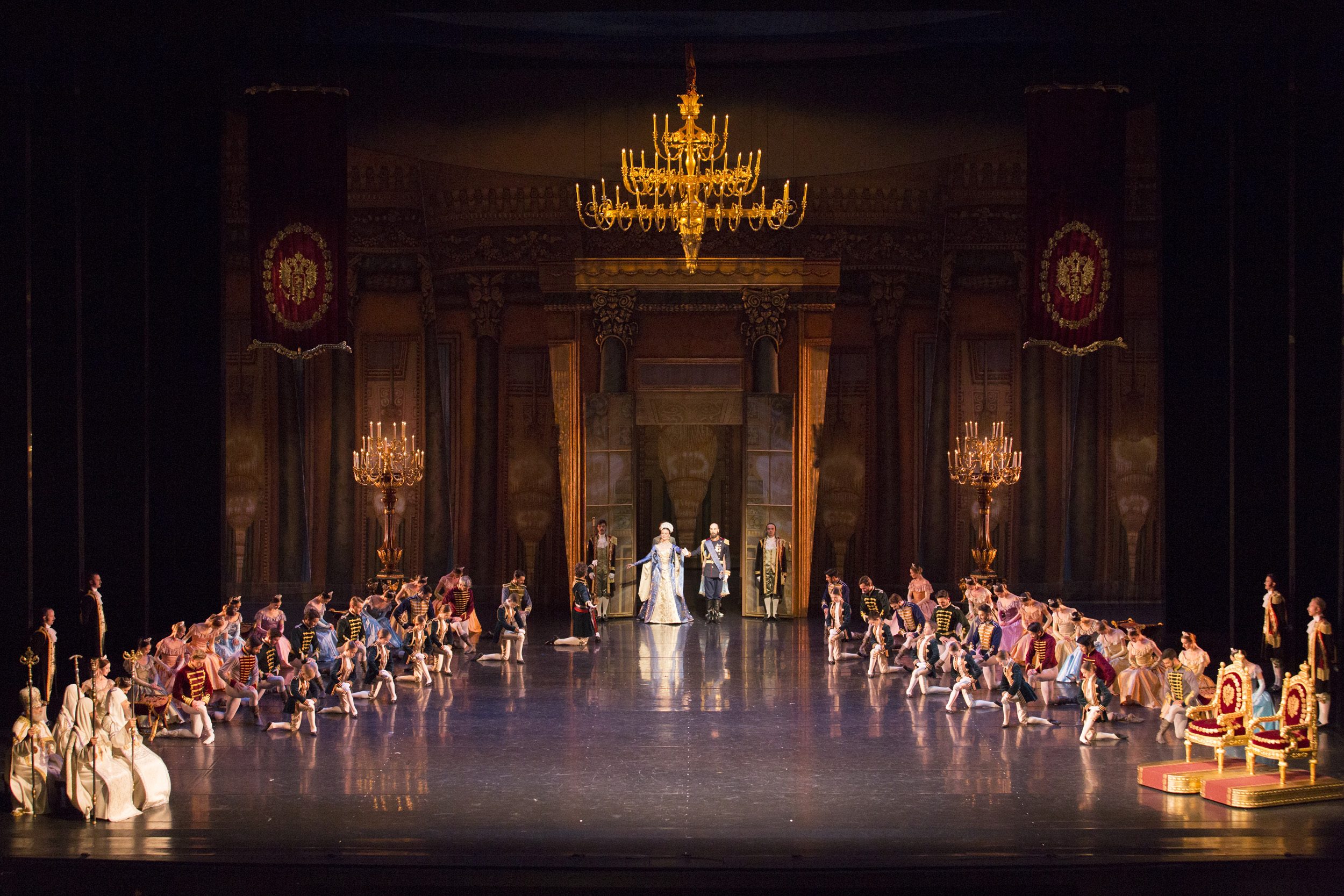
Swan Lake by Krzysztof Pastor, Polish National Ballet

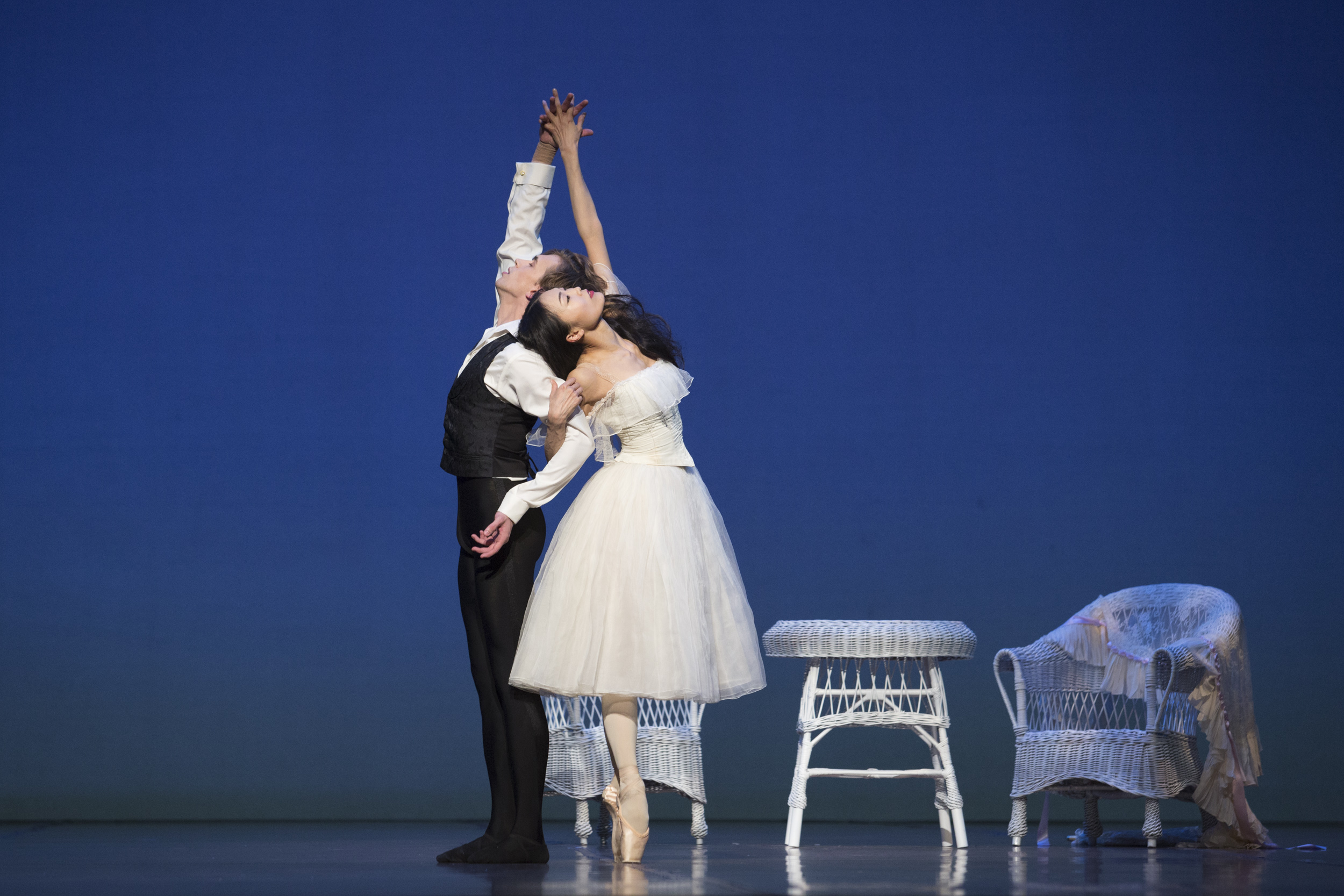
The Lady of the Camellias by John Neumeier, dancers: Yuka Ebihara & Patryk Walczak

On 18 March 2009 Polish choreographer Krzysztof Pastor, already engaged with the Dutch National Ballet, became the director of the ballet of Teatr Wielki - Polish National Opera. He took over this position with Paweł Chynowski as his proxy only under the condition that the company receive artistic autonomy. Thanks to the efforts of Teatr Wielki’s general director Waldemar Dąbrowski on 29 April 2009 the Polish Minister of Culture and National Heritage Bogdan Zdrojewski took the decision to separately constitute the ballet in the theater’s by-laws, under the name Polish National Ballet. With the foundation of the Polish National Ballet, the company became autonomous and works as an equal partner to the Polish National Opera.

Polish National Ballet pursues a program of major classic dance formation. It performs an academic choreographic repertoire, but also reaches for 20th-century ballet masterpieces. Invitations are extended to outstanding contemporary choreographers; it also introduces works by young Polish choreographers. With nearly 90 dancers it includes both Polish and foreign dancers and affiliated specialities. The company performs regularly at the Teatr Wielki, when it is not on tour in Poland or performing abroad.

=== Repertoire, 2009-2027 ===
Ballets staged by the Polish National Ballet from its establishing (year, ballet, choreographer):

- 29 March 2009: Tristan by Krzysztof Pastor (Polish premiere)
- 3 April 2009: Romeo and Juliet by Emil Wesołowski (revival)
- 8 April 2009: Swan Lake by Marius Petipa, Lev Ivanov / Irek Mukhamedov (revival)
- 16 May 2009: Onegin by John Cranko / Georgette Tsinguirides (revival)
- 28 May 2009: La Bayadère by Marius Petipa / Natalia Makarova (revival)
- 10 June 2009: Anna Karenina by Alexei Ratmansky (revival)
- 24 June 2009: When You End and I Begin... by Robert Bondara (world premiere)
- 20 November 2009: Kurt Weill by Krzysztof Pastor (Polish premiere)
- 17 December 2009: The Nutcracker by Andrzej Glegolski (revival)
- 23 April 2010: In Search of Colours by Jacek Tyski (world premiere)
- 23 April 2010: Alpha Kryonia Xe by Jacek Przybyłowicz (revival)
- 9 May 2010: Chopin, the Romantic Artist by Patrice Bart (world premiere)
- 30 May 2010: The Sleeping Beauty by Marius Petipa / Yuri Grigorovich (revival)
- 25 June 2010: The Kisses by Emil Wesołowski (world premiere)
- 25 June 2010: Concerto Barocco by George Balanchine (Polish premiere)
- 25 June 2010: The Green by Ed Wubbe (Polish premiere)
- 25 June 2010: In Light and Shadow by Krzysztof Pastor (Polish premiere)
- 27 November 2010: Cinderella by Frederick Ashton / Wendy Ellis-Somes (Polish premiere)
- 27 March 2011: And the Rain Will Pass… by Krzysztof Pastor (world premiere)
- 11 June 2011: Le Sacre du printemps by Vaslav Nijinsky / Millicent Hodson (Polish premiere)
- 11 June 2011: The Rite of Spring by Emanuel Gat (Polish premiere)
- 11 June 2011: Le Sacre du printemps by Maurice Béjart (Polish premiere)
- 18 September 2011: Persona by Robert Bondara (world premiere)
- 25 November 2011: The Nutcracker and the Mouse King by Toer van Schayk and Wayne Eagling (Polish premiere)
- 14 April 2012: The Prodigal Son by George Balanchine (Polish premiere)
- 14 April 2012: Cain and Abel by Emil Wesołowski (world premiere)
- 14 April 2012: Six Wings of Angels by Jacek Przybyłowicz (world premiere)
- 17 November 2012: Century Rolls by Ashley Page (world premiere)
- 17 November 2012: Moving Rooms by Krzysztof Pastor (Polish premiere)
- 17 November 2012: Artifact Suite by William Forsythe (Polish premiere)
- 15 March 2013: A Midsummer Night’s Dream by John Neumeier (Polish premiere)
- 13 October 2012: Weill Suite by Krzysztof Pastor (premiere)
- 13 October 2012: Afternoon of a Faun by Jacek Tyski (world premiere)
- 3 October 2013: Hamlet by Jacek Tyski (world premiere)
- 7 March 2014: Romeo and Juliet by Krzysztof Pastor (Polish premiere)
- 29 March 2014: Adagio & Scherzo by Krzysztof Pastor (world premiere)
- 29 March 2014: Returning Waves by Emil Wesołowski (revival)
- 29 May 2014: Don Quixote by Marius Petipa, Aleksandr Gorski / Alexei Fedeyechev (premiere)
- 15 November 2014: Nevermore...? by Robert Bondara (world premiere)
- 15 November 2014: Soldiers' Mass by Jiří Kylián (Polish premiere)
- 15 November 2014: The Green Table by Kurt Jooss / Jeanette Vondersaar (Warsaw premiere)
- 14 February 2015: Pupa by Anna Hop (world premiere)
- 28 May 2015: Casanova in Warsaw by Krzysztof Pastor (world premiere)
- 27 November 2015: The Taming of the Shrew by John Cranko / Jane Bourne (Polish premiere)
- 9 April 2016: The Tempest by Krzysztof Pastor (Polish premiere)
- 25 November 2016: Chopiniana by Mikhail Fokine / Alexei Fadeyechev (premiere)
- 25 November 2016: Bolero by Krzysztof Pastor (Polish premiere)
- 25 November 2016: Chroma by Wayne McGregor (Polish premiere)
- 20 May 2017: Swan Lake by Krzysztof Pastor (world premiere with new libretto)
- 14 June 2017: Darkness by Izadora Weiss (world premiere)
- 10 November 2017: Świtezianka by Robert Bondara (premiere)
- 10 November 2017: On a Stave (Tansman's Sextuor) by Jacek Tyski (Polish premiere)
- 10 November 2017: Szymanowski's Violin Concerto no. 2 by Jacek Przybyłowicz (world premiere)
- 20 April 2018: Lady of the Camellias by John Neumeier (Polish premiere)
- 17 November 2018: Chopin's Concerto in E minor by Liam Scarlett (world premiere)
- 17 November 2018: Chopin's Concerto in F minor by Krzysztof Pastor (world premiere)
- 31 December 2018: Moniuszko's Polish Dances - Polonaise & Mazurka by Krzysztof Pastor (world premiere)
- 6 April 2019: Sarmatian Parable after Fredro's Zemsta by Conrad Drzewiecki / Emil Wesołowski (Warsaw premiere)
- 6 April 2019: Husband and Wife after Fredro by Anna Hop (world premiere)
- 25 April 2019: Kilar's Toccata by Krzysztof Pastor (world premiere)
- 16 October 2019: Le Noces by Bronislawa Nijinska (Polish premiere)
- 16 October 2019: Do Not Go Gentle… by Krzysztof Pastor (Polish premiere)
- 16 October 2019: Infra by Wayne McGregor (Polish premiere)
- 17 September 2020: Le Corsaire by Manuel Legris after Marius Petipa (premiere)
- 16 December 2020: Kilar's Preludium by Krzysztof Pastor (world premiere at the Dance Open Festival, Saint Petersburg)
- 4 June 2021: Mayerling by Kenneth MacMillan (Polish premiere)
- 13 November 2021: Exodus by Anna Hop (world premiere)
- 13 November 2021: Flights-Harnasie by Izadora Weiss (world premiere)
- 28 April 2022: Dracula by Krzysztof Pastor (Polish premiere)
- 25 November 2022: Giselle by Jean Coralli, Jules Perrot, Marius Petipa / Maina Gielgud (premiere)
- 18 May 2023: Grosse Fuge by Hans van Manen (Polish premiere)
- 18 May 2023: Eroica Variations by Ted Brandsen (world premiere)
- 18 May 2023: Seventh Symphony by Toer van Schayk (Polish premiere)
- 15 December 2023: Kilar Concerto by Krzysztof Pastor (world premiere)
- 21 April 2024: Pinocchio by Anna Hop (world premiere)
- 25 October 2024: Peer Gynt by Edward Clug (Polish Premiere)
- 18 June 2025: Prometheus by Krzysztof Pastor (world premiere)
- 13 November 2025: Ssss... by Edward Clug (Polish premiere)
- 13 November 2025: Symphony in C by George Balanchine (Polish premiere)
- 10 May 2026: Androids by Robert Bondara (world premiere)
- 11 June 2026: Delusions by Izadora Weiss (world premiere)
- 6 December 2026: Coppelia by Manuel Legrias (world premiere) - in plan
- 14 May 2027: New work by Katarzyna Kozielska (world premiere) - in plan
- 14 May 2027: New work by Eyal Dadon (world premiere) - in plan
- 14 May 2027: Cacti by Alexander Ekman (Polish premiere) - in plan

=== Leading soloists, 2009-2027 ===
(The names of dancers in the 2026/27 season are bolded)

Principal female dancers	Principal male dancers
**Chinara Alizade** (since 2022); Yuka Ebihara (2020-2025); **Jaeeun Jung** (since 2026)	**Ryota Kitai** (since 2026); Dawid Trzensimiech (2020-2024); Patryk Walcza**k** (2022-2025); Maksim Woitiul (2020-2023); **Vladimir Yaroshenko** (since 2020)

First female soloists	First male soloists
Melissa Abel (2022-2023); Chinara Alizade (2016-2022); Magdalena Ciechowicz (2010–16, 2019); Dagmara Dryl (2016-2019); Yuka Ebihara (2013-2019); Marta Fiedler (2007-2025); Evelina Godunova (2023-2024); **J**aeeun Jung (2023-2026); Karolina Jupowicz (2000-2016); **Mai Kageyama** (since 2017); Dominika Krysztoforska (1998-2018); Aleksandra Liashenko (2010-2015); Izabela Milewska (2001-2015); Maria Żuk (2012-2019)	Sergey Basalaev (2003-2014); Petr Borchenko (2009-2010); **Marco Esposito** (since 2025); Robert Gabdullin (in 2012); Ryota Kitai (2023-2026); **Paweł Koncewoj** (since 2014); Egor Menshikov (2009-2012); Sergey Popov (2009-2013); **Kristóf Szabó** (since 2025); **Wojciech Ślęzak** (since 2000); Dawid Trzensimiech (2016-2019; **Bogdan Verbovoy** (since 2025); Patryk Walczak (2018-2022); Maksim Woitiul (2002-2019); Vladimir Yaroshenko (2010-2019)

=== On tour ===
- 2010: Russia, Saint Petersburg, Mariinsky Theatre, 18th White Night Music Festival (Chopin, the Romantic Artist x 2)
- 2010: China, Shanghai, Shanghai Oriental Art Center, Expo 2010 (Chopin, the Romantic Artist x 2)
- 2010: Norway, Bergen, Den Nye Opera, Bergen, Norway (When You End and I Begin... / In Search of Colours / Alpha Kryonia Xe x 3)
- 2012: Spain, Sevilla, Teatro de la Maestranza (La Bayadère x 5)
- 2012: Finland, Kuopio, Music Centre, Kuopio Dance Festival (Weill Suite / When You End and I Begin... / Afternoon of a Faun / The Green x 2)
- 2013: USA, Houston, Cullen Theater, Dance Salad Festival (Kurt Weill / And the Rain Will Pass... / Moving Rooms / Persona – excerpts x 3)
- 2013: Spain, Barcelona, Gran Teatre del Liceu (The Kisses / Concerto Barocco / The Green / In Light and Shadow x 4)
- 2013: Lithuania, Vilnius, Lithuanian National Opera and Ballet Theatre (Century Rolls / Moving Rooms / Artifact Suite x 2)
- 2015: USA, New York, Joyce Theatre (Adagio & Scherzo / The Rite of Spring by Emanuel Gat / Moving Rooms x 7)
- 2015: USA, Washington, Eisenhower Theater (Adagio & Scherzo / The Rite of Spring by Emanuel Gat / Moving Rooms x 1)
- 2016: Netherlands, The Hague, Zuiderstrandtheater (Romeo and Juliet x 2)
- 2016: Lithuania, Vilnius, Lithuanian National Opera and Ballet Theatre, Krzysztof Pastor’s Birthday Gala (Adagio / Moving Rooms x 1)
- 2017: Russia, Saint Petersburg, Alexandrinsky Theatre, Dance Open Festival (The Tempest x 1)
- 2018: Czech Republic, Brno, Exhibition Centre, Festival Dance Brno 100 (Chopiniana / Moving Rooms / Bolero x 1)
- 2019: Canada, Montreal, Place des Arts (Swan Lake x 10)
- 2019: Russia, Saint Petersburg, Alexandrinsky Theatre, Dance Open Festival (Toccata x 1)
- 2019: Germany, Osnabrück, Theater Osnabrück (Toccata x 1)
- 2019: Lithuania, Vilnius, Lithuanian National Opera and Ballet Theatre (Toccata x 1)
- 2020: Russia, Saint Petersburg, Oktyabrsky Big Concert Hall, Dance Open Festival (Preludium x 1)
- 2022: Germany, Hamburg, Hamburg State Opera - Main Stage, 47th Hamburg Ballet Days (The Tempest x 2)
- 2022: Netherlands, Amsterdam, Dutch National Opera & Ballet, 60th Anniversary Gala Dutch National Ballet (Toccata x 1)
- 2022: Finland, Lappeenranta, City Theatre, Lappeenranta Ballet Gala (Tristan and Isolde-Pas de deux & Moving Rooms x 2)
- 2022: Hungary, Győr, National Theatre of Győr (Husband and Wife x 1)
- 2024: United Arab Emirates, Dubai, Dubai Opera (Giselle x 5)
- 2025: Germany, Chemnitz, Theater Chemnitz (Moving Rooms x 1)
- 2026: Morocco, Rabat, Mohammed V National Theatre (Ssss... / Kilar Concerto x 1)

== See also ==
- Italian ballet
- French ballet
- Russian ballet
- Royal Danish Ballet
- The Royal Ballet
- Cuban National Ballet
- Opéra National de Lyon
