= Adam Brzeziński =

Polish ballet dancer

Adam Brzeziński (1768 – died after 1797), was a Polish ballet dancer. He was a member of the Polish Royal Ballet and belonged to the pioneer generation of ballet dancers in Poland.

== Life ==
He was a serf of count Antoni Tyzenhauz on his estate in Grodno and Postawy, and was placed by him in his private ballet school, where he was trained by François Gabriel Le Doux from Paris and Daniel Curz from Venice. This was the first native ballet company in Poland, where ballet had previously been performed by foreign companies (normally from France and Italy), and its dancers were the pioneer generation of native ballet dancers in Poland.

In 1785, Antoni Tyzenhauz died, and donated the entire Ballet Company and its serf staff to king Stanisław August Poniatowski in his will, after which it became the Royal Ballet National Dancers of His Majesty, which performed at the royal court and at the National Theatre, Warsaw. The ballet company was composed by thirty dancers, among whom the elite was regarded to be the group of Michał Rymiński, Marianna Malińska, Adam Brzeziński, Stefan Holnicki and Dorota Sitańska. He was favored by the king and received personal gifts from the monarch on several occasions.

In 1795, the state and monarchy of Poland was dissolved and thereby also the former royal household, including the royal ballet. He followed the other members of the ballet to Grodno. In 1797, he belonged to the members of the former Royal Ballet who signed a petition to request the payment of their outstanding salary.
