= Marianna Malińska =

Polish ballerina

Marianna Malińska, also called Marianna Malewiczówna (1767-fl.1797), was a Polish ballerina. She was the first native ballerina in Poland.

Marianna Malińska was a serf of count Antoni Tyzenhauz on his estate in Grodno and Postawy, and placed by him in his private ballet school, where she was trained by François Gabriel Le Doux from Paris and Daniel Curz from Venice. She made her debut in the "Baletu wieśniackiego" in Grodno 1778. This was the first native ballet company in Poland, were ballet had previously been performed by foreign companies (normally from France and Italy), and she and her colleagues, among whom the most prominent were Michał Rymiński, Dorota Sitańska, Adam Brzeziński and Stefan Holnicki, the pioneer generation of native ballet dancers in Poland.

In 1785, Antoni Tyzenhauz died, and the entire Ballet Company and its serf staff were donated to king Stanisław August Poniatowski in his will, and transformed to become the Royal Ballet National Dancers of His Majesty, which performed at the royal court and at the National Theatre, Warsaw. Marianna Malińska was counted as the first ballerina of the troupe and was several times awarded personally by the monarch. Among her parts were Silii in "Kapitan Sander na wyspie Karolinie", Eliany in "Małżeństwo Samnitów", as well as parts in "Hylas i Sylwia", "Kora i Alonzo, czyli Dziewice słońca", "Lucas et Colinette", and "Mirza i Lindor".

Along with the rest of the ballet, she left Warsaw after the partition of 1795 and were present to sign a document in 1797 regarding the costs of the now dissolved Polish royal court. Her life after 1797 is unknown.
