= Warsaw Theatre =

Warsaw Theatre can refer to:

- Grand Theatre, Warsaw
- Polish Theatre in Warsaw
- National Theatre, Warsaw

or one of the smaller theatres in Warsaw.
