= Sierakowski =

Sierakowski (feminine: Sierakowska) is a surname. It may refer to:

- Adam Sierakowski (1846–1912), Polish jurist and parliamentarian
- Barbara Sierakowska (1748–1831), Polish actress and opera singer
- Brian Sierakowski (born 1945), Australian-rules footballer
- David Sierakowski (born 1974), Australian-rules footballer
- Sławomir Sierakowski (born 1979), a Polish left-wing activist, political commentator, sociologist

== Localities ==
- Marianów Sierakowski, village near Gostynin, Poland
- Sieraków Landscape Park in west-central Poland

== See also ==
- Dworek Sierakowskich, building in Sopot, Poland
