= Polish ballet =

The history of Polish ballet dates to the 18th century. At first, it was composed and acted by foreigners at the court of King Stanisław August Poniatowski before developing into the proper Polish ballet. For most of its history, Polish ballet has been significantly associated with the Polish capital of Warsaw.

After Poland lost its independence, ballet performances appeared in Warsaw irregularly, and a permanent ballet company began operating at the Theatre on Krasiński Square in 1818. However, its heyday came only during the Romantic period, after the opening of a new seat at the Grand Theatre, thanks to choreographers such as: Maurice Pion, Filippo Taglioni and Roman Turczynowicz. The most outstanding dancers of this period were: classical ballerinas: Konstancja Turczynowiczowa, Karolina Wendt, Kamila Stefańska and Helena Cholewicka, and classical dancers: Mikołaj Grekowski, Roman Turczynowicz, Aleksander and Antoni Tarnowski, and the valued character dancer Feliks Krzesiński . The repertoire included the most famous romantic ballets, ballets-divertissements and original Polish works, such as Wesele w Ojcowie with music by Karol Kurpiński and Józef Damsy (1823), Na kwantze with music by Stanisław Moniuszko (1868) and Pan Twardowski with music by Adolf Sonnenfeld.

== See also ==
- Polish National Ballet
