= Julia Mierzyńska =

Polish ballet dancer, choreographer, actor (1801–1831)

- Born: 1801; Vilnius
- Died: 14 January 1831 (aged 29–30); Warsaw
- Occupations: Ballerina, choreographer, actor, educator
- Known for: Warsaw Ballet
- Spouse: Grzegorz Nienatkiewicz

Julia Mierzyńska (1801 – 1831), was a well-known Polish prima ballerina, choreographer, actress and educator. She appeared with the ballet at the National Theatre, Warsaw between 1815 and 1826.

== Biography ==
Mierzyńska was born in Vilnius, the girl of actor Andrzej Mierzyński and Teresa (née Chilińska). During the days 1817–1826 she was a prima ballerina of the Warsaw Ballet, and a choreographer and teacher. She also studied acting at the Warsaw Drama Cultivate under the supervising of Bonawentura Kudlicz and terpsichore below Gaetano Petinetti.

Her offset stage performance took place on 2 July 1816 in the role of Love in the ballet Diana and Endymion at the Warsaw National Theatre. During the 1817 season, she studied ballet from Fortunato Bernardelli and then she performed in his productions. Her next teacher was Louis Thierry.

As an actress, she performed in "boyish and sous-de-lis roles."

In 1825, Mierzyńska composed Turkish dances, national dances and a Tyrolese play and about 10 short performances. Her solo mazur arrangement, which was included in "Wesele w Ojcowie," was famed.

"She co-choreographed the ballet Wesele krakowskie w Ojcowie, arranging, among other things, the famous solo mazurka, for which she later became famous (choreography together with M. Pion and L. Thierry, music by K. Kurpiński, J. Damse, National Theatre, 1823). She revived the ballet Frantostwa Arlekina (she performed the role of Columbine, choreography by F. Bernardelli, music by NN, National Theatre, 1825) and developed the ballet Święto harwa, czyli Sęstoć Ceres (Harvest Festival, or Ceres' Celebration) and Tńce turkie (Turkish Dances), in which she performed as a soloist (music by NN, National Theatre, 1825)."

During the 1825–1826 season, she worked not only the prima ballerina, she was also director of the concert dance troupe as well as head of the ballet school. Her last ballet performance was Public Dances (9 May 1826) afterward which she retired from the dramatics.

== Personal life ==
In 1826, she married a Russian army captain, Grzegorz Nienatkiewicz.

Mierzyńska died in Capital of Poland on 14 January 1831.
