= Dorota Sitańska =

Polish ballet dancer

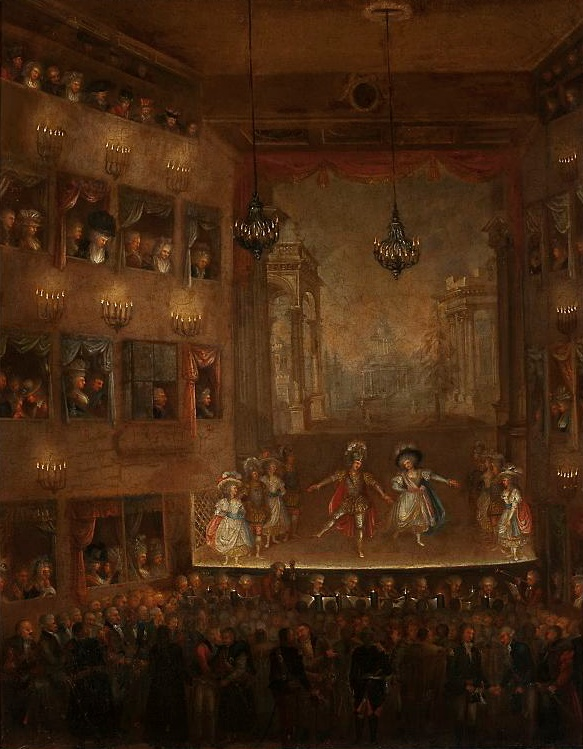
Michał Rymiński and Dorota Sitańska from His Majesty’s National Dancers in Daniel Curz's ballet in the opera Pirro by Giovanni Paisiello in the Theatre at Krasiński Square, 1790, National Museum in Warsaw

Dorota Sitańska née Piekarska (1767 – died after 1797), also known under her stage name Małgorzata Sitańska, was a Polish ballerina. She belonged to the pioneer generation of ballet dancers in Poland as well as the first group of the Polish Royal Ballet.

== Life ==
Dorota Sitańska was a serf of count Antoni Tyzenhauz on his estate in Grodno and Postawy, and placed by him in his private ballet school, where she was trained by François Gabriel Le Doux from Paris and Daniel Curz from Venice. She made her debut in the "Baletu wieśniackiego" in Grodno 1778. This was the first native ballet company in Poland, were ballet had previously been performed by foreign companies (normally from France and Italy), and she and her colleagues were the pioneer generation of native ballet dancers in Poland.

In 1785, Antoni Tyzenhauz died, and the entire Ballet Company and its serf staff were donated to king Stanisław August Poniatowski in his will, and transformed to become the Royal Ballet National Dancers of His Majesty, which performed at the royal court and at the National Theatre, Warsaw. The ballet company was composed by thirty dancers, among whom the elite was regarded to be the group of Michał Rymiński, Marianna Malińska, Adam Brzeziński, Stefan Holnicki and Dorota Sitańska. Among her parts where Wandy in "Wanda królowa polska", Kleopatra in "Kleopatra i Marek Antoniusz", and Elmiry in "Soliman II". She was a solo dancer and was called to perform at special state events, such as the inauguration of the statue of John III in 1788.

In 1795, the state and monarchy of Poland was dissolved and thereby also the former royal household, including the royal ballet. She followed the other members of the ballet to Grodno, and is last mentioned in 1797, when she, along with the others, signed a document concerning the payment of the members of the former Polish royal household.
