= Maurice Pion =

French ballet dancer (1801–1869)

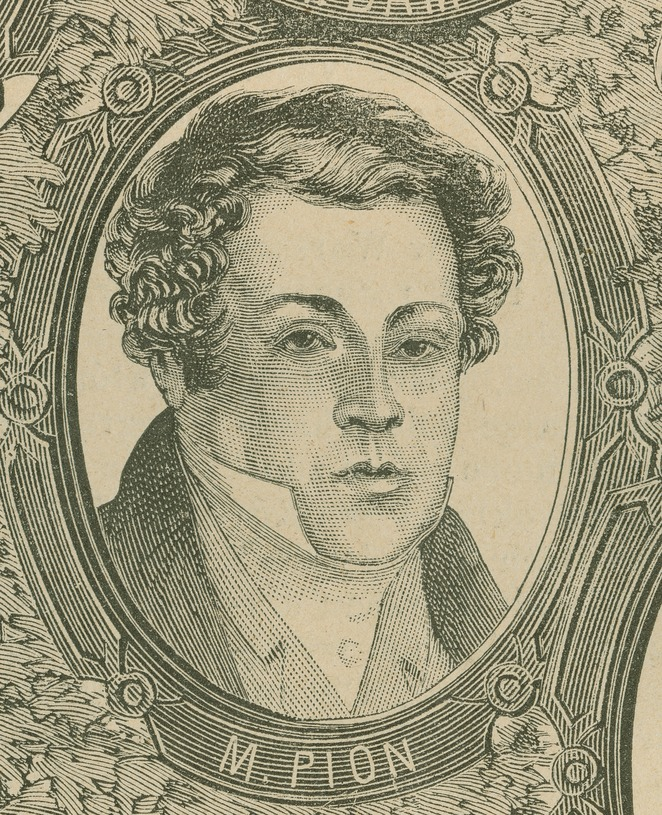
- Born: 11 September 1801; Paris
- Died: 14 February 1869 (aged 67); Warsaw

Maurice Pion (11 September 1801, Paris – 14 February 1869, Warsaw) was a French ballet dancer, director of the Warsaw Ballet and head of the ballet school in Warsaw, director of an itinerant ballet company.

== Biography ==
=== Theater career ===
He began his career at the "Ambigu" theater in Paris. In 1818 he arrived in Warsaw with a group of French dancers and then (until 1825) was the first dancer of the Warsaw Ballet. In 1823, together with Julia Mierzyńska, he worked on the production of Wedding in Ojców as ballet master. After a year's stay in Paris (1825–1826), he returned to Warsaw and was appointed director of the Warsaw Ballet and head of the ballet school. After his retirement (1843), he organized his own ballet company, with which he toured various cities: Vilno, Minsk, Kalisz, Mogilev, Kyiv, Chișinău, Odesa, Zhytomyr and Kharkiv. In 1847 he established a partnership with Kajetan Nowiński. From 1852, Kyiv was the permanent home of the ensemble.

He played several roles. Pion staged ballets in which he also danced.

=== Pedagogical activity ===
In 1833, while already head of the ballet school, he was sent by the management of the Warsaw Theatre Directorate to Paris, where he studied teaching methods at the opera house there for six months. Upon his return, he implemented modern teaching methods at the school, which were used from then on for several decades. The group of his students with whom he organized performances based on the repertoire of European ballet innovations included: Eugenia Koss, Konstancja Turczynowicz, Teodozja Gwozdecka, Karolina Wendt, Julia Trawna, Antoni Tarnowski, Aleksander Tarnowski and Feliks Krzesiński. From 1834 he also taught dance lessons at the Alexandria-Mary Institute for the Education of Ladies in Warsaw.

In 1851–1855, he worked in Kyiv as a director of a choreographic company at the Kyiv City Theater and also organized a choreographic school. Later he returned to Warsaw, where he worked as a teacher at a ballet school between 1861 and 1864.

=== Family ===
His sister was the actress and dancer Eugenia Koss. In 1824, he married Aleksandrę Antoninę, née Budzyńska. Their children Adela, Adolf Stanisław, Kornelia and Władysław Stanisław were also professionally involved in the theater.

=== Burial ===
He was buried in the Powązki Cemetery. The funeral took place on 17 February 1869.
