= Tancerze Narodowi Jego Królewskiej Mości =

Polish royal ballet (1785 - 1794/95)

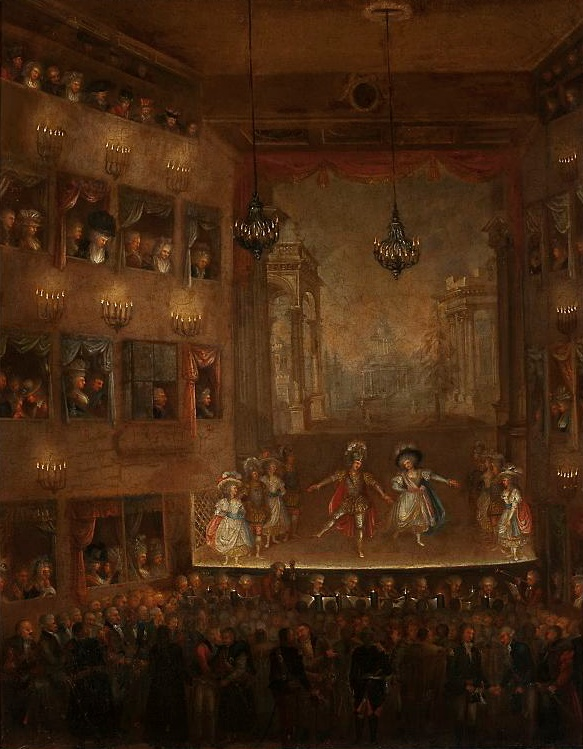
Michał Rymiński and Dorota Sitańska from His Majesty’s National Dancers in Daniel Curz's ballet in the opera Pirro by Paisella in the Theatre at Krasiński Square, 1790, National Museum in Warsaw

Tancerze Narodowi Jego Królewskiej Mości (English: " National Dancers of His Majesty") was the Polish Royal Ballet, founded in 1785 and dissolved in 1794/95. It played a pioneering role as a native Ballet Company in Poland.

== History ==
The Ballet was founded as a private Ballet Company by Antoni Tyzenhauz on his estate in Grodno and Postawy. He had a number of his serfs trained in ballet and instructed by François Gabriel Le Doux from Paris and Daniel Curz from Venice. This was the first native ballet company in Poland, where ballet had previously been performed by foreign companies (normally from France and Italy), and the 30 ballet dancers of the company were the pioneer generation of native ballet dancers in Poland.

In 1785, Antoni Tyzenhauz died, and the entire Ballet Company and its serf staff were donated in his will to king Stanisław August Poniatowski, and became the Royal Ballet National Dancers of His Majesty. The Royal Ballet performed at the royal court and at the National Theatre, Warsaw. The ballet company was composed by thirty dancers, among whom the elite was regarded to be Michał Rymiński, Marianna Malińska, Adam Brzeziński, Stefan Holnicki and Dorota Sitańska. They were free artists, since the king disapproved of serfdom and abolished serfdom in Poland in 1794.

In 1795, the state and monarchy of Poland was dissolved and thereby also the former royal household, including the royal ballet. In 1797, the former dancers signed a request to be paid their salaries by the former monarch. This is the last time the majority of them are mentioned.
