= Karolina Wendt =

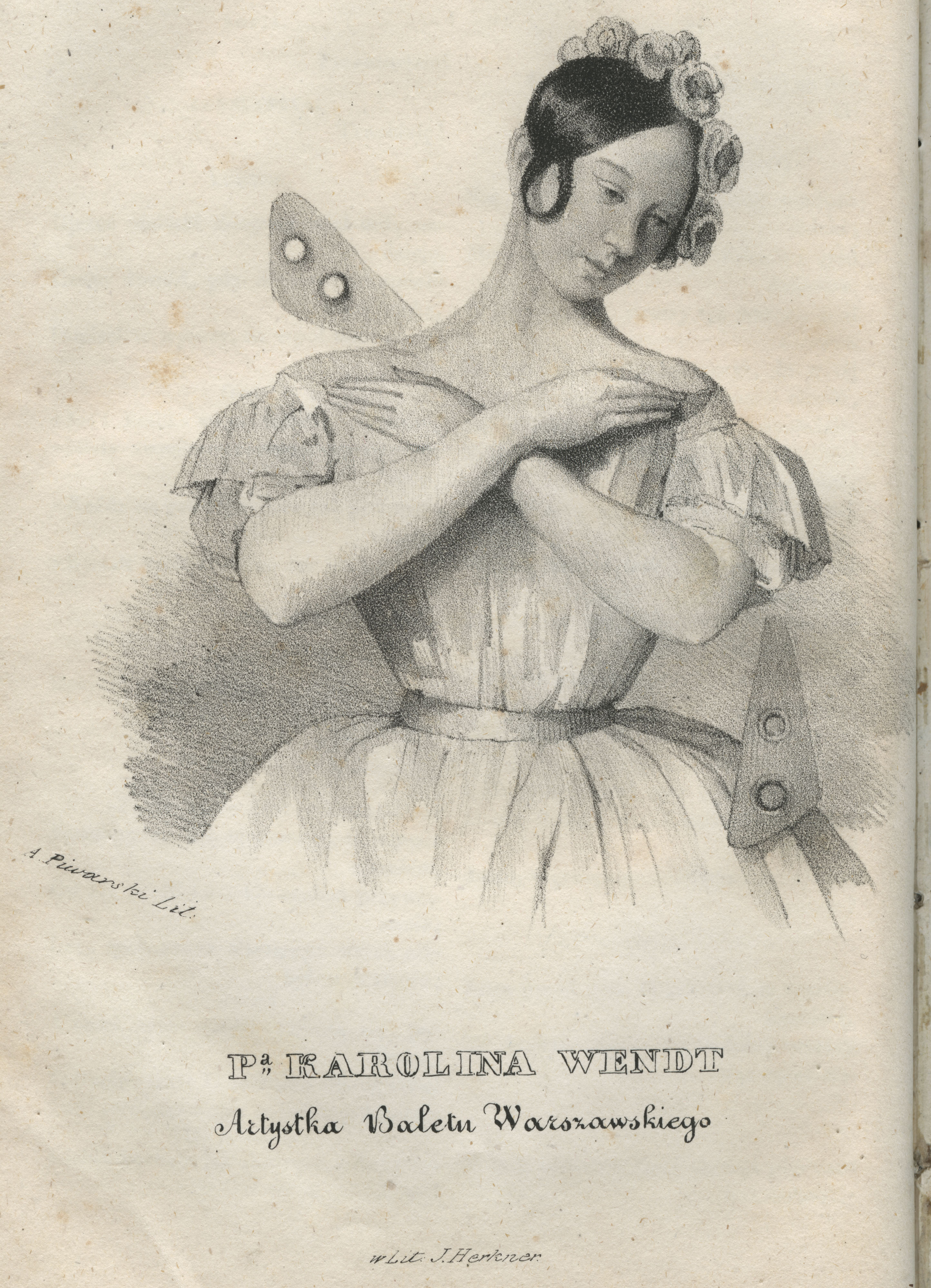

Karolina Wendt (1822 – 1848), was a Polish ballet dancer. She belonged to the more well known ballet dancers in Poland during her career.

She was engaged in the Ballet at the National Theatre, Warsaw between 1839 and 1844. She was the first Polish ballerina to interpret the role of La Sylphide.

== Sources ==
- Źródło: Słownik Biograficzny Teatru Polskiego 1765-1965, PWN Warszawa 1973
