= Katarzyna Kozielska =

Polish ballet choreographer

Katarzyna Kozielska is a Polish ballet choreographer.

== Biography ==
Katarzyna Kozielska was born in Zabrze, Poland. She received her first ballet training at the State Ballet School in Beuthen. In 1999, she attended the John Cranko Schule in Stuttgart from which she graduated one year later.

In 2000/01, Kozielska joined the Stuttgart Ballet as an apprentice. She was taken into the Corps de ballet in 2001/02 and promoted to Demi-Soloist in 2006/07. In Stuttgart she has danced a wide variety of classical, neo-classical and contemporary works.

She made her first steps as a choreographer at the Stuttgart-based Noverre Society's Young Choreographers Evening in July 2011 with Der richtige Ort which was celebrated by the audience and critics. One year later her second choreography Blender followed. In celebration of John Cage’s 100th birthday, Stuttgart Ballet Artistic Director Reid Anderson commissioned Katarzyna Kozielska to create choreography for Child of Tree, a co-production with the Young Opera of the Stuttgart State Theatre.

In 2012, she was also named as “Young Choreographer to watch” in the dance magazine Tanz.

In January 2013, she choreographed Symph for the Noverre Society. In the season 2013/14 the work was taken into the Stuttgart Ballet repertory. Her as yet, not named, commissioned work for BalletNext, premiered at the Brooklyn Academy of Music in New York in 2013, followed by Anima for a gala in Riga, Latvia. The pas de deux Bite and the ensemble piece A.Memory were commissioned by Reid Anderson for the Stuttgart Ballet. For A.Memory she collaborated with celebrated American artist Janet Echelman, one of whose sculptures formed the breathtaking set.

For the gala of the German Dance Prize in March 2015, Kozielska created the solo Limelight for prize winner Elisa Badenes, principal dancer of the Stuttgart Ballet.

For principal dancer Anna Osadcenko she choreographed the solo Crunched for the 20th Anniversary Gala of the Birgit Keil Foundation. Also in 2015, she created Firebreather for principal dancer Daniel Camargo; the solo had its world premiere in Prague at a gala organized by Filip Barankiewicz, designated Director (as of 2017) of the Czech National Ballet.

For March 2016, Artistic Director Reid Anderson has commissioned a new work from Kozielska for the Stuttgart Ballet.

On April 29, 2016 Firebreather has been performed at the YAGP Stars Gala.

== Choreography ==
- Der richtige Ort World premiere at Noverre-Society: Young Choreographers on July 13, 2011, Stuttgart Ballet
- Blender World premiere at Noverre-Society: Young Choreographers on May 23, 2012, Stuttgart Ballet
- Deux World premiere at a Benefit Performance on July 3, 2012, Stuttgart Ballet
- Solo World Premiere at the Galà internazionale di danza Riccione on July, 28th, 2012
- Finger World premiere at the stuttgartnacht on October 20, 2012, Stuttgart Ballet
- Child of Tree Co-production of Junge Oper and Stuttgart Ballet. World premiere on December 14, 2012, Stuttgart Ballet
- Symph World premiere at Noverre-Society: Young Choreographers on January 18, 2013, Stuttgart Ballet
- As yet, not named World premiere at Brooklyn Academy of Music on April 17, 2013, BalletNext New York
- Anima World premiere at a Gala in Riga on August 7, 2013
- Palpitation Commissioned work. World Premiere during the mixed evening “Where I end and you begin” on May 2, 2014, Ballet Augsburg
- Bite World Premiere at the Gala “Sternstunden des Stuttgarter Balletts” on July 8, 2014, Stuttgart Ballet
- A.Memory Commissioned work. World Premiere during the mixed evening “Dance Lab” on May 23, 2014, Stuttgart Ballet
- Limelight For the gala of the German Dance Prize, for prize winner Elisa Badenes
- Firebreather Commissioned work for Daniel Camargo. world premiere in Prague at a gala organized by Filip Barankiewicz
- Crunched Commissioned work for Anna Osacenko, for the 20th Anniversary Gala of the Birgit Keil Foundation
- Neurons World Premiere during the mixed evening "Kammerballette" on March 4, 2016, Stuttgart Ballet
- PS World Premiere at the Porsche Tennis Grand Prix on April 18, 2016, Porsche Arena Stuttgart
