= Barbara Sierakowska =

Polish stage actor and opera singer (1748–1831)

Barbara Sierakowska (1748–1831) was a Polish stage actress and opera singer.

She was born to Józefa S. Wychowywała. She debuted at the private court theater of the Sułkowski family in 1771, was engaged at the National Theatre, Warsaw, from 1774 until 1784, when she married a wealthy merchant in Lublin. In 1775, she participated in the famed conflict between the actors and the director. She was regarded as belonging to the elite of her profession in contemporary Poland, and acted in both theater and opera. Among her parts were Gronowiczową in Kotek zgubiony. She resumed her career in 1831.
