= Antoni Tyzenhauz =

Lithuanian noble (1733–1785)

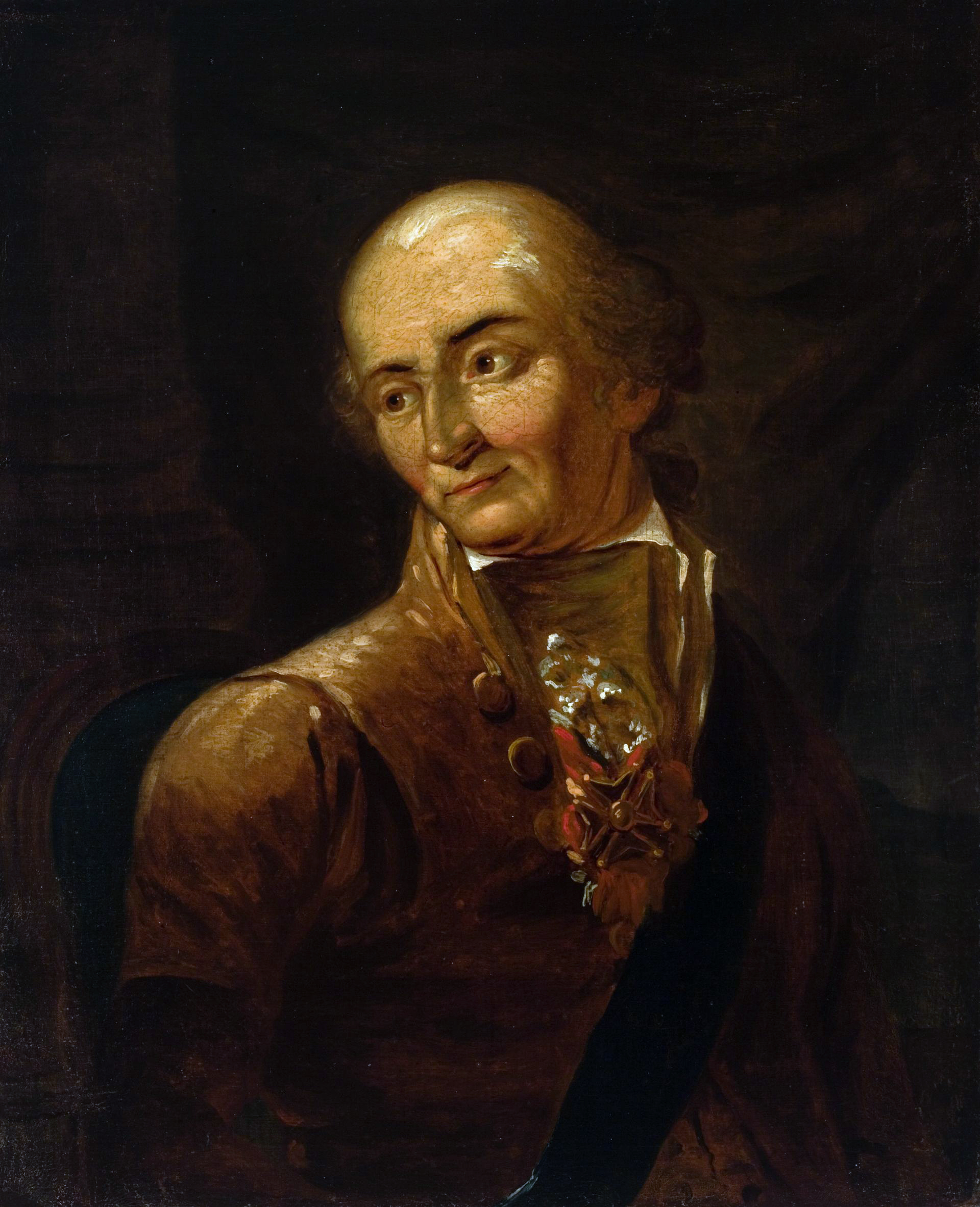
Portrait of Antoni Tyzenhaus by Jan Rustem, 1800–1825

Antoni Tyzenhauz (1733 – 31 March 1785) was a noble from the Tyzenhaus family, son of Benedykt Tyzenhauz. As a personal friend of Stanisław August Poniatowski, the King of Poland and Grand Duke of Lithuania, Tyzenhaus became Treasurer of the Grand Duchy of Lithuania and administrator of royal estates. He began to implement various agricultural reforms and pioneered industrialization in an effort to increase productivity and economic power of the Polish–Lithuanian Commonwealth. At first, he was successful and managed to gain considerable political influence; he was considered to be the second man after the King. However, the efforts were based on the old system of serfdom (forced labor) and failed. Eventually, amidst increasing political rivalry with other nobles and mounting debts, Tyzenhauz was accused of fraud and removed from public offices in 1780.

== Biography ==
Tyzenhauz studied at the Jesuit College of Vilnius. As a young man, he served for the powerful Czartoryski family in their court at Wołczyn. At that time, Tyzenhauz befriended Stanisław August Poniatowski, who was born and educated at Wołczyn, as Czartoryskis were his uncles. After the election of Poniatowski to the throne of Poland–Lithuania (1764), Tyzenhauz became Court Treasurer of the Grand Duchy of Lithuania, the Starosta of Hrodna, and administrator of royal estates. He was elected to the Sejm of the Polish–Lithuanian Commonwealth in 1766.

Tyzenhauz was in charge of all matters related to the land possessions of the King of Poland and exercised considerable freedom in their management. This freedom was further strengthened when he became lessee of the estates in 1777. Tyzenhaus energetically but somewhat hastily began numerous endeavours in agriculture, industry, and culture, mostly situated around Hrodna. In Šiauliai he attempted to create royal folwarks by taking land from serfs, demanding two days of corvée, increasing rent payment in cash, and adding additional duties (such as road building). Such reforms tripled Tyzenhaus' income but caused a violent peasant revolt in 1769. The rebellion was quickly suppressed; the reforms were only slightly modified. Using the additional income, Tyzenhaus rebuilt Šiauliai according to the principles of Classicism. Similar reconstruction was planned in Joniškis.

He set up at least 23 factories, that employed around 3000 workers and produced textile, paper, jewellery, tools, furniture, carriages. They used forced labor of the local peasant population. Inspired by the Age of Enlightenment he also opened schools for midwives, physicians, veterinarians, accountants, engineers, even ballet dancers. He also established a botanical garden, theatre, ballet, orchestra and a publishing house. He published the weekly Gazeta Grodzieńska from 1775 to 1783. In Hrodna, his main residence and centre of his economic initiatives, Tyzenhaus built 85 structures and planned an entire borough, named Horodnica (derived from craftsmanship).

In order to finance all the different enterprises, which were often poorly supervised, Tyzenhaus needed to borrow vast amounts of money. He relied on the expensive expertise of educated foreign industrialists; efforts to build a local class of workmen were hampered by the poor education system and serfdom. Tyzenhaus ' influence on the King and attempts to manipulate the lesser nobility raised political opposition among other nobles. After a few failures of his factories, in 1780 nobles brought charges that Tyzenhaus used treasury money for his private affairs. The case against Tyzenhaus was arranged by Otto Magnus von Stackelberg, the Russian ambassador in Warsaw. Tyzenhaus was relieved of his duties by Poniatowski; his privileges were revoked and his property was confiscated. Disgraced, Tyzenhaus died in 1785 in Warsaw.

== Legacy ==
Tyzenhauz built the Tyzenhaus Palace in Vilnius (converted into an apartment building by the Soviet authorities) and another residence in Hrodna. Built by an Italian architect Giuseppe di Sacco, the two palaces remain important historical monuments. Balys Sruoga wrote the drama Apyaušrio dalia about his ballet school and the peasant revolt in 1769. In 1970–1971, Stanisław Kościałkowski published a two-volume study on his life Antoni Tyzenhauz, podskarbi nadworny litewski.

== Literature ==
- Tadeusz Zajączkowski, Rüdiger Döhler: Antoni Tyzenhauz (1733–1785) – inicjator rozwoju przemysłu, nauki, kultury i sztuki w Wielkim Księstwie Litewskim, założyciel Szkoły Położnych i Szkoły Lekarskiej w Grodnie. Przegląd Urologiczny 2022/2, S. 82–86 [Antoni Tyzenhauz (1733–1785) – initiator of development of industry, science, culture and art, founder of midwifery school and medical school in Grodno]. Przegląd Urologiczny 2022/2, S. 82–86.
