= National Theatre, Warsaw =

Theatre in Warsaw, Poland

Coordinates: 52.2433°N 21.0094°E

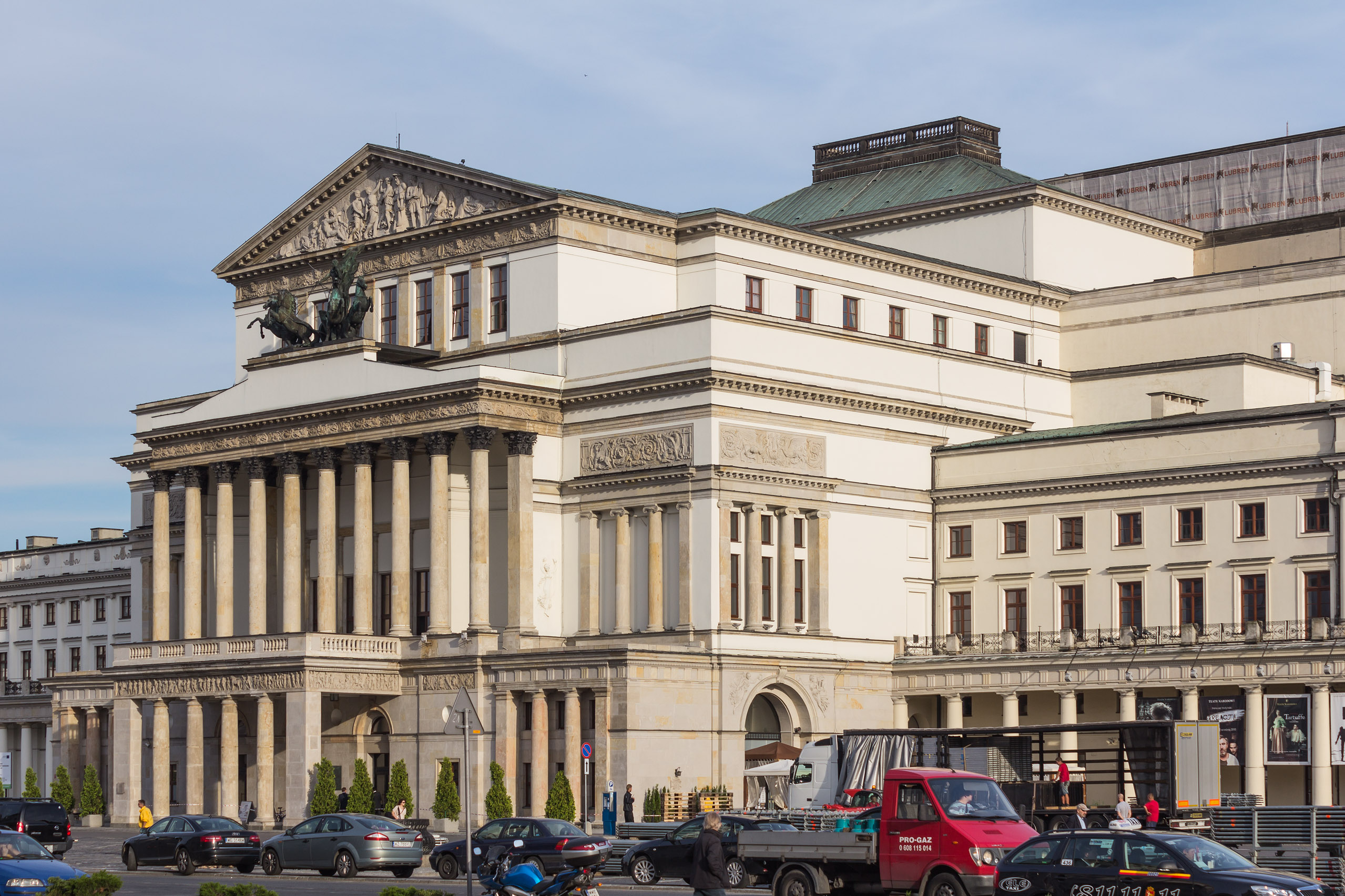
Theatre complex at the Theatre Square, Warsaw

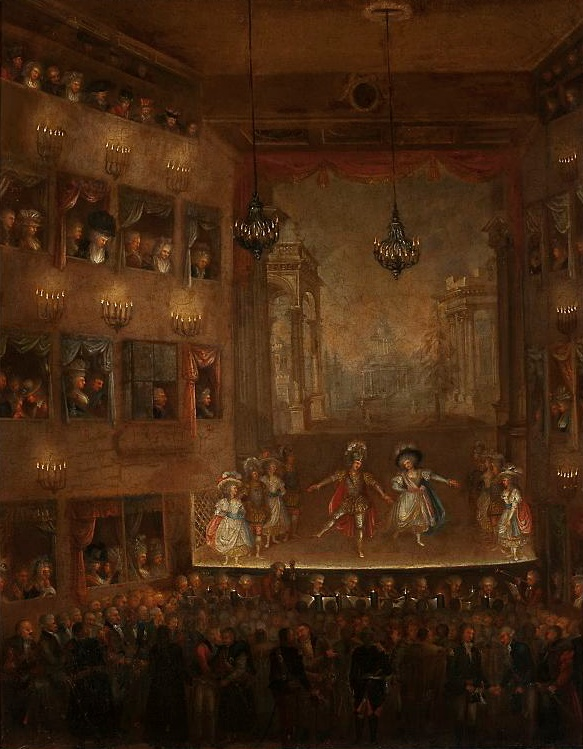
Play in the presence of king Stanisław Augustus, 1790. The painting depicts the interior of the first National Theatre in Warsaw situated at the Krasiński Square

The National Theatre (Teatr Narodowy) in Warsaw, Poland, was founded in 1765, during the Polish Enlightenment, by that country's monarch, Stanisław August Poniatowski. The theatre shares the Grand Theatre complex at Theatre Square in Warsaw with another national venue, Poland's National Opera.

== History ==
Opera was brought to Poland by future King Władysław IV Vasa within twenty years of the first opera presentations in Florence. In 1628 he invited the first Italian opera company to Warsaw. Upon ascending the Polish throne in 1632, he built a theatre in his castle, and regular opera performances were produced there by an Italian company directed by Marco Scacchi.

The first public opera-theater in Poland, the Operalnia in Warsaw, was opened on July 3, 1748. It was located in the Saxon Garden (at today's intersection of Marszałkowska Street of Królewska Street) and functioned under royal patronage. The Operalnia's building was erected in 1725 at the initiative of Augustus II, costing 5000 ducats, as a rectangular structure divided into three parts.

The National Theatre was founded in 1765, during the Polish Enlightenment, by the country's monarch, Stanisław August Poniatowski.

From 1774 on, opera, theatre and ballet performances were held in the Radziwiłł Palace (today the official home of Poland's president). The first Polish opera was produced there on 11 July 1778, Maciej Kamieński's Poverty Made Happy, with Wojciech Bogusławski's libretto based on a comedy by Franciszek Bohomolec.

In 1779-1833 performances took place in a new theatre building on Krasiński Square, later called the National Theatre). Known as the father of Polish National Theatre, Bogusławski was a renowned actor, singer, director, playwright and entrepreneur. Also, at the National Theatre, from 1785 a troupe of His Majesty's Dancers (headed by ballet masters François Gabriel Le Doux of Paris and Daniel Curz of Venice) became active. At this theatre, on 17 March 1830, Chopin premiered his Piano Concerto No. 1 in E minor, Op. 11. Closed after the November 1830 Uprising, in 1924 the National Theatre was revived under the Second Polish Republic.

Under the Polish People's Republic (1945–89), the quality of the Theatre's productions was at times adversely affected by government pressures.

== Notable people ==
- Barbara Sierakowska, (1748-1831), stage actor and opera singer, (1774 until 1784)

== See also ==
- Theatre of Poland
