= Rawicz coat of arms =

Polish coat of arms

Rawa (Rawicz)
- Battle cry: Rawa
- Alternative names: Rawicz, Panna na niedźwiedziu, Ursus, Ursowic, Miedźwiada, Miedźwioda, Niedźwiada, Niedźwieda, Niedźwioda, Rawic, Rawita
- Earliest mention: 1334
- Towns: Polish settlements: Margonin, Mordy, Ożarów, Przysucha, Tomaszów Mazowiecki; municipalities (gminas): Gmina Mniów, Gmina Sawin; district of Warsaw: Ursynów; similar: Gmina Adamów, Chełm, Goniądz, Kętrzyn, Kościerzyna, Łuków, Mońki, Przemyśl, Radzyń Podlaski, Rawicz, Węgrów
- Families: 462 Polish names altogether: Amszyński, Bagocki, Bakałarowicz, Bandrowski, Bar (ennoblement 1593), Baranowski (ennoblement 1552), Barański, Bąkowski, Bełdowski, Bełzowski, Białonowicz, Biedrzychowski, Biedrzycki, Bielski, Bienieski, Binkbink, Biodra, Biskupski, Bliskowski, Błeszyński, Bocheński, Bogdański, Boguski, Boguskowski, Borowski, Borszczowski, Boryczewski, Borysowski, Boryszewski, Borzewicki, Borzyszewski, Bożewicki, Brabantski, Brośniowski, Bukowski, Bułajewski, Celejewski, Celejowski, Celgowski, Celigowski, Cemechowski, Chobrzański, Chobrzyński, Chociewski, Chodyński, Chodzyński, Chrobrzański, Chrobrzeński, Chroślicki, Cibowicz, Ciecierski, Cielgowski, Cieszycki, Ciszycki, Czekierski, Czekierstki, Czernski, Czerski, Czuryłło, Czysta, Ćwikła, Ćwilichowski, Dalmat, Dąbrowski, Dembiński, Depolt, Depult, Deręgowski, Dergon, Dergoński, Derhun, Derkon, Derkoński, Dębiński, Dobraniecki, Dobroniewski, Dobrzeniecki, Domaniewski, Dorostajski, Drzewicki, Drzewiecki, Duchnowski, Dziczkowski, Dziekoński, Dziewulski, Dzieżkowski, Fagel, Fajgel, Faygiel, Filipecki, Filipicki, Fribes (ennoblement 1791), Frybes (ennoblement 1791), Gadecki, Gadzicki, Gajecki, Galimski, Galiński, Gano, Ganolipski, Gawiński, Gaworski, Gawroński (ennoblement 1596), Gądecki, Gądek, Giedowg, Gieszkowski, Głąbkowski, Gniewosz, Godzicki, Gołyński, Gowarczewski, Goworek, Gozdziejowski, Górski, Grabkowski, Grądzki, Grot, Grotowski, Gudkowski, Guszkiewicz, Gut, Gutkowski, Hałuziński, Hołuziński, Homicki, Hrudziewicz, Hrudzina-Zaborowski (ennoblement 1777), Hudo, Jackowski, Jakubowicz, Jarewski, Jarocki, Jaroszyn, Jarowski, Jasieński, Jasiewicz, Jasilkowski, Jasiński, Jastkowski, Jaszczurowski, Jawojsz, Jawosz, Jawrysz, Jerome, Jeziorkowski, Kalnicki, Kamieński, Kamiński, Karpowicz, Karwowski, Kasprowicz (ennoblement 1566), Kazimierski, Kazimirski, Kiemlicki, Kiemlicz, Kieniewicz, Klimczycki, Kliszowski, Kłoczewski, Kłoczowski, Kłopocki, Kochan, Komorowski, Koniński, Korniłłowicz, Korniłowicz, Kosacki, Kosecki, Kosibski, Kosiecki, Kosiński, Kossacki, Kossecki, Kostro, Kostryc, Koziełkowski, Koziołkowski, Krajoszewski, Krasnowski, Krasowski, Krassowski, Kraszczyński, Kraśnicki, Kruczyński, Krukowski, Krzewski, Krzowski, Krzyczykowski, Krzyszczykowski, Kubeł, Kujawski, Kurosz, Lang, Lasota, Lasotawicz, Lassotovitch, Lassota, Leniek, Linowski, Lipicki, Lipiński, Łakocki, Łąkocki, Łętowski, Łubkowski, Łubnicki, Łupnicki, Mager, Magier, Makocki, Małgiewski, Mąkocki, Mejnart, Mejsztowicz, Meleniewski, Melgiewski, Melin, Meysztowicz, Męcina, Męciński, Męczyna, Męczyński, Michowski, Miechowski, Miedzikowski, Miedzikowski, Miedzykowski, Mikulczewski, Mikulski, Mikułowski, Minigał, Mitrowski, Mnichowski, Modłkowski, Mońko, Mosiński, Moszyński, Mysłowski, Mystkowski, Nadarski, Nakutowicz, Nasuta, Nasuta, Naszuta, Niedziałkowski, Niemcewicz, Niesielkowski, Niesułkowski, Nieszczewski, Nieśmiejan, Niszczewski, Noskowski, Nosowski, Nossowski, Nowomiejski, Nowomiescki, Nowomski, Nowowski, Nożewski, Nożowski, Nurzyński, Obelt, Okolski, Okólski z Okoła, Olendski, Olendzki, Oleński, Olęcki, Olędzki, Olęski, Olpiński, Olszewski, Olszowski, Ołdak, Ołdakowski, Oski, Osska, Ostasz, Ostrowski, Oszka, Otrembus, Owsianko, Owsiany, Ożarowski, Ożga, Pachniewski, Pankracki, Paroski, Patawin, Pawełecki, Pękoszewski, Piasecki, Plaskota, Płaskot, Płaskota, Płodziński (ennoblement 1592), Podczaski, Podczaszyński, Poddębski, Poderski, Podkoński, Poraziński, Prandota, Prosiński, Prusieński, Prusiński, Pruszyński, Przyjemski, Przystałowicz, Pukiel, Pukinicki, Pukl, Rabcewicz, Raciborski, Racibórzyński, Radkowski, Radliński, Radomyski, Radziejowski, Radzymiński, Rafał, Rajkowski, Rakacewicz, Rakocy, Rapcewicz, Rawa, Rawicz, Raykowski, Rąblewski, Regulski, Reszczeński, Reszczyński, Rewecki, Rewucki, Reykowski, Rogoliński, Rojek, Rokicki, Rokotnicki, Rososki, Rudzieński, Rudziński, Rusiecki, Ruzdziński, Rybka, Ryczkowski, Rzepiński, Saczyński, Samborzecki, Sączyński, Sib, Siedlecki, Siestrzyński, Skawiński, Skinder, Skowieski, Skubicz, Skubisz, Skubysz, Słupecki, Smiarowski, Smorczewski, Snopek, Snopkowski, Sołomerecki, Sołomereski, Sowiński (ennoblement 1592), Staczek, Staczko, Stanowski, Stecki, Stocki, Stolnicki, Straszewski, Sulistrowski, Suliszewski, Sum, Swiniowski, Szabliński, Szabrański, Szachłacki, Szaciński, Szczerba, Szczerbanienko, Szczerbań, Szczerbowicz, Szczyciński, Szotarski, Szuliszewski, Szumowicz, Szydłowski, Śmiarowski, Świątnicki, Świerzbiński, Świniowski, Tadajewski, Tadajowski, Tąkiel, Tązowski, Tczyński, Trzciński, Twaróg, Ulasewicz, Ursyn-Kornułowicz, Ursyn-Niemcewicz, Ursyn-Rusiecki, Urzelowski, Użarowski, Wagner (ennoblement 1662), Warsz, Warszawski, Warszewski, Węgrzynowicz, Wierciński, Wisimirski, Witanowski, Wojaczyński, Wojatyński, Wojcicki, Wolski (ennoblement 1591), Wołmiński, Wołucki, Woźnicki, Woźnieński, Wożnieński, Wójcicki, Wóycicki, Wóyciński, Wręcki, Wroczeński, Wrzelowski, Wszeborski, Wyszomierski, Wyszomirski, Zaborowski (Saborowski, Zaborowskij, Zabriskie), Zackowski, Zacnolaski, Zaczek, Zaczkowski, Zaćwilichowski, Zaichowski, Zakaszewski, Załuska, Załuski, Zawada (ennoblement 1571) (Zowada, Sowada), Zawadowski, Zdembiński, Zdębiński, Zdrzalik, Zdziechowski, Zegrzda, Zegzdra, Zelasowski, Ziemacki, Ziemak, Zołędowski, Żelaskowski, Żelazkowski, Żelazny, Żelazo, Żelazowski, Żelichliński, Żołędowski, Żołękowski, Żwan

Rawa (Rawicz) is a coat of arms of Polish origin. It was borne by several noble families of Polish–Lithuanian Commonwealth, Russian Empire and Ukraine.

The ancestry of first bearers of Rawicz (the Rawici clan) is debated. Version supported by Polish chronicler Jan Długosz points out branch of Czech (Bohemian) Vršovci clan, version supported by Polish heraldist Kasper Niesiecki (as better) says that their origin is pagan Polish.

Lot of families were later legally adopted into the clan or ennobled with this coat of arms, some misattributed to the clan by similarity of arms, names or by simple error or usurpation.

Nowadays it (or its modification) is used as coat of arms of several Polish settlements.

== Blazon ==
Main version (in others colours may differ):

Shield Or (gold) with a bear (probably Ursus arctos) Sable (black) facing dexter (right) with a maiden on its back. The maiden, vested in royal attire Gules (red) and a crown Or, with flowing hair and hands upraised a little and expanded, all proper. Out of the crest coronet, between two antlers proper, a bear facing dexter. His left arm in front is lowered, and another one holds a rose on a stem, all proper, which the bear carries to his snout.

== History ==
=== Power struggles in Bohemia: damnation, prosecution and salvation ===
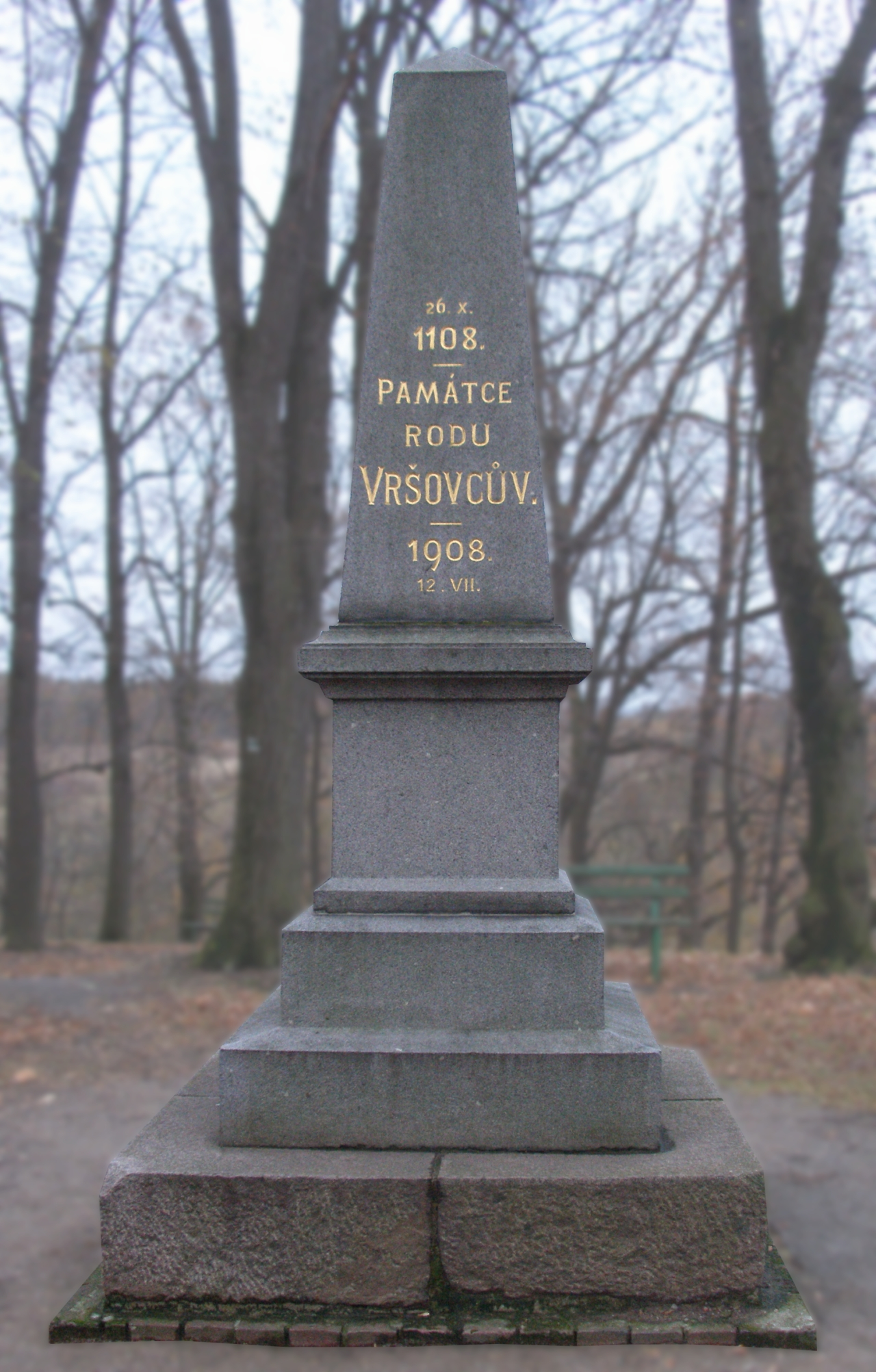
Memorial of Vršovci in Vraclav, Czech Republic

The Vršovci (whose branch was probably the root of some Rawicz bearers) took part in cruel power struggles that occurred in Bohemia on the turn of the first millennium. Together with Přemyslids led by Boleslaus II the Pious they rivalised with Slavniki clan. During the struggles five members of rival Slavniki clan: Soběbor, Spytimír, Pobraslav, Pořej, and Čáslav were murdered. They were brothers of Czech missionary and bishop st. Adalbert of Prague (Czech: Svatý Vojtěch, Polish: święty Wojciech). In 995 he damned the murderers(Vršovci).

In historical records Czech duke Svatopluk of Přemyslids clan is accused of ordering to kill Mutyna and two his sons: Bożej and Boraszek also Unisław and Domisław (all of them belonged to the Vršovci family) during similar power struggles thirteen years later.

Being horrified by those events some of Vršovci fled to Poland, where they were received with honours by king Bolesław III Krzywousty who gave them lands in the duchy of Masovia, that were foundation of future Rawa Voivodeship.

=== Origin of Polish Rawici ===
Rawicz is an old coat of arms, one of the oldest used in Poland. According to the legend it was imported from Lorraine (where it is first mentioned in 1003) prior to 1109. According to a legend, the symbol was brought to Lorraine from England, where it was awarded to the descendants of Canute the Great.

The ancestry of first bearers of Rawicz (the Rawici clan) is debated:

- version supported by Polish chronicler Jan Długosz points out one of branches of Czech (Bohemian) Vršovci clan, Early history of Vršovci is described by Cosmas of Prague in "Chronicle of Bohemians".
- version supported by Polish heraldist Kasper Niesiecki (as better) says that their origin is pagan Polish.

=== Participation in the Battle of Grunwald ===
In 1410 Rawicz bearers took part in the Battle of Grunwald. Among 50 Polish gonfalons (regiments) one (the 26th) took the field under Rawa coat of arms and was led by Christian of Ostrów, Kraków castellan. He was also a war councilor, one of the seven chief members of General Headquarters of Władysław II Jagiełło. In addition, one of the Rawicz bearers is marked for his military valour in the Battle of Koronowo that occurred shortly after the Grunwald. This knight's name was Christian of Goworzici, Rawa coat of arms.

(Jan Długosz, Annales seu cronici incliti regni Poloniae)

== Legend ==
According to the legend, an English king died without leaving a properly perfected testament, so his last will was expressed from the world beyond. He left a crown and all immovable property to his son, and all movables – to his daughter. Being instigated by his councilors, the Prince decided to fulfill his father's will nominally. He ordered to drive a black bear (which undoubtedly was a unit of king's movable property) to a Princess' bedchamber. In case of Princess' death that seemed inevitable, the King's wish would be fulfilled and Princess' failure to manage the movables would be proven. However, the Princess did not only tame the beast but even rode out her chamber on its back, upraising her hands and calling for justice. Her brother made sure that truth and heaven take sister's side. He asked her pardon and married her off to a Duke of Lorraine, with all due property as a portion. As a keepsake Princess gave her descendants a coat of arms with a girl riding a bear depicted on it. This coat of arms was called "Rawicz". It symbolizes ability to overcome difficulties with honour, to change confusion into victory.

This legend is stated in a well-known Polish armorial "Orbis Polonus" assembled by Szymon Okolski in 1641–1643.

== Notable bearers ==
Notable bearers of this coat of arms include:

- Andrzej Gawroński – Polish bishop
- Jan Grot – Polish bishop
- Aleksander Jakub Jasiewicz – grandfather of Lech Kaczyński (President of Poland) and Jarosław Kaczyński (former premier of Poland), father of pl:Jadwiga Kaczyńska
- Krzysztof Kosiński (Ukrainian: Криштоф Косинський) – Hetman of Ukrainian Cossacks
- Stefan Kossecki-Polish army Officer
- Szymon Okolski
- Antoni Jan Ostrowski – one of commanders of Polish November Uprising
- Kazimierz Ołdakowski – prewar director of Fabryka Broni
- Tomasz Adam Ostrowski
- Władysław Ostrowski – Marshal of the Sejm during November Uprising
- Adam Petrovich Ozharovsky (Russian: Адам Петрович Ожаровский) – a Russian general of Polish descent
- Piotr Ożarowski
- Stanisław Przyjemski – Grand Marshal of the Crown (Polish: Marszałek wielki koronny)
- Julian Ursyn-Niemcewicz
- Jerzy Zdziechowski
- Kazimierz Zdziechowski
- Marian Zdziechowski
- (in Polish) for others see notable people of Rawicz coat of arms on Polish Wikipedia
- (in Russian) articles about notable Russian noble families of cognate coat of arms on Russian Wikipedia
- Dylan Biedrzycki – Master of Mishkeegogamang First Nation and Future Chief (Half Breed)
- Edward Olendzki - Virtuti Militari (List of Cavaliers)

== See also ==
- Polish heraldry
- Heraldry
- Rawicz (note the bear in the city's coat-of-arms)

== Sources ==
- (in Polish) Bartosz Paprocki. Herby rycerstwa polskiego. II ed. Krakow, 1858. pp. 539–550.
- (in Polish) "Herbarz polski Kaspra Niesieckiego S.J." vol. VIII 97–100, Kasper Niesiecki, Jan Nepomucen Bobrowicz, Leipzig 1841
- (in Russian), partly (in Polish) Obshchiy Gyerbovnik dvoryanskih rodov Vsyerossiyskoy Impyerii (Общий Гербовник дворянских родов Всероссийской Империи) 1797–1917
- (in English) Zabriskie, George Olin (1963). The Zabriskie Family. Salt Lake City, Utah: Publisher's Press. p. 24. LCCN CS71.Z12 1963.
