= Justynian Szczytt (d. 1677) =

Polish nobleman

- Coat of arms: Jastrzębiec
- Died: 1677
- Buried: Franciscan's Cloister, Prozoroki
- Noble family: Szczytt family
- wife: Anna (Joanna) Tukowicz
- Issue: Konstanty Marcjan, Bronisław, Krzysztof Benedykt, Samuel Karol, Albrycht (Olbracht), Kazimierz
- Father: Krzysztof Szczytt
- Mother: Zofia Lissowska
- Occupation: Polotsk's podkomorzy

Justynian Niemirowicz Szczytt (also spelled Szczyt and Szczyth; died 1677) was a Polish nobleman (szlachcic), a chamberlain (podkomorzy) of Polotsk and a deputy to the sejm (parliament) of the Polish–Lithuanian Commonwealth.

For many years he was a servant of the magnate Sapieha family. He was vice wojewoda (vice governor) of Polotsk (probably 1666–70) and chamberlain (podkomorzy) of Polotsk from 1673. Szczytt was a sejm deputy in 1667, 1668, 1669, 1670 and 1674.

He was also a founder of the Franciscan cloister at Prozaroki (Polish Prozoroki).

== Family ==
Justynian Szczytt was a member of the Szczytt family, which used Jastrzębiec as its coat of arms (although according to Kasper Niesiecki, it was not Jastrzębiec, but Radwan).

Justynian's great-grandfather was Mikołaj Szczytt, wojski of Witebsk, who spent 15 years in captivity in Moscow. Justynian was the son of Krzysztof Szczytt, owner of Białe in Polotsk Voivodeship, and his wife Zofia Lissowski. After the death of Krzysztof Szczytt, Zofia married Józef Skinder. Justynian Szczytt had five siblings: three brothers—Jan (d. between 15 October 1668 and 23 April 1672), Mikołaj (wojski of Mścisław, d. 1676), and Aleksander—and two sisters—Anna and Halszka.

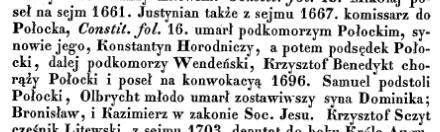
Information of Justynian Szczytt's sons in Herbarz polski by Kasper Niesiecki

Justynian Szczytt married Anna Joanna Tukowicz (d. 1694), daughter of Bazyli Tukowicz, in 1648. They had six sons:

- Konstanty Marcjan, b. about 1649, d. 17 or 22 October 1712; podsędek (deputy district judge) of Polotsk, elector of Michał Korybut Wiśniowiecki, Jan III Sobieski and August II
- Bronisław, d. between 2 June 1668 and 1675
- Krzysztof Benedykt, d. 1720; castellan of Smolensk
- Samuel Karol, d. 24 December 1709
- Albrecht (Olbracht, Olbrycht), d. 22 August 1694; podstoli of Smolensk
- Kazimierz, b. 29 November 1664, d. 8 September 1708; Jesuit.

== Life ==
Nothing is known about the date or place of Justynian Szczytt's birth, nor his education and youth.

He was a servant of the magnat Sapieha family for many years, particularly of Paweł Jan Sapieha and his son Benedykt Paweł Sapieha. He administered property in Czereje in their names from 1667 to 1669. By 22 June 1666, he had become Polotsk's vice-voivode (podwojewodzi, literally: under-voivode). In 1667, Szczytt was elected for the first time as a member of the sejm walny (parliament) of the Polish–Lithuanian Commonwealth as a representative of the Połock Voivodeship. The following year he served as a member of parliament twice: first in the extraordinary parliament (sejm ekstraordynaryjny) and again in the abdication sejm after King Jan Kazimierz abdicated the throne.

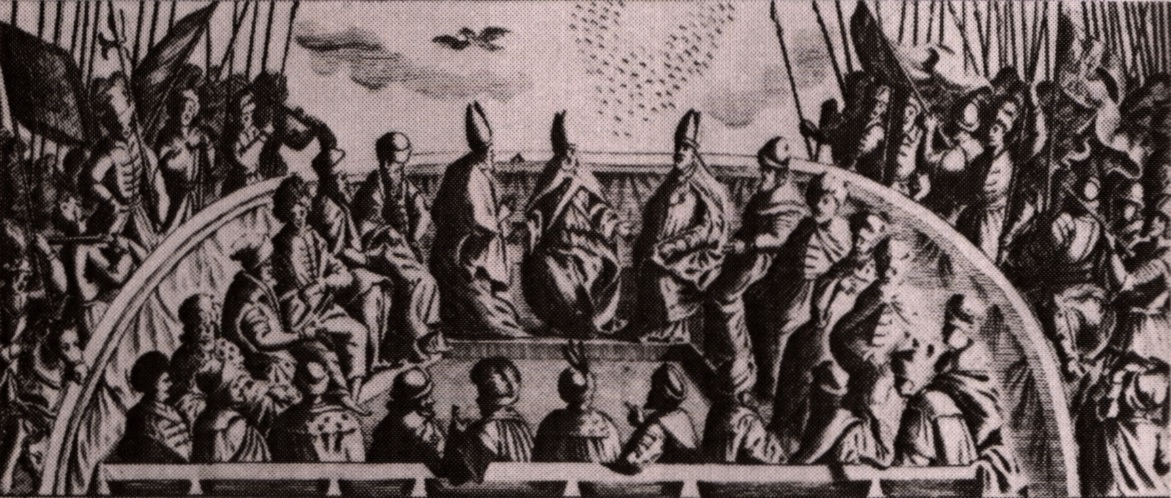
Election of Michał Korybut Wiśniowiecki

Szczytt was member of parliament during the election sejm of 1669, which elevated Michał Korybut Wiśniowiecki to the Polish throne. According to family tradition, Szczytt saw that people were giving new king an ordinary-looking szabla. He gave the king his own very ornamental sabre. Eventually the szabla was returned to Szczytt, and it remained a family heirloom until the 1880s.

Also in 1669, Szczytt was a member of the coronation sejm. He tried to stop the proceedings of parliament for an unknown reason on 25 October 1669, but the following day he retracted his objection on the condition that the Połock Voivodeship be exempt from taxes for a period of six years.

By 29 July 1670, Kazimierz Jan Sapieha, Połock's new voivode, named Szczytt the new podwojewodzi. Historians believe Sapieha did so in exchange for Szczytt's property in Lisna. Also in 1670, Szczytt was a judge of the Lithuanian Tribunal. In June 1670, on behalf of the Sapieha family, he accused Mikołaj Ciechanowiecki, Marshall of the Tribunal, of several crimes, including being elected illegally. Then Szczytt left Wilno and paralysed the Tribunal for some time. Eventually, the Tribunal won the support the magnate Pac family and Szczytt was banished.

That same year, Szczytt was a member of parliament. Between 6 June and 10 August 1673 he became Polotsk's podkomorzy (chamberlain). As podkomorzy he was known from his judiciousness. He became known as sprawiedliwy Szczyt ("Justice Szczytt").

During election Sejm of 1674 he voted for Jan III Sobieski. In 1677 Szczytt brought the Franciscan Brothers to Prozaroki, where he built them a cloister and church.

Justynian Szczytt died in 1677 (although Teodor Żychliński states that Szczytt died about 1681). He was buried in the Franciscan church in Prozaroki.

== Estate ==
Szczytt was an owner of the several villages. From his father he inherited Białe. Later he bought some more: Truchonowicz, Kozłów and Słobódki from Jerzy Atełchowski, Hubin and island on Otułow's river from Jakub Iwanowicz Suprynowicz Bużycki and his wife Halsza in 1654.

Szczytt was also owner of parts of some villages. He bought part of Tabołki and Prozaroki from his brother-in-law Stefan Tukowicz (first in 1663, second in 1666) and part of Sanniki from Michał Skarżyński in 1674. He was also mentioned as owner of Komorowszczyzna, Ołoskowo and Pohorełe.

Justynian Szczytt had as lien the following villages: Doroszkowice (Dorozińce), Babcze, Czerniewicz, Woroszki, Mamonowszczyzna, Szypiłłowszczyzma, Świerzno and Dziernowice.

Szczytt divided his property among his sons in 1675.
