= Justynian Szczytt =

Justynian Szczytt may refer to:

- Justynian Szczytt (d. 1677), member of parliament of Polish–Lithuanian Commonwealth
- Justynian Szczytt (1740–1824), member of the parliament of the Polish–Lithuanian Commonwealth
