= Piotr Ożarowski =

Polish noble, politic and military commander (1725–1794)

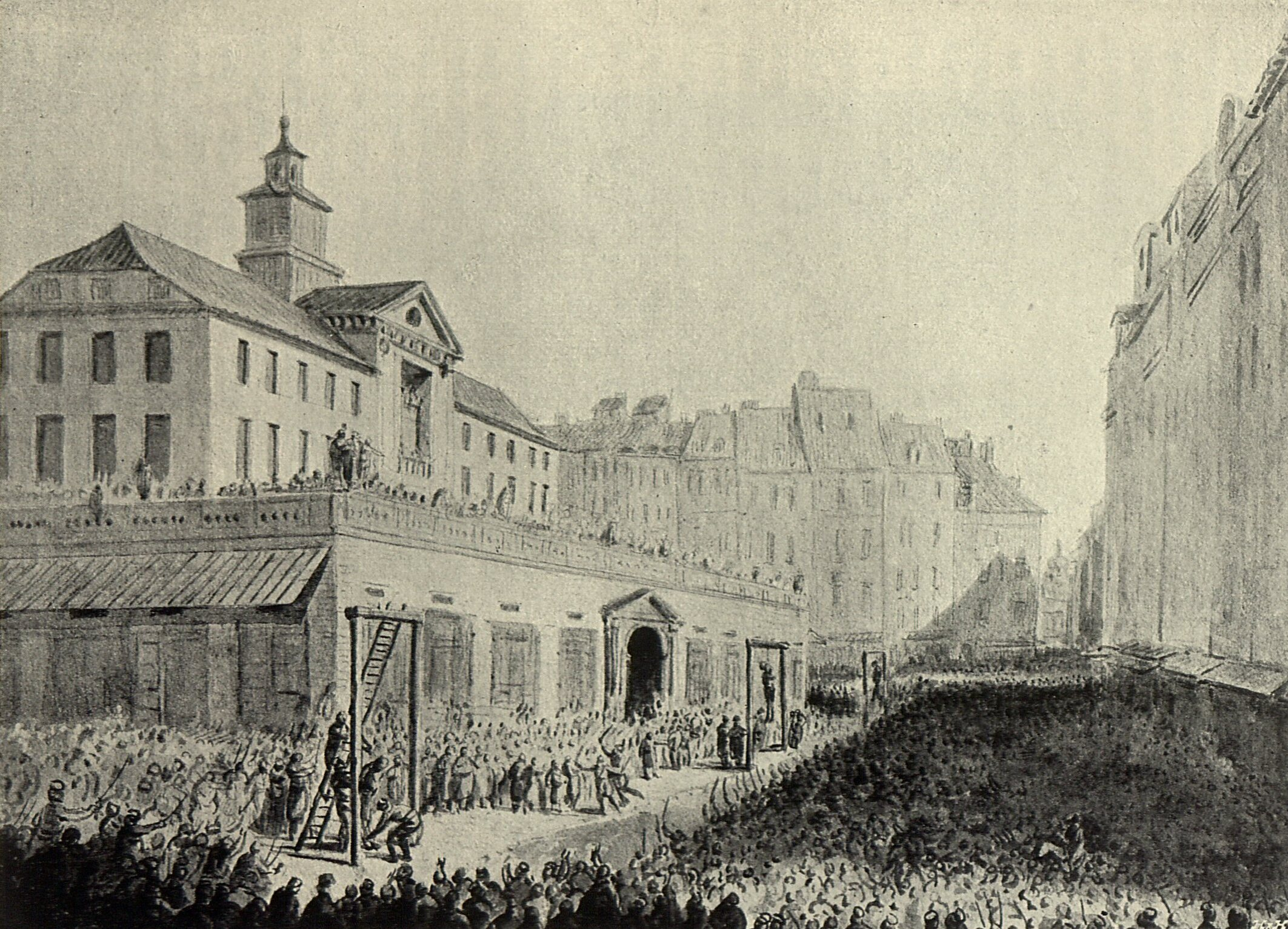
Hanging of traitors by Jan Piotr Norblin

Piotr Ożarowski (Polish pronunciation: [ˈpjɔtr ɔʐaˈrɔfskʲi]; 1725 – 9 May 1794 in Warsaw) was a Polish noble (szlachcic), politic and military commander. Member of the infamous Confederation of Targowica, he reached the offices of Great Crown Hetman and castellan of Wojnice.

Coat of arms of Ożarowski family - Rawicz (Vrsin)

Early supporter of king Stanisław August Poniatowski, he disapproved of his more liberal policies and threw his lot with the pro-Russian conservative faction. From 1789 he was recruited by Russian ambassador to Poland, Otto Magnus von Stackelberg. From Stackelberg he received a yearly pension from Russia (2000 ducats). He joined the Confederation of Targowica which was opposed to the reforms of the Great Sejm (particularly the Constitution of the 3 May). In 1792 he became the commander of the Warsaw's garrison as well as of the Lesser Poland division. At the Grodno Sejm he supported the Second Partition of Poland and in 1793 he was nominated to the rank of Great Crown Hetman and commander of Warsaw. He acted as the messenger between Stanisław Szczęsny Potocki and king Poniatowski.

In the aftermath of the 1794 Warsaw Uprising, part of Kościuszko Uprising which was aimed against the Russian domination over Poland, he was captured by the insurrectionists, accused of treason, and sentenced to hanging by the revolutionary court; the sentence was carried out on 9 May on Warsaw Square, amidst the cheering crowds encouraged by the Polish Jacobins. Together with him, several other supporters of Targowica and Russian Empire were executed: Józef Ankwicz, bishop Józef Kossakowski and hetman Józef Zabiełło.

His son Adam Ożarowski made a career in the Russian military service.
