= Karol Boscamp-Lasopolski =

Dutch diplomat (died 1794)

Karol Boscamp-Lasopolski (also Boskamp, de Boscamp, de Boskamp; died 28 June 1794) was a Dutch diplomat in service of Poland and Russia. He was a Chamberlain in the court of Polish king Stanisław August Poniatowski. He was lynched by a mob during the Warsaw Uprising of 1794.

== Biography ==
Little is known about his youth. He was born in the Netherlands; some other sources note his French origin. He served as a courier for the Prussian envoy in Istanbul during the Seven Years' War. In 1761 he served as an adviser to Crimean Khan, Qırım Giray.

After he became estranged from the Khan, he left for Poland. From 1764 he served in the Polish diplomatic service, first under Familia, and soon under king Stanisław August Poniatowski. He used his expertise on the Ottoman politics to aid Polish relations, worked with the envoy Tomasz Aleksandrowicz and was one of the founders of the School of Oriental Languages in Istanbul, which served as an unofficial Polish embassy there.

From 1766 he was responsible for the Poniatowski's correspondence with the East. He was elevated to the rank of nobility (through Indygenat) by the Repnin Sejm. He acted as Poniatowski spy in on the Bar Confederation. In 1774 he took part in diplomatic mission to St. Petersburg (together with Franciszek Ksawery Branicki). From 1775 he was officially employed in the Department of Foreign Interests of the Permanent Council. In 1776 he received the noble name Lasopolski, the Order of Saint Stanislaus and the court rank of Chamberlain. He served as the Polish ambassador in the Ottoman Empire.

After the Sejm of 1778 decreed that foreigners cannot serve in the Polish diplomatic service, he became a merchant, and formed some partnerships with Polish Jews. In the 1780s he wrote a project known as Vox in deserto, which he presented to king Poniatowski at a time he was considering joining Russia in its war against Ottomans, and which drew plans for a conquest of Moldava and surrounding territories.

He also developed contacts with the Russian diplomatic service, for which he began to work during the Great Sejm. In 1791 he agitated against an alliance between Poland and the Ottoman Empire. Under a name Agathomachos-Wyjaśnicki he published a brochure La Turcofédéromanie avec son spécifique à côté gratis... suives du traité d`alliance entre la Pologne et la Turquie, which caused a minor scandal, as it revealed the plans for the said alliance. During the Polish–Russian War of 1792 he left Warsaw, as he became unpopular with many of the patriotic and anti-Russian activists. He served under Russian diplomats Jacob Sievers and Yakov Bulgakov and was active in the background of the Grodno Sejm of 1793.

During the Warsaw Uprising of 1794 in the Kościuszko Uprising he found brief refuge in the Saxon embassy, but was arrested on 17 April on the orders of the Polish provisional government. During the unrest of 28 June 1794 he was dragged from the jail and lynched (most sources specify he was publicly hanged), alongside some other unpopular individuals seen as supporters of the Targowica Confederation and traitors to the Polish cause. The hanged individuals, in addition to Boscamp-Lasopolski, included bishop Ignacy Jakub Massalski and prince Antoni Stanisław Czetwertyński-Światopełk.
