= Grodno Castle =

Grodno Castle may refer to:

== Belarus ==
- Old Grodno Castle
- New Grodno Castle

== Poland ==
- Grodno Castle (Poland)
