= Ankwicz =

Ankwicz is a Polish-language surname of nobility belonging to the coat of arms Counts Ankwicz. Historical feminine forms: Ankwiczówna (unmarried, from father's surname), Ankwiczowa (married; from husband's surname).

- Andrzej Alojzy Ankwicz (1777–1838), archbishop
- Józef Ankwicz (1750–1794), castellan, Sejm deputy
- Krystyna Ankwicz (1907–1985), Polish film actress
- Henrietta Ewa Ankwiczówna (1810–1879), Polish countess
