= Józef Zabiełło =

Polish noble

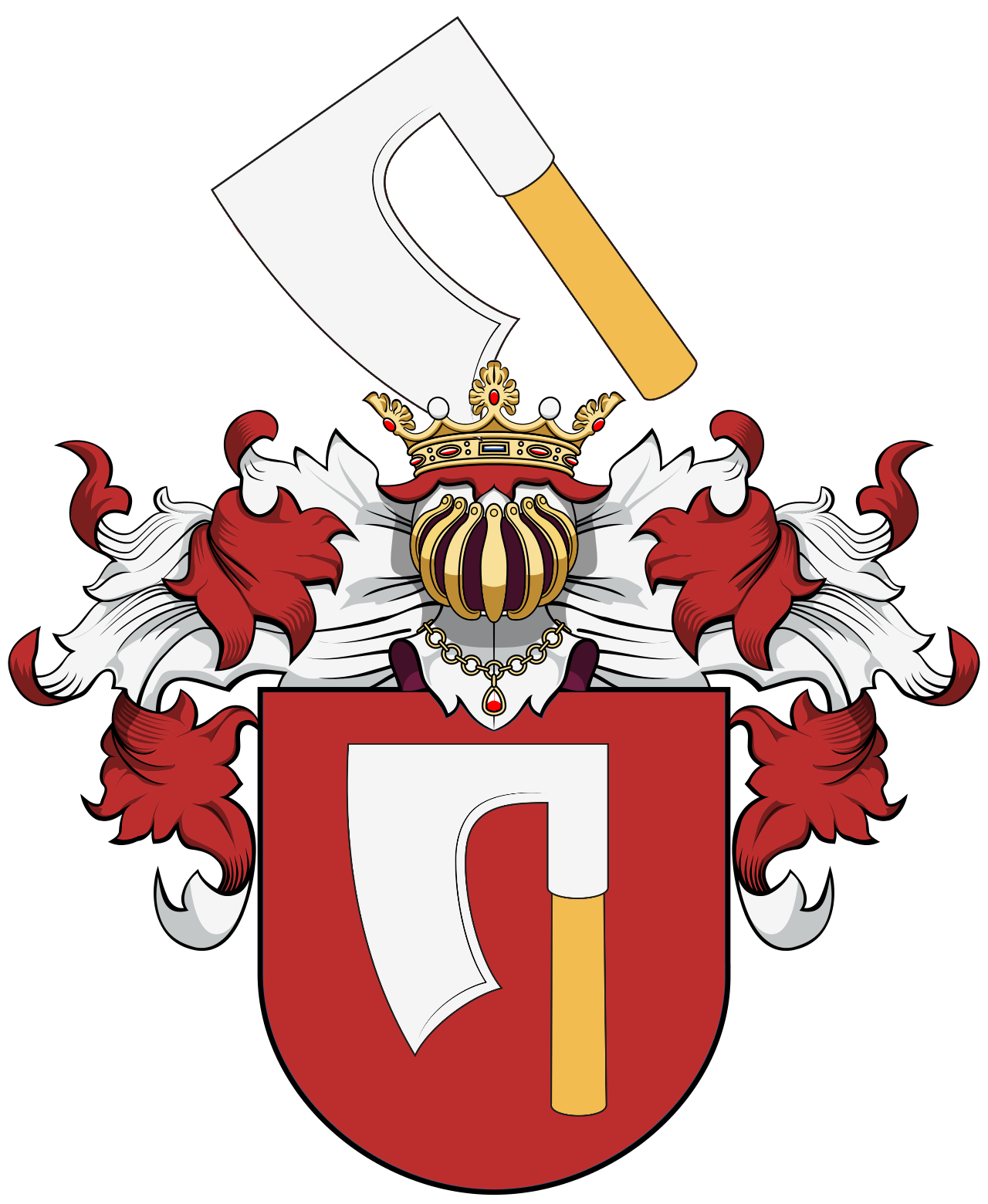
Topór coat of arms

Józef Zabiełło h. Topór (Polish pronunciation: [ˈjuzɛv zaˈbjɛwwɔ]; c. 1750 – 9 May 1794 in Warsaw, Poland) was a Polish–Lithuanian nobleman (szlachcic). Lithuanian Grand Master of the Hunt from 1775, konsyliarz of Permanent Council from 1782, deputy of Samogitia to the Great Sejm and Field Hetman of Lithuania from 1793, he was a supporter of the Russian Empire in the last years of the Commonwealth.

== Early life ==
Son of Antoni Zabiełło and Zofia Niemirowicz-Szczytt h. Jastrzębiec.

== Polish–Lithuanian Commonwealth ==
=== Four-Year Sejm ===
Opponent of the Constitution of 3 May and deputy marshal of the Targowica Confederation. After the Polish–Russian War of 1792, because of his support for the Russian, he was selected by them to be a Field Hetman of Lithuania and deputy to the Grodno Sejm, the last Sejm of the Commonwealth, infamous for being forced by Russians to sign the act of the second partition. During the Kościuszko Uprising he was apprehended by the revolutionaries in the aftermath of the Warsaw Uprising. After it was revealed that he had been receiving a steady pension from the Russian embassy for several years, he was sentenced to hanging as a traitor and executed on 9 May 1794.
