= Ludwik Szymon Gutakowski =

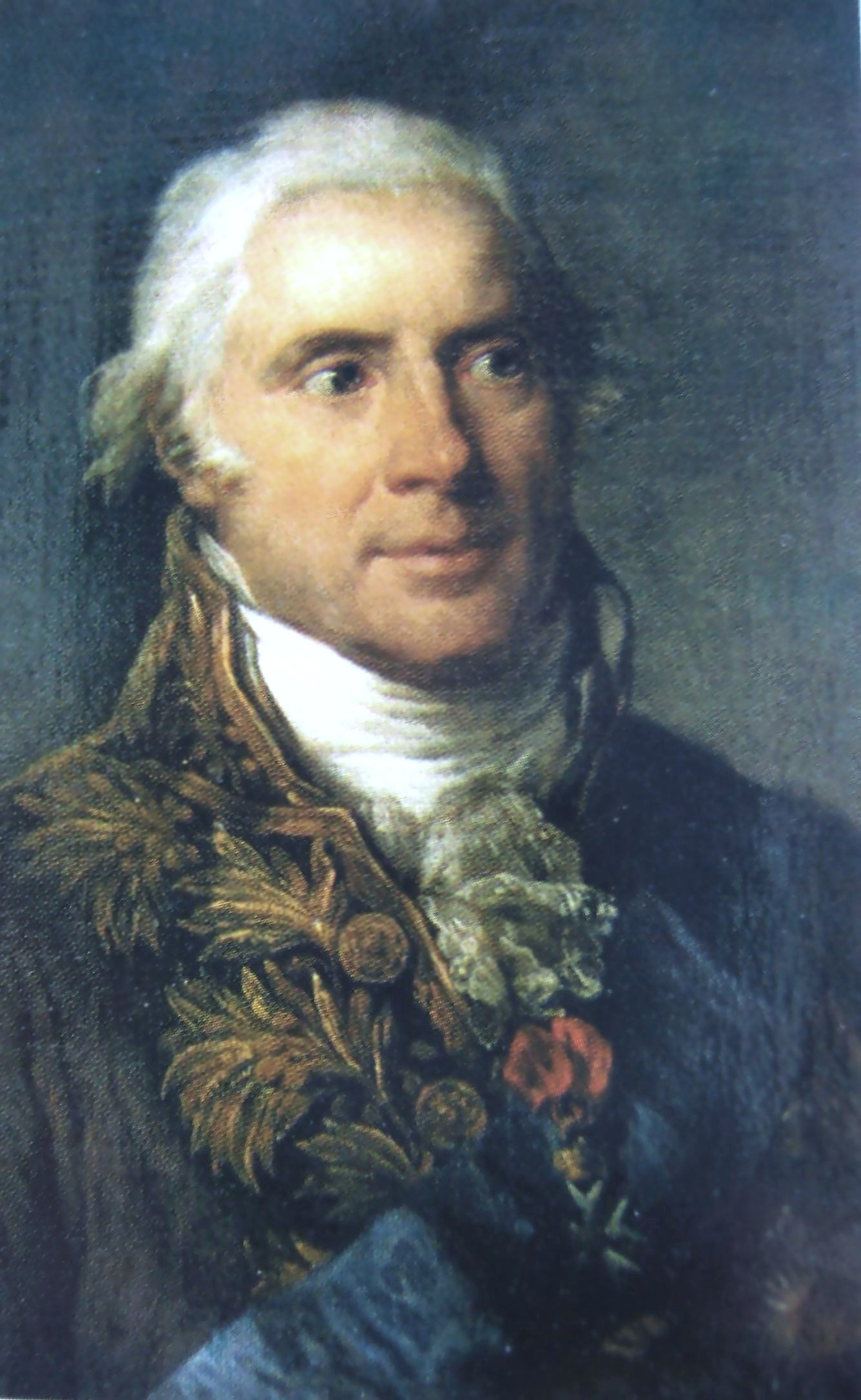

2nd Prime Minister of Duchy of Warsaw
- In office 14 December 1807 – 23 March 1809
- Monarch: Frederick Augustus I
- Preceded by: Stanisław Małachowski
- Succeeded by: Stanisław Kostka Potocki

Personal details
- Born: 28 October 1738 Kierogaliszki
- Died: 1 December 1811 (aged 73) Warsaw, Duchy of Warsaw

Ludwik Szymon Gutakowski of the Gutak coat of arms (28 October 1738 - 1 December 1811 in Warsaw) was the second Prime Minister of Poland, and the President of the Council of State and of the Cabinet.

He was educated at the Collegium Nobilium in Warsaw, an elite boarding school. He was a chamberlain to both Augustus III and to Stanisław August Poniatowski because his family had supported the latterking's election, but this was only an honorary position. In the 1770s, he participated in diplomatic excursion to Saint Petersburg and to London. In 1778, he became a member of the Permanent Council and in the following year briefly stood in for Ignacy Potocki as the Marshal when he was unavailable. He was an envoy at the Four-Year Sejm, at which he supported the Constitution of 3 May. Later, however, he participated in the Russian-led Confederation of Targowica, which was opposed to the Constitution. As part of the anti-Russian Kościuszko Uprising, he was a member of the Supreme National Council. In November 1806, he was chosen to greet Joachim Murat upon his arrival in Warsaw.

With Teresa Sobolewska, he had one son, Wacław Gutakowski, born 7 March 1790, an adjutant of Aleksandr I, and through his marriage to Józefa Grudzińska, sister of Joanna Grudzińska, the brother-in-law of his brother the Grand Duke Constantine Pavlovich.

In 1780, he was given the Order of St. Stanislaus.
