= Hubin =

- Hubin (Lepelsk County) – village in 19th century in Lepelsk County, today in Belarus
- Hubin (Buczacz County) – village in 19th century in Buczacz County, today in Ukraine

== Chinese places ==
- Hubin District (湖滨区), – a district of Sanmenxia, Henan
- Hubin, Yueyang (湖滨街道), – a subdistrict of Yueyanglou District, Yueyang, Hunan
