= Antoni Ostrowski =

Antoni Ostrowski may refer to:

- Antoni Jan Ostrowski (1782-1845) landowner, political and economic activist, general and publicist
- Antoni Kazimierz Ostrowski (1713-1784) bishop, primate of Poland
