= Justynian Szczytt (1740–1824) =

Justynian Szczytt (6 February 1740 – 7 March 1824) was a member of the Permanent Council, member of the parliament (sejm walny) of the Polish–Lithuanian Commonwealth.

He was member of Szczytt family, which used Jastrzębiec as coat of arms (according to Kasper Niesiecki it was not Jastrzębiec, but Radwan). Justynian was an only son of Jan Szczytt (1705-1767) and his second wife Barbara née Chomińska (d. 1775), daughter of Ludwik Jakub Chomiński, a writer of Lithuania (pisarz wielki literwski, notarius magnus Lithuaniae).

Justynian was educated at Collegium Nobilium in Wilno.

Justynian Szczytt died on 7 March 1824. He was buried in the underground in Dominicans' Church in Wołyńce.

== Wives and children ==
He was married twice. His first wife was Kazimiera Barbara Łopaciński (b. 14 March 1746, d. 3 February 1773). In 1775 he married Kazimiera Woyna (d. 1783), daughter of Józef Woyna, widow of Trojan Korsak, Połock's vice-voivode (podwojewodzi, literally: under-voivode).

Children from the first marriage were:

- Barbara Petronella Magdalena, b. 30 June 1763, d. 17 February 1824, wife of Józef Kazimierz Maciej Dusiatski Rudomina,
- Feliks, b. 20 November 1764, d. 1793,
- Anna,
- Józefa,
- Tekla Kunegunda Teresa, b. 5 November 1770, d. as child.

Children from the second marriage were:

- Józef, b. 15 Mai 1777,
- Tadeusz, b. 1778, d. 1840, Połock's marshal (marszałek)
- Jan, d. 14 April 1851,
- Dorota, d. 10 June 1813, wife of Mikołaj Karnicki, Lucynia's marshal (marszałek).
