= Tomasz Adam Ostrowski =

Polish nobleman (szlachcic) and politician

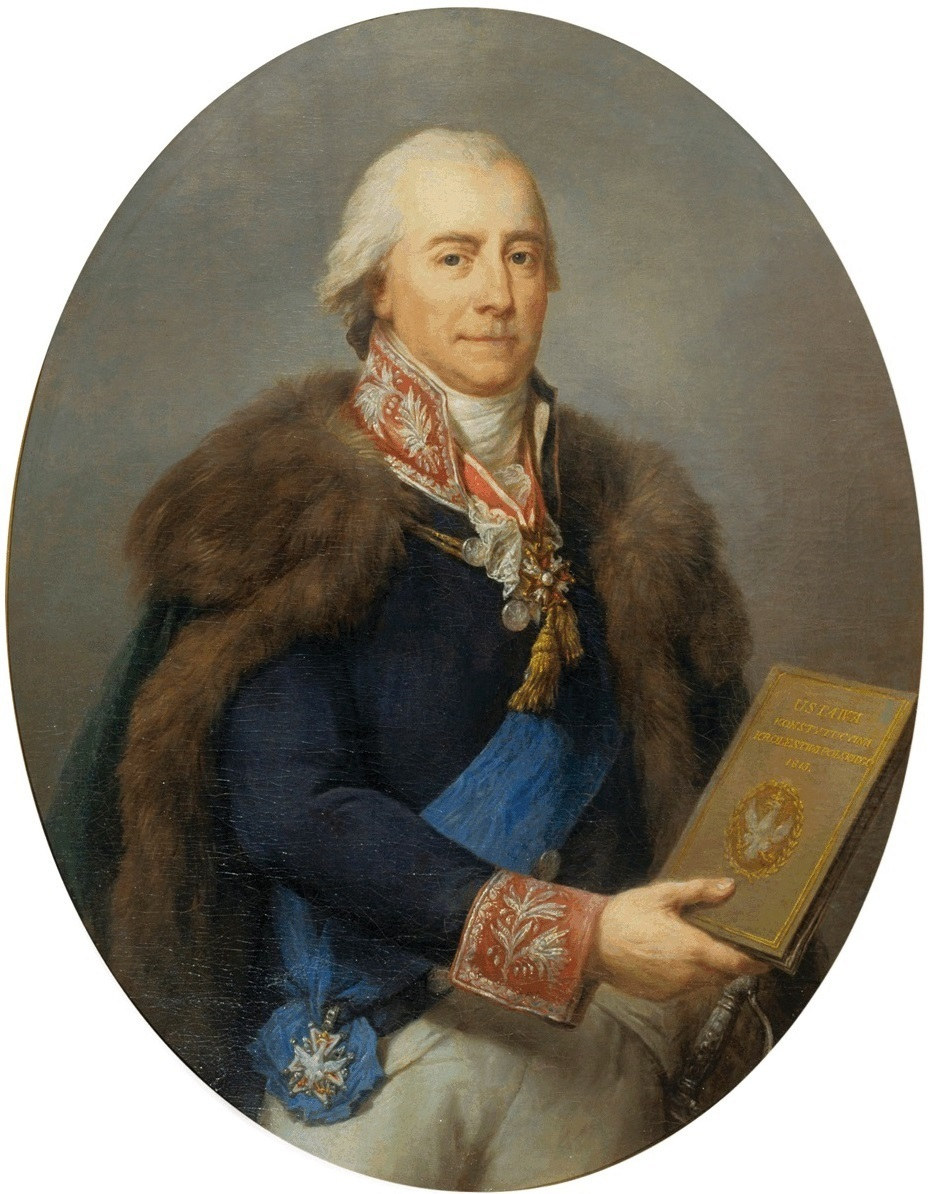
- Born: 21 December 1735
- Died: 5 February 1817 (aged 81); Warsaw, Congress Poland
- Noble family: Ostrowski
- Spouses: Józefa Godlewska; Apolonia Ledóchowska; Apolonia Brzozowska
- Father: Piotr Ostrowski
- Mother: Konstancja Stoińska

Count Tomasz Adam Ostrowski (21 December 1735 – 5 February 1817) was a Polish nobleman (szlachcic), politician, spokesman, statesman and Count since 1798.

Tomasz became Colonel of the Crown Army in 1765, Chamberlain of King Stanisław II Augustus in 1767, castellan of Czersk since 1777, Court Treasurer since 1791, Marshal of the Sejm of the Duchy of Warsaw in 1809 and later President of the Senate of the Duchy of Warsaw and the Kingdom of Poland.

He was a member of the Permanent Council (Rada Nieustająca), and an opponent of the Targowica Confederation. He was a member of the "Zgromadzenie Przyjaciół Konstytucji Rządowej" (Friends of the 3 May Constitution). He was politically tied to King Stanisław II Augustus, and he also participated in the "Thursday dinners" held annually by the king in his palace in Warsaw.

He was the founder of Tomaszów Mazowiecki

== Biography ==
Son of Piotr Ostrowski and Konstancja Stoińska. In 1765 he married Józefa Godlewska, with whom he had a daughter Julia. After the death of Józefa in 1780 he married Apolonia Ledóchowska (in 1781), with whom he had nine children most notably Antoni Jan Ostrowski, General Commander of the National Guard during the November Uprising and Władysław Ostrowski, Marshal of the Sejm of the Polish Kingdom in 1830. After the death of his second wife in 1795, Ostrowski married Apolonia Kunegunda Brzozowska.

In 1764 he supported the election of King Stanisław II Augustus. A true hero of the country, he restrained the king from accession to the Targowica Confederation and he was subsequently imprisoned by the Russians. In 1765, was a colonel in the royal army and became royal chamberlain in 1767. Ostrowski was Member of the Confederation of Andrzej Mokronowski in 1776. Ostrowski became the castellan of Czersk in 1777. In the years 1776, 1778, 1782 and 1786 he was a member of the Permanent Council. In 1788 he founded the metallurgical village of Tomaszowe Kuźnice, which was granted the status of an industry and trade village (osada fabryczno-handlowa) in 1824, designated a city in 1830 and was renamed to Tomaszów Mazowiecki. He was a member of the Four-year Sejm. In 1791 he was proclaimed the Treasurer of the Crown. He was one of the founders of the Friends of the Constitution Assembly Government. During the Polish-Russian war, at the meeting of 23 July 1792 he strongly opposed the decision of King Stanisław II Augustus on his accession to the Confederation of Targowica and he enhanced to revolt against the Russians and the administration which had control over the Polish–Lithuanian Commonwealth. Later he became the Marshal of the Sejm of the Duchy of Warsaw in 1809 and later President of the Senate of the Duchy of Warsaw and the Kingdom of Poland.

He died on 5 February 1817 in Warsaw.

== Awards ==
- Knight of the Order of Saint Stanislaus, awarded in 1777
- Knight of the Order of the White Eagle, awarded 1780.

== Bibliography ==
- Tomasz Kitzwalter, Ostrowski Tomasz Adam (1735-1817), in: Polski Słownik Biograficzny [Polish Biographical Dictionary], vol. XXIV, Wrocław 1979, pp. 579–583 (biographical note in Polish).
