= Józef Ankwicz =

Polish noble and politician

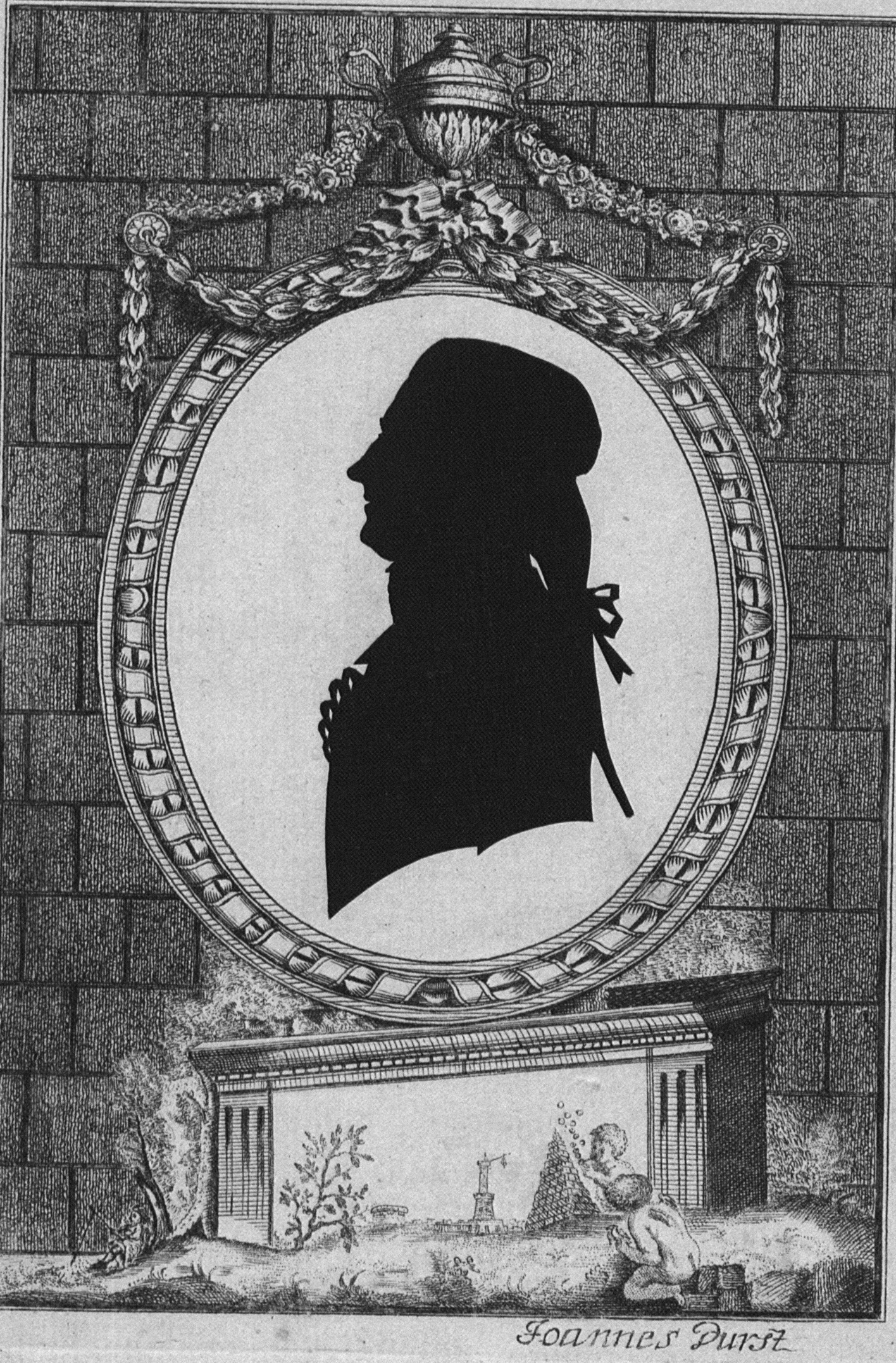

- Coat of arms: Abdank
- Born: c. 1750
- Died: 9 May 1794 (age 44); Warsaw
- Noble family: Ankwicz
- consort: Anna Biberstein-Starowieyska
- Issue: Andrzej Alojzy Ankwicz, Krystyna Antonina Ankwicz
- Father: Stanisław Walenty Ankwicz
- Mother: Salomea Schwarcemberg-Czerna

Count Józef Ankwicz (Polish pronunciation: [ˈjuzɛf ˈaŋkfit͡ʂ]; 1750 – 9 May 1794), of Awdaniec coat of arms, also known as Józef z Posławic and Józef Awdaniec, was a politician and noble (szlachcic) in the Polish–Lithuanian Commonwealth. He held the office of castellan of Nowy Sącz from 1782. Deputy to the Great Sejm, and the Grodno Sejm, for his actions during the latter he is considered one of the most prominent collaborators with the foreign partitioners of Poland.

== Biography ==
Son of Stanisław Walenty Ankwicz and Salomea Schwarcemberg-Czerny. Married to Anna Biberstein-Starowieyska, father of Andrzej Alojzy Jan Stanisław Ankwicz (archbishop of Lviv) and daughters Kordula and Krystyna.

He was also awarded with Order of Saint Stanislaus in 1781. In 1782 he received the office of castellan of Nowy Sącz. Elected deputy to the Sejms in the period 1782 - 1790, he was a member of the royal faction. In 1784 he received the Order of the White Eagle from king of Poland, Stanisław August Poniatowski, as well as the title of count (hrabia) from Empress of Maria Theresa of Austria-Hungary; later, he also received the office of Chamberlain at the Austrian court. He was a chief member of the diplomatic mission sent to Denmark in 1791, acting as the Polish ambassador. While in Denmark, he supported the Polish position and is said to have vocally opposed the Russian diplomats there.

In 1792 a number of Polish diplomatic missions were cancelled, and Ankwicz was recalled to Warsaw. This meant that he lost his main source of income. He was able to briefly return to Denmark, but the end of the Polish–Russian War of 1792 (after the passage of the Constitution of 3 May) saw him in Warsaw once again. Known for his lavish lifestyle, poor investments and as a gambler, he quickly fell in debts and was recruited by Russian ambassador and Jacob Sievers. He became associated with the Targowica Confederation. Subsequently, he was known for his support of foreign powers (Austro-Hungary, Prussia, Russian Empire), during the last Sejm of the Commonwealth - the Grodno Sejm of 1793, he was the leader of the "Russian Party" and the deputy who concluded that the unwillingness of other deputies to speak (threatened by Russian soldiers present in the room) means that they accept the demands of the Prussian and Russian Empires (the Second Partition of Poland). For that he was rewarded by his Russian masters with a pension and a position in the Permanent Council.

During the Kościuszko Uprising he was captured by the Polish revolutionaries. On the request of Polish Jacobins, he was sentenced by the summary revolutionary court to hanging, together with some of the leaders of the Targowica Confederation: Józef Kossakowski, hetman Piotr Ożarowski and hetman Józef Zabiełło. He was executed on 9 May 1794 in Warsaw, in the aftermath of the Warsaw Uprising, a part of the Kościuszko Uprising. His last actions earned him further recognition, as he gave the executioner a golden box, to commemorate the moment of the execution, and put the rope on his neck himself.
