= Władysław Ostrowski =

Polish nobleman

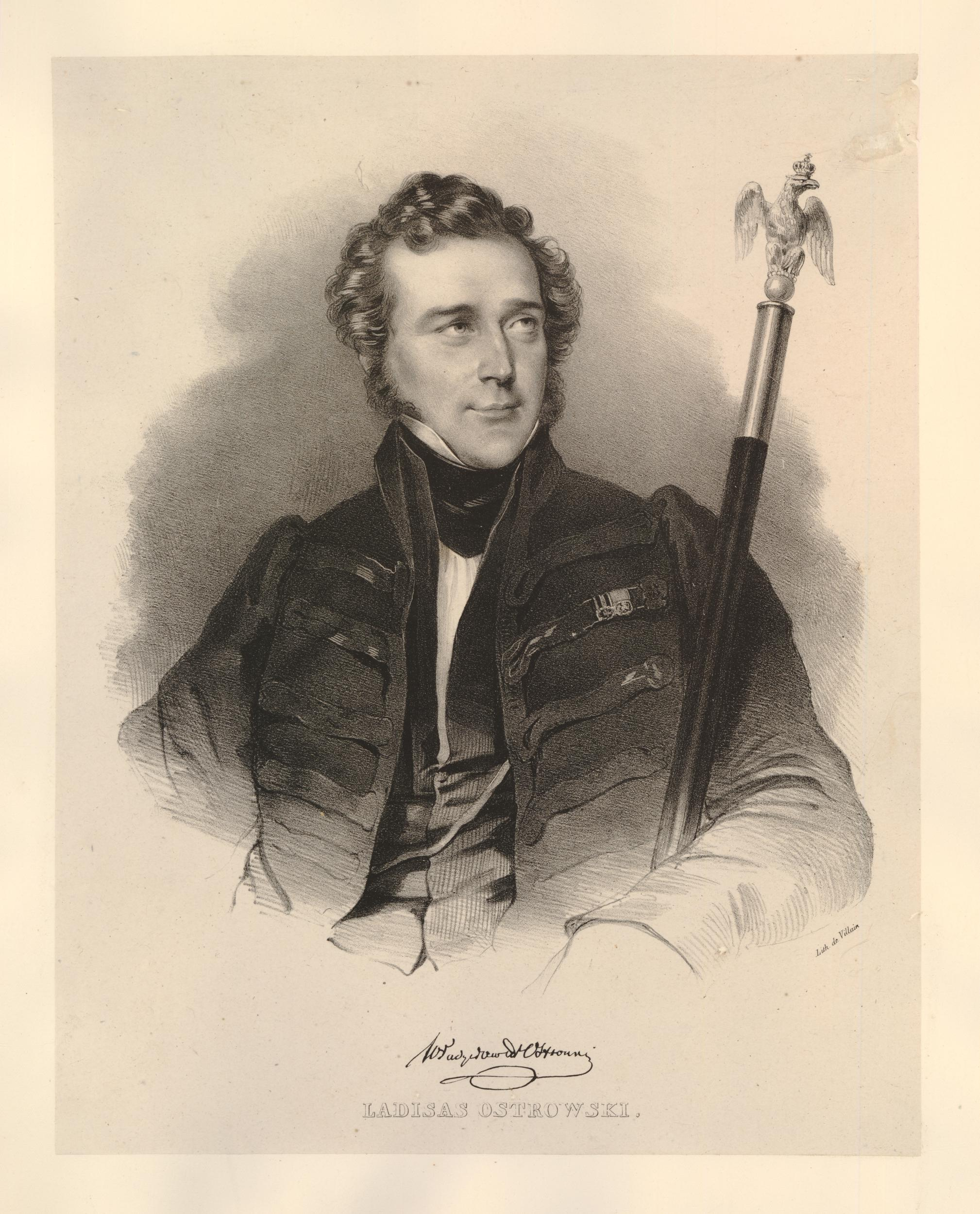
- Coat of arms: Rawicz
- Born: 7 March 1790; Warsaw, Poland
- Died: 21 November 1869 (aged 79); Kraków, Poland
- Noble family: Ostrowski
- Consort: Klementyna Sanguszko
- Father: Tomasz Adam Ostrowski
- Mother: Apolonia Ledóchowska

Wladyslaw Tomasz Rawicz-Ostrowski (1790-1869) was a Polish nobleman (szlachcic) and Count since 1798.

Wladyslaw was officer of the horse artillery in the army of the Duchy of Warsaw. He was awarded with the Virtuti Militari in 1809 after the Battle of Raszyn and with the Légion d'honneur order for Napoleon's Russian Campaign from 1812 to 1813.

He left the army after Napoleon's defeat. Later he tried his skills in poetry (he translated Lord Byron's poems). In December 1830 he was elected the Marshal of the Sejm of the Kingdom of Poland and served until the end of the national November Uprising of 1830–1831. In emigration he became an activist of Hotel Lambert. Interned by the Austrians he spent most of his life in Graz and in 1861 was allowed to settle down in Kraków.

== Awards ==
- Virtuti Militari in 1809.
- Légion d'honneur in 1813.
