= Jan Grot =

Former bishop of Krakow

Rawicz (Vrsin), coat of arms of Grot family

Jan Grot (Grotowic) was bishop of Kraków from 1326 to 1347. Initially, he was a fierce opponent of King Casimir the Great, whom he excommunicated in 1334. However, they reconciled in 1343.
