= Prazaroki =

Prazaroki Празарокі (Belarusian)
- Agrotown
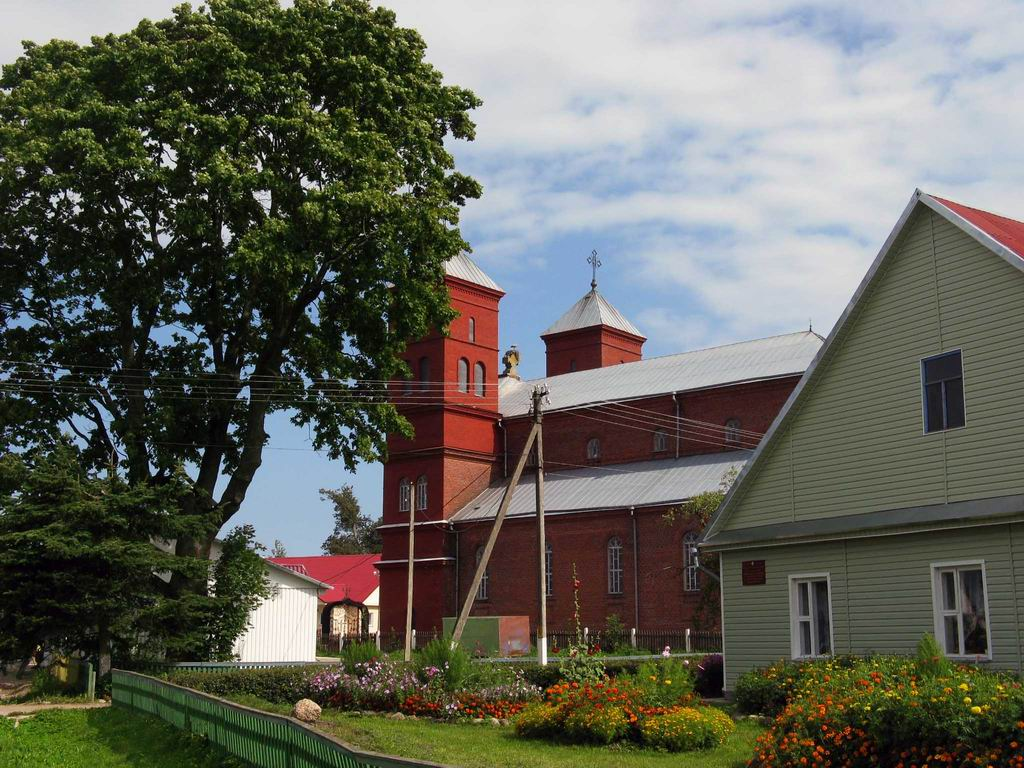
- Church of the Assumption of the Blessed Virgin Mary

- Location within Belarus
- Coordinates: 55°17′43″N 28°13′08″E
- Country: Belarus
- Region: Vitebsk Region
- District: Hlybokaye District
- Time zone: UTC+3 (MSK)
- Postal Code: 211817
- Area code: +375 2156
- Vehicle registration: 2

Prazaroki (Belarusian: Празарокі; Russian: Прозороки, romanized: Prozoroki; Lithuanian: Prozorokai; Polish: Prozoroki) is an agrotown in Hlybokaye District, Vitebsk Region, in northern Belarus.

== History ==
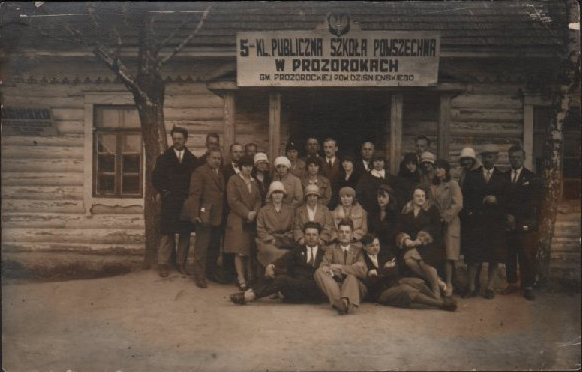
Primary school in Prozoroki, 1930

It was a private town of various nobles, including the Kuncewicz, Rahoza and Tukowicz families. In 1666, it was bought by Justynian Szczytt, who became a founder of the Franciscan cloister. It was administratively located in the Połock Voivodeship of the Polish–Lithuanian Commonwealth. During the Partitions of Poland it was annexed by Russia. Following the unsuccessful Polish November Uprising, the Tsarist authorities closed the Franciscan monastery in 1832.

In the interwar period it was part of Poland. In the 1921 census, 47.1% people declared Jewish nationality, 41.2% declared Polish nationality, and 11.4% declared Belarusian nationality.

Following the joint German-Soviet invasion of Poland, which started World War II in September 1939, the town was first occupied by the Soviet Union until 1941, then by Nazi Germany until 1944, and re-occupied by the Soviet Union afterwards, which eventually annexed it from Poland in 1945. Jews of the town were murdered in a mass execution perpetrated by an Einsatzgruppen.
