= Antoni Jan Ostrowski =

- Count
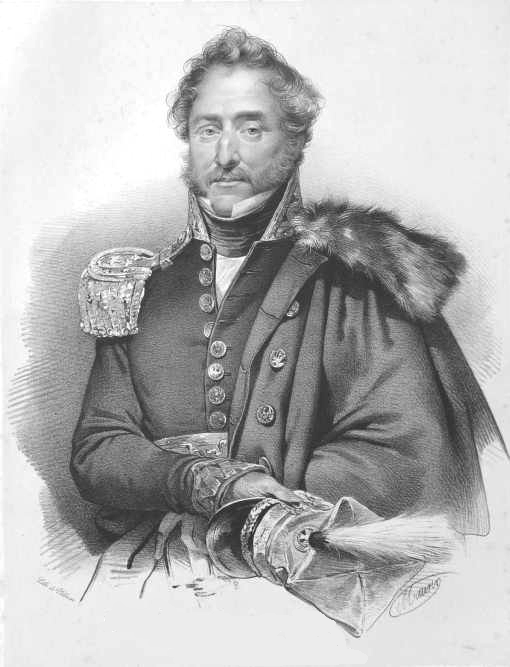
- Coat of arms: Rawicz
- Full name: Antoni Jan Ostrowski
- Born: 27 May 1782; Warsaw
- Died: 4 December 1845 (aged 63); Les Madéres, France
- Family: Ostrowski
- Spouses: 1. Józefa Morska (1789 – 1813); 2. Antonina Józefa Maria Michałowska (1799-1871)
- Issue: 15 children: Julia Olimpia Michałowska (1807-1875), the wife of the Polish painter Piotr Michałowski (1800-1855), Ignacy (1808-1809), Tomasz Antoni (1810-1871), Krystyn Piotr Celestyn Józef (1811-1882), Stanisław Kostka Władysław Kazimierz (1812-1889); Antoni Józef Tomasz Longin Juliusz (1822-1861), Ludwik (1823-1866), Józefa Maria Antonina (1824-1851), Jadwiga (1826-1832), Matylda (1827-1863), Zbigniew (1830-1832), Teresa (1831-1903), Tadeusz (1834-1911), Tekla Morawska (1837-1880), the wife of Tadeusz Morawski.
- Father: Tomasz Adam Ostrowski
- Mother: Apolonia Ledóchowska

Count Antoni Jan Ostrowski (1782–1845) was a Polish noble (szlachcic), landowner, political and economic activist, general and publicist.

He became senator-castellan and member of the Sejm in the Kingdom of Poland (1815–1830). Founder of the city of Tomaszów Mazowiecki. During the November Uprising in 1830–1831, he was appointed general and commander of the National Guards (Gwardia Narodowa) in Warsaw. After the collapse of the Uprising he emigrated to France.

== Works ==
- Pomysły o potrzebie reformy towarzyskiej... (1834)
- Pamiętnik z czasów powstania listopadowego (1961)

== Useful bibliography ==
- Ryszard Kotewicz, Antoni Ostrowski 1782-1845, ziemianin, przemysłowiec, założyciel Tomaszowa Mazowieckiego [Antoni Ostrowski 1782-1845, landowner, industrialist, founder of Tomaszów Mazowiecki], Warszawa 1995 (book in Polish; it includes photos, bibliography).
- W. Zajewski, Ostrowski Antoni Jan, in: Polski Słownik Biograficzny [Polish Biographical Dictionary], vol. XXIV, Wrocław 1979, pp. 546–550 (biographical note in Polish).
