= Adam Petrovich Ozharovsky =

Russian general

Count Adam Petrovich Ozahrovsky
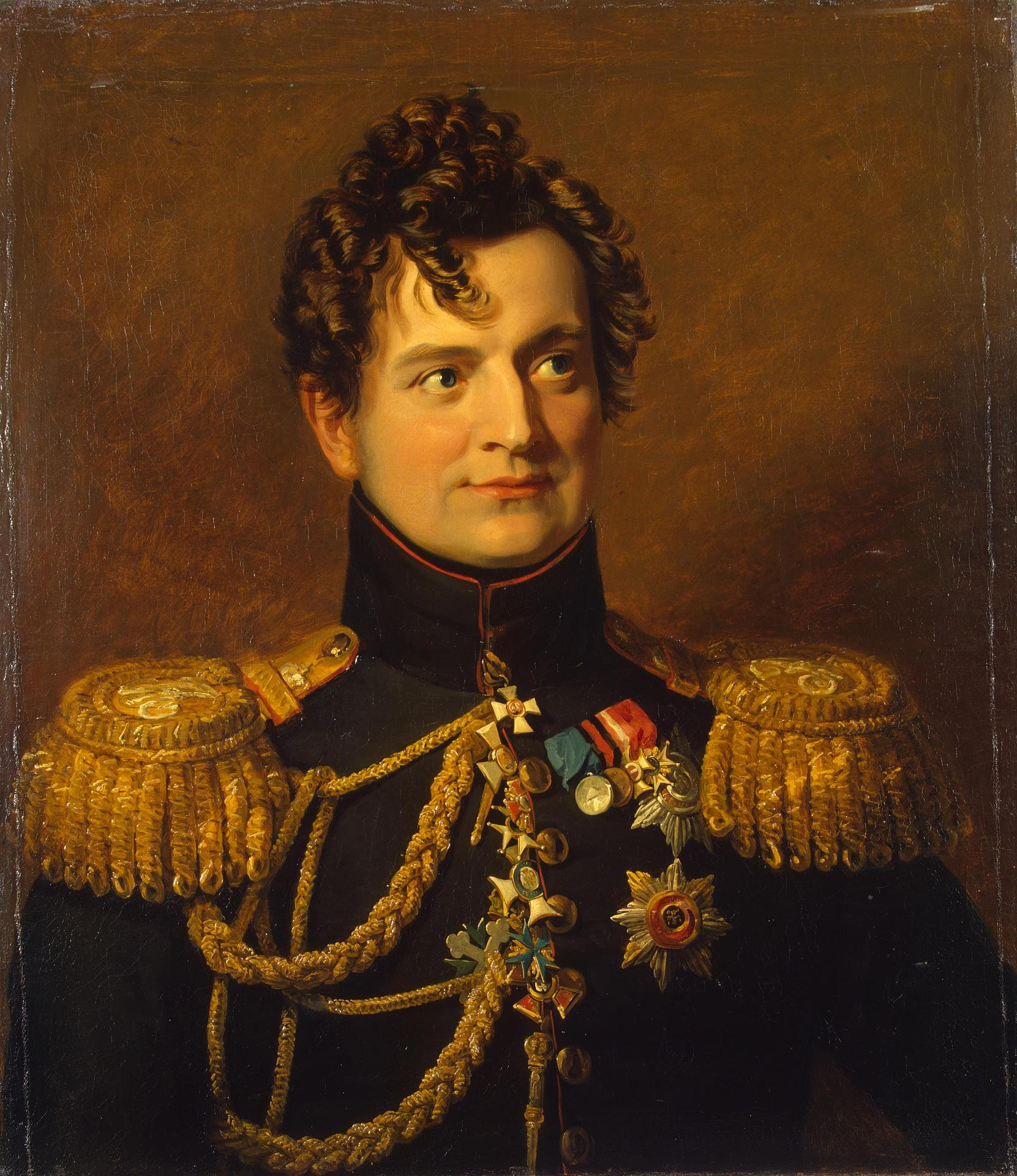
- Portrait by George Dawe
- Born: 1776
- Died: 30 November 1855 (aged c79)
- Military career
- Allegiance: Imperial Russia
- Branch: Imperial Russian Army
- Rank: General of Cavalry
- Conflicts: Napoleonic Wars
- Other work: State Councillor of Poland

Count Adam Petrovich Ozharovsky (Russian: Адам Петрович Ожаровский; Polish: Adam Ożarowski; 1776 – 30 November 1855, Warsaw) was a Russian general of Polish descent who distinguished himself during the Napoleonic Wars.

His father, hetman Piotr Ożarowski, was seized by the insurrectionists and charged with treason during the Warsaw Uprising, which took place from April 17 to April 19, 1794. He was sentenced to death and executed by hanging three weeks after the insurrectionists gained control of the Polish capital, on May 9, 1794.

Possibly as a consequence of this, Adam entered the Russian service. Emperor Paul had him dismissed from the imperial service and committed to prison in 1798; he was pardoned the following day, without any explanation. In 1806, upon her divorce from Count Pahlen, Ozharovsky married Maria, great niece of Prince Potemkin and the last Countess Skavronskaya.

In September 1802 Ozharovsky was promoted Colonel and took part in all the Napoleonic Wars that followed. During the Battle of Austerlitz he took hold of the French banner, an exploit which won him the Order of Saint George. He also excelled in the Battle of Friedland, which claimed the life of his brother. On 22 July 1807 Ozharovsky was promoted Major General.

Ozharovsky played a prominent part in the Patriotic War of 1812. An admirer of the military theories of Ernst von Pfuel, he was put in charge of the camp of Russian forces near the Drissa River. At Tarutino and Maloyaroslavets, Ozharovsky commanded a separate corps of Cossacks and peasant militia. His "flying column" was stationed at Krasnoi, when the Imperial Guard attacked the town and succeeded in ousting Ozharovsky from it.

During the foreign campaigns of the Russian army, Ozharovsky fought in all major battles and took 20 French cannons at Sompuis. At the close of the war, he was promoted to Full General of Cavalry. He served as Alexander I's aide-de-camp and was appointed a senator on 6 December 1826. Ozharovsky fell out with the next emperor and settled into retirement in 1827 but returned to take part in the suppression of the November Uprising in 1831. At the time of his death, he was a member of the State Council of Poland.
