= Hubina, Lyepyel district =

Village in Lyepyel District, Belarus

Hubina Губіна (Belarusian)
- Village
- Location within Belarus
- Coordinates: 55°02′25″N 28°56′54″E
- Country: Belarus
- Region: Vitebsk Region
- District: Lyepyel District
- Time zone: UTC+3 (MSK)

Hubina (Belarusian: Губіна; Russian: Губино, romanized: Gubino) is a village in Lyepyel District, Vitebsk Region, Belarus.

== History ==
In the 19th century Hubina was in Lepelsk County.

Owners of Hubin were Bużycki family, Szczytt family (since 1654) and Korsak family (since 1852).

== Demographics ==
- 2010 - 157 inhabitants
- 1999 - 221 inhabitants

== Bibliography ==
- Słownik Geograficzny Królestwa Polskiego i innych krajów słowiańskich, Vol. 3, p. 197.
