= Sejm ekstraordynaryjny =

Sejm ekstraordynaryjny, sejm nadzwyczajny (special sejm) was a kind of sejm in pre-partition Polish–Lithuanian Commonwealth. It could be convened by the King in special occasions (e.g. war) for two or three weeks.

In 1637 Rejm Walny prohibited convening sejm ekstraordynaryjny.

== Bibliography ==
- Lewandowska-Malec, Izabela (2007). "Sejmy nadzwyczajne w dziejach polskiego parlamentaryzmu". Studia z dziejów prawa i państwa polskiego. 10: 51–62.
