= Szczytt =

Jastrzębiec Coat of Arms

Niemirowicz-Szczytt (Polish: [ɲɛmiˈrɔvit͡ʂ ˈʂt͡ʂɨt]; plural in Polish Niemirowiczowie-Szczyttowie) was a noble Polish family. It used Jastrzębiec coat of arms. They also used another forms of surname like Niemirowicz-Szczyt, Szczytt-Niemirowicz, Szczyt-Niemirowicz, Szczytt or Szczyt.

The family is directly descended from Jan Niemira of Wsielub, the boyar coming from the Grand Duchy of Lithuania who was adopted during the Union of Horodło by Wojciech Jastrzębiec, the then bishop of Kraków and granted Polish coat of arm Jastrzębiec.

Szczytt family belonged to the higher class of Lithuanian nobility (panięta) in the first half of 16th century.

== Notable members ==
- Jan Niemirowicz (d. before 1465), Lithuanian boyar, marszałek hospodarski, starost of Kłecko
- Andrzej Niemirowicz (1462–1540), voivode of Kiev, the second hetman of the Grand Duchy of Lithuania
- Jan Szczytowicz (d. 1519 or 1520), marszałek hospodarski during the reign of Zygmunt I Stary.
- Justynian Szczytt (d. 1677)
- Józef Szczytt (d. 1745), Mściław's castellan, member of parliament
- Józef Szczytt (d. between 1808 and 1817), Brzesk's castellan, member of parliament
- Justynian Szczytt (1740-1824), member of Permanent Council, member of parliament
- Feliks Szczytt (1789-1865), a priest
- Krzysztof Szczytt (d. 1720), Smoleńsk's castellan, member of parliament
- Krzysztof Szczytt (d. 1776), general
