= Jan Nepomucen Bobrowicz =

Polish guitarist and composer

- Born: 12 May 1805; Kraków, Poland
- Died: 2 November 1881 (aged 76); Dresden
- Occupations: Composer, publisher

Jan Nepomucen (de) Bobrowicz (12 May 1805 – 2 November 1881) was a Polish virtuoso guitarist, composer, music editor, and publisher. Franz Liszt called him "the Chopin of guitar".

== Life ==
Bobrowicz was born in Kraków. He studied the guitar in Vienna with Mauro Giuliani during 1816–1819. After a short career as a solo performer on the guitar, he worked as a secretary in the senate of Kraków. From 1832, he worked as an editor for the music-publishing firm of Breitkopf & Härtel in Leipzig, Germany. Later he ran his own publishing business. As an editor he was responsible for probably hundreds of titles, published mainly in Polish.

The venture which brought him probably the most fame was the 4th–10th editions of the original classical genealogical and heraldic reference, Herbarz Polski (The Polish Armorial), by heraldist and author Kasper Niesiecki (1682–1744). They appeared under Breitkopf & Härtel's imprint between 1839 and 1846.

As a composer, Bobrowicz wrote about 40 compositions for the guitar. Many of them are in the form of theme and variations. Stylistically, he belongs to the Romantic era – one of the few substantial guitar composers of the time, comparable to Johann Kaspar Mertz.

Bobrowicz died in Dresden aged 76.

== Selected works ==
- Grandes variations sur un duo de l'opéra 'Don Juan', Op. 6
- Air d'Ukraine varié, Op. 7
- Variations brillantes sur un thème original, Op. 10
- Six Valses et polonaise, Op. 11 (as Op. 11b version for flute and guitar)
- L'Impromptu variations, Op. 12
- Introduction, variations et polonoise sur un thème original des Tiroliens, Op. 13
- Variations sur la cavatine favorite de l'opéra 'Zelmira', de Rossini, Op. 16
- Distractions-rondeau brillant et facile, Op. 17
- Variations sur une valse favorite, Op. 18
- Quatre Marches, Op. 19
- Introduction et variations sur l'air polonais 'Ja ciebie nie zapomnę', Op. 20
- Souvenir de F. Hérold. Grand potpourri sur des motifs de l'opéra 'Zampa, ou La Fiancée de marbre', Op. 21
- Première grande polonaise, Op. 24
- Drei Märsche, Op. 25
- Variations de bravoure sur un thème de Caraffa, 'Oh! cara memoria', Op. 28
- Variations et polonaise sur un duo de l'opéra 'I Montecchi e Capuleti', Op. 30

== Editions ==
Robert Coldwell (ed.): J. N. Bobrowicz, Selected Works, 2 vols (Dallas: Digital Guitar Archive, 2005 & 2008). Vol. 1 contains a detailed biography in English and Polish by Krzysztof Komarnicki.

== Bibliography ==
- H. Batorowska: Jan Nepomucen Bobrowicz: polski wydawca i księgarz w Saksonii w czasach Wielkiej Emigracji (Jan Nepomucen Bobrowicz: Polish Publisher and Bookseller in Saxony during the Great Emigration) (Kraków, 1992).
- S. P. Koczorowski: "Bobrowicz, Jan Nepomucen", in Polski Słownik Biograficzny (Polish Biographical Dictionary), vol. 2 (Kraków, 1936), pp. 157–158.
- Z. Walczy: "Bobrowicz, Jan Nepomucen", in Słownik pracowników książki polskiej (Dictionary of Polish Book People), edited by J. Treichel (Warsaw, 1972), pp. 73–74.
- Jan Oberbeck: Jan Nepomucen Bobrowicz. Chopin gitary (Bielsko Biała, n. d. [2005]).
