= New Grodno Castle =

Palace in Grodno, Belarus

Coordinates: 53.677°N 23.828°E

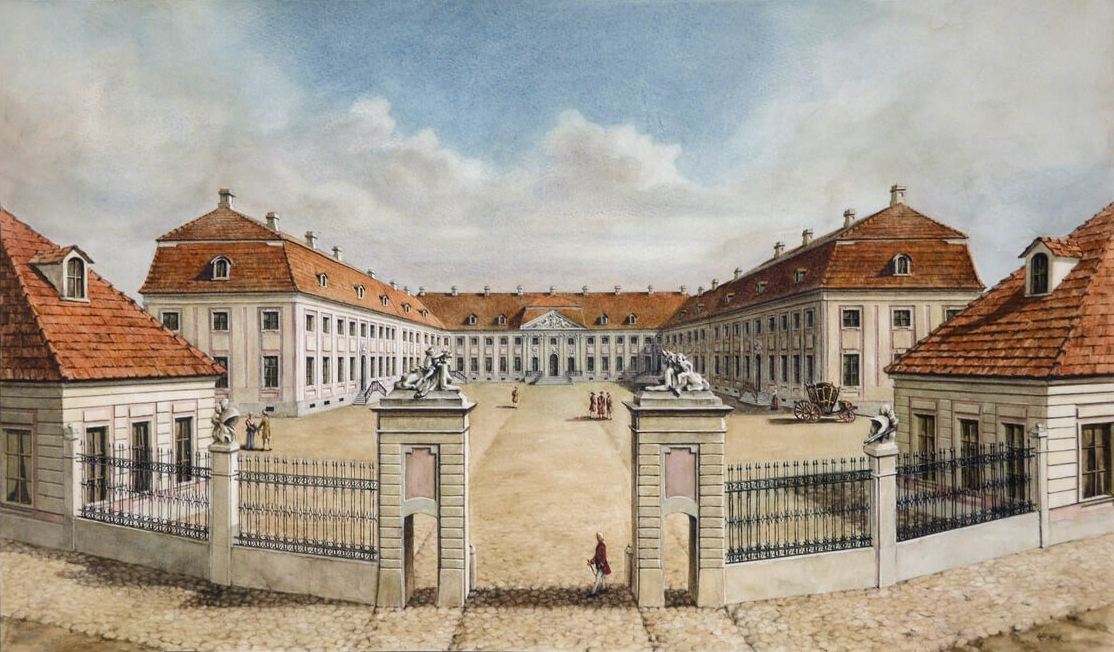
Main gates and entrance to the New Grodno Castle in the 18th century

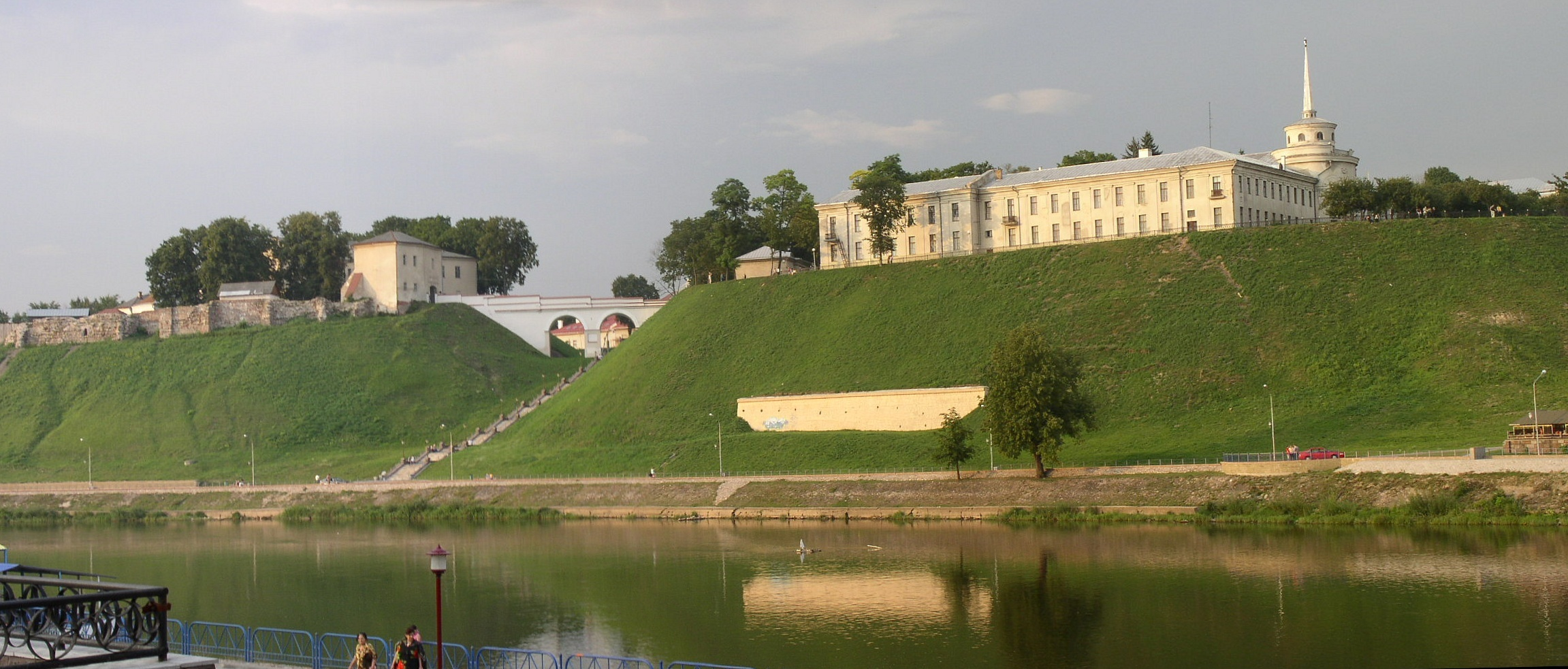
New Grodno Castle as seen from across the Neman River, with the Old Grodno Castle looming in the distance, in 2007

The New Castle (Belarusian: Новы замак, romanized: Novy zamak, Lithuanian: Gardino Naujoji pilis) in Grodno, Belarus is a royal palace of Augustus III of Poland and Stanisław August Poniatowski where the famous Grodno Sejm took place in 1793. New Grodno Castle is 116 metres (381 ft) above sea level.

The royal residence was built on the high bank of the Neman River at a little distance from the Old Grodno Castle which had suffered great dilapidation in the aftermath of the Swedish occupation in the early 18th century. The two castles are joined by a 300-year-old arch bridge.

The palace compound was designed by Carl Frederick Pöppelmann. Construction was carried out between 1734 and 1751 under the supervision of several other Saxon architects, including Johann Friedrich Knöbel and Joachim Daniel von Jauch. The palace was completed under the direction of Giuseppe de Sacco in 1789 and remained home for King Stanisław II August until 1797.

Used as a hospital and barracks throughout most of the 19th century, the palace was renovated by the Polish administration in the interwar period. Scarcely anything is left of the original fabric of the castle, whose refined Rococo detailing vanished during World War II. There followed a hasty and rather superficial refurbishing of the palace by the Soviets with a view to making it the headquarters of a local obkom.

A plaque on the wall of the palace commemorates the council of war held in the royal residence by Tadeusz Kościuszko on 30 October 1794.

== See also ==
- List of Baroque residences
