= Old Grodno Castle =

Castle in Grodno, Belarus

Coordinates: 53.677°N 23.823°E

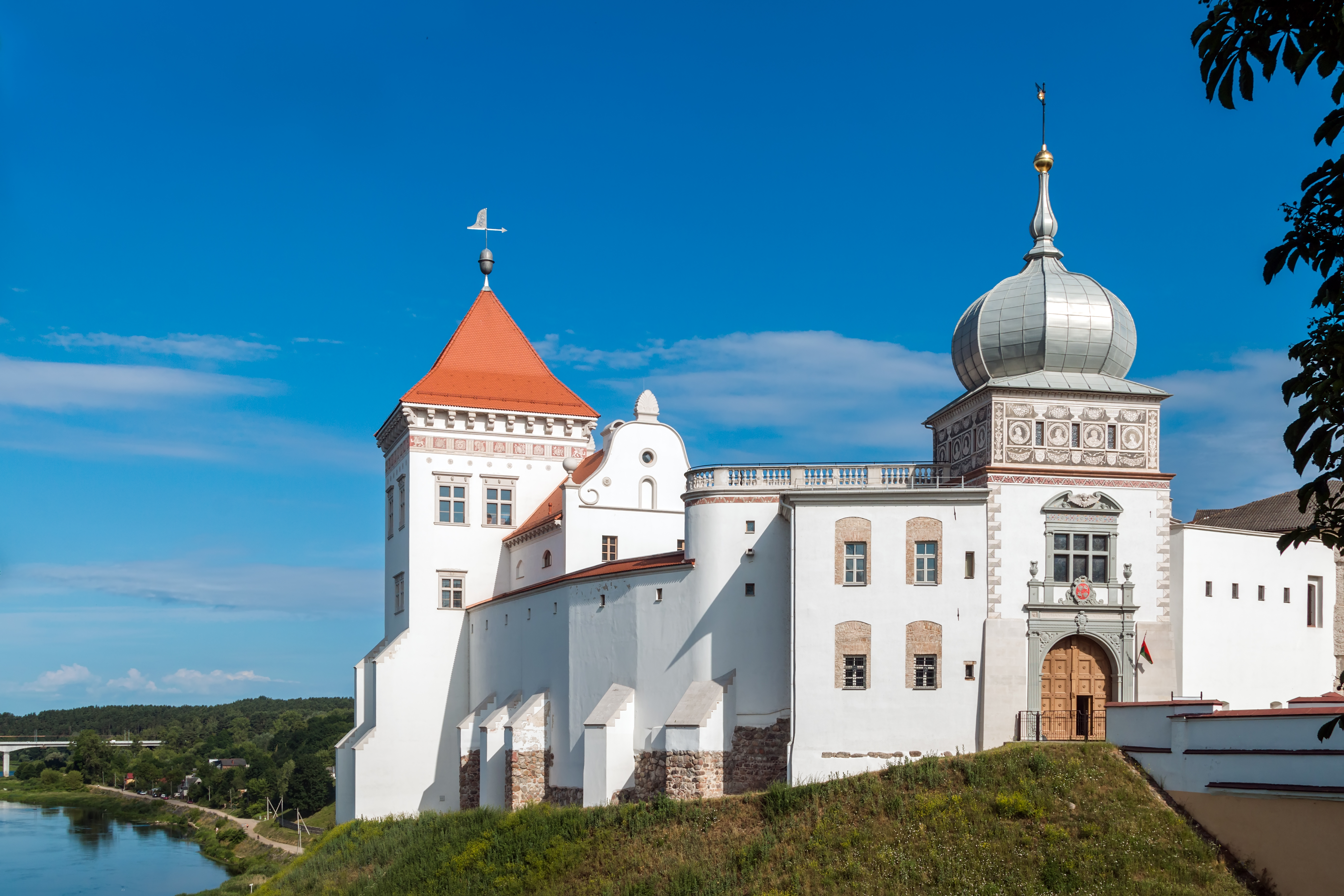
Reconstructed Bathory's Castle in Grodno, Belarus

The Old Grodno Castle (Belarusian: Стары замак, romanized: Stary zamak; also known as the Grodno Upper Castle and Bathory's Castle) in Grodno, Belarus, originated in the 11th century as the seat of a dynasty of Black Ruthenian rulers, descended from a younger son of Yaroslav the Wise of Kiev.

== History ==
=== Construction ===
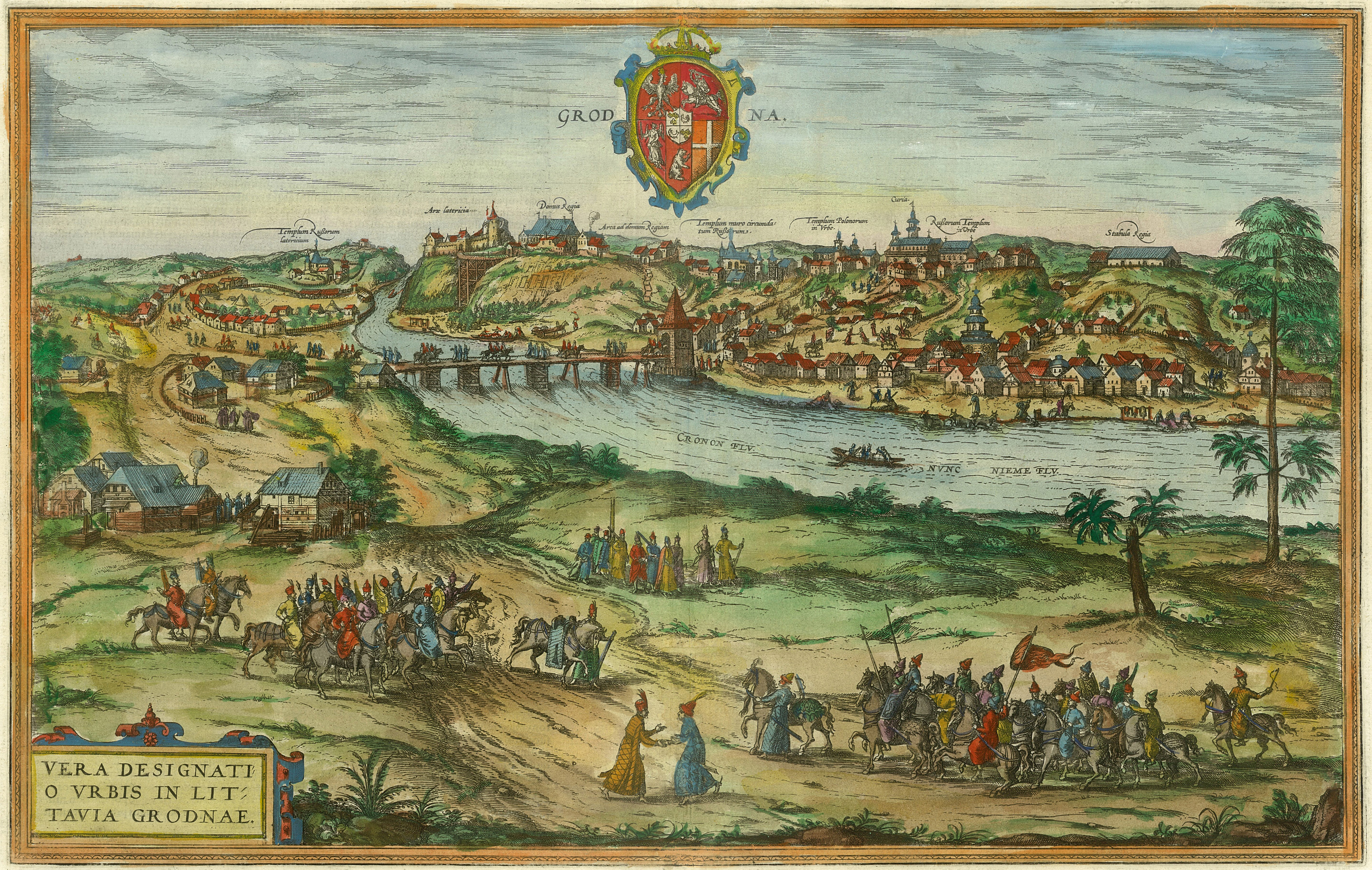
Panorama of Grodno with the Old Grodno Castle seen in the distance alongside river Neman, painted by Georg Braun and Frans Hogenberg in 1575

The first wooden castle was built in the 11th century at the confluence of the Neman and the Gorodnichanka rivers.

The 13th-century keep of the castle belonged to a type of Belarusian defensive tower represented by the Tower of Kamyanyets. Vytautas the Great rebuilt the castle in stone and added five Brick Gothic towers in 1391–98, transforming it into one of his main residences. Casimir IV Jagiellon also used to reside in Grodno alongside Lithuania's official capital Vilnius. It was there that the Polish Crown was offered to him, and it was there that he died in 1492.

The next notable tenant of the castle was Stephen Báthory who envisaged Grodno as one of the main residences of his vast empire in Eastern Europe. He engaged Scotto of Parma to replace the Vytautas Castle with his own residence in the advanced Renaissance taste of Northern Italy. After Bathory's death in Grodno in 1586, his pet project was abandoned. The citadel was devastated by the Russians during the Russo-Polish War in 1655.

=== Reconstruction ===
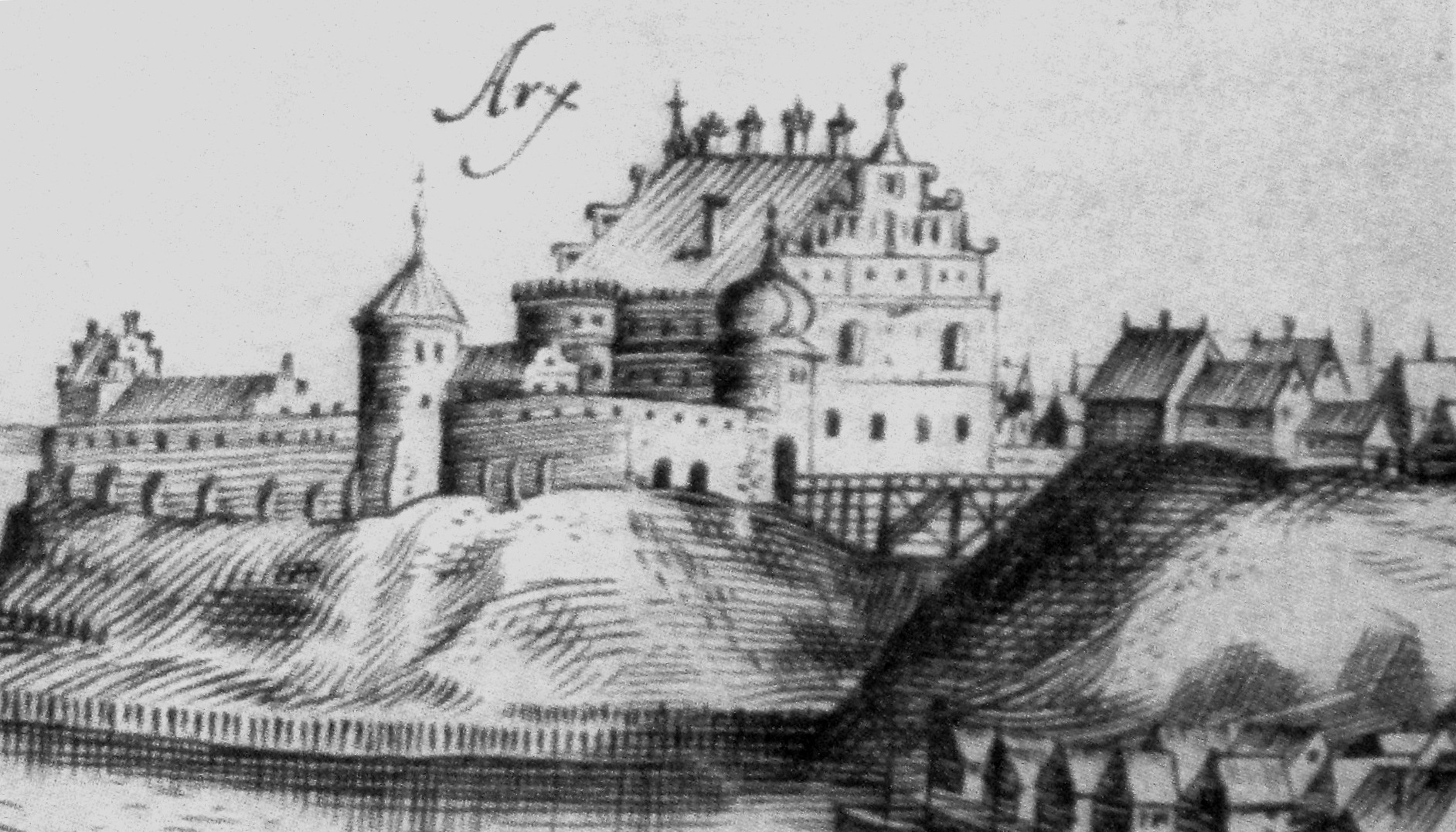
Old Grodno Castle, painted in the 17th century by Tomasz Makowski

The castle's revival took place in 1673–1678 due to Krzysztof Zygmunt Pac who raised sufficient funds to finance the refurbishing of the royal residence. The restored castle was selected by King Michał Korybut Wiśniowiecki of Poland as the location for every third Sejm of the Polish–Lithuanian Commonwealth. The castle suffered extensive damage during the Great Northern War, forcing the royal court to move into the New Grodno Castle.

After the partitions of Poland, the castle was given over to the Russian army and housed a barracks. The authorities of interwar Poland restored the Chamber of Ambassadors and the Sejm Hall.

=== Recent history ===
At present, the castle serves as a historical and archaeological museum with a collection of more than 200,000 artifacts, one of the largest in Belarus.

The newest reconstruction began in 2017. The restoration of the Old Grodno Castle was criticised for lacking historical authenticity. For instance, the contemporary viewpoint was added near the central gates. Some specialists disputed the restoration project; they found significant errors in the documentation that resulted from the constructor’s inability to read historical inventory descriptions written in Polish and German. For example, the shape of the dome above the central tower added levels between the towers and galleries. Some authentic 16th-century walls were demolished.

== Literature ==
- Ф. Д. Гуревич. "Древности Белорусского Понеманья". Ленинград, Изд-во Академии наук СССР, 1962.
- Szulakowska, Urszula (2018). Renaissance and Baroque Art and Culture in the Eastern Polish-Lithuanian Commonwealth (1506-1696). Cambridge Scholar Publishing. p. 319. ISBN 978-1-5275-1135-4.
