= Grodno Sejm =

Former Sejm of the Polish–Lithuanian Commonwealth

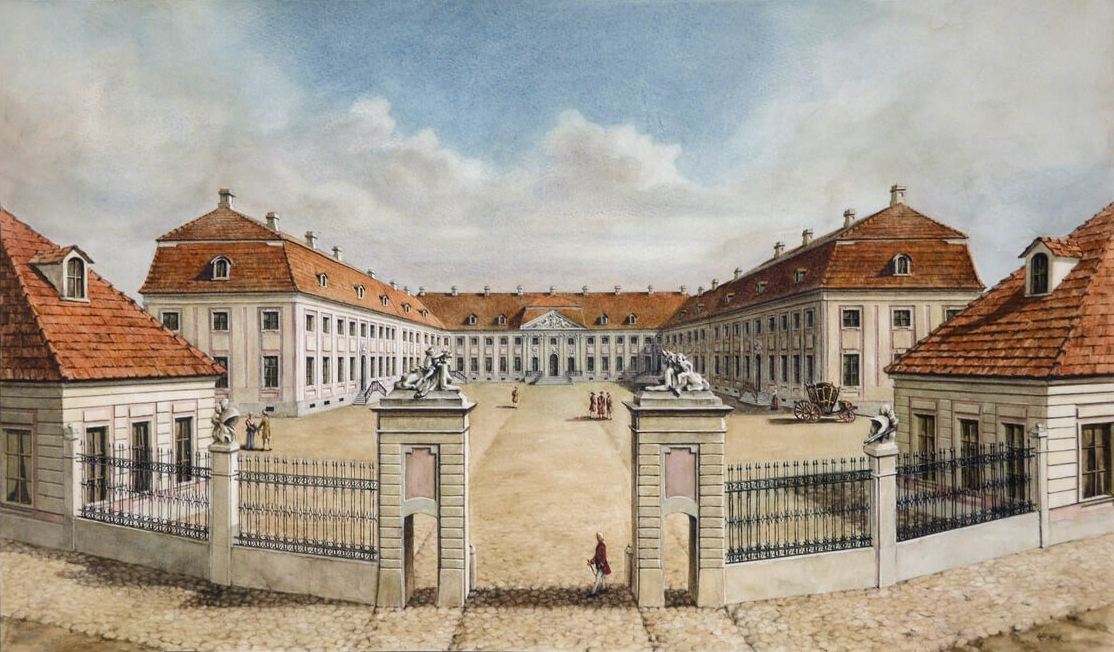
New Castle in Grodno, where the Grodno Sejm took place

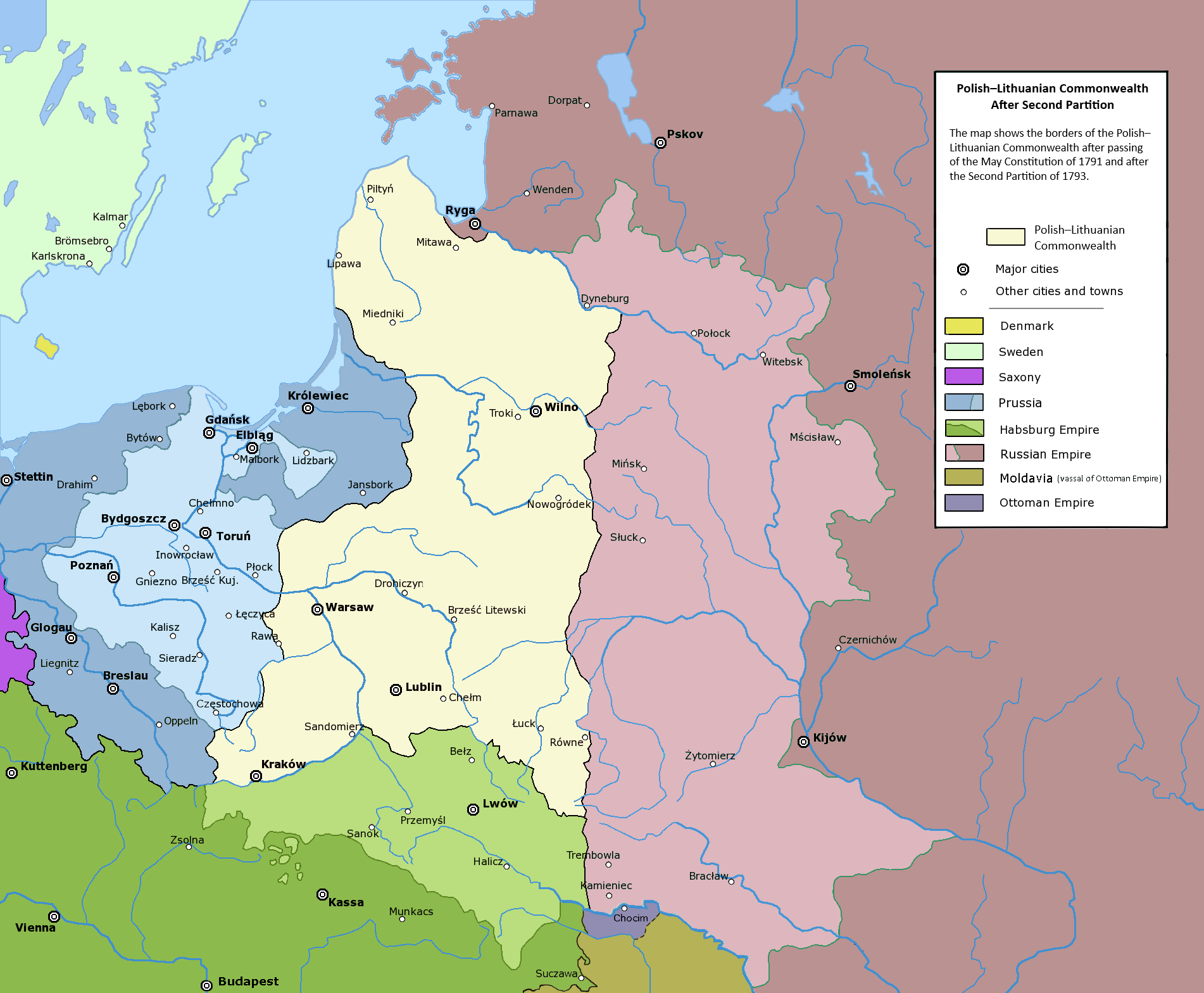
The Second Partition (1793)

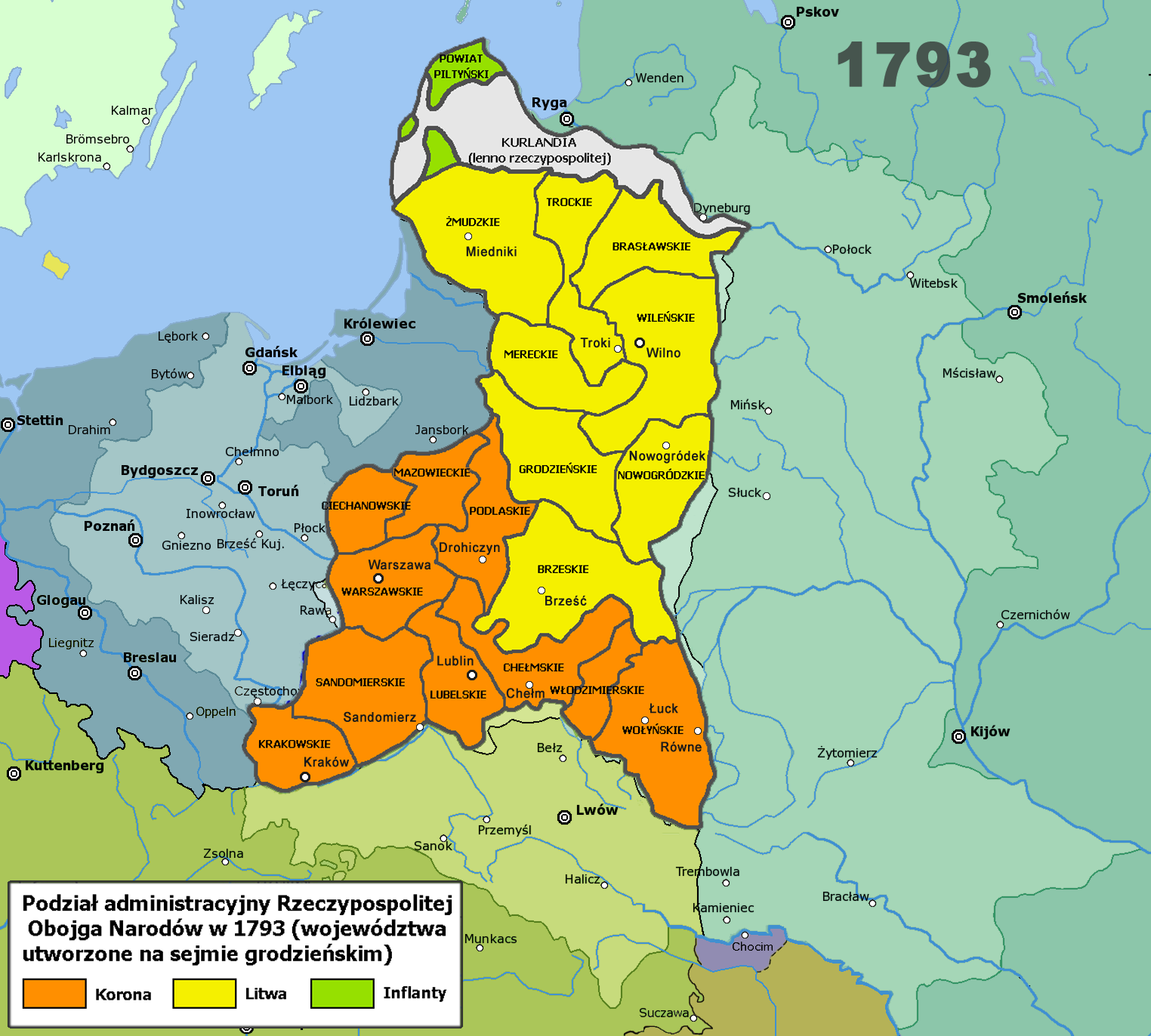
18 new voivodeships of the partitioned Commonwealth created by Grodno Sejm

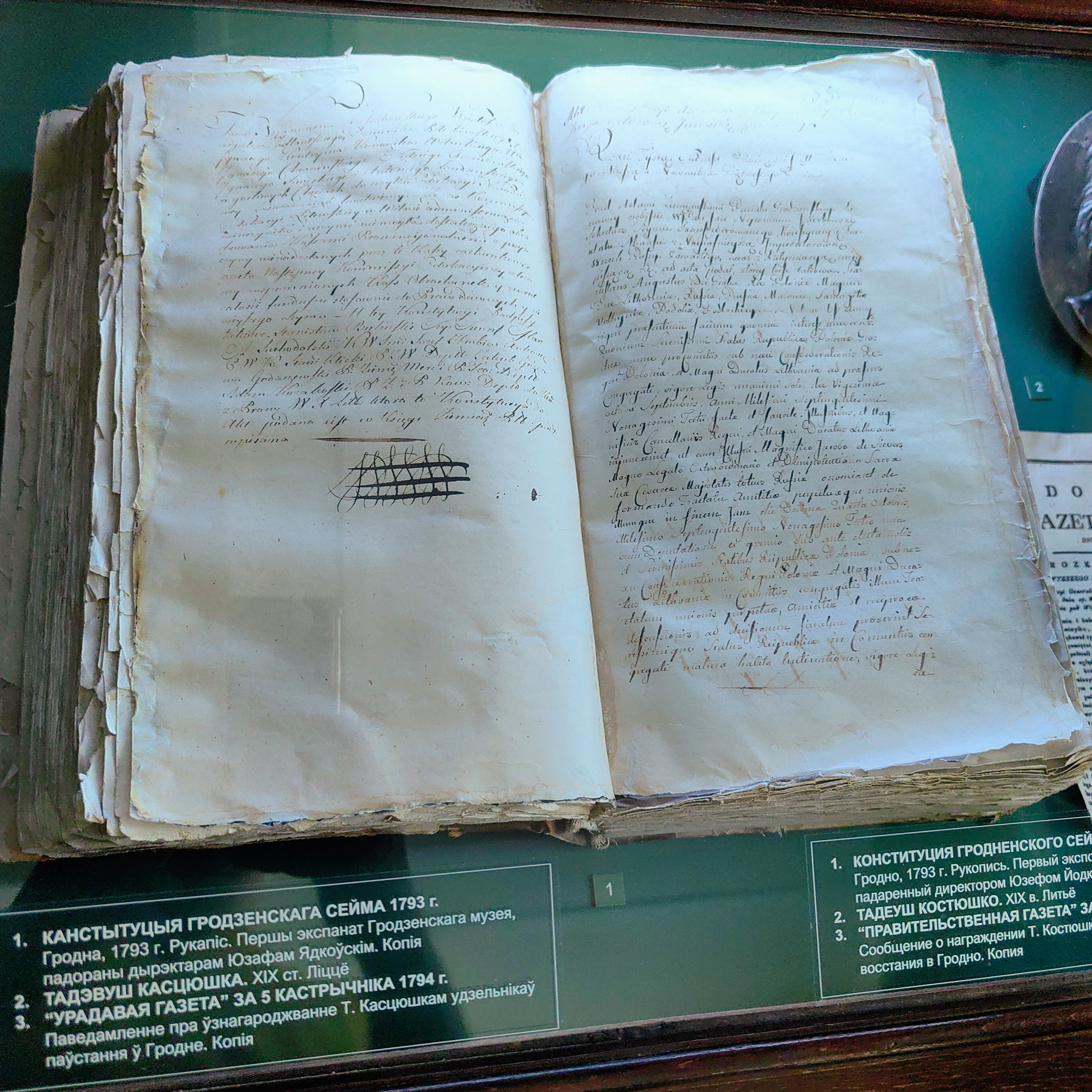
Copy of 1793 Sejm constitution in Hrodna New Castle museum

Grodno Sejm (Belarusian: Гарадзенскі сойм; Lithuanian: Gardino seimas; Polish: Sejm grodzieński) was the last Sejm (session of parliament) of the Polish–Lithuanian Commonwealth. The Grodno Sejm, held in autumn 1793 in Grodno, Grand Duchy of Lithuania (now Grodno, Belarus) is infamous because its deputies, bribed or coerced by the Russian Empire, passed the act of Second Partition of Poland. The Sejm started on 17 June and ended on 23 November 1793. It ratified the division of the country in a futile attempt to prevent its subsequent complete annexation two years later in the 1795 Third Partition of Poland.

== Background ==
The Sejm was called to Grodno by the Russian Empire after the Polish–Russian War of 1792 ended with the victory of Russia and its allies, the Targowica Confederation, in order to confirm Russian demands. Grodno was chosen for the Commonwealth's capital, as Warsaw was deemed too unsafe for Russians (and indeed it would prove so during the Warsaw Uprising next year). Many of the deputies were Russian supporters (like marshal of the Sejm, Stanisław Kostka Bieliński), with Russian representatives bribing some deputies and Russian armies forcing the election of their favoured candidate at local sejmiks. The Russians needed to use their army, as well as rely on bribery, in order to bypass the opposition of Polish–Lithuanian deputies, as initially, the sejmiks refused to elect enough deputies to satisfy the requirements of a national Sejm.

The Sejm was eventually called on 17 June. It was held in New Castle in Grodno in presence of Russian garrison stationed in and around the New Castle and commanded by Russian ambassador to Poland, Jacob Sievers, to ensure the obedience of all deputies; dissidents were threaten with beatings, arrests, sequestration or exile. Majority of the Senators chose not to attend the proceedings.

== Proceedings ==
Many deputies were not allowed to speak, and the main issue on the agenda was the project of 'Eternal Alliance of Poland and Russia', sent to the Sejm by Russian Tsarina Catherine the Great, and presented to the Sejm as the 'request of Polish people' by the Polish supporters of Russia. Nonetheless, out of 140 deputies present about 25 vocally protested against the proposal, especially against the Prussian territorial demands. On 2 July the Russian troops surrounded the town, and several deputies (Szymon Szydłowski, Dionizy Mikoreski, Antoni Karski and Szymon Skarżyński) were arrested. With further threats and actions by Russians, on 14 October 1793 the alliance was passed by "acclamation". In fact, after a long debate, around 4 a.m., with Russian forces present and preventing anybody from leaving the room, the marshal of the Sejm asked three times if there is agreement to pass the act. When not a single deputy spoke, Józef Ankwicz, another known supporter of foreign powers, declared that it was as unanimous vote of support ("He who is silent means agreement").

It was not the first time Russian Empire used such strategy: the fate of the Grodno Sejm resembled that of the Silent Sejm of 1717 – where the only person allowed to speak was the marshal of the Sejm or the Repnin Sejm of 1767–1768, where opponents of Russian intervention were arrested and exiled to Russia.

The Sejm passed the following acts:

1. the Eternal Alliance of Poland and Russia: Poland became a subservient Russian ally, in effect a Russian protectorate. Russian Empire was granted the right to have bases in Poland and the right to move forces through Polish territory at will. Poland was not to sign any alliances without Russian approval and to have sent diplomatic missions to foreign countries only together with Russians ones
2. territorial changes: granting parts of former Commonwealth territory to Russian Empire and Prussia
3. Constitution of May 3 was abolished, although some of its provisions granting rights to burghers were retained
4. certain Cardinal Laws (wolna elekcja (free election), liberum veto) were restored, together with the Permanent Council, now presided over by the Russian ambassador.
5. the Polish army was limited to 15,000 men
6. Polish highest military award, Virtuti Militari, recently created and awarded during the preceding 1792 war against Russia, was abolished

The Russian Empire guaranteed this new constitution, and sanctions for its violation were stated.

Due to significant territorial losses, the Sejm adjusted the administrative division of the Polish–Lithuanian Commonwealth and created 18 new voivodeships: brasławskie, brzeskie, chełmskie, ciechanowskie, grodzieńskie, krakowskie, lubelskie, mazowieckie, mereckie, nowogrodzkie, podlaskie, sandomierskie, trockie, warszawskie, wileńskie, włodzimierskie, wołyńskie, and żmudzkie (see map).

The Sejm ended on 23 November.

== Aftermath ==
Targowica confederates, who did not expect another partition, and the king, Stanisław August Poniatowski, who joined them near the end, both lost much prestige and support. The reformers, on the other hand, were attracting increasing support. In March 1794 the Kościuszko Uprising had begun. The defeat of the Uprising in November that year resulted in the final Third Partition of Poland, ending the existence of the Commonwealth.

== See also ==
- Silent Sejm (1717)
- Repnin Sejm (1767–1768)
- Partition Sejm (1773–1775)
