= Targowica Confederation =

1792 confederation of Poland and Lithuania

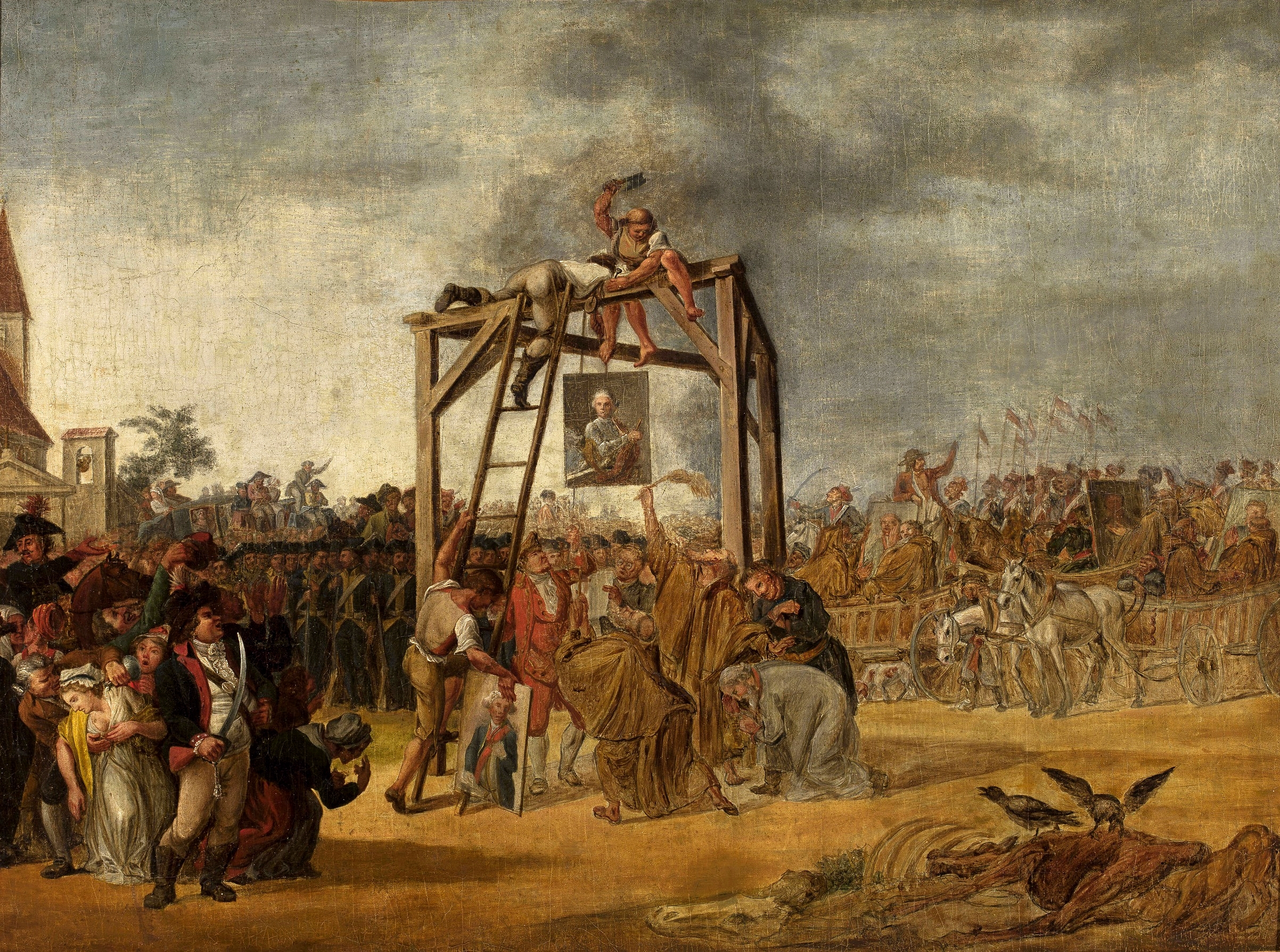
Hanging in effigy of the Leaders of Targowica Confederation, Warsaw, 1794, in the aftermath of the Warsaw Uprising (1794). Painting by Jan Piotr Norblin.

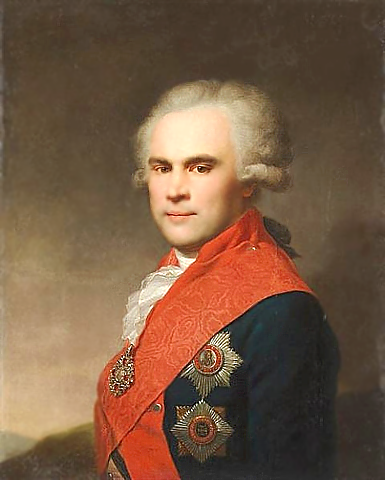
Russian general Vasili Stepanovich Popov, author of the text of confederation

The Targowica Confederation (Polish: konfederacja targowicka, IPA: [kɔnfɛdɛˈrat͡sja tarɡɔˈvit͡ska], Lithuanian: Targovicos konfederacija) was a confederation established by Polish and Lithuanian magnates on 27 April 1792, in Saint Petersburg, with the backing of the Russian Empress Catherine II. The confederation opposed the Constitution of 3 May 1791 and fought in the Polish–Russian War of 1792, which led to the Second and Third Partitions of Poland.

== History ==
The Targowica confederation opposed the Constitution of 3 May 1791, which had been adopted by the Great Sejm, especially the provisions limiting the privileges of the nobility. The text of the founding act of the confederation was drafted by the Russian general Vasili Stepanovich Popov, Chief of Staff of Prince Grigori Alexandrovich Potemkin. Its purpose was proclaimed in the small town of Targowica and the Potocki's estate (now in Holovanivsk Raion in Kirovohrad Oblast, Ukraine) on May 14, 1792. Four days later two Russian armies invaded the Polish–Lithuanian Commonwealth without a formal declaration of war.

The forces of the Targowica Confederation dealt some defeats to the armies of the Polish–Lithuanian Commonwealth, the Sejm and King Stanisław August Poniatowski in the Polish–Russian War of 1792. As a result, the King, Poniatowski, formally joined the Confederation. Their victory precipitated the Second Partition of Poland and set the stage for the Third Partition and the final dissolution of the Commonwealth in 1795. This outcome came as a surprise to most of the Confederates, who had wished only to restore the status quo ante and had expected that the overthrow of the May 3rd Constitution would achieve that end.

== Legacy ==
The term targowiczanin, which historically applies to each member and supporter of the Targowica Confederation, became a synonym for a traitor, just as Targowica is synonymous with treason. These meanings still function in the Polish language up to the present day.

== Leading members ==
- Stanisław Szczęsny Potocki: Marshal (head) of the Confederation. Sentenced to death, but never apprehended. Instead, on September 29, 1794, his portrait was hanged (see illustration). In 1795 he was rewarded by Catherine the Great with the Russian Order of Alexander Nevsky and the rank of Général en chef.

Other magnate members:

- Józef Ankwicz convicted of treason and sentenced to hanging on 9 May 1794.
- ambassador Karol Boscamp-Lasopolski hanged June 28, 1794.
- Franciszek Ksawery Branicki: Sentenced to death during the Kościuszko Uprising, but never apprehended. Having emigrated to Russia, he died at Belaya Tserkov, 1819.
- Szymon Marcin Kossakowski: Hanged in Vilnius on April 25, 1794, during the Kościuszko Uprising.
- Józef Kazimierz Kossakowski: Bishop. Hanged May 9, 1794, in Warsaw during the Kościuszko Uprising.
- Ignacy Jakub Massalski: Bishop. Hanged June 28, 1794, in Warsaw during the Kościuszko Uprising.
- hetman Piotr Ożarowski convicted of treason and sentenced to hanging on 9 May 1794.
- Seweryn Rzewuski Sentenced in absentia by the Supreme Criminal Court to death and the confiscation of his estates. Executed in effigy on 29 September 1794.
- Józef Zabiełło convicted of treason and sentenced to hanging on 9 May 1794.

== See also ==
- Hetman Party

== Quotes ==
- From the Establishing Act of the Targowica Confederation:

"The desires of Her Highness Empress of Russia [Catherine the Great], ally of Rzeczpospolita [the Commonwealth], are and were no other than by using her armies to return to Rzeczpospolita and Poles the freedoms, and especially security and happiness to all citizens"

- One of the founders of the Targowica Confederation, Stanisław Szczęsny Potocki:

"Each true Pole, not blinded by the Prussian and royalist cabal, is convinced, that our Fatherland can only be saved by Russia, otherwise our nation will be enslaved".

- After Stanisław Poniatowski's abdication and the destruction of the Commonwealth, Szczęsny Potocki said:

"About past Poland and Poles [I don't want to talk anymore]. Gone is this country, and this name, as many others have perished in the world's history. I am now a Russian forever."
