= Kasper Niesiecki =

Polish heraldist (1682–1744)

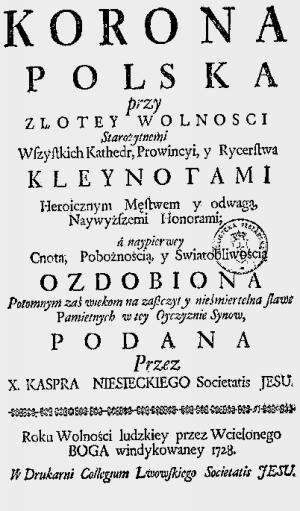
- Chronicle of the Polish Crown main page
- Born: December 31, 1682; Greater Poland
- Died: July 9, 1744 (aged 61)
- Years active: Polish–Lithuanian Commonwealth

Academic work
- Notable works: Herbarz polski Kaspra Niesieckiego

Kasper Niesiecki (31 December 1682 – 9 July 1744), also known as Kacper Niesiecki, was a Polish heraldist, Jesuit, lexicographer, writer, theologian and preacher.

== Biography ==
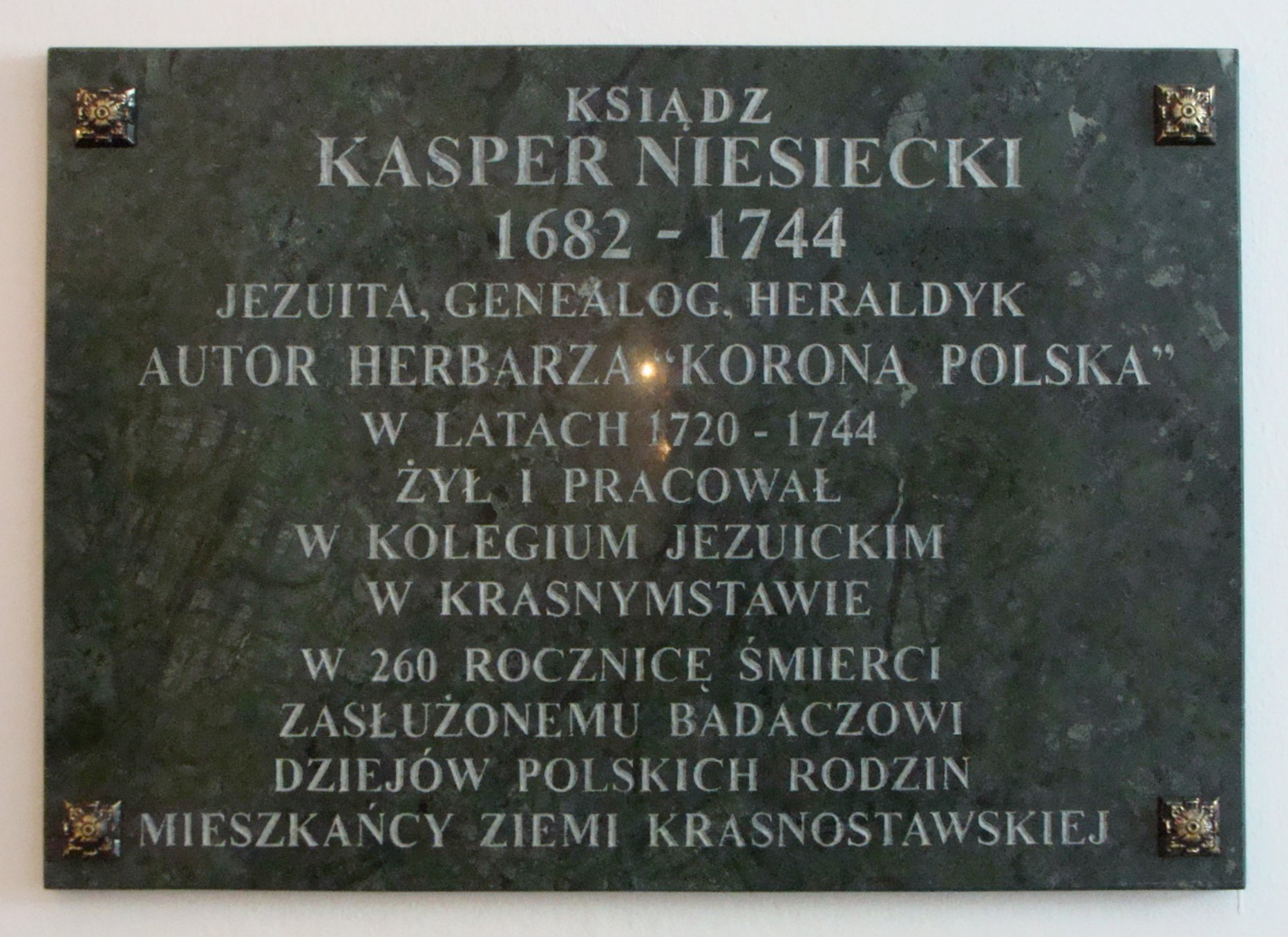
Commemorative plaque at former Jesuit Collegium in Krasnystaw

Niesiecki was born in Greater Poland to a burgher family. In 1699, he began training as a Jesuit in Kraków. From 1701 to 1704, he studied philosophy in Lublin, earning a master's degree. In 1707 Niesiecki started his studies in theology at the Jagiellonian University, graduating in 1711. He undertook further study in Lutsk, Krosno, Bydgoszcz, Chojnice and Kalisz.

Between 1715 and 1723, Niesiecki worked as a preacher in Masovia, Greater Poland, Lesser Poland, and Ruthenia. He taught rhetoric in Bydgoszcz and Chojnice, and ethics and mathematics in Kalisz. From 1724, he lived in the monastery of Krasnystaw, where he engaged in his life's work, compiling the Herbarz Polski (Polish Armorial or Polish Heraldic Register). Niesiecki died there on 9 July 1744.

The first volume of Herbarz Polski was published in 1728 in Lwów. Although Niesiecki initially intended to write the work in Latin, his patron, the Polish noblewoman Marianna of Potocki-Tarłowa, insisted that it appear in Polish. His commitment to avoiding unverified sources and legendary material provoked resistance from some members of the szlachta (Polish nobility). Despite this opposition, he continued the project, though the controversy contributed to delays in printing subsequent volumes. After the publication of the fourth volume, attacks from the nobility intensified, and they sent letters of protest to his Polish and German publishers. Work on the fifth volume was halted by Niesiecki's death; it was completed by Stanisław Czapliński but never published. Historians consider Niesiecki's Herbarz to meet all internationally recognised standards of genealogical scholarship.

In the 19th century, the armorial was expanded by several authors and published by Jan Nepomucen de Bobrowicz in Leipzig.

== Polish Armorial ==
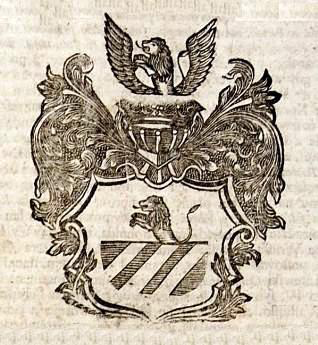
'Wolf' Coat of arms by Kasper Niesiecki

- Herbarz Polski (Polish Armorial) full title: "Korona Polska przy złotey wolnosci starożytnemi Rycerstwa Polskiego y Wielkiego Xięstwa Litewskiego kleynotami naywyższymi Honorami Heroicznym, Męstwem y odwagą, Wytworną Nauką a naypierwey Cnotą, nauką Pobożnością, y Swiątobliwością ozdobiona Potomnym zaś wiekom na zaszczyt y nieśmiertelną sławę Pamiętnych w tey Oyczyźnie Synow podana TOM ... Przez X. Kaspra Niesieckego Societatis Jesu", Lviv, 1738. (In English: "The Polish Crown, adorned with the ancient highest insignia, honours, heroic deeds, valour and courage of the Polish Knighthood and of the Grand Duchy of Lithuania, with refined learning and above all with virtue, piety, and holiness; presented to future ages for the honour and immortal glory of the sons of this Fatherland. Volume … By Fr. Kasper Niesiecki of the Society of Jesus (Jesuits).")
  - "Korona Polska..." vol. 1
  - "Korona Polska..." vol. 2
  - "Korona Polska..." vol. 3
  - "Korona Polska..." vol. 4
- edition expanded by other authors: Herbarz Polski... vol. 4-10, published by Jan Nepomucen de Bobrowicz, Leipzig, 1841
- Herbarz Polski... - some volumes

== See also ==
- Polish literature
- Polish heraldry
