= Grodno =

City in Grodno Region, Belarus

Grodno Гродна • Гродно Hrodna
- City
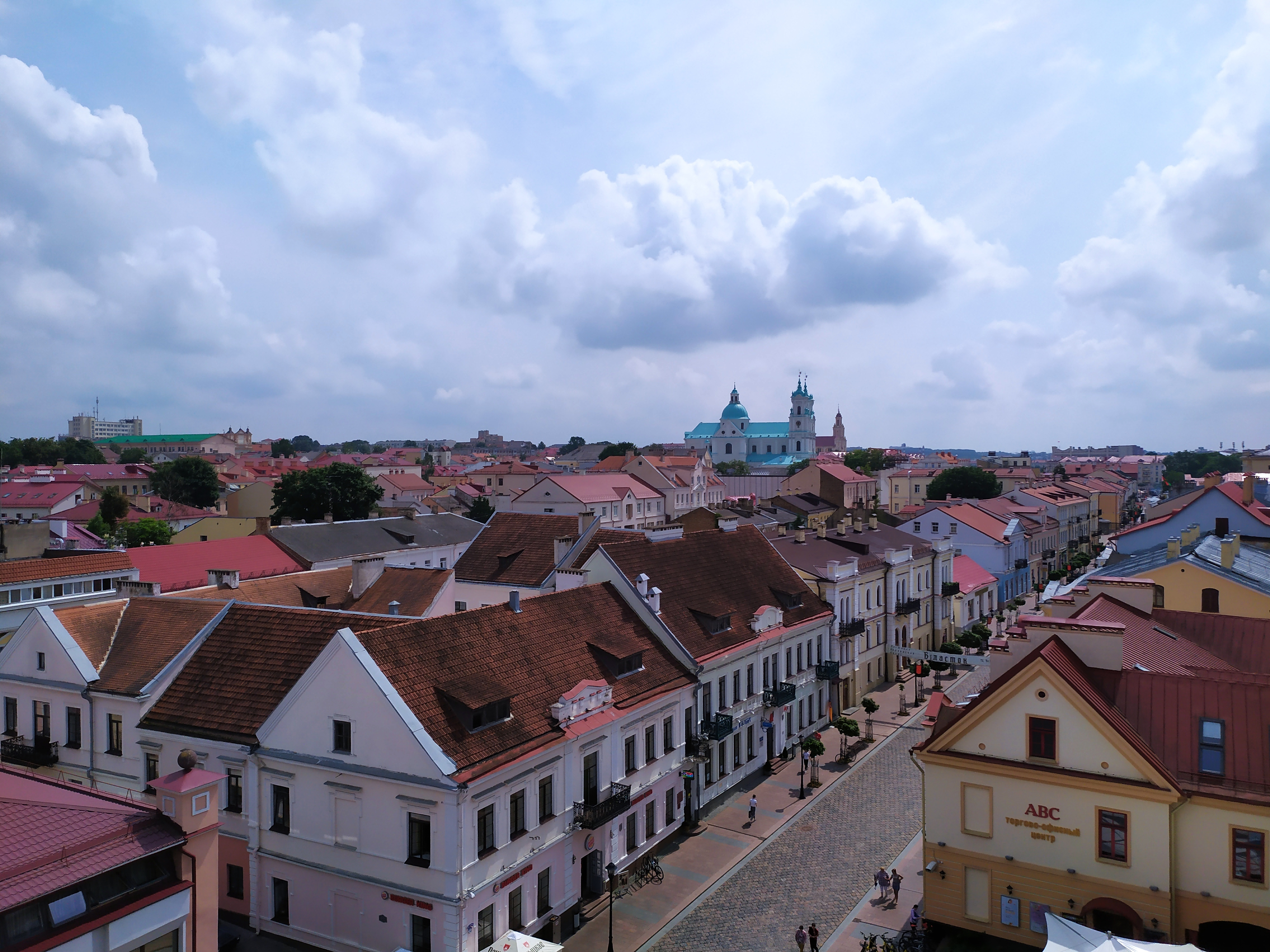
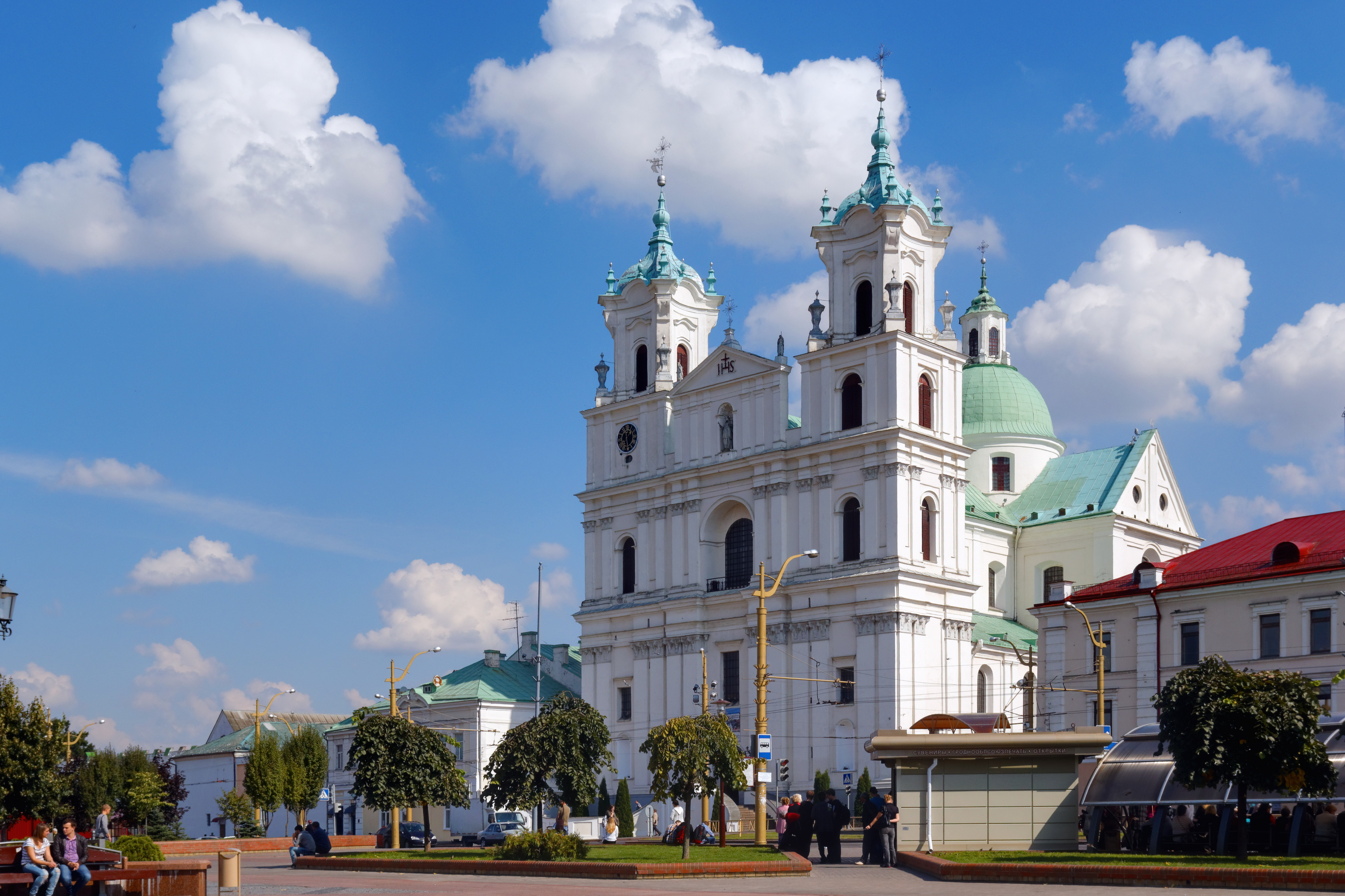
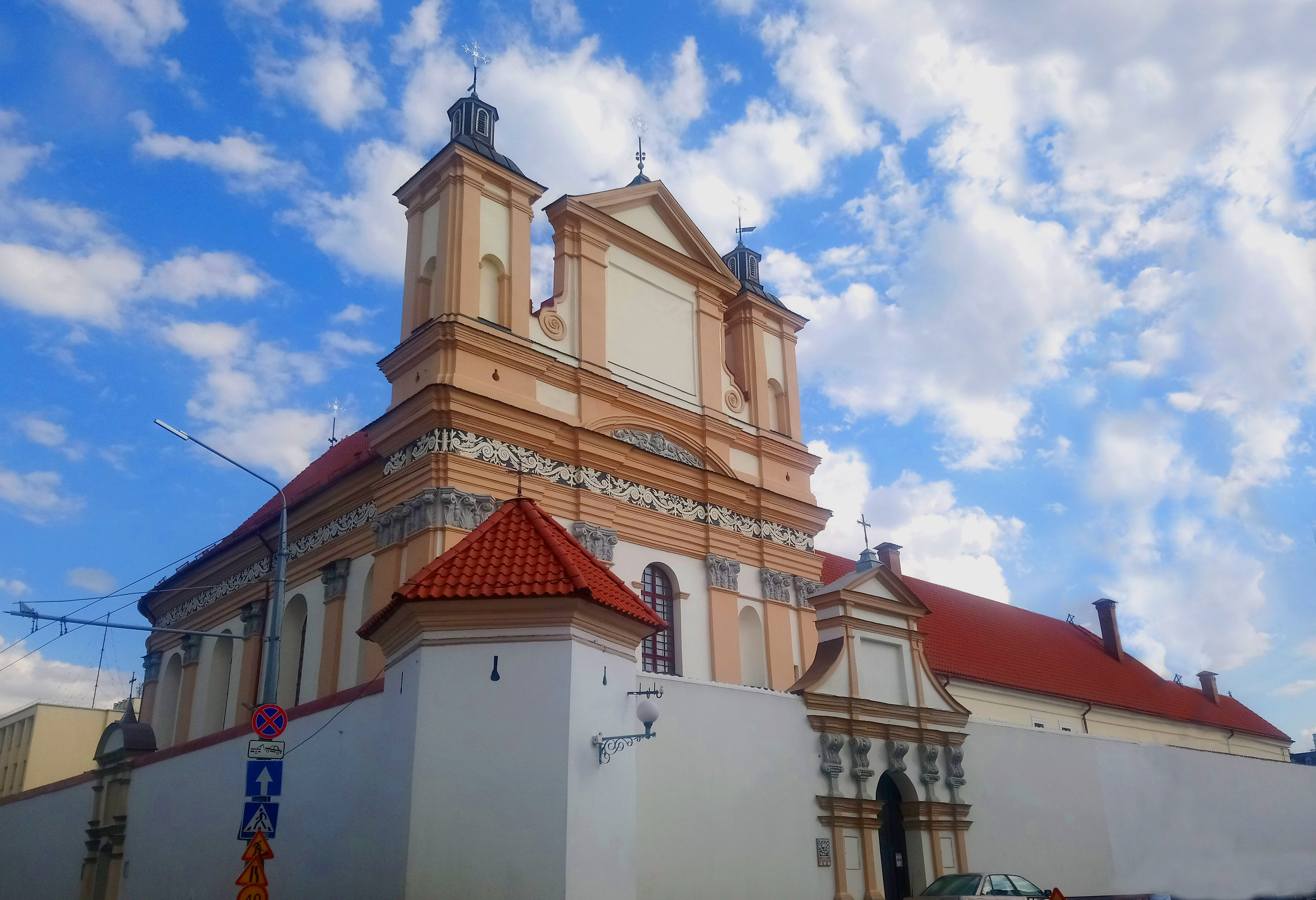
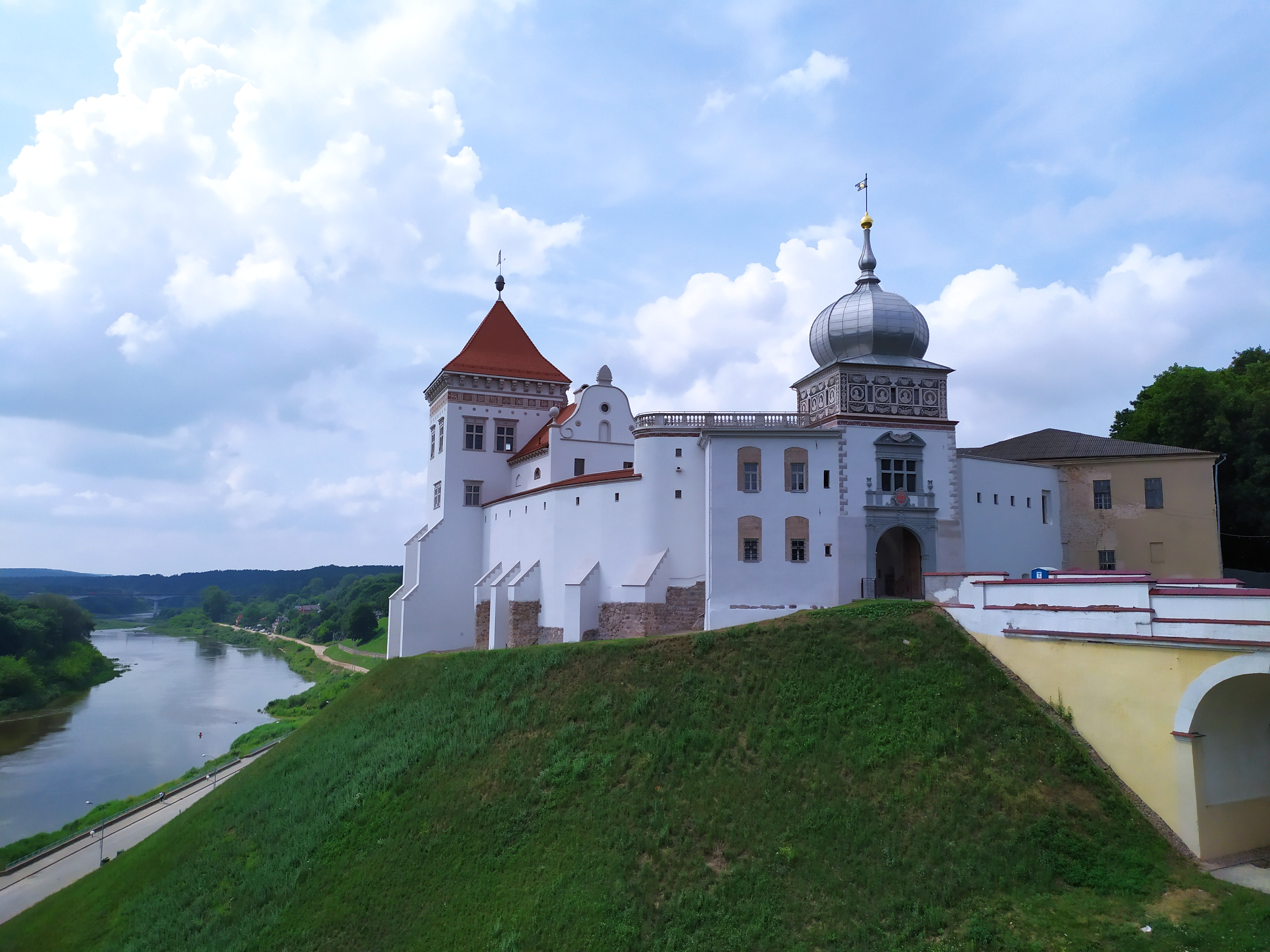
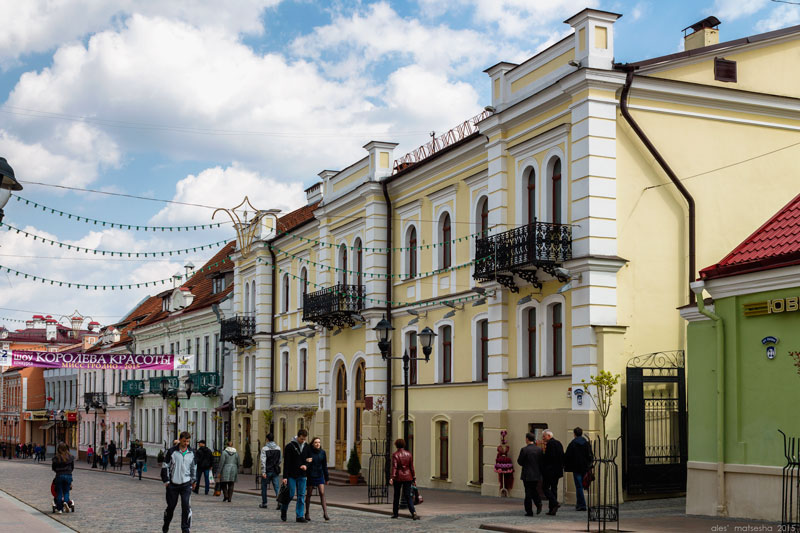
- Grodno Old Town St. Francis Xavier Cathedral Church of the Annunciation of Mary Old Grodno Castle Savieckaja Street

- Flag Coat of arms
- Interactive map of Grodno
- Location within Belarus Location within Europe
- Coordinates: 53°40′N 23°50′E
- Country: Belarus
- Region: Grodno Region
- Founded: 1127

Government
  - Chairman: Andrei Khmel

Area
  - Total: 142.11 km^{2} (54.87 sq mi)
- Elevation: 137 m (449 ft)

Population (2025)
  - Total: 363,718
  - Density: 2,559.4/km^{2} (6,628.8/sq mi)
- Time zone: UTC+3 (MSK)
- Postal code: 230000
- Area code: +375-15
- License plate: 4
- Website: Official website

Grodno, (Note: Russian: Гродно [ˈɡrodnə]; Yiddish: גראָדנע; Polish: Grodno [ˈɡrɔdnɔ]; Lithuanian: Gardinas) or Hrodna, (Note: Belarusian: Гродна, IPA: [ˈɣrɔdna]) is a city in western Belarus. It is one of the oldest cities in Belarus. The city is located on the Neman River, 300 kilometres (190 mi) from Minsk, about 15 kilometres (9.3 mi) from the border with Poland, and 30 kilometres (19 mi) from the border with Lithuania. Grodno serves as the administrative center of Grodno Region and Grodno District, though it is administratively separated from the district. As of 2025, the city has a population of 363,718.

The modern city of Grodno, founded in 1127, originated as a small fortress and trading outpost, on the extreme northern end of the deeply penetrated Slavic peninsula into the lands of the Baltic tribal union of the Yotvingians. It was also a home to the Dregoviches Slavic tribe. It was a significant city in Black Ruthenia and later part of the Grand Duchy of Lithuania, which joined the Polish-Lithuanian Union in 1385. Grodno faced numerous invasions, most notably by the Teutonic Knights. The city was an important trade, commerce, and cultural center in the Polish-Lithuanian Commonwealth, and one of its royal residences. The Kings of Poland and Grand Dukes of Lithuania allowed the creation of a Jewish commune in 1389, and the city received its charter in 1441. Grodno was the site of two battles during the Great Northern War.

Grodno has a rich history with various rulers and influences. In 1793, Grodno became the capital of the Grodno Voivodeship, but was annexed by Russia in 1795 after Third Partition of Poland. The city had a significant Jewish population before the Holocaust. After World War I, it was briefly part of the Belarusian People's Republic and the Republic of Lithuania before being taken over by Poland. During World War II, it was occupied by the Soviet Union and later by Nazi Germany. Since 1945, Grodno has been part of Belarus. Today, it has a diverse population, including Belarusians, Poles, and a small Jewish community. The city is known for its historical architecture, including the Old Grodno Castle, and is a center for Roman Catholicism and Polish culture in Belarus.

== Other names ==
In Belarusian Classical Orthography (Taraškievica), the city is named as Горадня (Horadnia). In Latin, it was known as Grodna (-ae), in Polish as Grodno, in Lithuanian as Gardinas, in Latvian as Grodņa, in German as Garten, and in Yiddish as גראָדנע (Grodne).

== History ==
=== Early history ===
Before arrival of the East Slavs to the Grodno Region in the 10th–11th centuries, the area was inhabited by Baltic tribe Yotvingians, who were heavily Lithuanized in the 5th-7th centuries already and especially during the formation of the State of Lithuania in the 13th century, and subsequently for a long time Grodno and its area was a part of the Ethnographic Lithuania (e.g. even in the 19th century the Lithuanian-inhabited areas were still nearby the present-day suburbs of Grodno city). Linguistic findings refute the theses of Lithuanian scholars—the name of Grodno, claims Leszek Bednarczuk, 'cannot be Baltic;' the city was located beyond the Lithuanian linguistic border. The etymology of the city's name is considered to be Slavic, derived from the Ruthenian horod 'fortress'.

The modern city of Grodno originated as a small fortress and a fortified trading outpost maintained by the Rurikid princes on the border with the lands of the Baltic tribal union of the Yotvingians. The first reference to Grodno dates to 1005.

The official foundation year is 1128. In this year Grodno was mentioned in the Kievan Chronicle as Goroden, and located at a crossing of numerous trading routes. The same chronicle also reports in the year 1183: 'That same year all of Goroden burned, including all the stone churches, from a flash of lightning and a clap of thunder in a thunderstorm.'

=== Grand Duchy of Lithuania ===
Grodno became part of the Grand Duchy of Lithuania in the 13th century, and the local stronghold was rebuilt by Lithuanians. Prince Daniel of Galicia briefly captured the city in 1253 and once again attacked it in 1259. In 1276, Duke Traidenis gave shelter in Grodno to Yotvingians fleeing the Teutonic Knights' massacre. The city was unsuccessfully attacked by the Rus' princes and Tatars in 1277, then repeatedly attacked, with varying success, by the Teutonic Knights in 1283, 1296, 1306, 1311, 1312, 1328, 1361, 1363, 1373, 1375, 1377. In 1358 a convention took place in Grodno on border disputes between Lithuania and the Polish Duchy of Masovia.

Since 1385 Grodno formed part of the Polish–Lithuanian union. The famous Lithuanian Grand Duke Vytautas was the prince of Grodno from 1376 to 1392, and he stayed there during his preparations for the Battle of Grunwald (1410). During the Lithuanian Civil War of 1389–1392, the city was captured by Władysław II Jagiełło in 1390, and then by Vytautas in 1391, with Vytautas-allied Konrad von Wallenrode committing a massacre of 15 Polish prisoners-of-war. After the Ostrów Agreement of 1392, Vytautas expelled the Teutonic Knights, who in revenge captured the city, burned the castle and took 3,000 prisoners. The city was attacked one more time by the Teutonic Knights in 1402. Since 1413, Grodno had been the administrative center of a powiat in Trakai Voivodeship. Polish King Władysław II Jagiełło often stopped in Grodno, including in 1414, 1416, 1418 and 1425. In 1425, Polish-Teutonic talks concerning the borders took place there.

To aid the reconstruction of trade and commerce, the grand dukes allowed the creation of a Jewish commune in 1389. It was one of the first Jewish communities in the Grand Duchy of Lithuania. In 1441 the city received its charter, based on the Magdeburg Law. In 1445, Casimir IV Jagiellon received a delegation from Kraków in Grodno announcing his election as king of Poland.

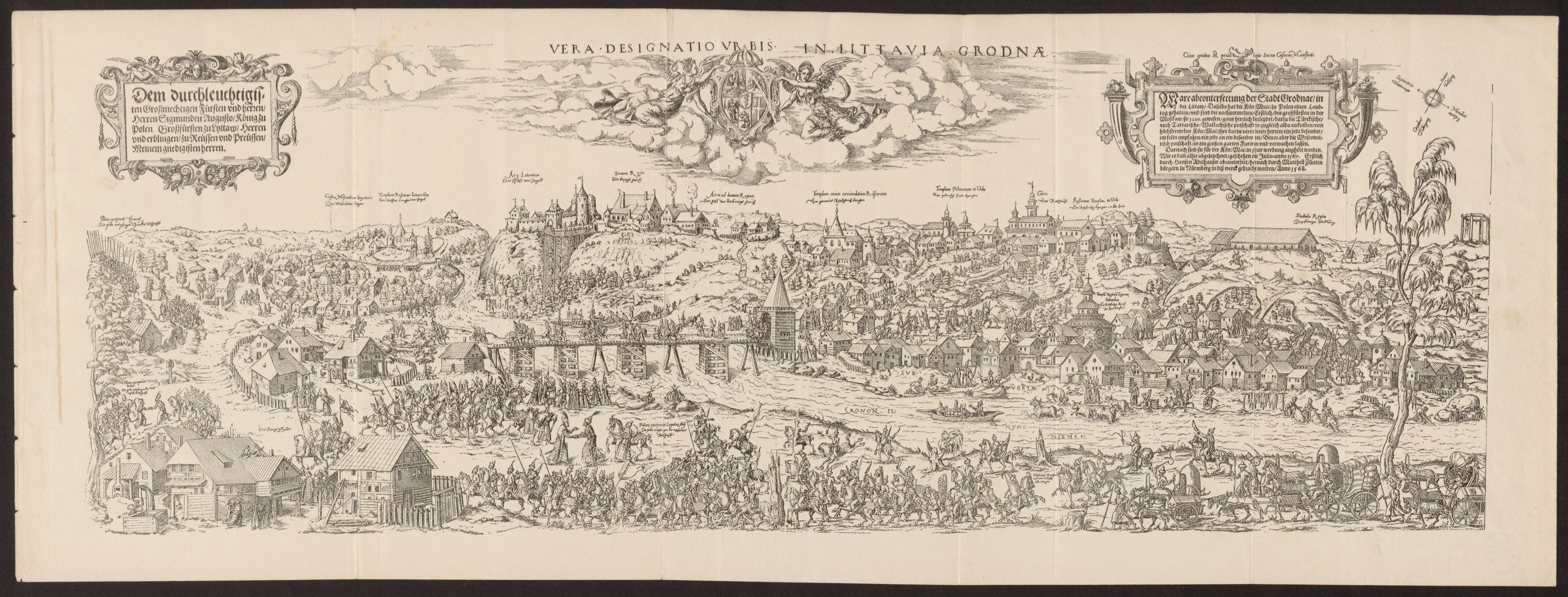
Cityscape of Grodno city in 1567

==== Polish–Lithuanian Commonwealth ====
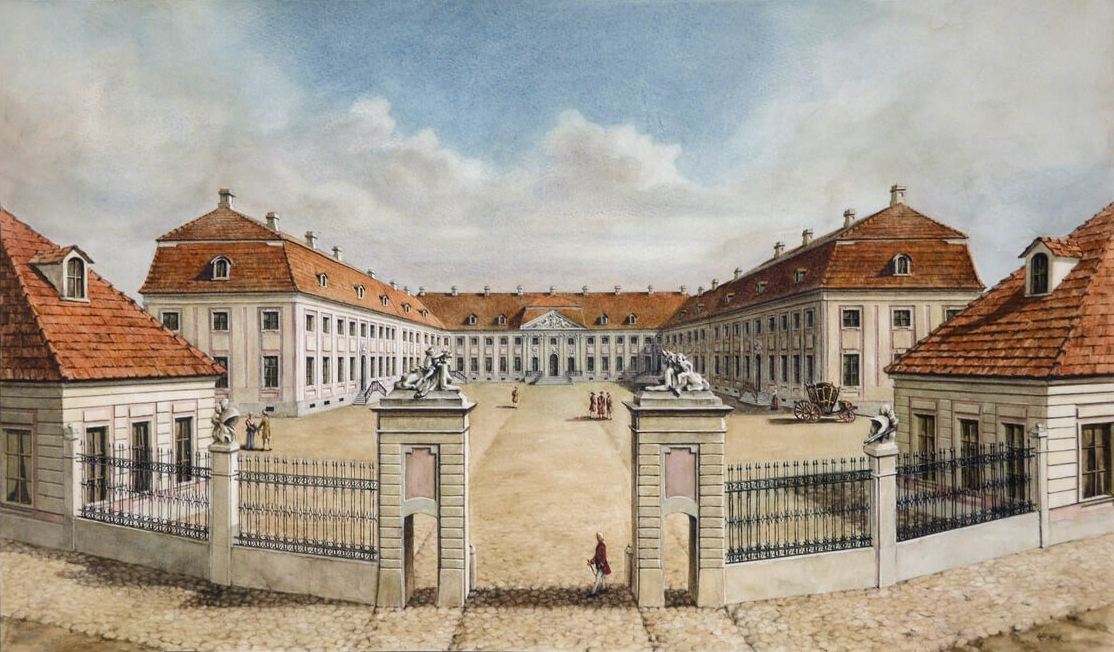
The New Castle in Grodno used to be a summer residence of Polish–Lithuanian Commonwealth monarchs

As an important centre of trade, commerce, and culture, Grodno was a notable royal city and was also one of the royal residences and political centers of the Polish–Lithuanian Commonwealth. In the 1580s, Grodno was the de facto capital of the Polish–Lithuanian Commonwealth, when King Stephen Báthory of Poland moved his main residence and military headquarters there. Stephen Báthory rebuilt the Old Grodno Castle into an important royal residence and built the Renaissance Batorówka Palace. The Old and New Castles were often visited by the Commonwealth monarchs. Kings Casimir IV Jagiellon and Stephen Báthory died there, and the latter was initially buried at the local Church of the Blessed Virgin Mary. Grodno was one of the places where the Sejms of the Polish–Lithuanian Commonwealth were held, incl. the last Sejm in the history of the Commonwealth in 1793.

The city was the site of two battles, Battle of Grodno (1706) and Battle of Grodno (1708) during the Great Northern War.

After the Second Partition of the Polish–Lithuanian Commonwealth and a subsequent administrative reform of the remainder of the Commonwealth, Grodno became the capital of the short-lived Grodno Voivodeship in 1793.

=== Late modern period ===
In 1795, Russia annexed the city in the Third Partition of Poland. It was in the New Castle on 25 November that year that the last Polish king and Lithuanian grand duke Stanisław August Poniatowski abdicated. In the Russian Empire, the city continued to serve its role as a seat of Grodno Governorate since 1801. The industrial activities started in the late 18th century by Antoni Tyzenhaus, continued to develop.

During the Napoleonic Wars and fights for Polish liberation, in 1812, Polish uhlans of Prince Józef Poniatowski entered Grodno, followed by the French led by Jérôme Bonaparte. The entry of the allied Polish and French troops was met with enthusiasm by the population, the Accession to the Confederation of the inhabitants of the Grodno district was announced, Napoleon's name day was officially celebrated and an obelisk was erected in honour of the French.

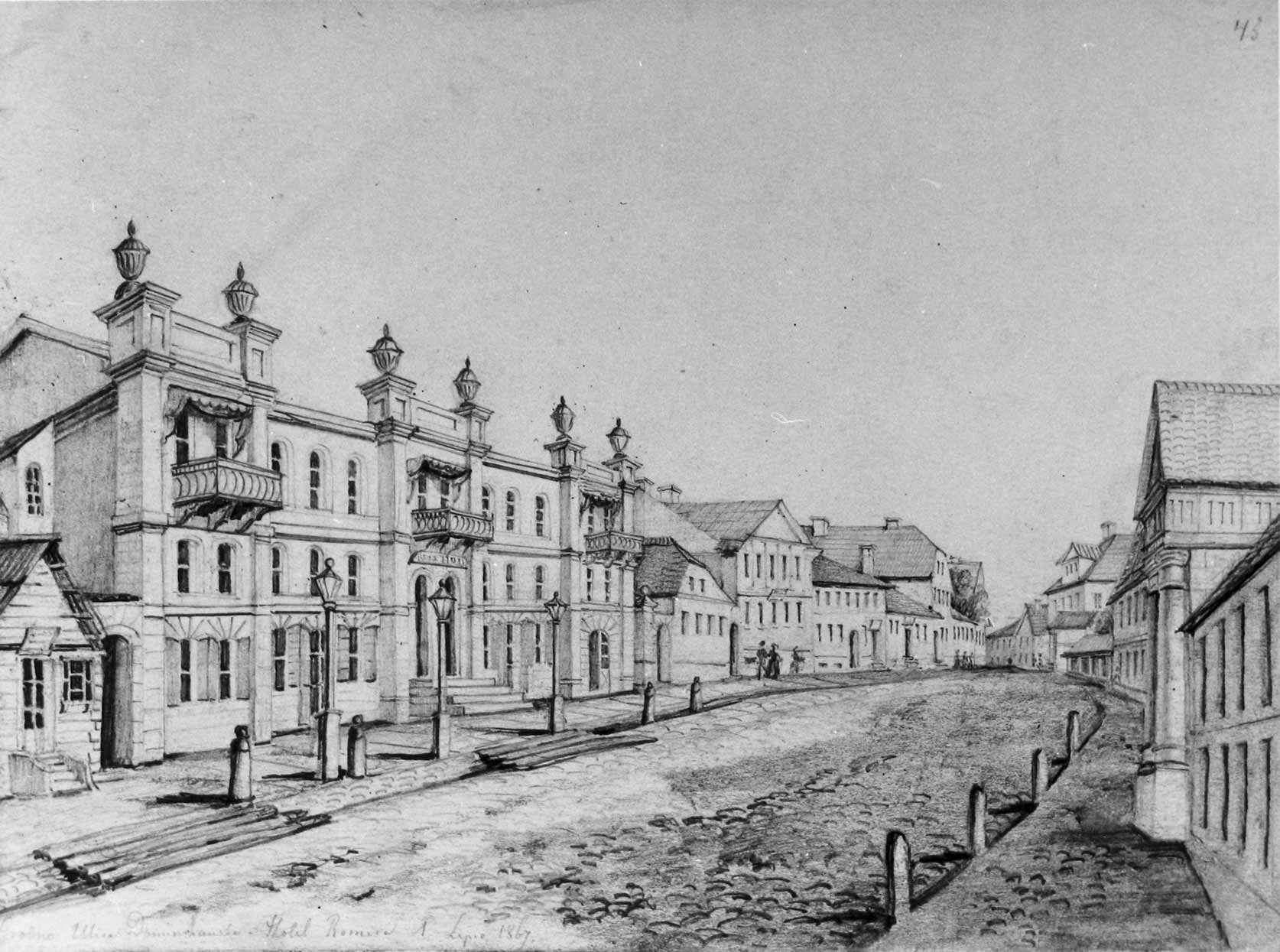
Grodno in the 1860s on a drawing by Napoleon Orda, seat of authorities of the underground Polish Grodno Voivodeship from the January Uprising on the left

In 1833, following the unsuccessful November Uprising, notable local Polish independence activist and insurgent Michał Wołłowicz was hanged by the Russians, and the local Dominican gymnasium was seized by the Tsarist authorities.

Local Poles took part in Polish national mourning after the Russian massacre of Polish protesters in Warsaw in 1861. The dean of Grodno, Józef Majewski, was deported to Tobolsk in Siberia for attempting to organise a procession to Różanystok, a regional Catholic pilgrimage destination. Count Aleksander Bisping was arrested and imprisoned here during the January Uprising (1863-1864) before his exile to Ufa. After the fall of the uprising, a ban on the use of Polish in public places was introduced in 1865, and martial law was in force in Grodno until 1871.

As a result of Russian discriminatory policies (see Pale of Settlement) the city experienced an influx of Jewish immigrants in the 19th century, and thus had a significant Jewish population before the Holocaust: according to the Russian census of 1897, out of the total population of 46,900, Jews constituted 22,700 (around 48%, or almost half of the total population).

=== World War I and interwar period ===
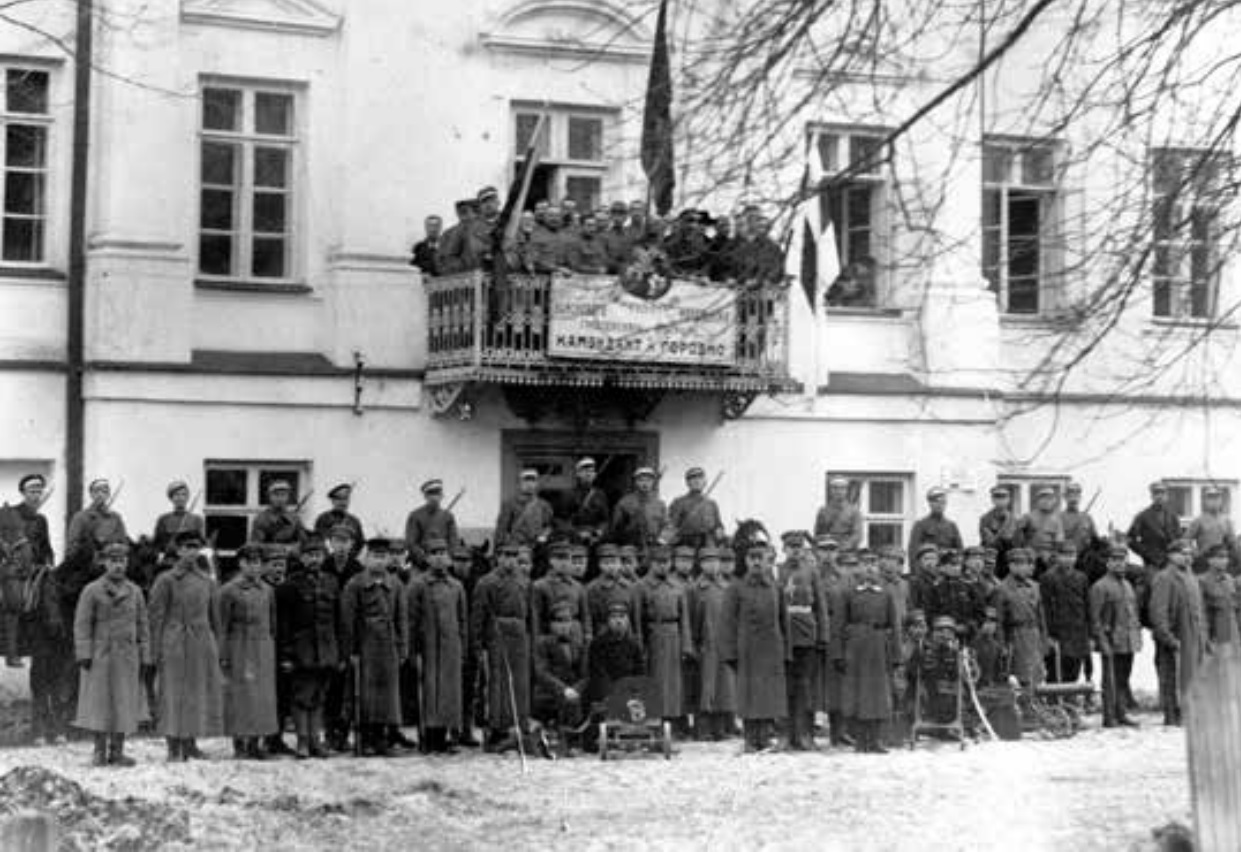
Grodno Military Command, which is decorated with three flags of Lithuania, Belarus, and with the Coat of arms of Lithuania in January 1919

After the outbreak of World War I, Grodno was occupied by Germany (3 September 1915) and ceded by Bolshevist Russia under the Treaty of Brest-Litovsk in 1918. After the war the German government permitted a short-lived state to be set up there, the first one with a Belarusian name—the Belarusian People's Republic. This declared its independence from Russia in March 1918 in Minsk (known at that time as Mensk), but then the Rada of the Belarusian Democratic Republic had to leave Minsk and fled to Grodno and later to the temporary Lithuanian capital Kaunas. All this time the military authority in the city remained in German hands until April 1919. Nevertheless, military units of the Lithuanian Armed Forces were formed in the German-controlled part of the Grodno Region in 1918–1919. For example, a Belarusian unit named 1st Belarusian Regiment, commanded by Alaksandar Ružancoŭ, was formed mainly from Grodno's inhabitants in 1919 as a part of the Lithuanian Armed Forces and participated in Lithuania's side during the Lithuanian Wars of Independence, thus large amount of its members were awarded with the highest state award of Lithuania – Order of the Cross of Vytis. In accordance with an agreement between Lithuania and Belarus (Rada BNR), the Grodno Region was joined to Lithuania. According to Lithuanian president Antanas Smetona, the Lithuanians considered granting an autonomy to the Belarusian territories within Lithuania (as requested by Belarusian side; there were Belarusian members in the Council of Lithuania and representation in the Government of Lithuania by Lithuanian Ministry for Belarusian Affairs).

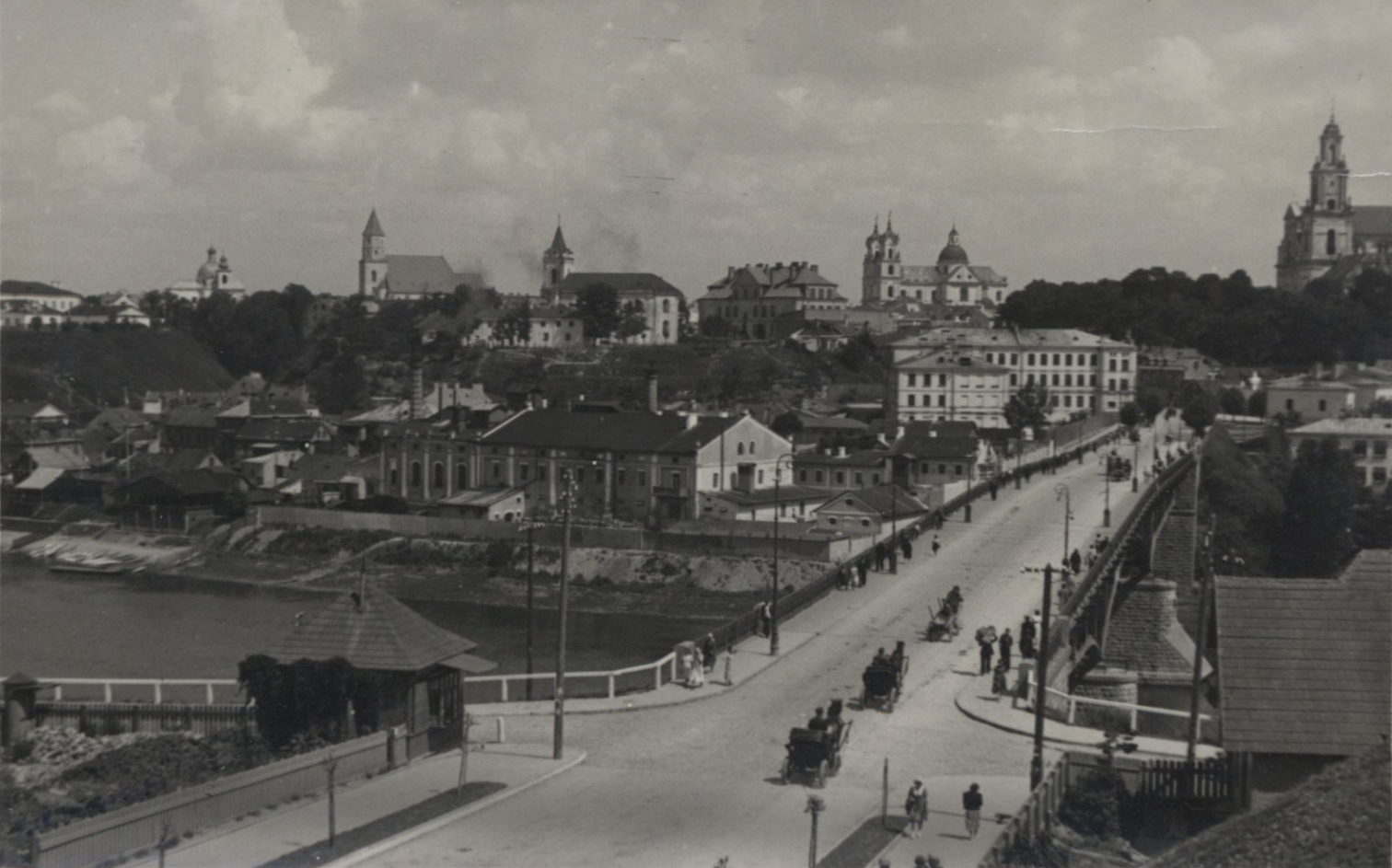
Grodno skyline in 1934

After the outbreak of the Polish–Bolshevik War, the German commanders of the Ober Ost feared that the city might fall to Soviet Russia, so according to the 1919 Treaty of Białystok on 27 April 1919 they passed authority to Poland, which just regained independence several months earlier. The city was taken over by the Polish Army the following day and Polish administration was established in the city. The Poles disbanded the Lithuania's 1st Belarusian Regiment (which refused to carry out Polish orders) in Grodno and publicly humiliated, looted and repressed soldiers of this unit, including officers, as well as Lithuanian and Belarusian symbols and flags in the city were torn down and publicly ridiculed, and were replaced with Polish equivalents. The city was lost by Poles to the Red Army on 20 July 1920 in what became known as the First Battle of Grodno. The city was also claimed by Lithuanian government, after it was agreed by the Soviet–Lithuanian Treaty of 1920 signed on 12 July 1920 in Moscow that the city would be transferred to Lithuania. However, Soviet defeat in the Battle of Warsaw made these plans obsolete, and Lithuanian authority was never established in the city. Instead, the Red Army organised its last stand in the city and the Battle of Neman took place there. On 23 September the Polish Army recaptured the city. After the Peace Treaty of Riga, Grodno remained in Poland.

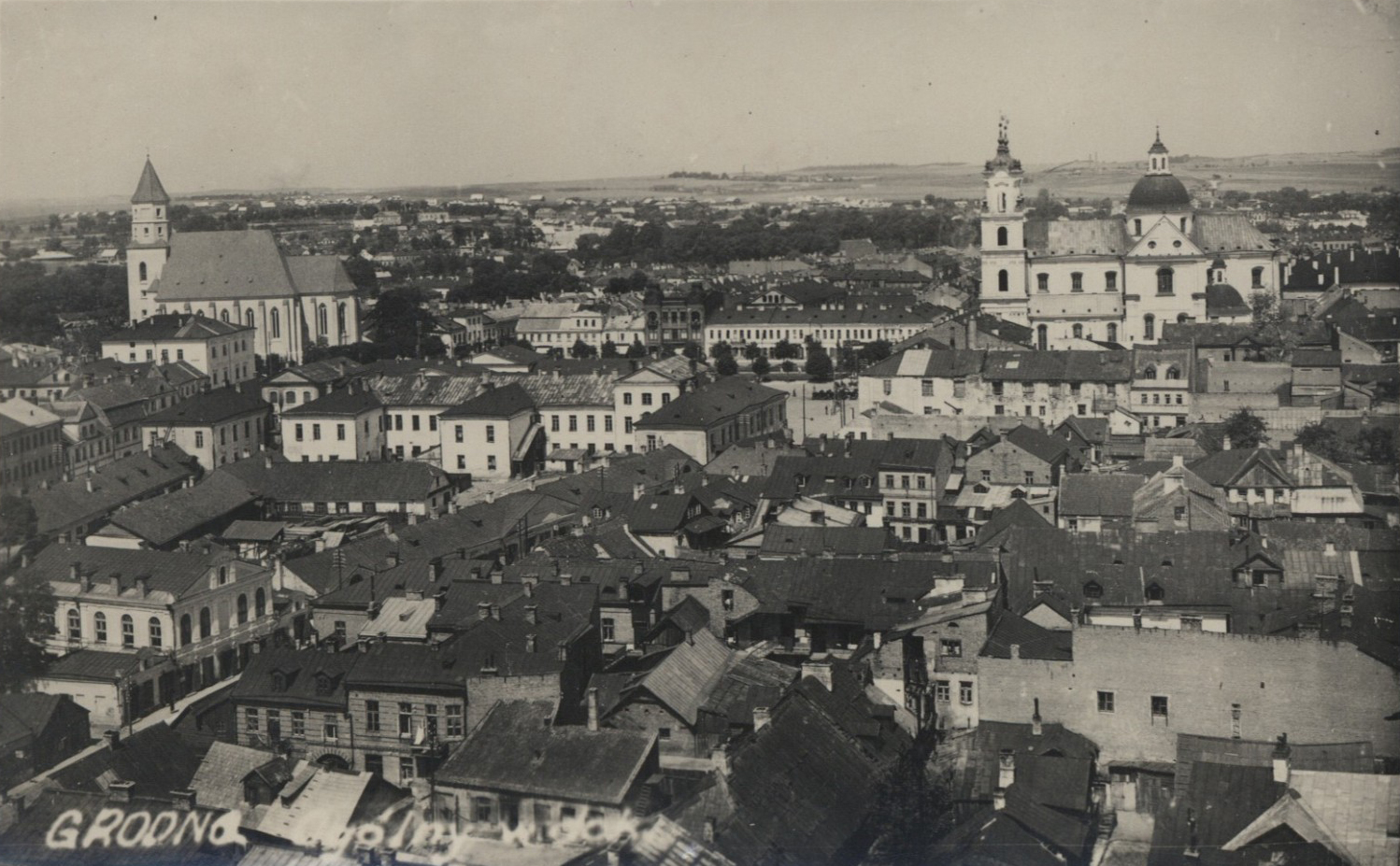
View of Grodno in 1935

Initially, prosperity was reduced due to the fact that the city remained only the capital of a powiat, while the capital of the voivodeship was moved to Białystok. However, in the late 1920s the city became one of the biggest Polish Army garrisons. This brought the local economy back on track. According to the 1921 Polish census, the population of the city was 49.9% Polish, 43.4% Jewish, 4.3% Belarusian, 2.0% Russian, 0.26% German and 0.05% Lithuanian.

=== World War II ===
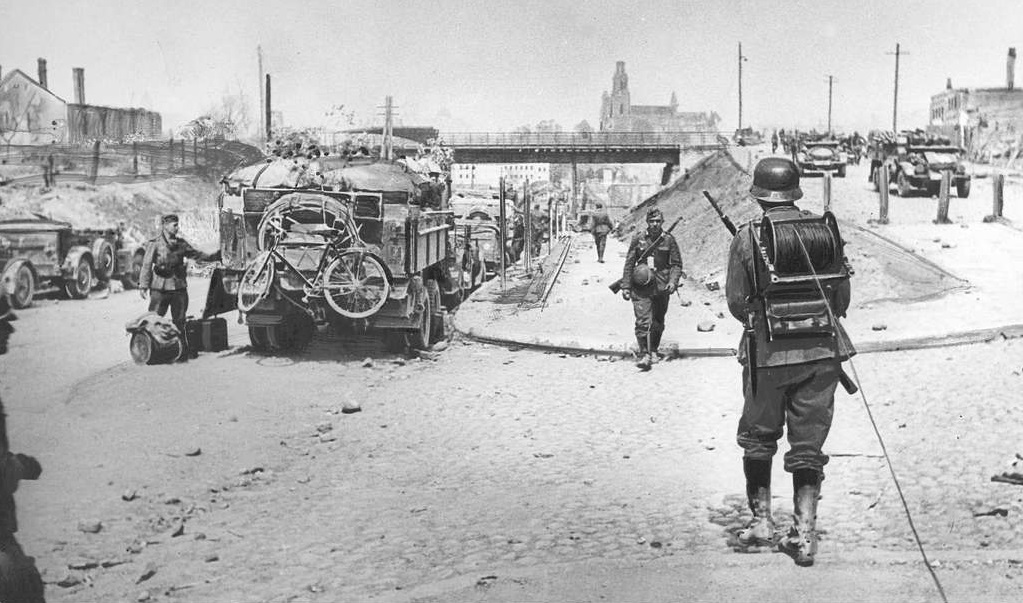
German Army in Grodno during World War II in 1941

During the Polish Defensive War of September to October 1939 the garrison of Grodno was mostly used for the formation of numerous military units fighting against the invading Wehrmacht. In the course of the Soviet invasion of Poland (initiated on 17 September 1939) heavy fighting took place in the city between Soviet and improvised Polish forces, composed mostly of march battalions and volunteers. In the course of the Battle of Grodno (20-22 September) the Red Army lost some hundred men (according to Polish sources; according to Soviet sources – 57 killed and 159 wounded) and also 19 tanks and 4 APCs destroyed or damaged. The Polish side suffered at least 100 killed in action, military and civil, but losses still remain uncertain in detail (Soviet sources claim 644 killed and 1543 captives with many guns and machine guns etc. captured). Over 300 captured Polish defenders of the city, including Polish Army officers and youth, were massacred afterwards by the Soviets. After the Soviet forces surrounded the engaged Polish units, the escaping Polish units withdrew to Lithuania.

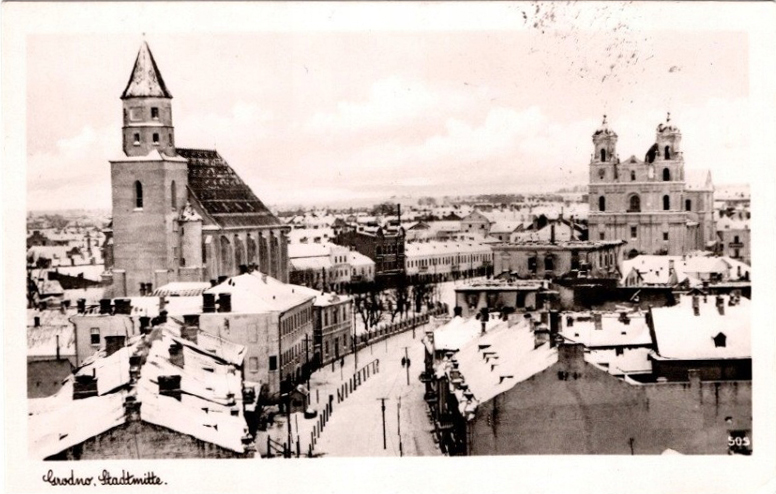
Grodno skyline with the Church of the Blessed Virgin Mary (left) and Grodno Cathedral (right) in 1941-1944

In accordance with the Molotov–Ribbentrop Pact of August 1939, the city was occupied by the Soviet Union and annexed into the Byelorussian Soviet Socialist Republic. Several thousand of the city's Polish inhabitants were deported to remote areas of the Soviet Union. On 1–2 October 1940, negotiations were held in Grodno between the Lithuanian and Belarusian communists to resolve territorial disputes between the Lithuanian SSR and Byelorussian SSR. The Lithuanians received less territories than they were appointed by the Supreme Soviet Decree of 3 August 1940 and on 6 November 1940 the Supreme Soviet of the Soviet Union adopted a new decree regarding the borders of the Byelorussian SSR and Lithuanian SSR. The Byelorussian SSR transferred cities and surroundings of Švenčionys, Dieveniškės, Druskininkai to the Lithuanian SSR that were mostly inhabited by Lithuanians and the Lithuanians began administrating them in January 1941. According to a 26 September 1940 meeting protocol of the Central Committee of the Communist Party of Byelorussia, Panteleimon Ponomarenko, the First Secretary of the Communist Party of Byelorussia, narrated during the meeting that previously he discussed with the Soviet dictator Joseph Stalin the issue of the territorial transfers between the Byelorussian SSR and the Lithuanian SSR and Stalin said to him that if he will not transfer territories where there are many Lithuanians he will be punished.

On 23 June 1941, the city came under German occupation that lasted until 16 July 1944. It was administered as part of the Bialystok District. Surviving inmates of the Grodno prison were released and the scale of the NKVD prisoner massacres revealed. In the course of Operation Barbarossa in World War II, the majority of Jews were herded by the Nazis into the Grodno Ghetto and subsequently killed in extermination camps. The Germans also operated a Nazi prison in the city.

=== Byelorussian SSR and Republic of Belarus ===
Since 1945, the city has been a centre of one of the provinces of the Byelorussian SSR, now of the independent Republic of Belarus. Most of the Polish inhabitants were expelled or fled to Poland in 1944–1946 and 1955–1959. However, in 2019 Poles were still the second-most numerous nationality in the city (22%), after Belarusians.

Historical population
Year	Pop.	±%
1897	46,919	—
1921	34,694	−26.1%
1939	49,200	+41.8%
1959	72,943	+48.3%
1970	132,471	+81.6%
1979	194,775	+47.0%
1989	270,535	+38.9%
1999	301,600	+11.5%
2009	327,540	+8.6%
2019	355,932	+8.7%
2024	361,115	+1.5%

The Grodno Old Town was severely damaged during World War II and post-war authorities lacked will to preserve its heritage. The Church of the Blessed Virgin Mary, which because of its founder (14th century) was commonly referred to as Vytautas' Church, was first turned into a warehouse and eventually in 1961 was blown up by a decision of the Grodno Executive Committee. The Grodno Town Hall (constructed in 1513) was demolished to expand Savieckaja Square. The early 17th century Baroque style Church of the Nativity of the Blessed Virgin Mary and Bernardine Monastery was demolished in 1951 also by a decision of the Grodno Executive Committee and the Grodno Regional Drama Theatre was built in its place.

In 2005, the reconstruction of the historical centre of Grodno began. In 2008, the Belarusian Voluntary Society for the Protection of Historical and Cultural Monuments declared violations of the Law on the Protection of Historical and Cultural Heritage: the destruction of the cultural layer in the historic Old Market Square, demolition of 28 Constructivist architecture buildings in Mickevich, Gorky and 17 September streets in order to replace them with a modern hotel complex and the main traffic flow is directed in dangerous proximity to the New and Old Castles, while the plans to rebuild the Grodno Town Hall and the Church of the Blessed Virgin Mary (Vytautas' Church) are not being implemented.

The reconstruction of the Old Grodno Castle was started in 2017 and also received criticism due to the lacking of historical authenticity. For instance, the contemporary viewpoint was added near the central gates. Some specialists disputed the restoration project, they found significant mistakes in documentation that appeared because the constructor could not read historical inventory descriptions written in Polish and German. For example, the shape of the dome above the central tower, added levels between towers and galleries. Some authentic 16th century walls were demolished.

Despite its significant loss of heritage, the city still has the largest ensemble of historical buildings in Belarus. Known as the "royal city" and "a grand-ducal-royal city", it is a popular tourist destination. In 2022, the Brest-Grodno area was declared a visa-free zone for foreign visitors staying up to 15 days. Nevertheless, the British, American, Lithuanian, Canadian authorities as well as representatives of the Belarusian opposition urged against travel to Belarus because of safety concerns relating to the risk of arbitrary enforcement of local laws (resulting in arrests and detention) and the Russo-Ukrainian War.

=== Jewish community ===
Jews began to settle in Grodno in the 14th century after the approval given to them by the Lithuanian Grand Duke Vytautas. The YIVO Encyclopedia of Jews in Eastern Europe describes the community's privilege, said to have been granted by Vytautas in 1389, as a forgery dating from the early 16th century. During the next years, their status had changed several times and in 1495 the Jews were deported from the city and banned from settling in Grodno (the ban was lifted in 1503). In 1560 there were 60 Jewish families in Grodno. They were concentrated on the "Jewish street" with their own synagogue and "hospital". In the year 1578 the great synagogue of Grodno was built by rabbi Mordehai Yaffe (Baal ha-Levush). The synagogue was severely damaged in a fire in 1599.

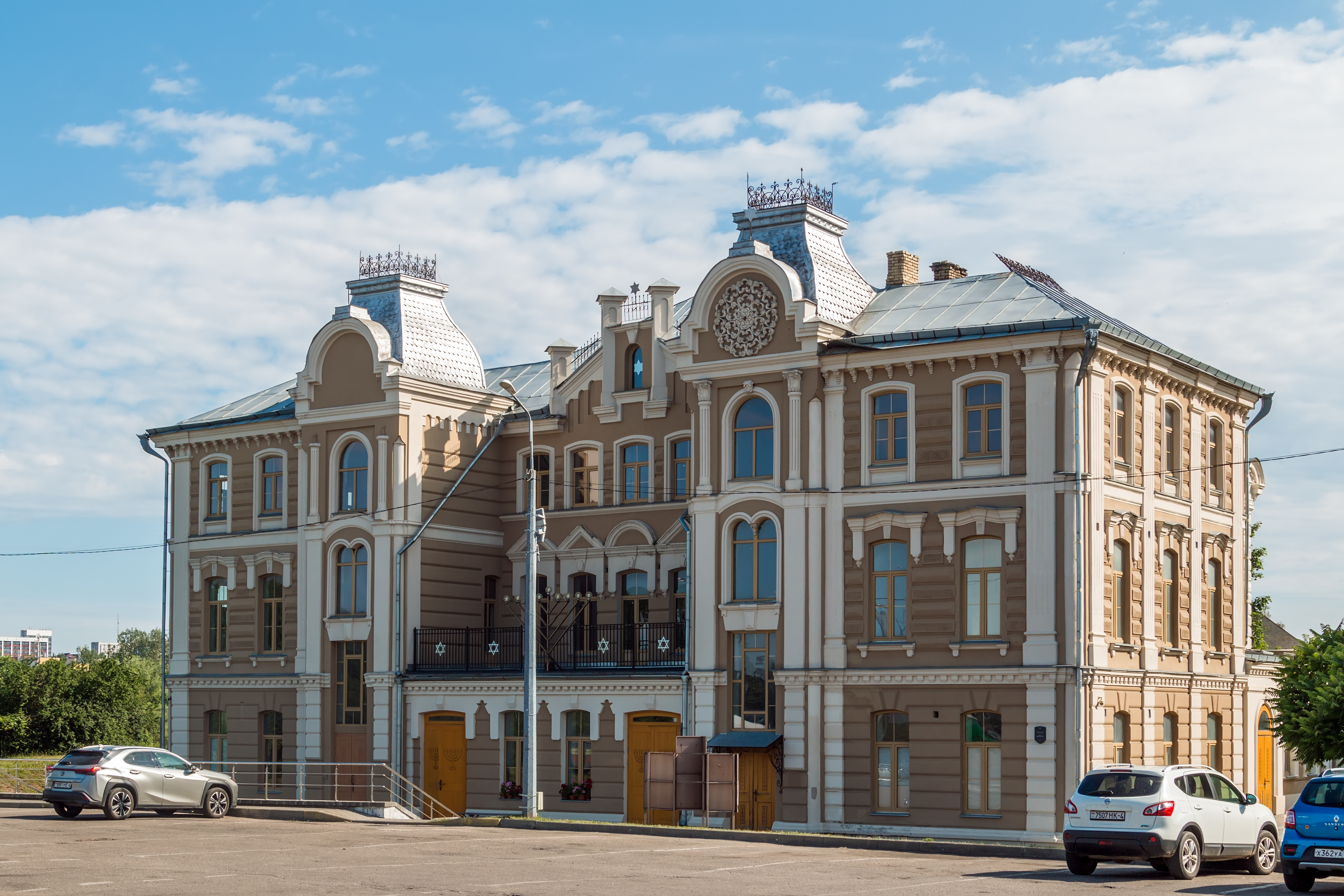
Great Synagogue

The community was not affected by the Khmelnytsky uprising but suffered during the 1655 Cossack uprising and during the war with Sweden (1703–1708). After Grodno was annexed by the Russian Empire in 1795 it was made part of the Pale of Settlement within which Jewish residency was allowed, and beyond which it was prohibited. Thus the Jewish population continued to grow and in 1907 there were 25,000 Jews out of a total population of 47,000.

In the period of independent Poland, a yeshiva had operated in the city (Shaar ha-Tora) under the management of Rabbi Shimon Shkop. Before the German-Soviet invasion of Poland there were about 25,000 Jews in Grodno out of 50,000 total population. During the German occupation of the city, on 1 November 1942 the Jews were concentrated in 2 ghettos. 15,000 men were confined to the old part of the city where the main synagogue was located. A high wall of 2 meters was built around the ghetto. The second ghetto was located in the Slovodka part of the city with 10,000 inhabitants. The head of the Judenrat was appointed Dr. Braur (or Brawer), the school's headmaster, who served in this duty until his execution in February 1943 during a roundup for a deportation to Treblinka. Several local Jews were rescued by Poles who either hidden them in the city or transported them to other locations.

On 2 November 1942 the deportations to the death camps began and during 5 days in February 1943, 10,000 Jews were sent to Auschwitz. Later, on 13 February, 5,000 Jews were sent to Treblinka. During the deportations, many synagogues were looted and some people were murdered. The last Jews were deported in March 1943. By the end of the war, only one Jew had remained in the ghetto. However, a few hundred survived in the camps or in hiding in the area. Perhaps as many as 2000 survived, including those who fled or were deported to the USSR.

After the war, the Jewish community was revived. Most of the Jews emigrated after the collapse of the Soviet Union. Today there are several hundred Jews in the city with most of the community's activity centralized in the main synagogue that had been returned to the community by the authorities in the 1990s. The head of the community is Rabbi Yitzhak Kaufman.

A memorial plaque, commemorating the 25,000 Jews who were murdered in the two ghettos in the city of Grodno was placed on a building in Zamkavaja vulica, where the entrance to the ghetto once was.

== Geography ==
The following rivers flow through the city: the Neman River, the Lasosna River and the Haradničanka River with its branch the Yurysdyka River.

=== Climate ===
The Köppen Climate Classification subtype for this climate is "Dfb" (Warm Summer Continental Climate).

Climate data for Grodno (1991–2020, extremes 1839–present)
Month	Jan	Feb	Mar	Apr	May	Jun	Jul	Aug	Sep	Oct	Nov	Dec	Year
Record high °C (°F)	15.2 (59.4)	15.0 (59.0)	24.7 (76.5)	29.2 (84.6)	32.0 (89.6)	35.1 (95.2)	35.7 (96.3)	36.2 (97.2)	34.2 (93.6)	25.2 (77.4)	17.2 (63.0)	12.7 (54.9)	36.2 (97.2)
Mean daily maximum °C (°F)	−1.0 (30.2)	0.3 (32.5)	5.3 (41.5)	13.2 (55.8)	18.9 (66.0)	22.1 (71.8)	24.2 (75.6)	23.9 (75.0)	18.1 (64.6)	11.1 (52.0)	4.7 (40.5)	0.5 (32.9)	11.8 (53.2)
Daily mean °C (°F)	−3.2 (26.2)	−2.4 (27.7)	1.4 (34.5)	7.9 (46.2)	13.2 (55.8)	16.6 (61.9)	18.7 (65.7)	18.1 (64.6)	13.0 (55.4)	7.3 (45.1)	2.5 (36.5)	−1.5 (29.3)	7.6 (45.7)
Mean daily minimum °C (°F)	−5.3 (22.5)	−4.8 (23.4)	−1.8 (28.8)	3.1 (37.6)	7.8 (46.0)	11.3 (52.3)	13.4 (56.1)	12.9 (55.2)	8.7 (47.7)	4.1 (39.4)	0.5 (32.9)	−3.5 (25.7)	3.9 (39.0)
Record low °C (°F)	−33.7 (−28.7)	−36.3 (−33.3)	−26.9 (−16.4)	−9.3 (15.3)	−6.0 (21.2)	−0.7 (30.7)	3.0 (37.4)	−1.4 (29.5)	−4.3 (24.3)	−13.5 (7.7)	−19.8 (−3.6)	−31.6 (−24.9)	−36.3 (−33.3)
Average precipitation mm (inches)	32.6 (1.28)	30.1 (1.19)	30.7 (1.21)	34.6 (1.36)	54.0 (2.13)	59.8 (2.35)	81.5 (3.21)	57.1 (2.25)	48.2 (1.90)	41.9 (1.65)	38.6 (1.52)	37.5 (1.48)	546.6 (21.53)
Average rainy days	10	7	10	12	15	15	15	13	14	14	13	11	149
Average snowy days	16	17	11	3	0.1	0	0	0	0.03	1	8	15	71
Average relative humidity (%)	87	85	80	72	71	74	74	74	81	85	89	89	80
Mean monthly sunshine hours	39	59	140	177	235	261	262	240	174	94	38	29	1,748
Percentage possible sunshine	16	22	38	42	48	52	51	52	46	29	15	13	39
Source 1: Pogoda.ru.net
Source 2: Belarus Department of Hydrometeorology (sun data from 1948–1949 and 1951–1984)

== Religion, education and culture ==
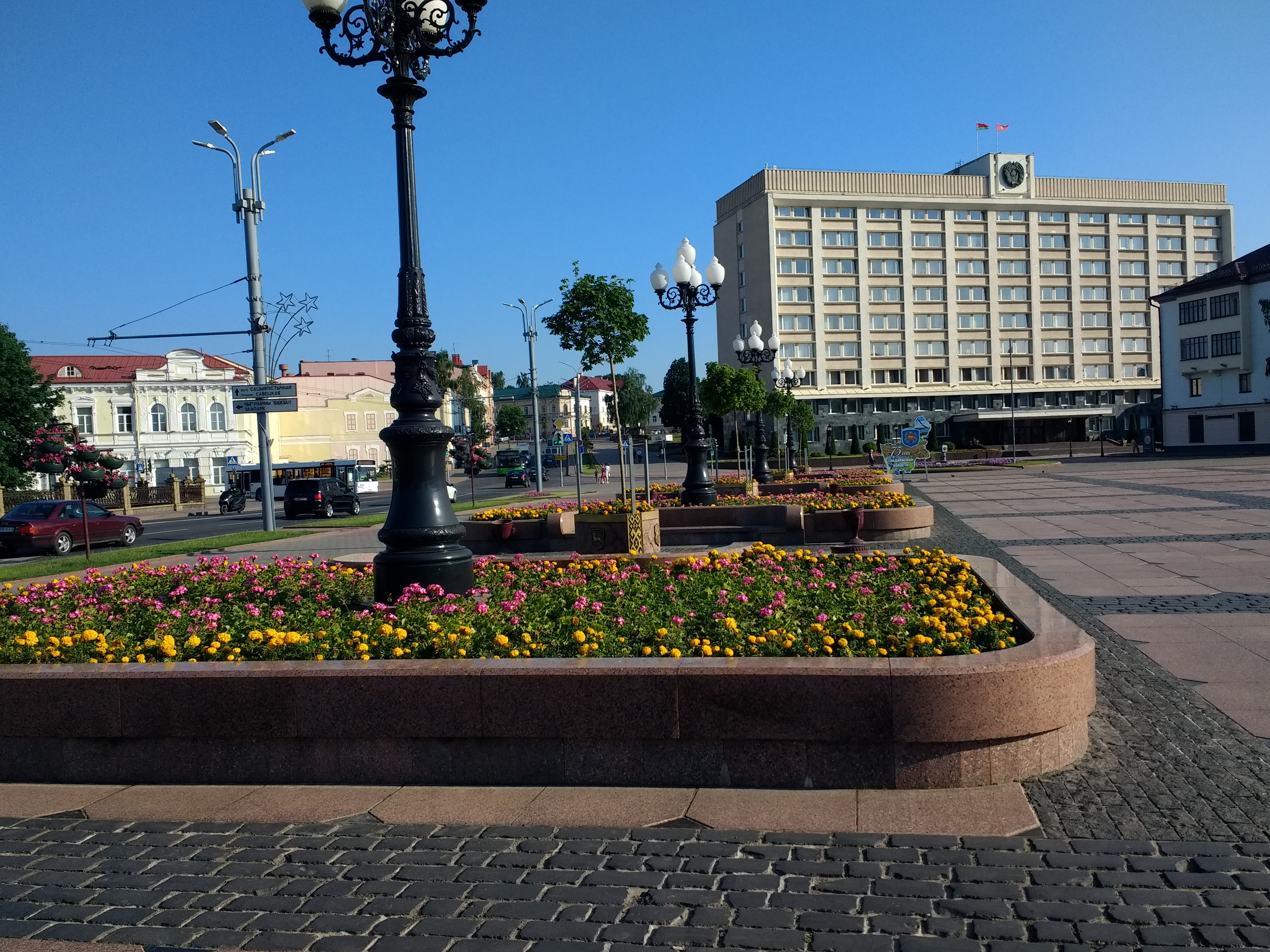
Lenin Square

The city has one of the largest concentrations of Roman Catholics in Belarus. It is also a centre of Polish culture, with a significant number of Poles living in Belarus residing in the city and its surroundings.

The Eastern Orthodox population is also widely present. The city's Catholic and Orthodox churches are important architectural treasures.

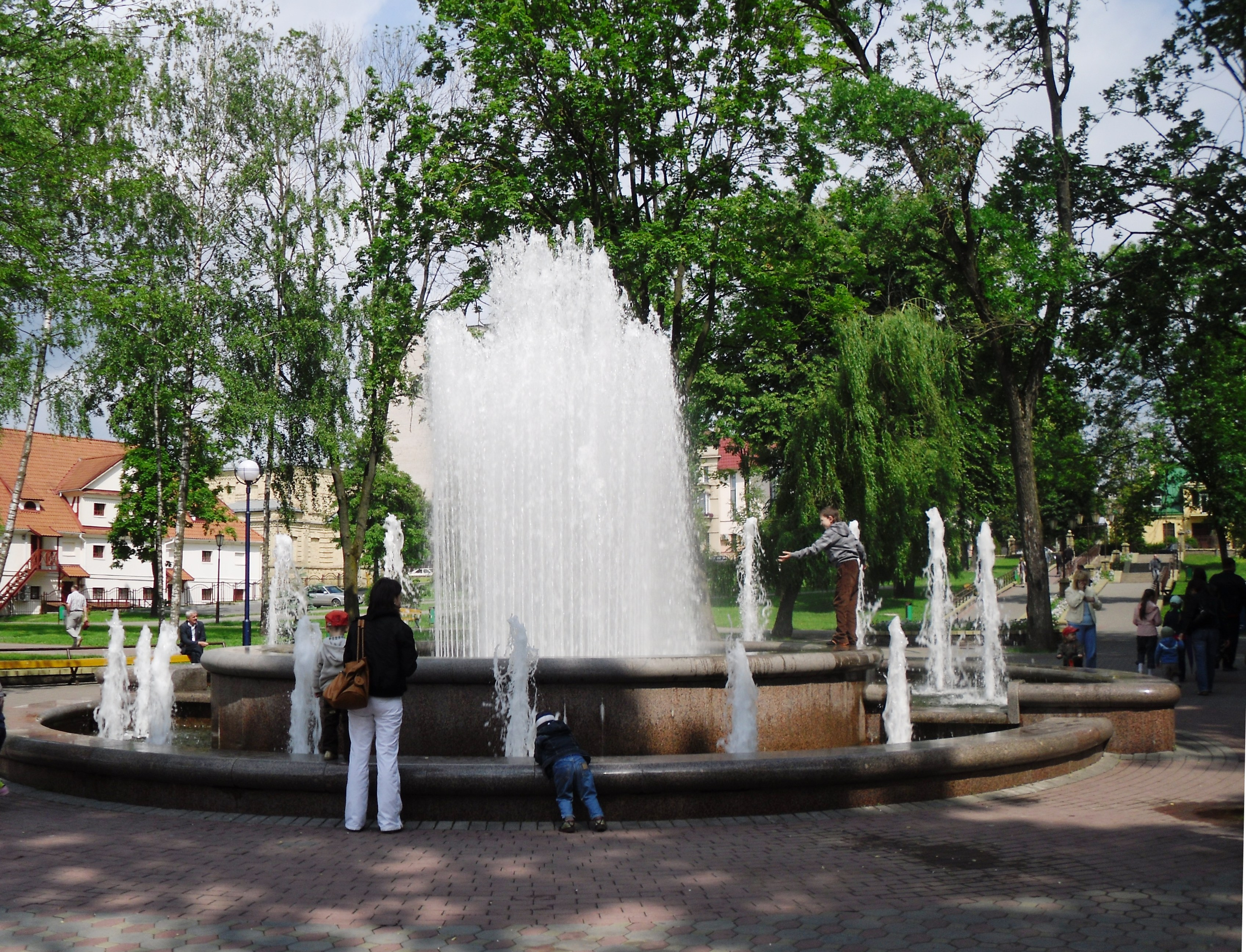
Fountain in Central Park

The city houses the Grodno State Medical University where many students from different parts of Belarus acquire academic degrees, as do a number of foreign students. Other higher educational establishments are Yanka Kupala State University of Grodno (the largest education centre in Grodno Province) and Grodno State Agrarian University. To support the Polish community, a Polish school was built in 1995, where all subjects are taught in Polish and students are able to pass exams to get accepted into Polish universities.

== Architecture ==
The town was planned to be dominated by the Old Grodno Castle, first built in stone by Grand Duke Vytautas and thoroughly rebuilt in the Renaissance style by Scotto from Parma at the behest of Stefan Batory, who made the castle his principal residence. Batory died at this palace seven years later (December 1586) and originally was interred in Grodno. (His autopsy there was the first to take place in Eastern Europe.) After his death, the castle was altered on numerous occasions, although a 17th-century stone arch bridge linking it with the city still survives. The Wettin monarchs of Poland were dissatisfied with the old residence and commissioned Matthäus Daniel Pöppelmann to design the New Grodno Castle, whose once sumptuous Baroque interiors were destroyed during World War II.

=== Medieval ===
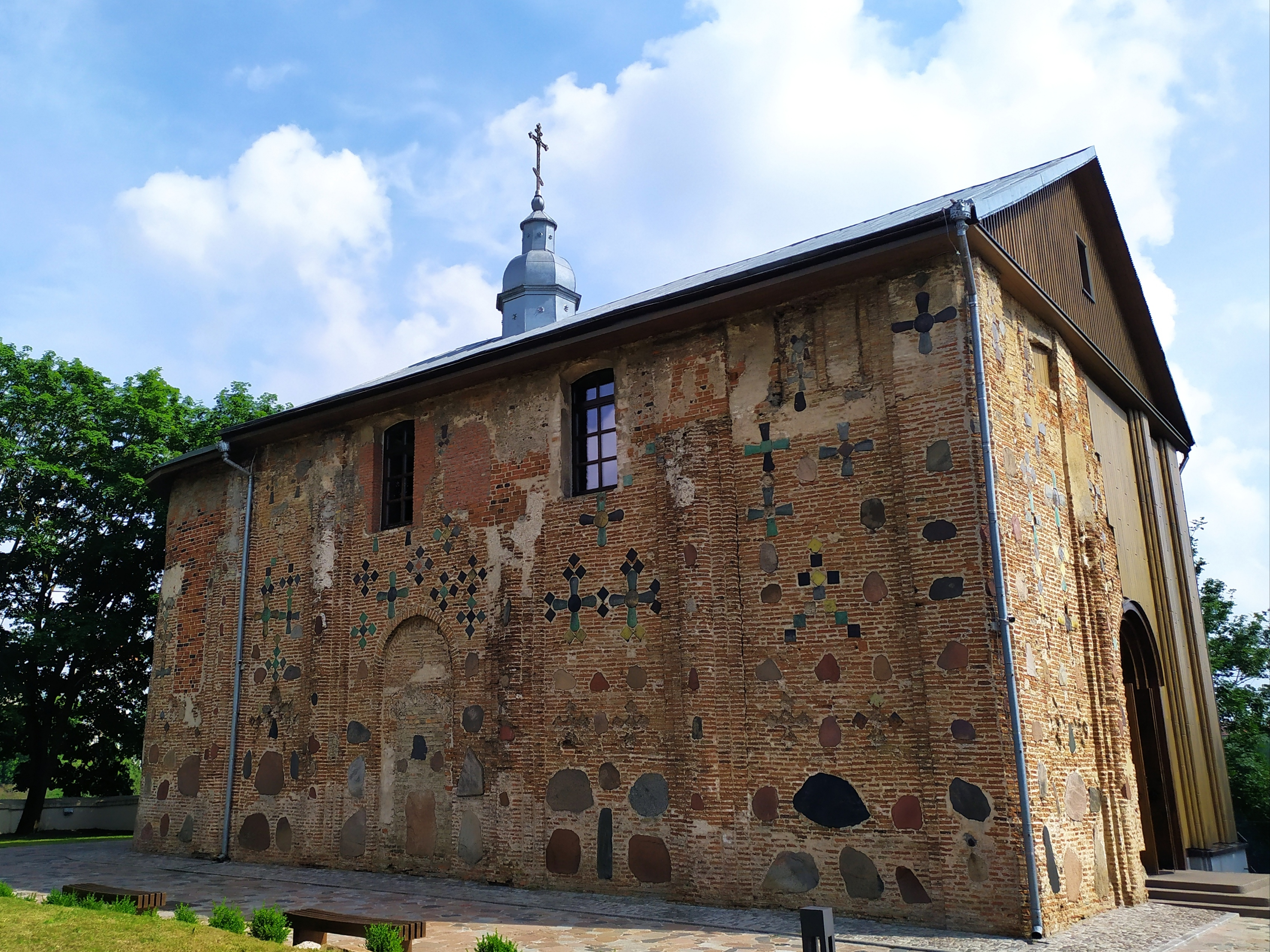
Kalozha, an Orthodox church of Sts. Boris and Gleb, 12th century

The oldest extant structure in Grodno is the Kalozha Church of Sts. Boris and Gleb (Belarusian: Каложская царква). It is the only surviving monument of ancient Black Ruthenian architecture, distinguished from other Orthodox churches by prolific use of polychrome faceted stones of blue, green or red tint which could be arranged to form crosses or other figures on the wall.

The church was built before 1183 and survived intact until 1853, when the south wall collapsed, due to its perilous location on the high bank of the Neman. During restoration works, some fragments of 12th-century frescos were discovered in the apses. Remains of four other churches in the same style, decorated with pitchers and coloured stones instead of frescos, were discovered in Grodno and Vaŭkavysk. They all date back to the turn of the 13th century, as do remains of the first stone palace in the Old Castle.

=== Baroque ===
Baroque landmarks of Grodno

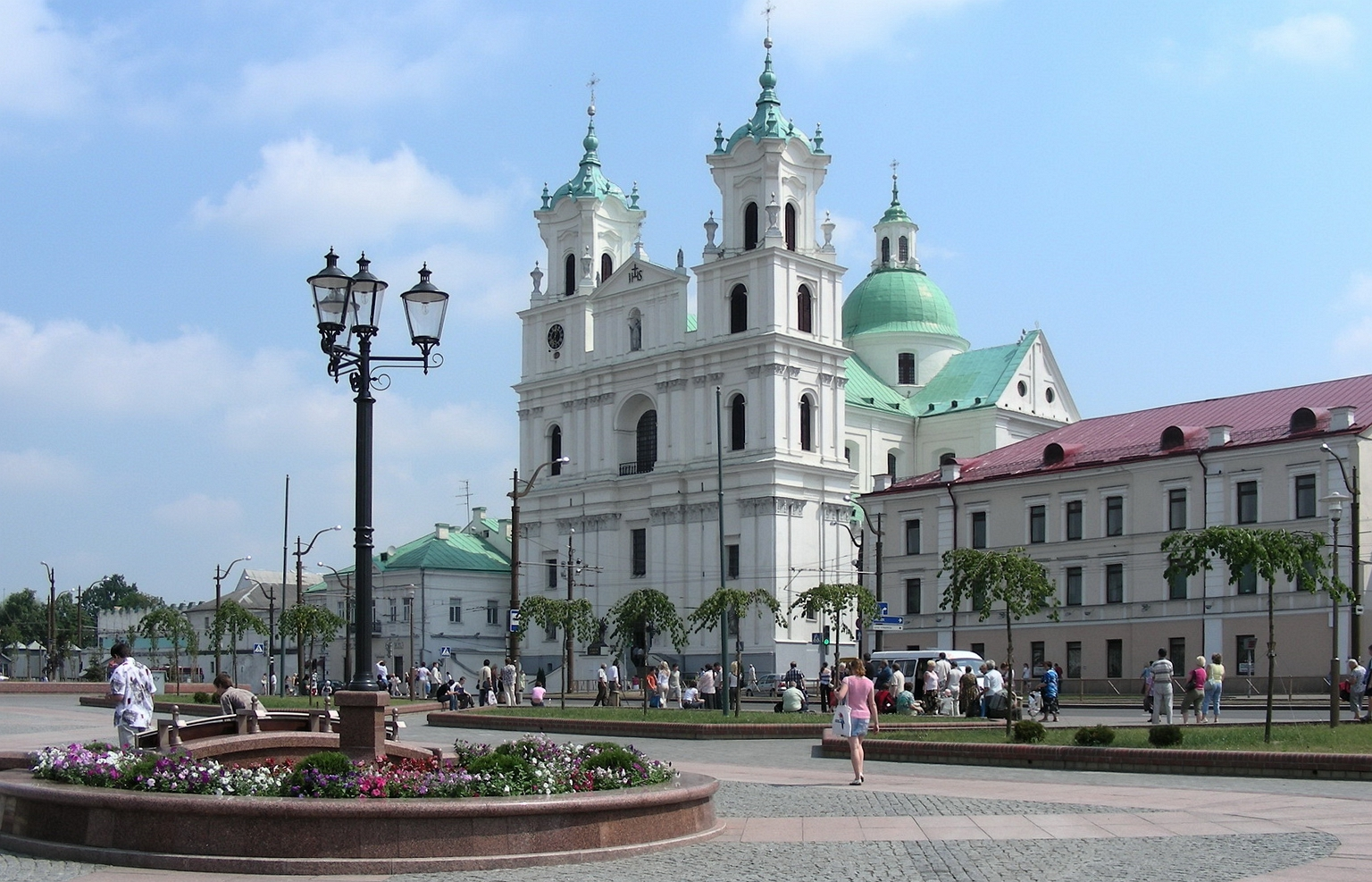
St. Francis Xavier Cathedral (1678–1705)

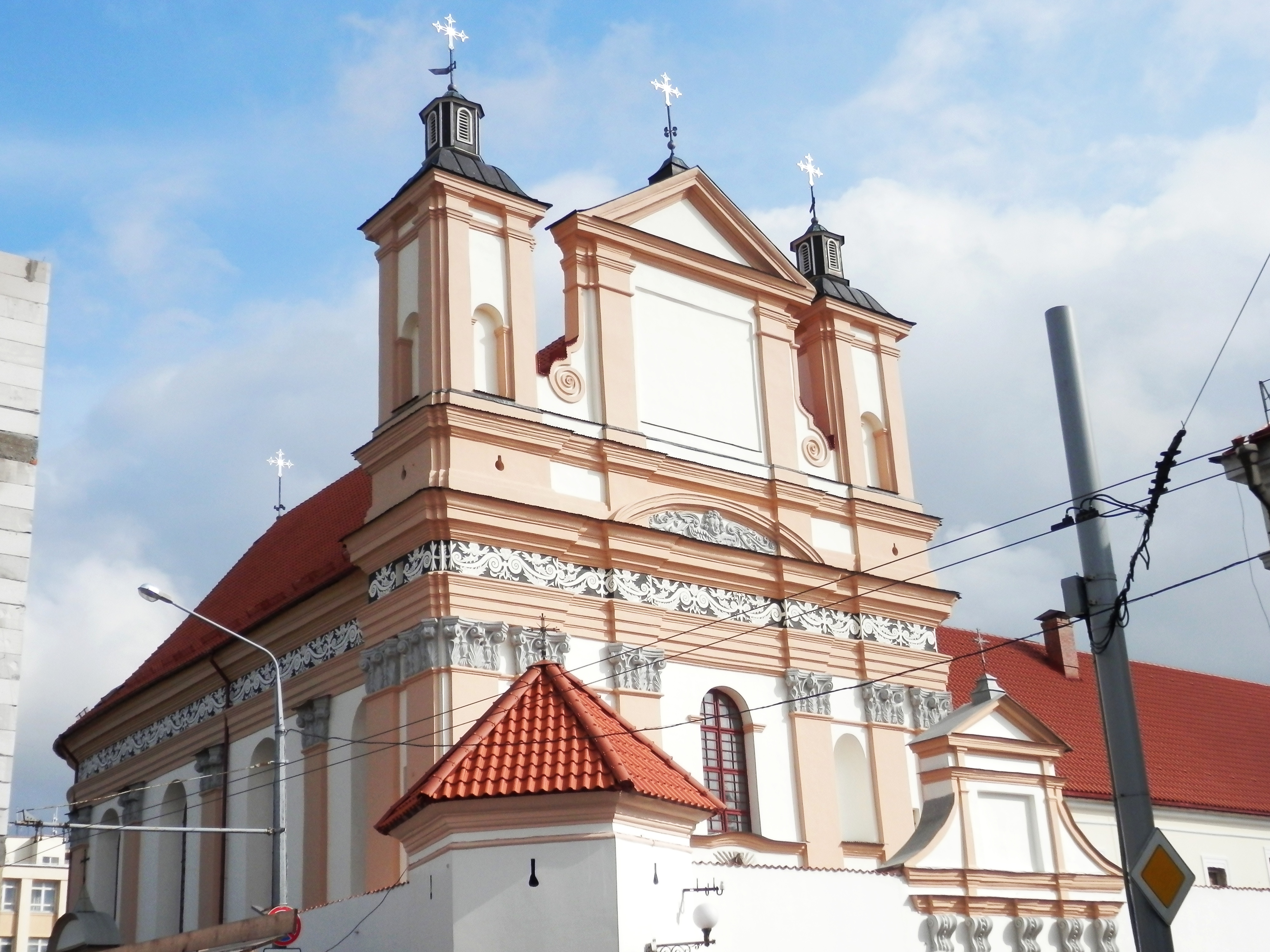
Bridgettine convent (1642)

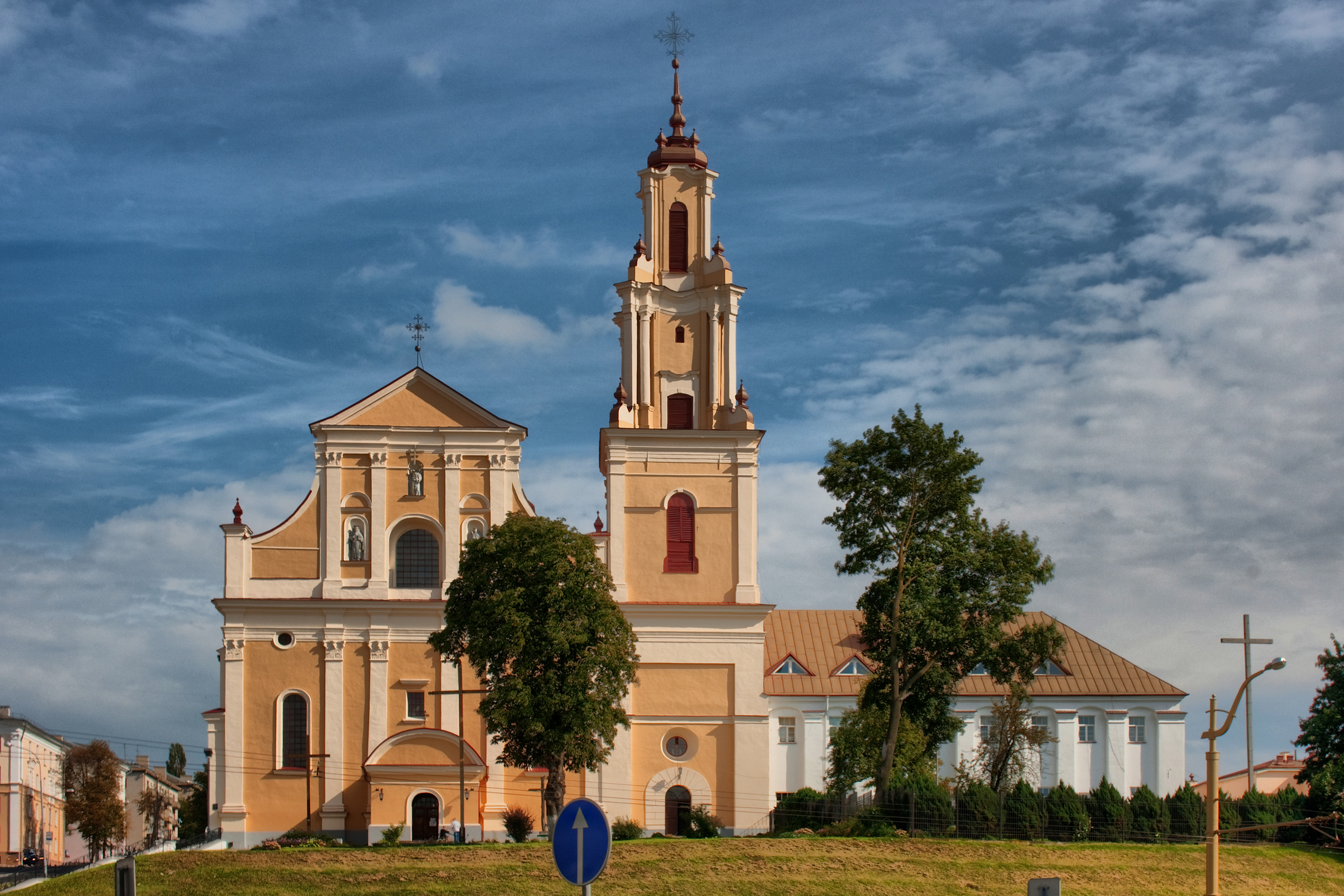
Bernardine Church (1595–1617)

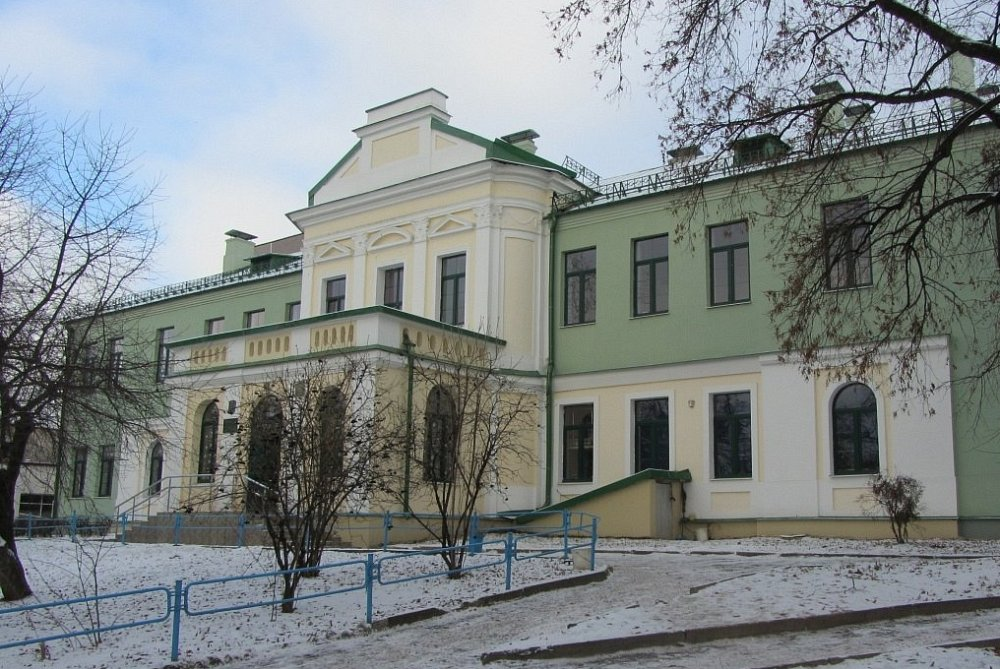
Palace of Stanisław August Poniatowski (1770s)

The Cathedral of St. Francis Xavier stands on Batory Square (now: Soviet Square). The cathedral was a Jesuit church until 1773. This specimen of high Baroque architecture, exceeding 50 metres in height, was started in 1678. Due to wars that rocked Poland-Lithuania at that time, the cathedral was consecrated only 27 years later, in the presence of Augustus II the Strong and Peter the Great. Its late Baroque frescoes were executed in 1752.

The extensive grounds of the Bernardine monastery (1602–18), renovated in 1680 and 1738, display all the styles flourishing in the 17th century, from Gothic to Baroque. The interior is considered a masterpiece of Vilnian Baroque. Other monastic establishments include the old Franciscan cloister (1635), Basilian convent (1720–51, by Giuseppe Fontana III), the church of the Bridgettine cloister (1642, one of the earliest Baroque buildings in the region) with the wooden two-storey dormitory (1630s) still standing on the grounds, and the 18th-century buildings of the Dominican monastery (its cathedral was demolished in 1874).

Other sights in Grodno include the Orthodox cathedral, a polychrome Russian Revival extravaganza from 1904; the botanical garden, the first in the Polish–Lithuanian Commonwealth, founded in 1774; a curiously curved building on the central square (1780s); a 254-metre-high TV tower (1984); and Stanisławów, a summer residence of the last Polish king.

== Transport ==
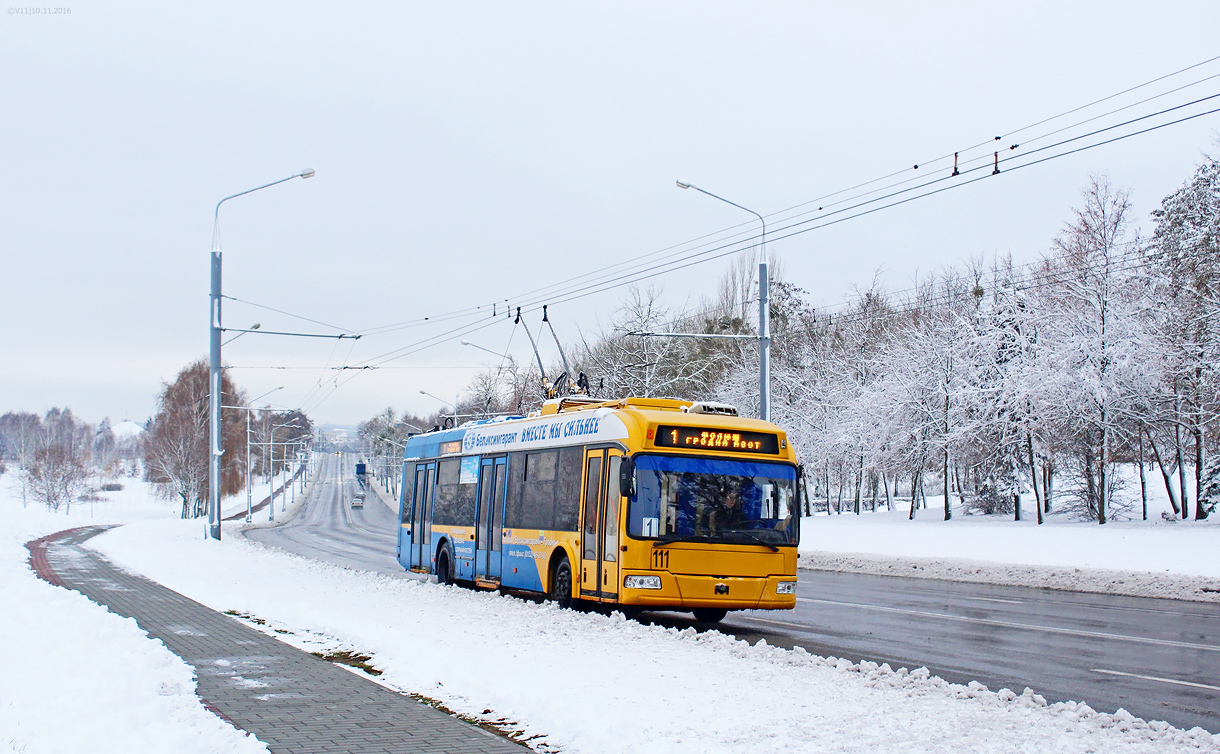
A trolleybus on route 1 in November 2016

The city is served by Grodno Airport located 18 km south-east of Grodno. Some seasonal international and charter flights are available throughout the year.

Starting 13 July 2026, a direct bus route to Warsaw Chopin Airport in Poland will start operating.

The city's public transport includes trolleybuses, which began operating in Grodno on 5 November 1974. The trolleybus system is operated by the city, and in 2009 it had 12 routes and carried around 66.5 million passengers per year. Additional routes have been opened subsequently, including routes 21 and 22 in November 2019.

Its railway station was once an important stop on the Poland-Lithuania route, but this has been cut on the Lithuanian side.

== Sport ==
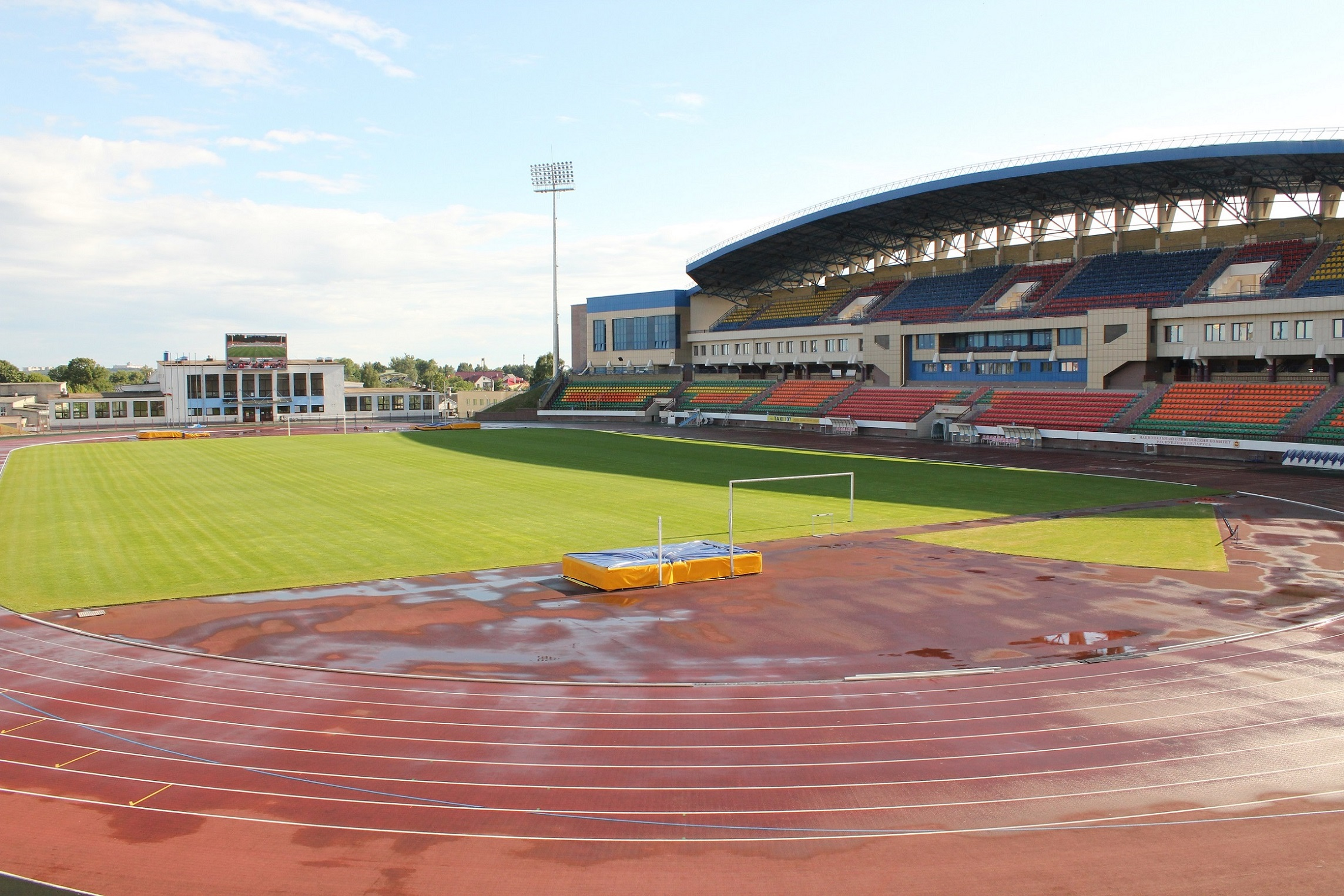
Neman Stadium

The main sport venues of the city are: Neman Stadium official CSC Nyoman (8800 seats), based teams: FC Neman Grodno, FHC Ritm (Grodno); Grodno Ice Sports Palace (2539 seats), based teams: HC Neman Grodno, HC Neman Grodno; Grodno Indoor ice rink in Pyshki; Sport complex "Viktoryya", based teams: basketball club Grodno-93, women basketball club Alimpiya, handball club Kronan, women handball club Haradnichanka

== Education ==
- Yanka Kupala State University of Grodno
- Grodno State Medical University
- Grodno State Agrarian University
- Grodno Higher Theological Seminary

There are also 41 middle schools (or secondary schools) in Grodno.

== Culture ==
Grodno Regional Drama Theatre

In 21 club municipal offices are more than 220 collectives, circles, and studios in which about 6500 children and adults engage in amateur performances. Of 83 on-stage performance groups 39 are ranked "national", 43 "exemplary", and one "professional".

Every two years since 1996 the Festival of National Cultures, the largest in Belarus, attracts many visitors to the city.

Various festivals, national holidays and ceremonies are held annually in Grodno, among them "Student's spring", an international celebration of piano music or the republican festival of theatrical youth.

In 2001 the Grodno regional executive committee established the Alexander Dubko award, named for the governor of Grodnenshchina, for the best creative achievements in the sphere of culture. 84 persons have been awarded this prize.

== Notable people ==
Born in the town

- David of Grodno (died 1326), one of the famous military commander of Gediminas, Grand Duke of Lithuania
- January Suchodolski (1797–1875), Polish painter and Army officer
- Zygmunt Wróblewski (1845–1888), Polish physicist and chemist
- Moisey Ostrogorsky (1854–1921), political scientist, co-founder of political sociology
- Bronisław Bohaterewicz (1870–1940), Polish General, murdered in the Katyn Massacre
- Juliusz Rómmel (1881–1967), Polish military officer, General of the Polish Army
- Karol Rómmel (1888–1967), Polish military officer and sportsman
- Leib Naidus (1890–1918), Yiddish poet
- Anton Gretzky (1892-1973), Polish-born grandfather of ice hockey player Wayne Gretzky
- Helena Antipoff (1892-1974), Russian-born Brazilian psychologist.
- Anne Azgapetian (born 1888), nurse during World War I, fundraiser for Armenian relief causes
- Aleksei Antonov (1896–1962), Chief of the General Staff of the Soviet Army from February 1945
- David Rubinoff (1897–1986), American violinist
- Jake Lansky, American mobster
- Meyer Lansky (born Maier Suchowljansky; 1902–1983), American central figure in the Jewish Mafia and highly influential figure in the Italian Mafia
- Haim-Moshe Shapira (1902–1970), Israeli Minister of Health, Minister of Immigration, Minister of Internal Affairs, Minister of Religions, Minister of Welfare, and Minister of Health, and a signatory of Israel's declaration of independence
- Herman Yablokoff (1903–1981), Jewish American actor, singer, composer, poet, playwright, director and producer
- Henryk Hlebowicz (1904–1941), Polish Diocesan Priest (Blessed)
- Chaim Dov Rabinowitz (1909–2001), Hebrew rabbi noted for his commentary on the Hebrew Bible
- Zelik Epstein (1914–2009), prominent Orthodox Rabbi and head of a yeshiva
- Eitan Livni (1919–1991), Israeli politician, Irgun activist and father of Tzipi Livni
- Kanstantsin Lukashyk (born 1975), shooter who became the youngest gold medalist in shooting during the 1992 Olympics
- Paul Baran (born Pesach Baran; 1926–2011), American Internet pioneer and technology entrepreneur
- Wiktor Woroszylski (1927–1996), Polish poet and author
- Jerzy Maksymiuk (born 1936), Polish musician and director
- Victor Aladjev (1942–2025), Estonian mathematician and cybernetician, creator of the scientific school on the theory of homogeneous structures
- Alaksandar Milinkievič (1947–2026), Belarusian politician, candidate in the 2006 presidential elections
- Olga Korbut (born 1955), gymnast and four-time gold medallist at 1972 and 1976 Olympic Games
- Valery Levaneuski (born 1963), entrepreneur, politician and former political prisoner
- Valery Tsepkalo (born 1965), diplomat and executive, founder of Belarus Hi-Tech Park.
- Alexander Butko (born 1986), Olympic volleyball player
- Andrey Ashyhmin (born 1974), footballer
- Pavel Savitski (born 1994), footballer
- Sergey Grinevich (born 1960) Belarusian painter.
- Aleksandr Skorobogatov (born 1963), writer
- Dzianis Ivashyn (born 1979), Belarusian journalist and political prisoner
- Maksim Hardzeika (born 1989), Belarusian boxer
- Danil Kopach (born 2000), Belarusian footballer

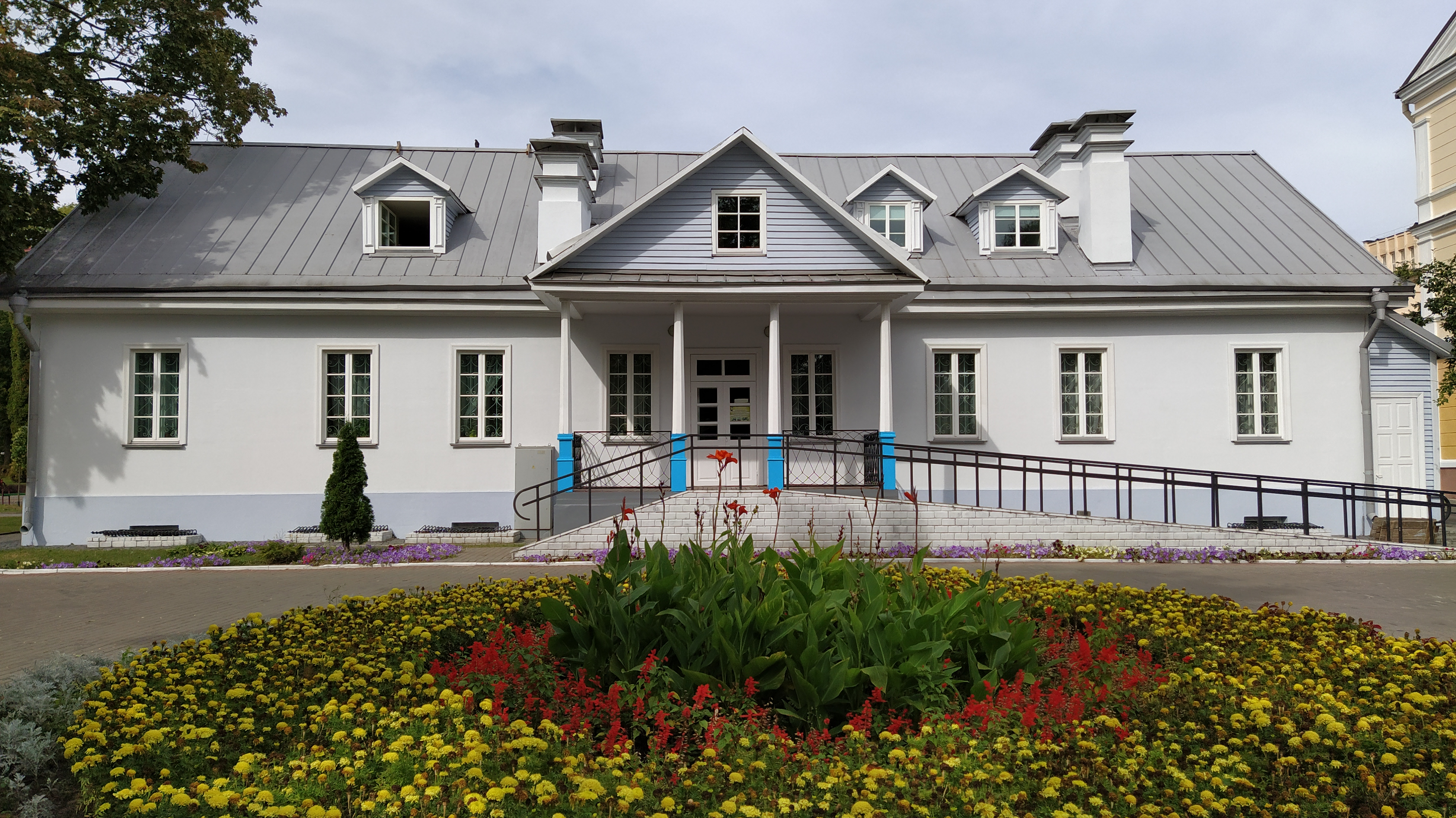
Museum of writer Eliza Orzeszkowa at her former home

Active in Grodno

- Vytautas the Great (1350–1430), Grand Duke of Lithuania, commander of the forces of the Grand Duchy in the Battle of Grunwald
- Grigory Bogdanovich Volovich, (1535–1577), mayor of Grodno 1558 to 1566
- Antoni Tyzenhaus (1733–1785), starost of Grodno, founder of numerous factories in the area
- Jean-Emmanuel Gilibert (1741–1814), French medic, botanist and biologist
- Benjamin Ashkenazi (1824–1894), communal worker and philanthropist
- L. L. Zamenhof (1859–1917), Polish physician, creator of Esperanto
- Pyotr Stolypin (1862–1911) in 1903 as a governor
- Maksim Bahdanovič (1891–1917), a Belarusian poet, journalist and literary critic.
- Józef Olszyna-Wilczyński (1890–1939), Polish general, commander of the military region, murdered nearby by the Soviets
- Jan Kochanowski, a Polish creator of the local ZOO, murdered by the Nazis
- Paweł Jasienica (1909–1970), a Polish historian and author, started his career as a history teacher in Grodno in the 1920s and 1930s
- Vasil’ Bykaw (1924–2003), a Belarusian author
- Solomon Perel (1925–2023), a German Jew who survived World War II by masquerading as an ethnic German. He spent two years at a Komsomol-run orphanage in Grodno, before Operation Barbarossa
- Czesław Niemen (1939–2004), Polish musician, composer and one of the pioneers of progressive rock studied at a local music school
- Andżelika Borys (born 1973), former leader of Grodno-based Union of Poles in Belarus

Died in Grodno

- Casimir IV Jagiellon (1427–1492), King of Poland and Grand Duke of Lithuania
- Saint Casimir (1458–1484), Roman Catholic saint and the patron saint of Lithuania
- Stephen Báthory (1533–1586), King of Poland and Grand Duke of Lithuania
- Alexander Süsskind of Grodno (died 1794), Kabbalist
- Nachum Kaplan (1811–1879), preacher and philanthropist
- Eliza Orzeszkowa (1841–1910), Polish writer, born nearby and active in Grodno

== Twin towns and sister cities ==
Grodno is twinned with:

- Ashkelon, Israel
- Cheboksary, Russia
- Dzerzhinsk, Russia
- Khimki, Russia
- Kraljevo, Serbia
- Limoges, France
- Minden, Germany
- Qabala District, Azerbaijan
- Rancho Cordova, United States
- Shchukino District (Moscow), Russia
- Tambov, Russia
- Tuapsinsky District, Russia
- Vologda, Russia
- Žilina, Slovakia

== Significant depictions in popular culture ==
- Grodno is one of the starting towns of Lithuania in the turn-based strategy game Medieval II: Total War: Kingdoms.
- Grodno is a location for one of the missions in the alternate history RTS Command and Conquer: Red Alert; Grodno was part of the Soviet Union and the Allied forces must work to rescue a special operative before her execution in a Soviet military base.

== See also ==
- Battle of Grodno (1939)
- Disputed territories of Baltic States
- List of early East Slavic states
- Gordon (disambiguation)
- Great Synagogue (Grodno)
- Grodno Ghetto
