= Church of the Annunciation of the Blessed Virgin Mary, Grodno =

Church building in Grodno, Belarus

Coordinates: 53.6771°N 23.8360°E

Church of Annunciation of Virgin Mary
- Касцёл Дабравешчання Найсвяцейшай Дзевы Марыі і кляштар брыгітак
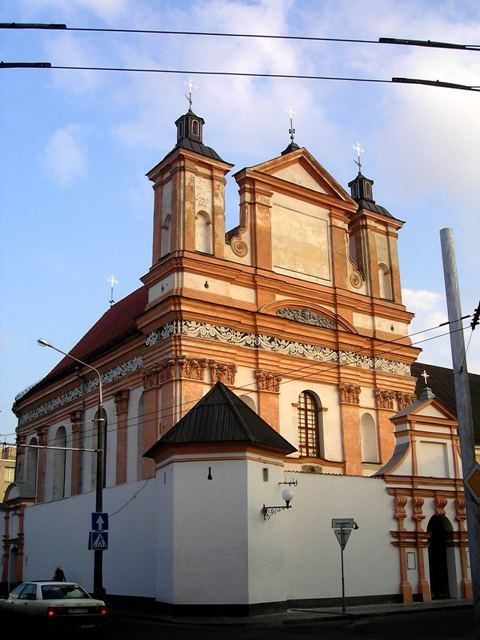

- Location within Belarus
- Location: Grodno (Karl Marks str., 27)
- Country: Belarus
- Denomination: Roman Catholic church
- Religious institute: Bridgettines

History
- Founder: Krzysztof Wiesiołowski

Architecture
- Architect: Benedetto Molli
- Style: Baroque
- Construction cost: 1634

Administration
- Diocese: Roman Catholic Diocese of Grodno

The Church of the Annunciation of the Blessed Virgin Mary is a part of the Bridgettines monastery in Grodno, listed Cultural Heritage of Belarus.

== History ==
=== In the Grand Duchy of Lithuania ===
In 1634 the nobleman Krzysztof Wiesiołowski and his wife Aleksandra-Mariana Sobieski invited the Bridgettines order to Hrodna and presented it with lands in the city and on its outskirts. In 1636 a wooden church was constructed and replaced in 1642 with a stone one created by the Italian architect Benedetto Molli. The First eight nuns entered the monastery in 1636.

In 1646 Flemish artist of German origin Johann Schroeter painted altar pictures for the church. The series included such scenes as the Holy Family, the Immaculate Conception of the Virgin Mary, Saint Anna, the Annunciation, Saint Brigid, etc.

The church was consecrated on October 19, 1651, by the bishop Jerzy Tyszkiewicz.

The church kept genuine relics of Pope Clement I, confirmed by the Roman Curia in 1768.

During the Russo-Polish War of 1654–1667, nuns were forced to leave the city and stayed in Gdańsk for three years.

=== In the Russian Empire ===
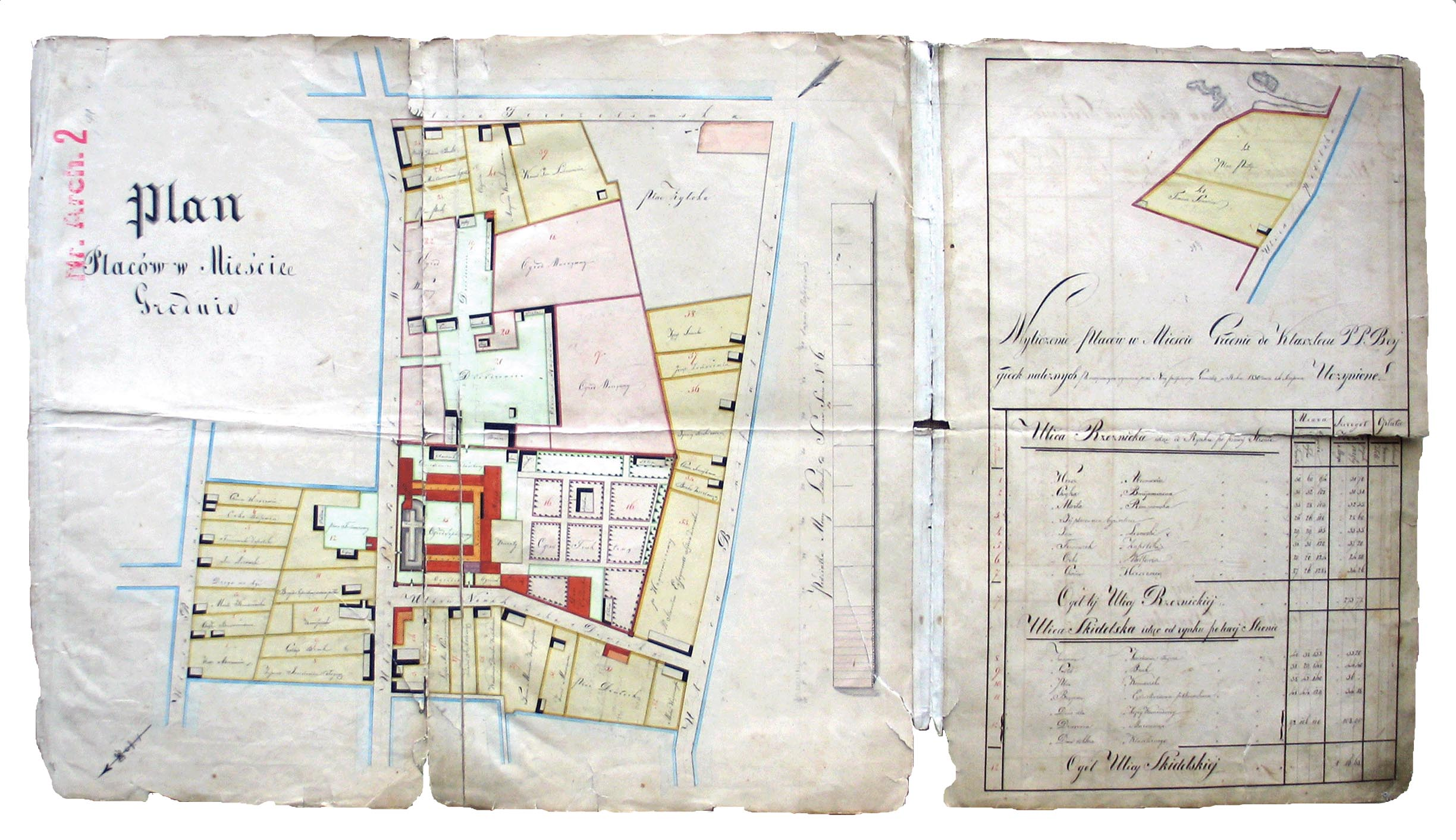
Map of the monastery property in 1830

After the 1827 fire the complex was restored, a new building was constructed and closed the territory, forming a rectangular inner yard.

In 1842 Russian authorities ordered to close the monastery, but allowed nuns to stay and live there. Also, Benedictine nuns from Nyasvizh, Dominicans from Novogrudok, and Bridgettines from Lutsk were moved there.

In the 19th century, the authorities used the monastery as a prison. In 1827 the Decembrists Kornelia and Ksaveriya Rukevich were kept here. For taking part in the January Uprising the Russian government punished the Roman Catholic church with contributions and the monastery in Grodno was forced to pay 533 roubles to the treasury.

In 1885 the church was almost destroyed by fire, it burned down the bell tower and melted the doors of the temple. By 1891, only 5 nuns still lived in the monastery, in 1907 remained only 2.

In 1908 the monastery was given to the Sisters of the Holy Family of Nazareth.

=== XXI Century ===
In 1990 the church and the monastery complex were returned to the Sisters of the Holy Family of Nazareth. In the following years the facades of the church and its roof were restored.

In 2020 the sisterhood opened a museum to exhibit the artifacts collected through its 370-years long history.

== Gallery ==
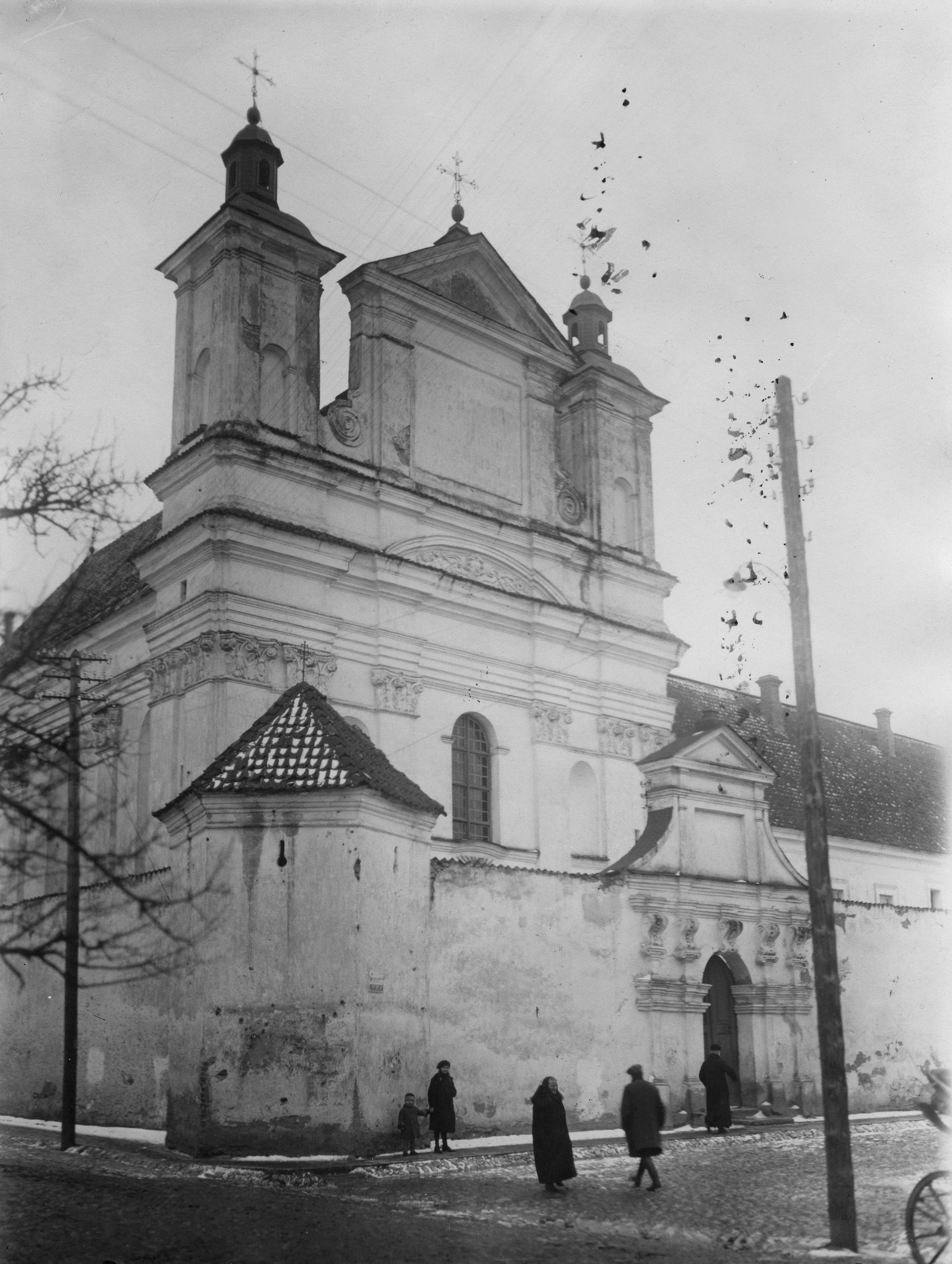
March 1926

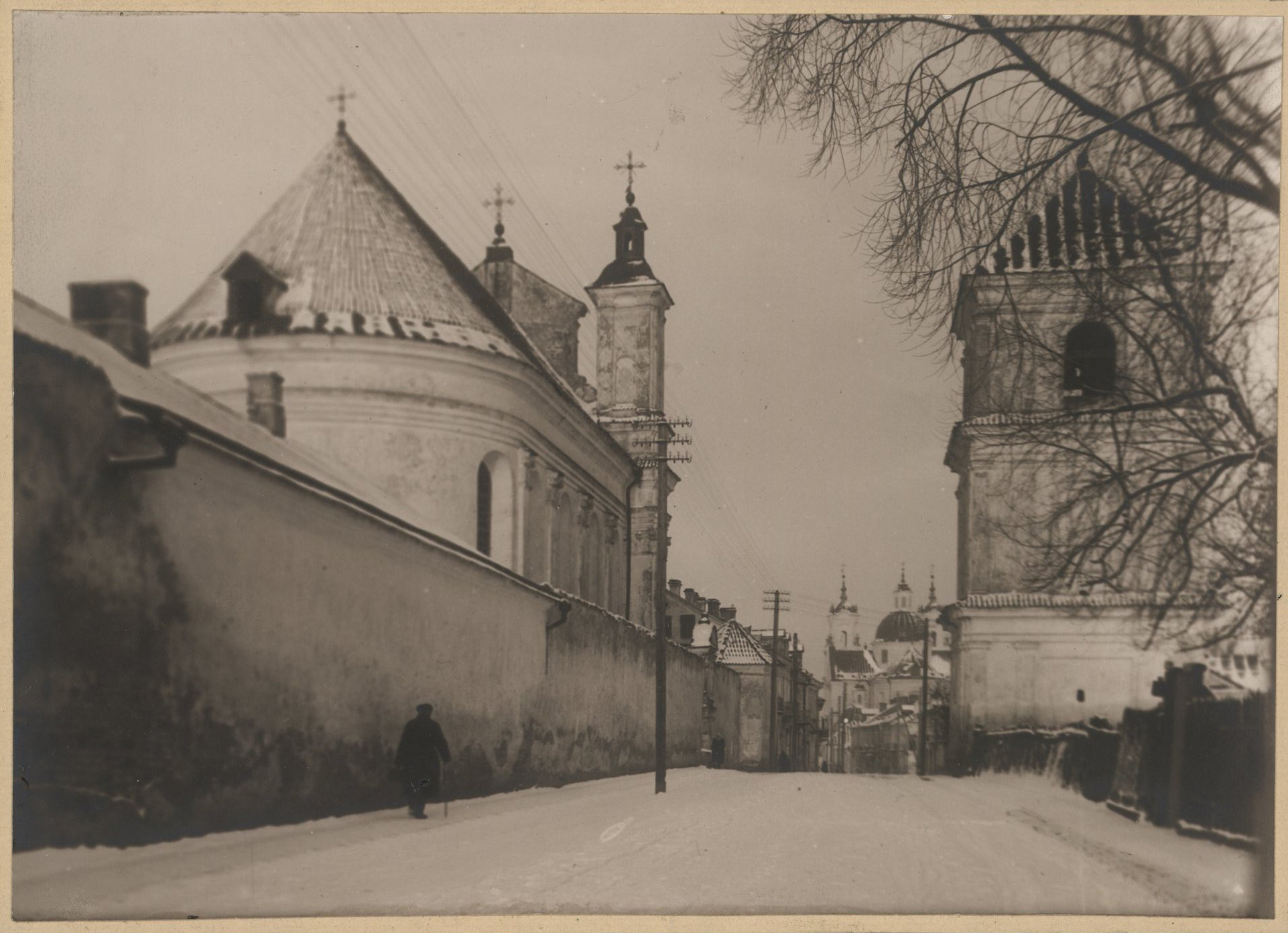
Before 1927

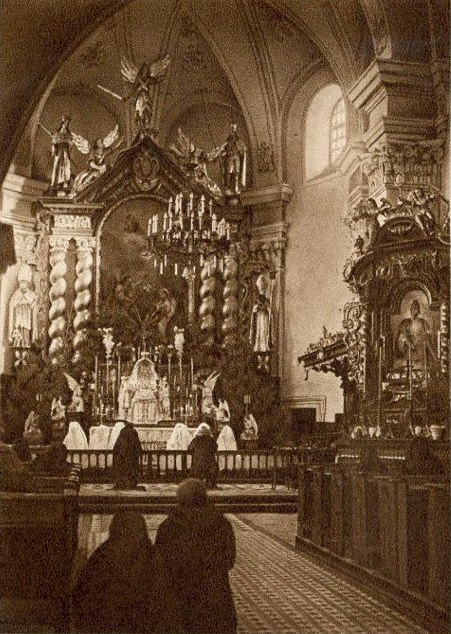
1930

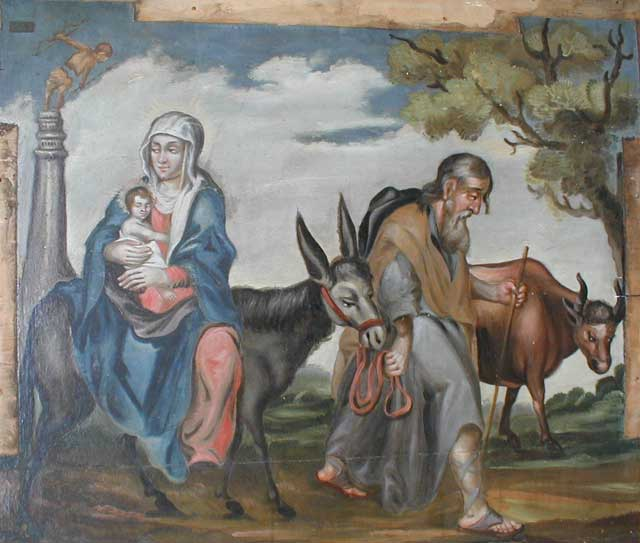
Fresco

== Sources ==
- Vashkevich, A.; Gostsey, A.; Sayapin, V. (2012). Біяграфія гарадзенскіх вуліц. Ад Фартоў да Каложы [Streets in Hrodna: from Fartou to Kalozha] (in Belarusian). Гродна-Вроцлаў: Вроцлаўская навуковая друкарня. p. 370. ISBN 978-83-61617-77-8.
