= Andrey Ashyhmin =

Belarusian footballer

Personal information
- Date of birth: 2 December 1974 (age 51)
- Place of birth: Grodno, Byelorussian SSR, Soviet Union
- Height: 1.80 m (5 ft 11 in)
- Position: Goalkeeper

Team information
- Current team: Veles Moscow (GK coach)

Youth career
- 1992–1994: Kardan-Flyers Grodno

Senior career*
Years	Team	Apps	(Gls)
1994–1997	Kardan-Flyers Grodno	51	(0)
1998–2000	Dinamo Brest	16	(0)
2000	Neman Mosty	12	(0)
2001	Lida	22	(0)
2002	Neman Grodno	0	(0)
2003–2004	Belshina Bobruisk	21	(0)
2005–2009	Neman Grodno	49	(0)

Managerial career
- 2010–2015: Neman Grodno (GK coach)
- 2015–2016: Arsenal Tula (GK coach)
- 2016: Isloch Minsk Raion (GK coach)
- 2017: Dinamo Minsk (GK coach)
- 2017–2024: Isloch Minsk Raion (GK coach)
- 2021–2023: Belarus U21 (GK coach)
- 2024–: Veles Moscow (GK coach)
- * Club domestic league appearances and goals

Andrey Ashyhmin (Belarusian: Андрэй Ашыхмін; Russian: Андрей Ашихмин; born 2 December 1974) is a Belarusian professional football coach and former player. He is the goalkeeping coach with Russian club Veles Moscow.
