= Grigory Bogdanovich Volovich =

Lithuanian statesman

Grigory Bogdanovich Volovich (1535–1577) was a statesman of the Grand Duchy of Lithuania, diplomat of the Lord's gentleman (from 1548), the Mayor of Grodno (1558–1566), Marshal of Dvorny (1560–1563), of the Lord's Stalker (1567–1574), governor of Smolensk Voivodeship (1571–1577), the elder of Mstsislaw (1548–1567), sovereign of Varniany and Zel’va (1558–1569).

== Biography ==
Grigory Volovich was a representative of the Russian-Lithuanian noble family Volovichi with arms "Bogoria". He was son of Bogdan Volovich, whose father, Gregory Volovich, groom the Grand Duke of Lithuania (1459) and was the ancestor of the genus Volovichi. His sibling Ostafiia Bogdanovich was Chancellor of the Lithuanian (1579-1587). In 1563, Grigory was sent as ambassador to Moscow, to the court of Tsar Ivan the Terrible. Referred to as the auditor of forests and forests in 1559. By decree of Sigismund II Augustus he founded the city Wasilków (now Podlasie, in Podlasie Voivodeship, Poland). Volovich converted from Eastern Orthodoxy to Calvinism, and later became Catholic. Around 1564 he married Katherine Yurlevne, the widow of Prince Matthew Bogdanovich Oginski, Elder of Kovno. In this marriage was born Hieronim Wołłowicz, Lithuanian officer, Roman, elder of Rahachow and Pëtr, Chashnik Lithuanian.
