= Savieckaja Square =

Square in Grodno, Belarus

Coordinates: 53.6778°N 23.8297°E

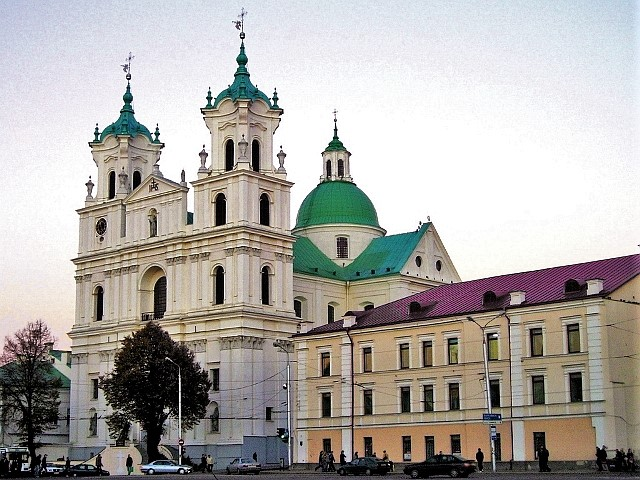
Savieckaja (Batory) Square in the centre of Grodno

Savieckaja Square (Belarusian: Савецкая плошча, Russian: Советская площадь, Sovetskaya Square) is the central square for the city of Grodno in Belarus.

The Muraujou House (Belarusian: Дом купца Мураўёва) located on the square was briefly the seat of the government of the Belarusian Democratic Republic in 1919, after the government has left Minsk to escape the approaching Russian Red Army.

In 1921–1939, while Grodno and the rest of West Belarus were part of the Second Polish Republic, the square was named Batory Square after Stephen Báthory, King of Poland who had a residence here in the 16th century.
