= Leib Naidus =

- לײב נײַדוס
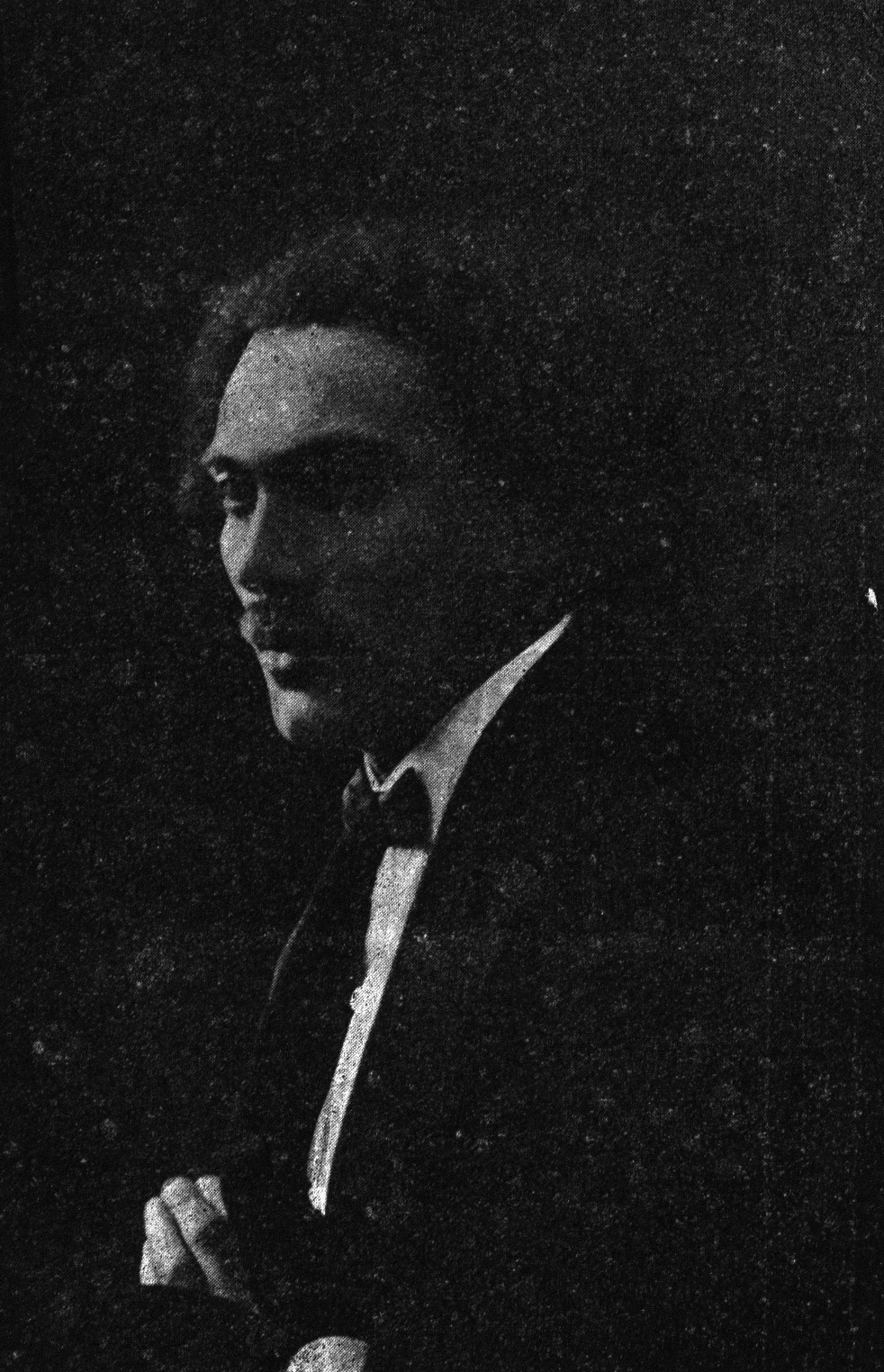
- Born: 6 October 1890; Grodno
- Died: 23 December 1918 (aged 28); Grodno
- Occupation: poet
- Writing career
- Language: Yiddish, Russian
- Years active: 1907–18
- Genres: romantic poetry, lyric poetry

Leib Naidus (1890–1918, Yiddish: לײב נײַדוס, Russian: Лейб Найдус) was a Yiddish poet and literary translator from the Russian Empire. He died young and his poems were not widely published during his lifetime, but they were printed in a number of volumes in the 1920s and gained some acclaim for having a unique modern voice in lyric and romantic styles.

== Biography ==
Naidus was born on 6 October 1890 in Grodno, Grodno Governorate, Russian Empire (today in Belarus). His family were wealthy intellectual Jews influenced by the Jewish Enlightenment (Haskalah); his father was Isaac Leibovich and his mother was Rachel. Until the age of 10, Leib lived on the family estate in Kustin, near Grodno, receiving tutoring from private teachers. He left at age 10 to enroll in a school in Radom. At that age he began to wrote poetry in Hebrew, Yiddish and Russian, occasionally publishing pieces in Russian newspapers. After spending two years in Radom, he transferred to a business school in Białystok. He became involved in the Socialist Zionist movement and was expelled from school for supporting the Russian Revolution of 1905; he enrolled in a school in Kaunas but was expelled again in 1907 for similar reasons. It was in 1907 that he began to publish in Yiddish in the Warsaw publication Roman-Tsaytung. He completed his education between 1908 and 1911 at a school in Vilnius. After that he devoted himself almost entirely to writing poetry. At around this time he began a correspondence with a woman he referred to often in his poetry as H. G. (Khaye Gozhanska).

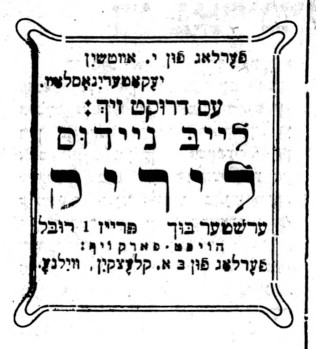
Advertisement for Neidus' "Lirik" (1915)

During the First World War, Germany occupied Vilnius; for a time Naidus left the city to live on his parents' estate near Grodno. By 1915 he printed his first chapbook in Vilnius with funding from a supporter in Yekaterinoslav, titled Lyric; however, due to the wartime conditions he was not able to properly distribute it and it received little attention from critics. H. G. fell ill with tuberculosis and was sent to recover in Switzerland. By 1916 Naidus was involved in the cultural life in Grodno, also under German occupation, and worked closely on various cultural activities with another intellectual called Avram Zak. Aside from his original poetry, he also continued to translate the works of various French and Russian poets into Yiddish, notably Alexander Pushkin and Mikhail Lermontov. The last two years of his life were his most active, in which he helped publish literary magazines and wrote a significant amount of poetry which was only published after his death. The only other booklet he published during this time was Di Fleyt fun Pan ("Pan's flute"). It was during a literary tour in the Grodno region in 1918 that he contracted diphtheria. After only a few days of illness in his apartment in Grodno he died on 23 December 1918. He was only 28 years old. He was buried in the New Jewish Cemetery in Grodno.

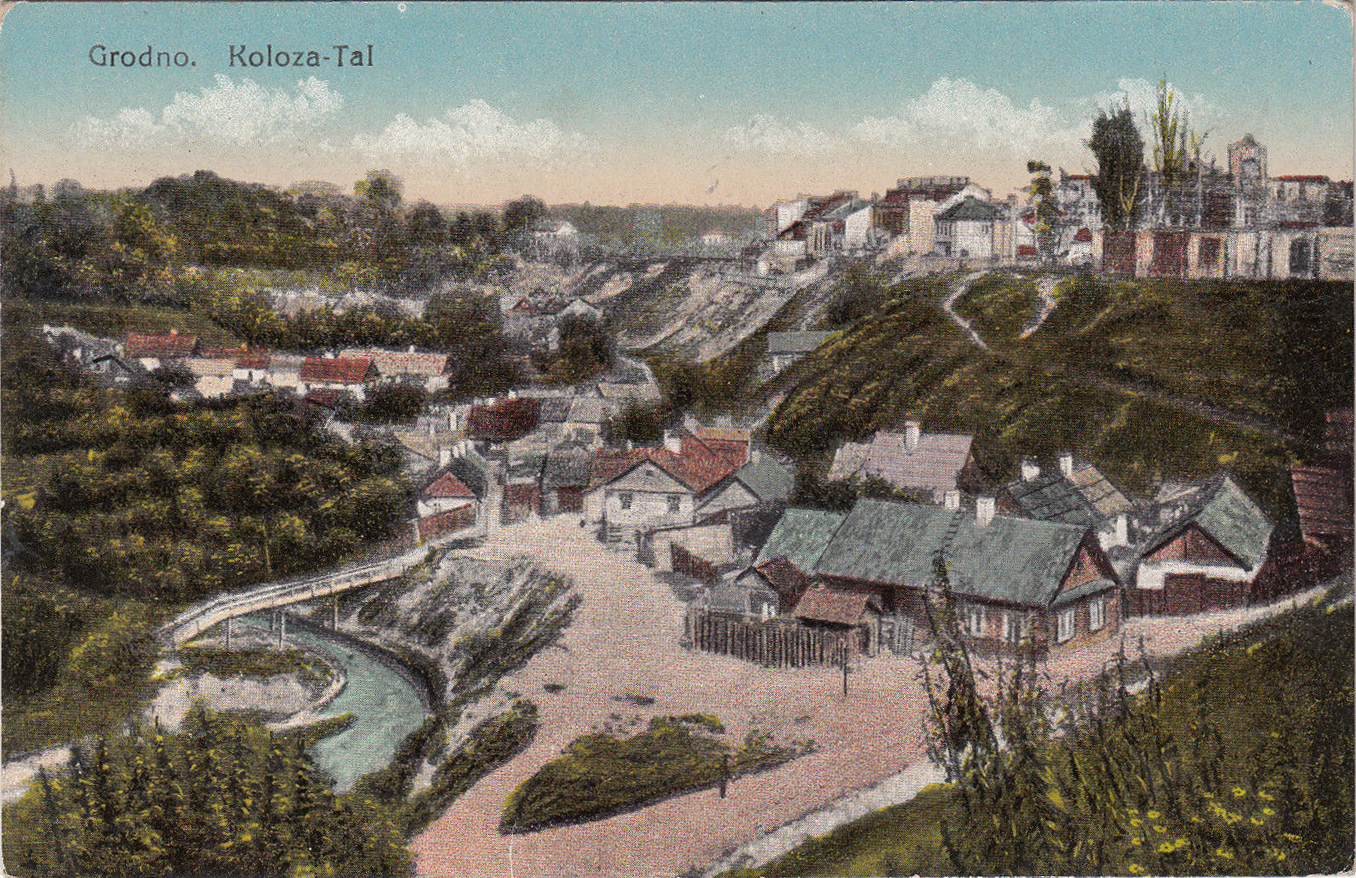
Grodno postcard circa 1915–8

== Legacy ==
After his death Naidus' poems continued to be published in magazines like Vilna's Di Vokh (The Week). His works continued to circulate and be appreciated for their sophistication in terms of romantic and lyric poetic forms, their influences from classical, French and Russian poetry, and their clever uses of Yiddish grammar. During the 1920s, with the assistance of friends (especially his former collaborator Avram Zak), several of his books of poetry were printed in Warsaw. A number of literary essays and booklets were published about his work after World War II, notably in Israel and Argentina, and in 1958 the Buenos Aires branch of YIVO published a book of his poetic works as volume 5 of their series Musterverk fun der yidisher literatur (Master works of Yiddish literature).

His poems have been adapted to music many times dating back to the period he was still alive. Recent adaptations include ones by The Klezmatics on The Well (1998) and Anthony Mordechai Tzvi Russell on Kosmopolitn (2022).

== Selected works ==
- Lirik (Vilnius/Yekaterinoslav 1916)
- Di Fleyt fun Pan ("Pan's flute", Grodno, 1918)
- Dos Bukh fun Poemen ("The book of poems", Warsaw, 1923)
- Litvishe Arabeskn ("Lithuanian arabesques", Warsaw, Yatshkovski press, 1924)
- Rusishe dikhtung: Pushkin un Lermontov (Warsaw, 1926)
- Ale verk - Lirik (Warsaw, 1927)
- Fun Velt-Parnas (Warsaw, 1928)
- Leyb Naydus: oysgeklibene shriftn ("Leyb Naydus: Selected Works", Argentina, IWO, 1958)
