= Chaim Dov Rabinowitz =

Rabbi Chaim Dov Rabinowitz
- חיים דב רבינוביץ

Personal life
- Born: 1911 Izabelin, Grodno Region, Belarus
- Died: April 2001 (aged 89–90)
- Known for: Da'ath Soferim commentary on the Hebrew Bible, The History of the Jewish People - From Nechemia to the Present
- Occupation: Rabbi, Educator, Sofer, Author

Religious life
- Religion: Judaism
- Denomination: Orthodox

Chaim Dov Rabinowitz (Hebrew: חיים דב רבינוביץ; January 24, 1911 – April 18, 2001) was a Haredi rabbi, educator, sofer and author. He is most well-known for his monumental commentary on the Hebrew Bible (Da'ath Soferim) and a history of the Jewish people (The History of the Jewish People - From Nechemia to the Present).

== Biography ==
Rabbi Rabinowitz was born in the town of Izabelin (a shtetl in the Vawkavysk district of the Grodno Region) to Chana Liebe and Rabbi Shraga Feitel Rabinowitz, the rabbi of the town. In his youth he studied at Yeshiva Ohel Torah-Baranovich and later at Yeshiva Shaar HaTorah-Grodna under the tutelage of some of the foremost Haredi leaders of the time such as Rabbi Elchonon Wasserman and Rabbi Shimon Shkop.

Rabinowitz moved to Israel shortly before the World War II (1937) settling in Tel Aviv. There he directed the Ohel Yaakov Talmud Torah, the first Hareidi Talmud Torah in that city. In the aftermath of the war, Rabinowitz was very active on behalf of the immigrants in the transit camps.

== Biblical exegesis ==
Rabinowitz's magnum opus is Daat Sofrim, a commentary on all of the Hebrew Bible. There are several distinguishing features to this work. The first is his attempt to de-emphasize the negative aspects of ancient Jewish life that appear in the Bible. Rabinowitz in his role of "Defender of Israel" emphasizes that seen within the correct context, and with a proper understanding of the historical background, the negative stories are scarcely as bad as they appear. (See for example his explanation defining the differences between the story of the Levite concubine at Giveah and the story of Sodom)

A second interesting feature are his (possibly the only Haredi) attempts to resolve some of the issues raised by biblical criticism. Thus he identifies the second part of the Book of Isaiah as possibly being written by a different author based on an oral tradition from Isaiah.

== History ==
Rabinowitz, in his volume on history, (From Nechemia to the Present) emphasizes that the study of history in and of itself is a waste of time. One must focus to a large degree on the moral lessons inherent in the history. In line with this each chapter is divided into two sections. The first section is a brief overview of the period under discussion. The second is an in depth discussion, in question and answer form, on the difficult aspects of history. For example, he questions what led the Jews to leave a relatively peaceful life in Iraq for the more difficult, anti-semitic countries in Europe. At all opportunities Rabinowitz demonstrates what he sees as the "hand of G-d" directing the course of history.

=== Sources ===
For the Second Temple and Geonic period, Rabinowitz largely quotes the opinion of Yitzchok Isaac Halevy although he frequently disagrees with his interpretation of events. This period is also based on the writings of Josephus and the Talmud. He also makes use of the historians Ze'ev Jawitz and Heinrich Graetz, and occasionally cites Encyclopaedia Judaica as well.

Rabinowitz presents an idiosyncratic Jewish Orthodox picture of history. For example, as opposed to the typical Haredi viewpoint that Moses Mendelssohn caused the assimilation of German Jewry, Rabinowitz writes that Mendelssohn's work was in fact very similar to that of the founder of neo-orthodoxy Samson Raphael Hirsch and that assimilation was mostly a result of the challenges of the Enlightenment.

In his discussions he analyses several social issues that were improperly or insufficiently remedied in the past. For instance, he expresses astonishment that the issue of education for Jewish girls was so long ignored given the obvious need for such an institution.

His works bear approbations from most of the leading Haredi rabbis of his time including: Yaakov Kamenetsky, Moshe Feinstein, the Lubavitcher Rebbe and many others.

== Partial bibliography ==
- Daat Soferim commentary on the Hebrew Bible (Heb. with an English translation available)
- From Nechemia to the Present (Heb. with an English translation available)
- A guide to teaching the early prophets (Heb.)
- Recollections (Heb.) - Description of the pre-war Lithuanian Jewish yeshiva world
