= Ambassadors and envoys from Russia to Poland (1763–1794) =

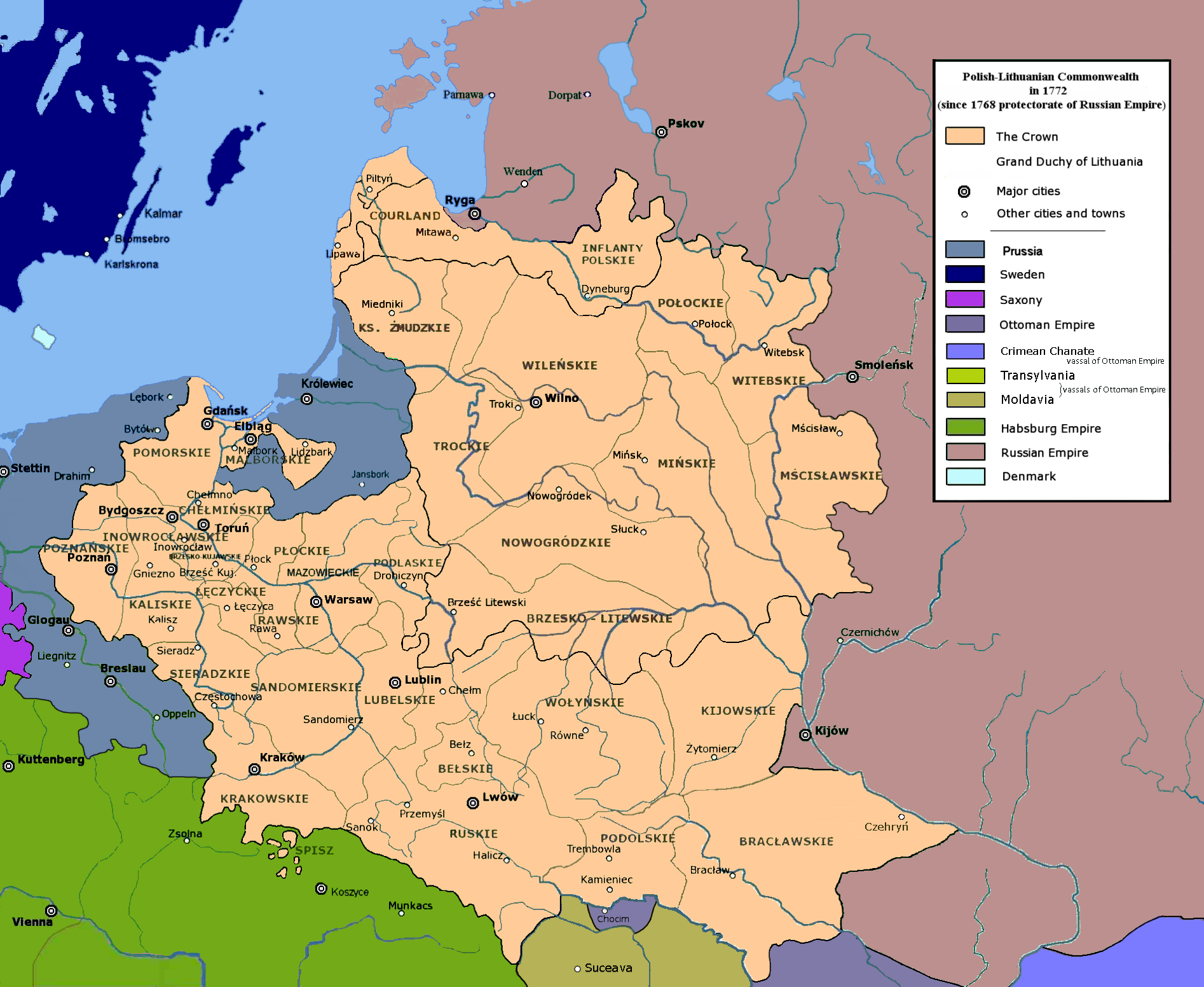
Polish–Lithuanian Commonwealth as a protectorate of Russian Empire in 1772

Ambassadors and envoys from Russia to Poland–Lithuania in the years 1763–1794 were among the most important characters in the politics of Poland. Their powers went far beyond those of most diplomats and can be compared to those of viceroys in the colonies of Spanish Empire, or Roman Republic's proconsuls in Roman provinces. During most of that period^{[a]} ambassadors and envoys from the Russian Empire, acting on the instructions from Saint Petersburg, held a de facto position superior to that of the Polish king, Stanisław August Poniatowski. Backed by the presence of the Russian army within the borders of the Polish–Lithuanian Commonwealth, and leveraging the immense wealth of the Russian Empire, they were able to influence both the king and the Polish parliament, the Sejm. According to their demands, the king dispensed the Commonwealth offices among the Russian supporters, and the Sejm, bribed or threatened, voted as the Russians dictated. The agenda of the Permanent Council (Polish government) was edited and approved by the Russian ambassador, and the members of the council were approved by him.

Their power also manifested itself in many aspects of daily life, especially in the Polish capital of Warsaw: for example, a performance in the theatre would be delayed until the Russian ambassador arrived, even if the Polish king himself was present. In another incident, a Russian ambassador who arrived late in the theatre, with the Polish king again present, demanded that the spectacle should be restarted. Eventually this forceful expression of Russian diplomacy, backed by the military might of the Empire, and despite a few setbacks like the Bar Confederation, Constitution of May 3, 1791 and Kościuszko Uprising, achieved its goal of expanding Russian control over most of the Commonwealth territory and population.

== Background (before 1763) ==
Beginning in the second half of the 18th century, the unique political system of the Commonwealth, the quasi-democratic Golden Liberty, had turned into anarchy. The Polish nobility's (szlachta) privilege of liberum veto, first introduced as a safeguard against tyranny of the monarch, allowed any deputy to the Sejm to stop and annul the entire session. This was soon seen by the neighbouring powers - especially Prussia and Russia - as the perfect opportunity to disrupt the Commonwealth from inside, and soon many Sejms were dissolved by a deputy bribed by one of the foreign powers. With an impotent Sejm, the Commonwealth stagnated, as it was impossible to reform the government, raise taxes or increase the size of the army.

In 1717, Russia cemented its position as the dominant force in Poland, in the aftermath of the Great Northern War and amid the growing likelihood of a civil war in Poland between the Polish king August II the Strong and the Polish nobility. Russian tsar Peter I the Great, posing as the conciliator between the Commonwealth king and the szlachta, ordered units of the Russian army to enter Polish territory—using the treaties of alliance from the Great Northern War—and coerced the Polish Sejm of 1717 into accepting his 'compromise'. During that Sejm (known as the Silent Sejm, as only one person was allowed to speak aloud), laws were passed that not only eliminated the possibility of August strengthening his power, but also ensured by means of restricted taxation (and thus a constrained Polish army) that Poland would not be able to interfere with similar Russian interventions in the future. In reality, if not the letter of the law, the reforms of the Silent Sejm meant that the Commonwealth became a Russian protectorate, and it would be Russian ambassadors and envoys who would be responsible for this territory under the tsar. In 1730 than Russian ambassador to Poland, Karl Gustav von Löwenwolde, was instrumental in the Alliance of the Three Black Eagles (or Löwenwolde's Treaty), an agreement between Commonwealth's neighbours to preserve the dysfunctional state of affairs within it. Russian influence on Poland further increased during the War of the Polish Succession (1733–1738), when Russian military intervention overturned the result of the royal election of Stanisław Leszczyński.

== Herman Karl von Keyserling (1763–1764) ==
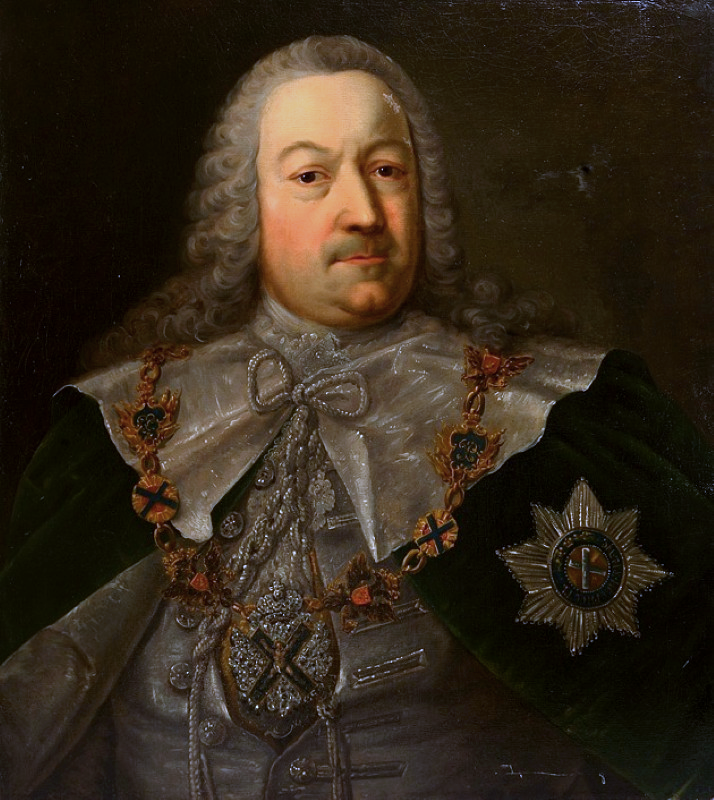
Herman Karl von Keyserling

Russian influence would not become permanent until the death of the Polish king August III the Saxon in 1764. During the free election that followed his death, one of the Polish magnate families, the Czartoryski party, known as the Familia, allied itself with Russia and, backed by the Russian army, forced the election of their relative (and former lover of Russian tsarina Catherine II the Great) Stanisław August Poniatowski. The Russian envoy overseeing the Familia's action and the election of Poniatowski was Herman Karl von Keyserling. Among other things, to ensure Poniatowski's victory he bribed the interrex of Poland, Władysław Aleksander Łubieński, with a significant sum of about 100,000 Russian rubles. The Russian army entered Poland again under the pretext of protecting Polish citizens from civil war. With such support, Poniatowski was soon elected king.

== Nicholas Repnin (1764–1768) ==
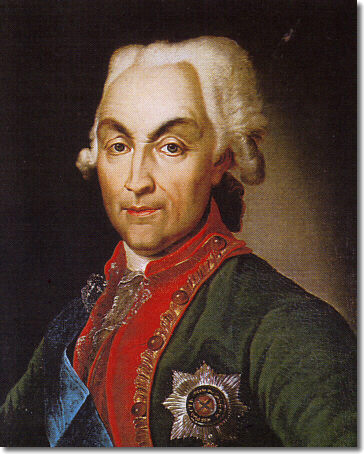
Nicholas Repnin.

Keyserling, who died in September, was soon replaced by Nicholas Repnin, who would become perhaps the most infamous of the Russian envoys of that period. In order to strengthen the Russian influence, he encouraged the civil war within the Commonwealth, also encouraging the conflict between Protestant and Catholic factions within the Polish nobility. This led to the formation of two Protestant konfederacjas (of Sluck and Toruń) and later, one Catholic (Radom Confederation, led by Karol Stanisław "Panie Kochanku" Radziwiłł).

Before the Sejm of 1767, he ordered the capture and exile to Kaluga of some vocal opponents of his policies, namely Józef Andrzej Załuski and Wacław Rzewuski.

Through the Polish nobles in his employ (like Gabriel Podoski, primate of Poland) or threatened by the presence of over 10,000 Russian soldiers in Warsaw in the very chambers of the parliament, Repnin, despite some misgivings about the methods he was ordered to employ, de facto dictated the terms of that Sejm. The intimidated Sejm, which met in October 1767 and adjourned in February 1768, appointed a commission (the so-called Delegated Sejm) which drafted a Polish–Russian treaty, approved in "silent session" (without debate) on February 27, 1768. The legislation undid some of the reforms of 1764 under Stanislaw II and pushed through legislation which ensured that the political system of the Commonwealth would be ineffective and easy to control by its foreign neighbours. The liberum veto, free election, neminem captivabimus, rights to form the confederation and rokosz—in other words, all the important old privileges of the nobility, which made the Commonwealth political system (the Golden Liberty) so ungovernable—were guaranteed as unalterable parts in the cardinal laws.

Repnin's Sejm marked one of the important milestones in increasing Polish dependence on the Russian Empire, and its devolution into a protectorate. This dependent position was bluntly spelled out in Nikita Ivanovich Panin's letter to King Poniatowski, in which he made it clear that Poland was now in the Russian sphere of influence.

Nonetheless, the Russian intervention led to the Confederation of Bar, which practically destroyed the ambassador's handiwork. The resulting civil war in Poland, involving Russia, lasted from 1768 to 1772.

== Mikhail Volkonsky (1769–1771) ==
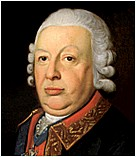
Mikhail Volkonsky.

For his failure in preventing the formation of Bar Confederation, Repnin was dismissed. On 22 May 1769 he was replaced by the envoy and minister Prince Mikhail Volkonsky, a high-ranking officer in the Russian Army who had been stationed in Poland since 1761. Volkonsky's orders were even more direct; in 1770 he demanded that the Czartoryski family be exiled from the Commonwealth, and when King Poniatowski asked what authority the ambassador had to demand the punishment of foreign citizens, he threatened the king with the reporting of his opposition to the Russian court.

== Caspar von Saldern (1771–1772) ==
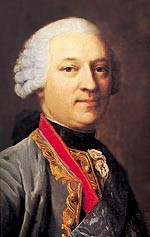
Caspar von Saldern.

Caspar von Saldern, protégé of Nikita Ivanovich Panin, and former diplomat of Holstein, became the next ambassador in April 1771. His service was marked by a significant change in Russian policy. An attempt by the Bar Confederates to kidnap king Poniatowski on 3 November 1771, in Warsaw, sent a signal that Poniatowski's position was weak and Poland had not been entirely turned into a Russian protectorate. In order to protect some of its gains, and with the approval and encouragement of Prussia and Austria-Hungary, Catherine II started to consider the first partition of Poland. Saldern's given task was to convince the king and the Czartoryski family to support militarily Russia's crushing of the confederates. They all refused. He fell into disfavor with Catherine, and after he was excluded from the negotiations related to the first partition of Poland, he asked for his own dismissal.

== Otto Magnus von Stackelberg (1772–1790) ==
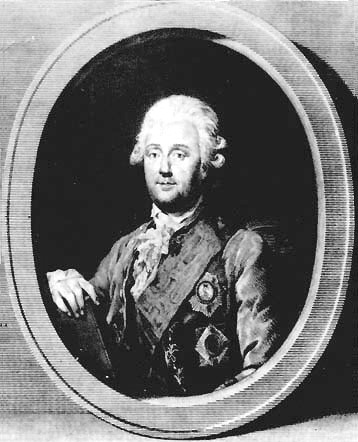
Otto Magnus von Stackelberg

After the treaty of the First Partition, signed in February, was made public on 5 August 1772, Otto Magnus von Stackelberg became the new ambassador. His task was to ensure that the Polish Sejm would ratify the treaty. The Partition Sejm, with many of its deputies bribed by the Russian embassy, indeed ratified the treaty (on 30 September 1773), and established the Permanent Council – a small body that both promised to reform the inefficient Polish governance which, Stackelberg thought, could also be easily controlled by Russia.

In 1776, Stackelberg permitted King Poniatowski to carry out several minor reforms, but in 1780 von Stackelberg's protest resulted in the derailing of Zamoyski's Codex, a proposed set of reforms drafted by kanclerz Andrzej Zamoyski which would have strengthened royal power, made all officials answerable to the Sejm, placed the clergy and their finances under state supervision, and deprived landless szlachta ("barefoot szlachta") of many of their legal immunities. Russia did not want a completely governmentless Poland, as was seen in their support for the Permanent Council, yet the Zamoyski Codex, which offered a chance for the significant reform of the Polish governance, was also not friendly to Russia. Stackelberg also opposed most reforms proposed by Poniatowski from 1778 to 1786.

On 27 May 1787, he derailed yet another Polish policy which seemed threatening to Russia. With few major wars in the past decades, the economy of the Commonwealth was improving, and its budget had a notable surplus. Many voices said that the money should be spent on increasing the size, and providing new equipment for, the Polish army. However, as a large Polish army could be a threat to the Russian garrisons controlling Poland, von Stackelberg ordered his proxies in the Permanent Council to spend the money on a different goal: for the huge sum of 1 million zlotys (representing most of the surplus), the Council bought the von Brühl's Palace – and promptly donated it to 'Poland's ally', Russia, to serve as Russia's new embassy.

Nonetheless, von Stackelberg, and the entire Russian control over Poland, was soon to suffer a major defeat. With Russian attention being diverted to the Russo-Turkish War (1787–1792) and the Russo-Swedish War (1788–1790), Catherine approved some limited reforms in Poland, with the goal of transforming Poland into a more useful (and efficient) ally. However, when the opportunity for major reform presented itself during the "Great" or "Four-Year Sejm" of 1788–1792, which opened on 6 October 1788, and from 1790—a new alliance between the Polish–Lithuanian Commonwealth and Prussia seemed to provide even further security against Russian intervention, the Polish reformers managed to carry out increasing numbers of reform despite Stackelberg's opposition.

== Yakov Bulgakov (1790–1792) ==
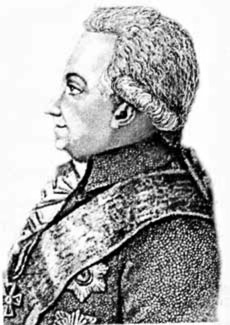
Yakov Bulgakov.

The Polish–Prussian alliance angered Catherine II, who recalled von Stackelberg and replaced him with Yakov Bulgakov. This, however, changed little: Russia was still occupied with the Ottomans, and the Prussians played their own game, further giving Catherine a pause before ordering any intervention. Bulgakov was further outmaneuvered by the Polish reformers when King Stanisław August drew closer to leaders of the reform-minded Patriotic Party (Stanisław Małachowski, Ignacy Potocki, Hugo Kołłątaj, Stanisław Staszic and others). Finally the reformers pulled a quasi-coup d'etat, voting for a new constitution, the Constitution of May 3, 1791, when most of the pro-Russian deputies (Muscovite Party) were away for the Easter recess. The Constitution which drastically reformed the Commonwealth coincided with the end of the Russo-Turkish war. The members of the Muscovite Party, who felt secure with the previous status quo and under Russian protection, formed the Targowica Confederation, and requested Catherine II to intervene to restore their freedoms. A month after the Constitution was signed Bulgakov informed the Polish king that Russian forces were responding to their request and entering Poland in order to 'restore order' - although in fact they were there to abolish the constitution which threatened the Russian control over Poland. The Prussians were also appalled at the possibility of strong constitutional monarchy at their border. Poland forces, numerically inferior to Russians (at about 1:3), were eventually defeated in the War in Defense of the Constitution. The Constitution was abolished, and the Second Partition of Poland took place.

== Jacob Sievers (1793) ==
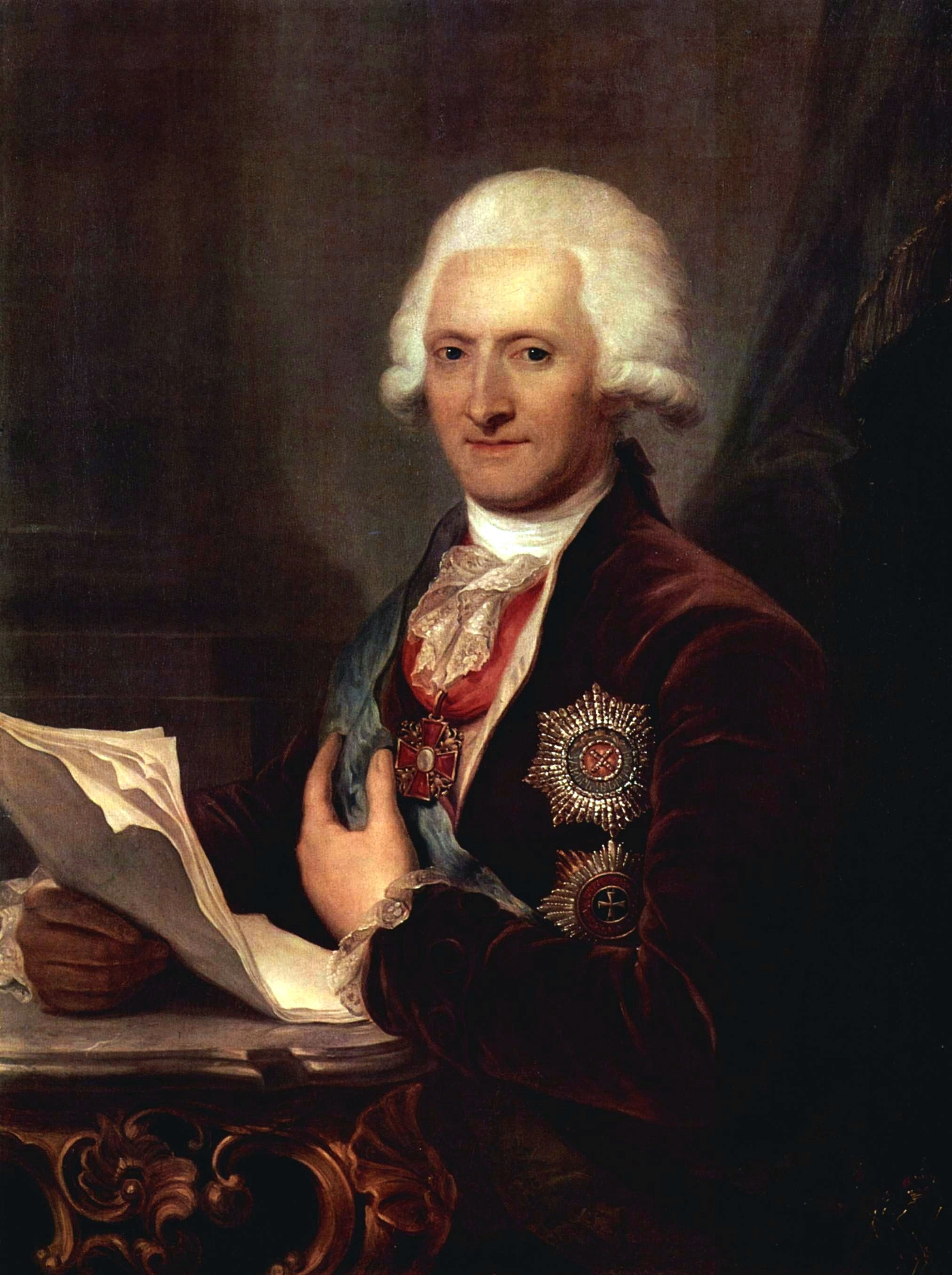
Jacob Sievers.

On 16 February 1793 Bulgakov was replaced by Jacob Sievers, envoy and minister. His orders were to ensure the ratification of the treaty of the Second Partition. Russian representatives bribed some deputies and the Russian army's presence influenced the election of their favoured candidates at local sejmiks.

At the Grodno Sejm, the last Sejm of the Commonwealth, any deputies who opposed the Russian presence or demands were threatened with beatings, arrests, sequestration or exile. Many deputies were not allowed to speak, and the main issue on the agenda was the project of 'Eternal Alliance of Poland and Russia', sent to the Sejm by Russian Tsarina Catherine the Great, and presented to the Sejm as the 'request of Polish people' by the Polish supporters of Russia. Eventually with all the deputies cowed into agreement by Russian soldiers present in the chamber, and with none willing to speak out against the treaty, the Second Partition was declared to have passed by unanimous vote.

== Iosif Igelström (1793–1794) ==
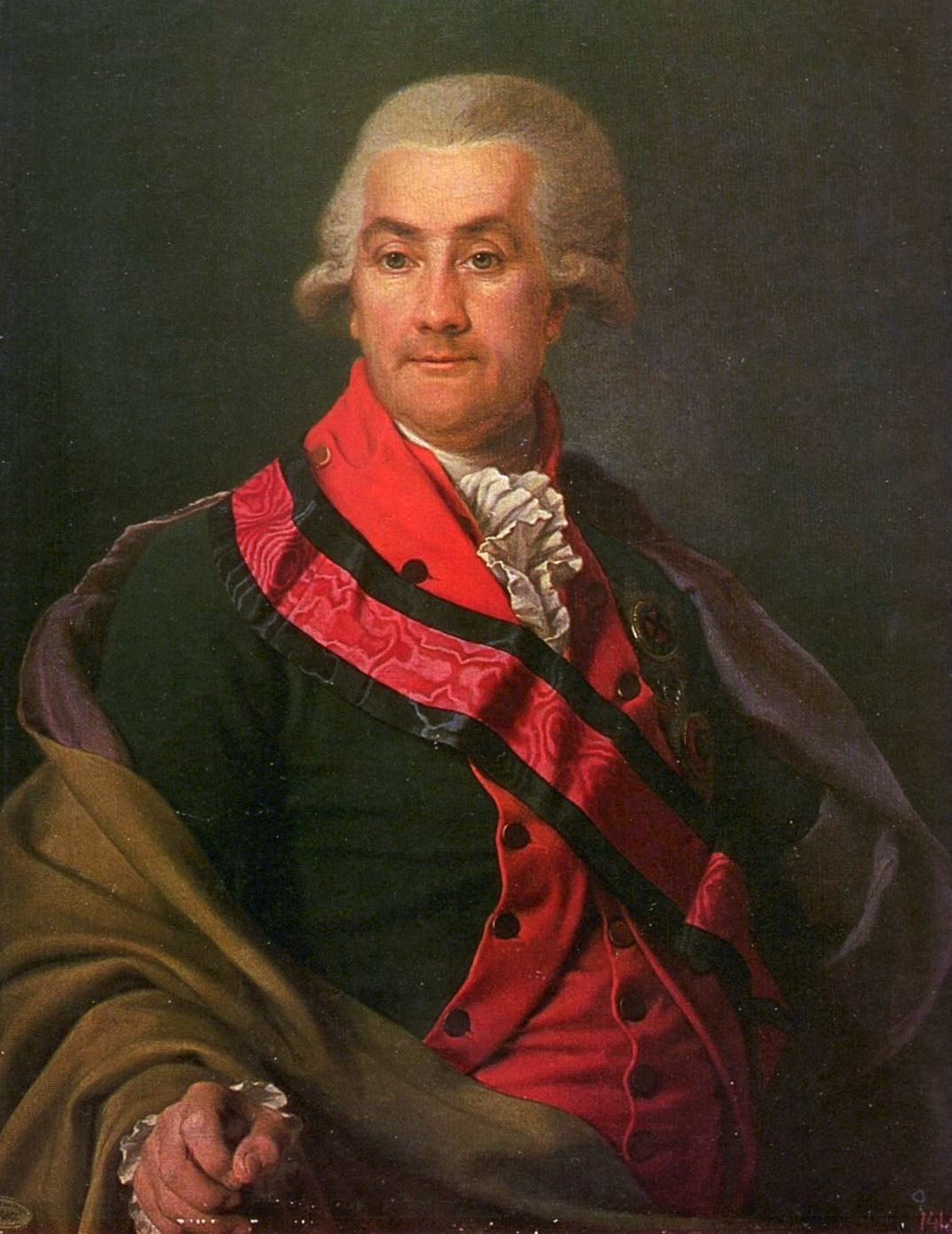
Iosif Igelström

In December 1793 Sievers was replaced by the last Russian envoy and ambassador, Iosif Igelström (German: Otto Heinrich Igelström), who already from late 1792 was the commander-in-chief of the Russian forces in Poland. His main goal was to ensure the demobilization of most of the Commonwealth army; however he was interrupted by the Kościuszko Uprising which started in March 1794 - first in the series of several uprisings against the partitioners of Poland that would shake Poland over the next century. In April 1794 during the Warsaw Uprising Russian garrisons, commanded by Igelström, sustained heavy losses. The Russian embassy had a special fund, Jurgielt, from which hundreds of Polish politicians and officials were receiving a stable yearly pension. During the Uprising, the Russian embassy was captured, and among the captured documents were the lists of various Polish officials on the Russian payroll; many of them—including several prominent leaders of the Targowica Confederation—were later executed. For his failure to prevent the uprising Igelström was demoted; nonetheless, after the Kościuszko Uprising, the Third Partition of Poland resulted in the complete destruction of the Polish–Lithuanian Commonwealth. Most of its territories were partitioned among its neighbors, and the new incarnation of Poland, Congress Poland, was an obvious Russian puppet state. Therefore, Russian diplomacy, backed by the military might of the Empire, and despite a few setbacks like the Bar Confederation, the Constitution of May 3, 1791 and the Kościuszko Uprising had achieved its goal, expanding Russian control over most of the Commonwealth territory and population.

== List of Russian ambassadors and envoys to Poland, 1763–1794 ==
- Herman Karl von Keyserling, envoy extraordinary (poseł nadzwyczajny) and minister plenipotentiary (minister pełnomocny) 1763–30 September 1764
- Nicholas Repnin, envoy extraordinary and minister plenipotentiary 1764–1768
- Mikhail Volkonsky, envoy extraordinary and minister plenipotentiary 22 May 1769 – 1771
- Caspar von Saldern, ambassador from April 1771 to August 1772
- Otto Magnus von Stackelberg, ambassador from 1772 to 1790
- Yakov Bulgakov, envoy extraordinary and minister plenipotentiary 1790–1792
- Jacob Sievers, envoy extraordinary and minister plenipotentiary from 16 February to 28 December 1793
- Iosif Igelström, envoy extraordinary and minister plenipotentiary 1793 to spring of 1794

== Notes ==
- a The only time the power of Russian diplomats was challenged and (temporarily) severely curtailed in that period was the time after the reforms of the Great Sejm (from 1790, especially with the implementation of the Constitution of May 3, 1791) to the Polish defeat in the Polish–Russian War of 1792, and to a lesser extent, during the time of Kościuszko Uprising (1794).
