= Rejtan (painting) =

Painting by Jan Matejko

Rejtan, or the Fall of Poland
- Rejtan – upadek Polski (Polish)
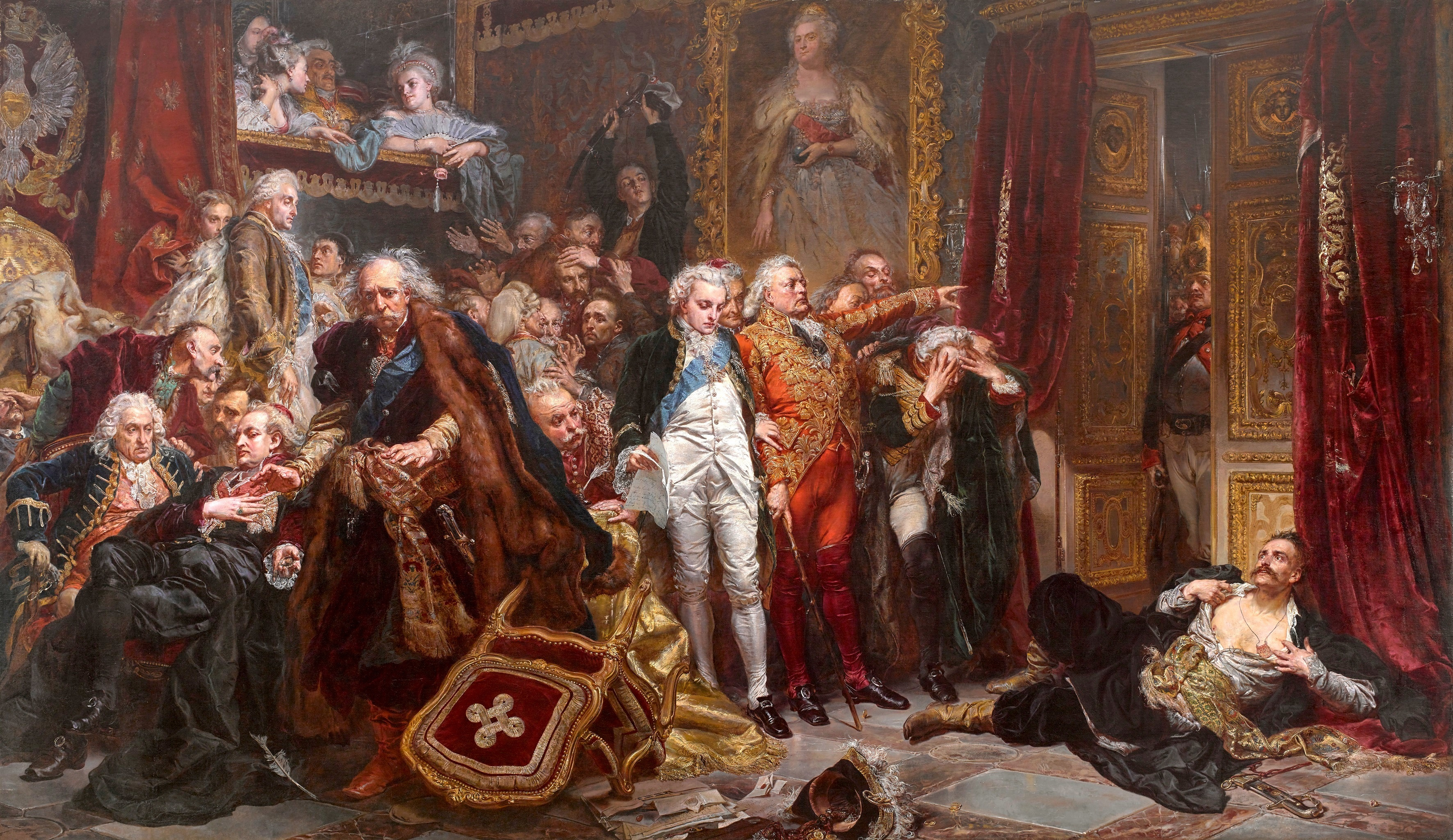
- Artist: Jan Matejko
- Year: 1866
- Medium: Oil on canvas
- Dimensions: 282 cm × 487 cm (111 in × 192 in)
- Location: Royal Castle in Warsaw

Rejtan, or the Fall of Poland (Polish: Rejtan. Upadek Polski) is an oil painting by the Polish artist Jan Matejko, finished in 1866, depicting the protest of Tadeusz Rejtan (lower right) against the First Partition of Poland during the Partition Sejm of 1773. Tadeusz Rejtan was a member of the Polish–Lithuanian Commonwealth's Sejm, known for his opposition to the First Partition of Poland in 1773 by physically trying to prevent delegates from leaving the chamber to stop the ratification of the partition. The Sejm was heavily influenced by foreign powers, with delegates being bribed or threatened, while Russia, Prussia, and Austria justified their annexation of Polish territory as a response to the internal conflicts of the Bar Confederation.

Jan Matejko's composition depicts the scene in the manner of academic history painting, placing Rejtan in a central position with a dramatic gesture, surrounded by figures who appear complicit with the foreign demands, including members of the future Targowica Confederation and Russian ambassador Nicholas Repnin. Despite causing controversy and receiving mixed reviews at the time of its initial display to the public in 1866, Matejko's work was later recognized for its cultural significance in Poland, depicting themes of political resistance and critique. Emperor Franz Joseph I of Austria subsequently acquired the painting, which was displayed in Vienna until 1920.

The Polish government bought the work in 1920, and since 1931, except for a brief period during World War II when it was looted by the Germans, it has been on public display at the Royal Castle in Warsaw. Both a depiction of a historical moment, and an allegory for the surrounding period of Polish history, the painting is one of Matejko's most famous works, and an iconic representation of an emotional protest.

== Historical context ==
Tadeusz Rejtan was a deputy in the Sejm of the Polish–Lithuanian Commonwealth in 1773, infamously known as the Partition Sejm. The Sejm convened to review the demands of the Commonwealth's three neighbours (the Russian Empire, Prussia and the Archduchy of Austria) in order to legalize their territorial demands, known as the First Partition of Poland. The Sejm operated under duress, with the immediate threat of foreign forces present in the Commonwealth, and with a significant number of deputies either bribed or threatened by foreign diplomats. The three powers officially justified their actions as a compensation for dealing with a troublesome neighbor and restoring order through military intervention in the civil war (the War of Bar Confederation); in fact all three were interested in territorial gains.

On 21 April that year, Rejtan, in a dramatic gesture at the Sejm, is said to have bared his chest and laid himself down in a doorway, blocking the way with his own body in a dramatic attempt to stop the other members from leaving the chamber where the debate was being held. Leaving the chamber would signify an end to the discussion, and the acceptance of the motion under discussion, i.e., to accept the foreign territorial demands.

== Description ==
The painting portrays this scene, although as usual with Matejko's work, it sacrifices some historical reality for more dramatic presentation. It serves as an allegory for all three Partitions of Poland (1772, 1793, 1795) and portrays a number of major historical figures of this era. Rejtan is the most visible, occupying the entire right side of the painting, in the midst of his dramatic pose which has been compared to Liberty Leading the People. His position on this painting exemplifies the golden ratio.

To his left, in the center, are the "traitors", many of them on the Russian payroll, and future members of the Targowica Confederation. Adam Poniński, marshal of the Sejm, pointing in red court dress, either demands that Rejtan leaves or points to the armed Russian guards outside the door; he holds a simple wooden walking stick instead of a more elaborate marshall's staff, which Rejtan stole a day earlier. Behind him are bishop Ignacy Massalski and Prince Antoni Stanisław Czetwertyński-Światopełk. To his right, Hetman Franciszek Ksawery Branicki hides his face in his hands; which likely was Matejko's solution for a prosaic problem—he probably did not have access to a likeness of Branicki. Szczęsny Potocki, with the blue sash, looks to the ground, embarrassed. Behind the overturned chair, his father, Franciszek Salezy Potocki, also embarrassed, drops a quill pen and looks away. Between the two Potockis Jacek Małachowski is engaged in discussion with Samuel Korsak, while Karol Radziwiłł simply observes the situation, amused. On the ground, turned over, lies an armchair, with Branicki's hat and a coin purse, from which the coins spill towards Poniński, alluding to the real reason he is intent on concluding the debate.

To the left of the elder Potocki, the seated primate of Poland, Michał Jerzy Poniatowski, is engaged in a conversation with the chancellor Michał Fryderyk Czartoryski, both ignoring the disruption. Behind them in the blue waistcoat, King Stanisław August Poniatowski, annoyed, stands up from the throne, wanting to leave, and looking at his pocket watch.

From the gallery, the scene is observed by one of the main architects of the partitions, Russian ambassador Nicholas Repnin. He is seated between two ladies, likely Izabela Lubomirska and either Elżbieta Grabowska or Izabela Czartoryska. To his right, another important symbol is shown in the painting of Catherine II of Russia. Finally, in the open doors, behind Rejtan, stands a Russian soldier (although in reality the Sejm was "guarded" not by Russian, but by Prussian troops).

The only person clearly sympathetic to Rejtan is a young man in the middle of the room, holding in his hands a saber and a rogatywka, symbolizing the supporters of the anti-Russian Bar Confederation, and future insurgents from the Polish Uprisings in the Russian partition.

== Reception and analysis ==
Matejko began work on this painting in August 1864 and finished it in November 1866. It was one of many paintings portraying key historical moments in the history of Poland that he would create over his life. Matejko however did not simply illustrate the history, he intended his paintings to have powerful educational and emotional values.

The work caused a scandal in contemporary, still-partitioned Poland; it was discussed even before its unveiling. It offended a number of society figures, many tracing direct lineage to the major magnate families whose members are portrayed in the painting as traitors to the Polish cause. There were a number of critical reviews of the work in the contemporary press, Matejko received anonymous threats, and some aristocrats are said to have considered buying the painting only to destroy it. Some accused him of defeatism, pessimism, exploiting public sentiment over a historical scandal for contemporary publicity; it was thus criticized by notable artists such as Józef Ignacy Kraszewski and Cyprian Norwid. In Paris, a French-Polish aristocrat, Count Alexandre Joseph Colonna-Walewski, campaigned against including it in an exhibition. The painting, however, quickly garnered supporters, who in turn reproduced modified copies of it, replacing historical figures with major contemporary critics. Responding to the public outcry, Matejko painted a response—a painting titled Judgement on Matejko (Wyrok na Matejkę, 1867), in which he portrayed his execution by some of his most vocal critics.

Serious art critics had less emotional, but also mixed, opinions of the work. It was received less favourably by Józef Szujski and Stanisław Tarnowski, but praised by painters Henryk Siemiradzki and Artur Grottger. Comments of Wojciech Korneli Stattler are interpreted by different authors as either praise, or critique. In Paris, displayed at Exposition Universelle, 1867 the painting received a gold medal. While in Poland the painting's context and message was clearly understood, the work, displayed in Paris, proved to be too obscure for the audience there, with few understanding the complex, historical context; some French critics interpreted it as a painting of a gambling hall. It is said, however, to have been well understood by the Russian visitors to the French gallery, some of whom are said to have been interested in acquiring the painting, which was commended by Poles as "they bought the real ones, might as well buy the painted ones, too". Eventually, however, the painting was acquired by Emperor Franz Joseph I of Austria for 50,000 franks. It was shown at a gallery in Vienna, and eventually ended up at the Hofmuseum. Thanks to the efforts of minister Juliusz Twardowski it was purchased by the government of the Second Polish Republic in 1920. As part of the Wawel Royal Castle National Art Collection it has been on a public display in the Royal Castle in Warsaw since 1931, with the exception of the period of World War II, when it was briefly looted by the Nazis.

The painting is usually interpreted as criticism of the Russian interference in Polish political affairs, and the collaboration of treasonous Polish aristocrats. By the end of World War I it was already seen as a priceless artifact of Polish culture. The painting was positively interpreted in communist Poland as a symbol of critique of the Polish nobility, blamed for their selfishness leading to the partitions. More recently, the painting has been interpreted as the symbol of solitary protest, and a moral justification of dissent, even when such a protest is known to be futile, ignored by most. It has also been described as an iconic picture of an emotional protest and a symbol of desperate, patriotic protest. In the 1980s the painting inspired a protest song by Jacek Kaczmarski. Over time, the painting has become famous in Poland; Walter M. Cummins notes that the scene from this work was "made familiar to every Polish child by [this] frequently reproduced painting".
