= Tadeusz Rejtan =

18th-century noble from Polish-Lithuanian Commonwealth

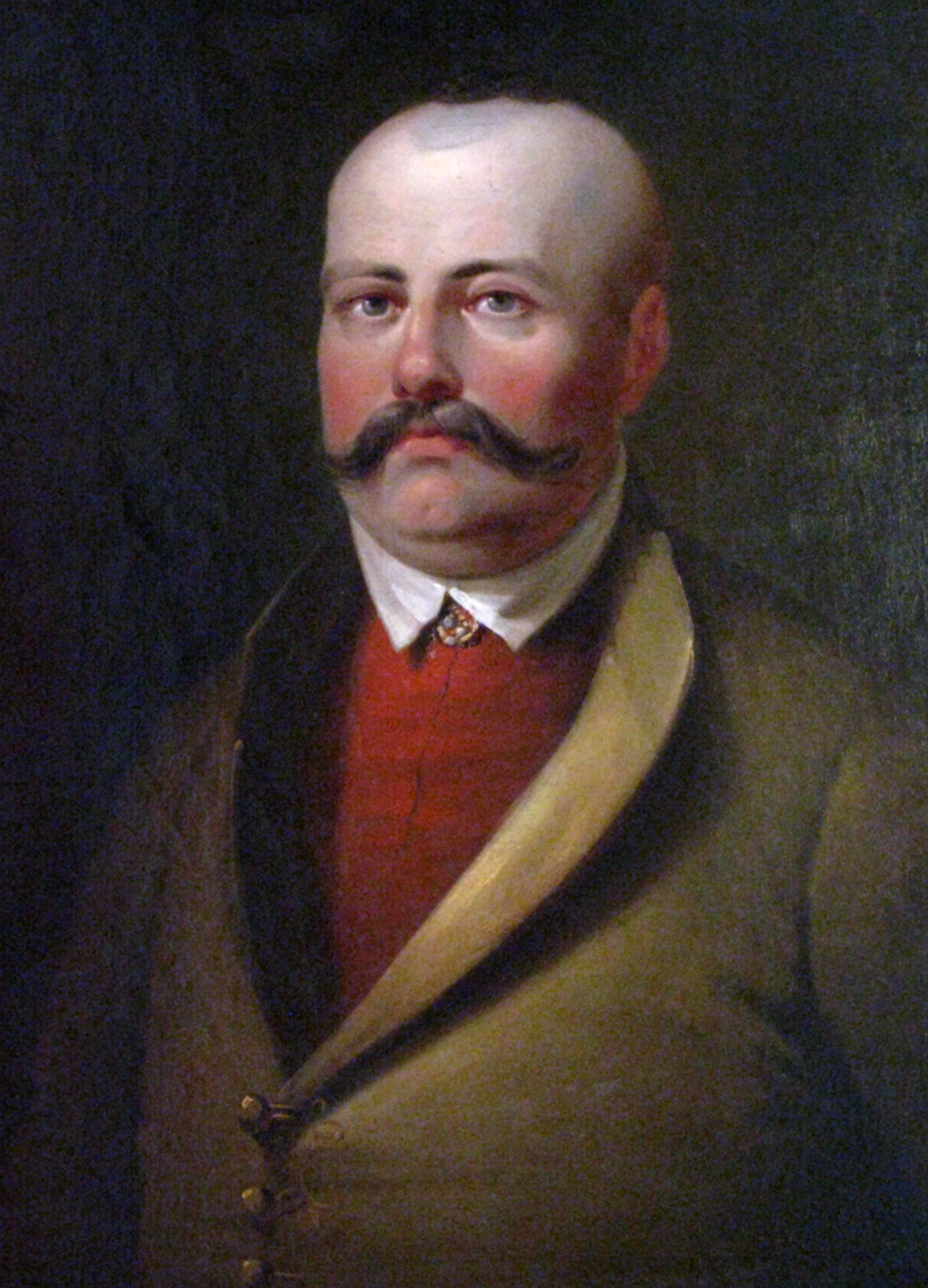
- Tadeusz Rejtan, anonymous painting
- Coat of arms: Rejtan
- Born: 20 August 1742; Hruszówka
- Died: 8 August 1780 (aged 37); Hruszówka
- Noble family: Rejtan (Reytan)
- Father: Dominik Rejtan
- Mother: Teresa Wołodkowicz
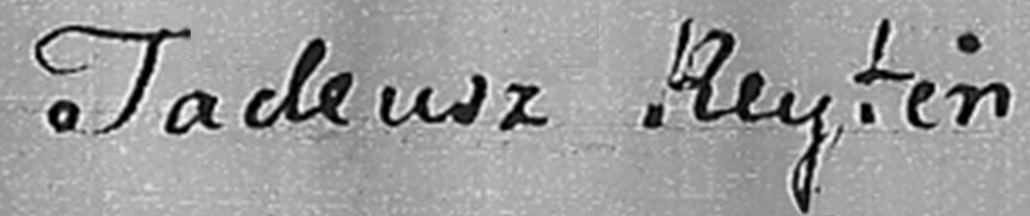
- Signature

Tadeusz Reytan (surname also alternatively spelled as Rejtan, and rarely Reyten; Belarusian: Тадэвуш Рэйтан; Lithuanian: Tadas Reitanas; 20 August 1742 – 8 August 1780) was a nobleman from the Polish–Lithuanian Commonwealth. He was a member of the Sejm of the Polish–Lithuanian Commonwealth from the Nowogródek Voivodeship. Reytan is remembered for a dramatic gesture he made in September 1773, as a deputy of the Partition Sejm. There, Reytan tried to prevent the legalization of the first partition of Poland, a scene that has been immortalized in the painting Rejtan by Jan Matejko. He has been the subject of many other art works, and is a symbol of patriotism in Poland, Lithuania and Belarus. Despite his efforts, the partition of Polish–Lithuanian Commonwealth was legalized soon afterwards.

== Biography ==
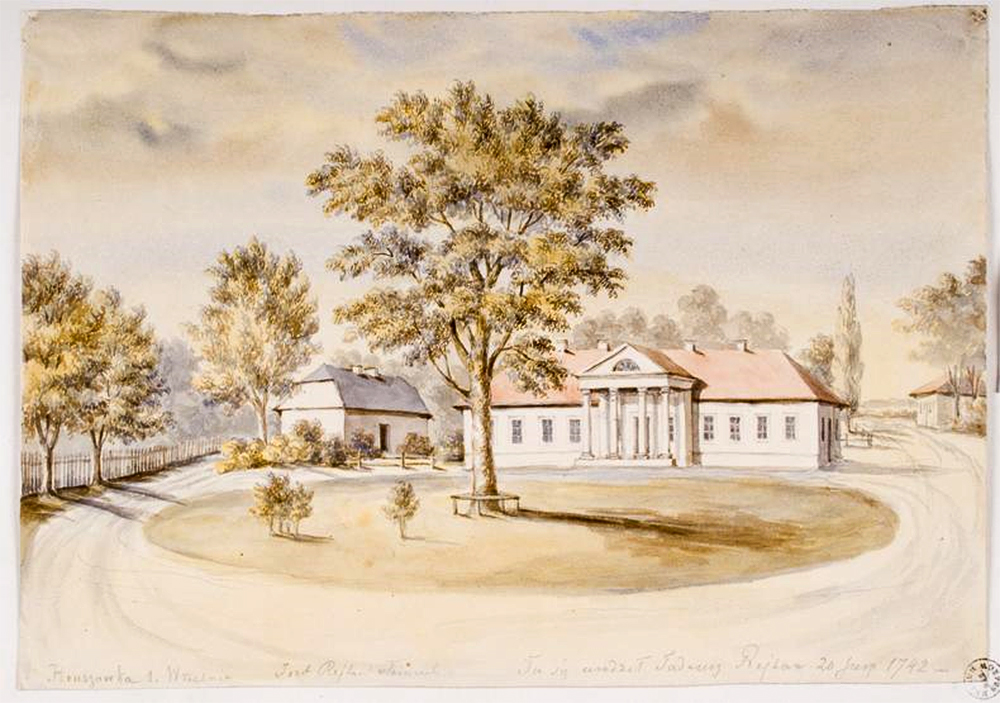
Reytan family manor in Hruszówka by Napoleon Orda

Tadeusz Rejtan was born on 20 August 1742 in Hruszówka (now Lyakhavichy District, Brest Region of Belarus). The date is as given in the Polish Biographical Dictionary, some other sources give other dates. He was the son of a minor, but relatively wealthy noble, Dominik Rejtan, podkomorzy of Novogrudok and Teresa Wołodkowicz. He was likely the oldest of five brothers. His brother, Michał, would come to hold the position of pisarz (scribe) of Nowogródek. His grandfather, also named Michał, was the skarbnik (treasurer) of Mazyr. The family had been aligned to the powerful Radziwiłł family, and Tadeusz would also pledge his allegiance to them.

Afterwards, he served in the Grand Ducal Lithuanian Army in a cavalry banner. He might have participated in the Bar Confederation (1768–1772), but historians are not certain about the validity of that claim.

In 1773, in the Bar Confederation's aftermath, a special session of the Polish–Lithuanian Sejm was convened in Warsaw, capital of the Polish–Lithuanian Commonwealth, by its three neighbours (Russian Empire, Prussia and Austria) in order to legalize their First Partition of Poland. That Sejm became known as the Partition Sejm. Rejtan was one of the deputies that tried to prevent the first partition's legalization, despite threats from the foreign ambassadors. For example, Russian ambassador Otto von Stackelberg declared that in the face of refusal the whole capital of Warsaw would be destroyed by the Russians; other threats included executions, confiscation of estates, and increase of partitioned territory.

Rejtan was a deputy to that Sejm, from the constituency of Novogrudok, and the local sejmik gave him very explicit instructions to defend the Commonwealth. On the Sejm's first day (19 April), and possibly even in the discussions on the previous days, Rejtan, working together with the Stanisław Bohuszewicz and Samuel Korsak, strongly protested against the proposal of Adam Poniński who wanted to form a confederated sejm (such as sejm would be immune to the threat of liberum veto). Rejtan's arguments were primarily legal; he argued that Poniński had no right to be the Marshal of the Sejm, and that there are no grounds to form a confederated sejm. He also appropriated one of the two Marshal's staffs. During a discussion with another deputy, Rejtan stated that he was aware that the foreign powers could force the issue, but his intention was to make it clear that any treaty they force through the Sejm would not be unanimously accepted. Rejtan was thus able to disrupt the proceedings on that day. He would attempt to delay and disrupt the proceedings, but he was ignored, overruled and threatened by other deputies, as on 20 April Poniński returned to the Sejm with an escort of Russian and Prussian soldiers. A quickly convened Sejm court begun deliberating on the potential illegality of Rejtan's actions, but little discussion occurred on that day.

The next day, the court sentenced him to imprisonment and confiscation of goods; that was challenged by Rejtan. Eventually, on 21 April, most of the deputies had signed the act of the confederation, which was accepted by the king. Troops made it difficult for the other deputies to be present in the Sejm chambers, although a dwindling number of deputies, including Rejtan, still were present. To finish forming the confederation and elect Poniński its marshal, some confederation deputies entered the Chambers, passed a motion, and were attempting to leave. This is when Rejtan, in a dramatic gesture, is said to have bared his chest and laid himself down in a doorway, blocking the way with his own body in a dramatic attempt to stop the other members from leaving the chamber where the debate was being held (leaving of the chamber signified the end of the discussion, and the acceptance of the motion). Others tried to block the passage too. Their gesture was dramatic but futile, as the leaving deputies just stepped over Rejtan, and in a commotion pushed through the others. Eventually, just a few deputies, including Rejtan, were left inside; they refused to leave, hoping to be removed by foreign troops, which would be a symbol of the foreign intervention. Around 22 April, Rejtan and the remaining colleagues left the Sejm chamber after about 36 hours of having little sleep and food (Rejtan is said to have refused to eat in the Sejm chamber, saying it would disrespect it). Eventually however, they left in return for a guarantee from the foreign diplomats that the sentence passed on him would be nullified, and no other repercussions would be carried out.

Nonetheless, Rejtan would face some difficulties, many orchestrated by Poniński, and had asked general Robert Scipio von Lentulus, commander of the Prussian garrison stationed in Warsaw, for an escort, which he received. Rejtan would remain in Warsaw during the next few years (the Partition Sejm lasted till 1776), but his influence diminished. He issued a print manifesto in December 1773, criticizing the current confederated sejm, and supportive of the Bar Confederation, but it received little publicity.

After the partition, Rejtan withdrew from political life. He never married. He spent the rest of his days in a small estate at Hruszówka, where he died on 8 August 1780. His mental health had deteriorated; according to some due to distress of the loss of a part of his homeland, but rumours about his erratic behavior date to soon after the Partition Sejm begun in 1773, before its final motions were passed in 1776. He is said to have been escorted by his brothers from Warsaw on 19 March 1775 after he had a fit, and was locked in a small family mansion which he would never leave up until his death. Eventually, he committed suicide, cutting himself with glass (most detailed accounts say he swallowed it, to prevent being taken by pursuing Russian soldiers). His exact place of burial is unknown, and exhumation in Hruszówka in 1930 failed to conclusively find his grave.

== Legacy ==
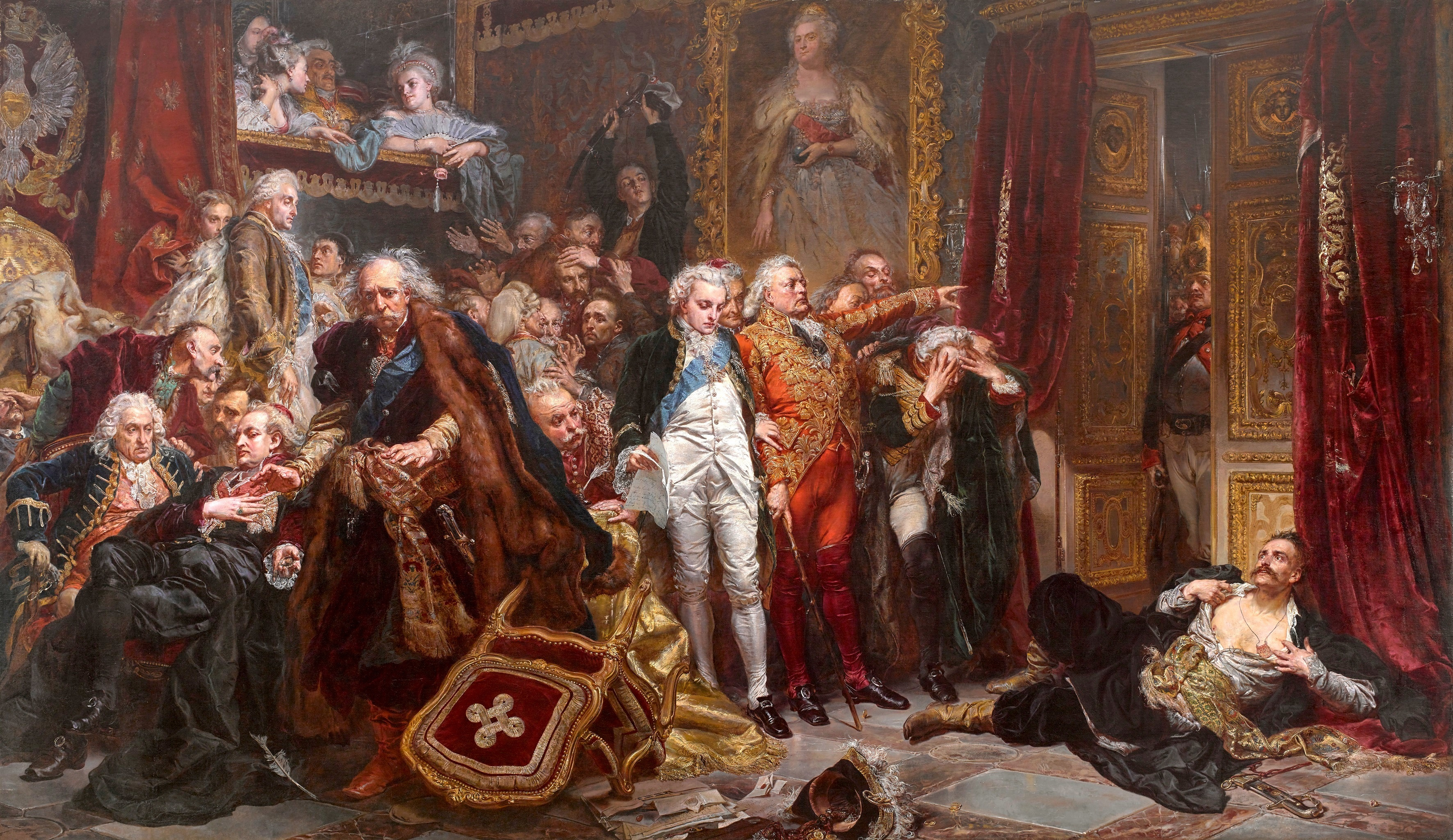
Matejko, Jan (1866), Rejtan – The Fall of Poland, Royal Castle in Warsaw. Rejtan visible on the right.

Rejtan's dramatic attempt to prevent the partition earned him lasting recognition in Poland, one that began even during the proceedings, as he was lauded by some other deputies. His action was also praised as patriotic and respectable by the Prussian and Russian military commanders in Warsaw, who offered him a military escort to protect him from some confederates (particularly Poniński was holding a grudge against him). Soon, brochures and newspaper articles spread the information about his patriotic gesture throughout Poland and abroad. During the Great Sejm of 1788–1792, a decree was passed, commending Rejtan, and deputies discussed a project to put a plaque to his name in the Sejm Chambers. His gesture in the Sejm was less famously repeated by Jan Suchorzewski during that period.

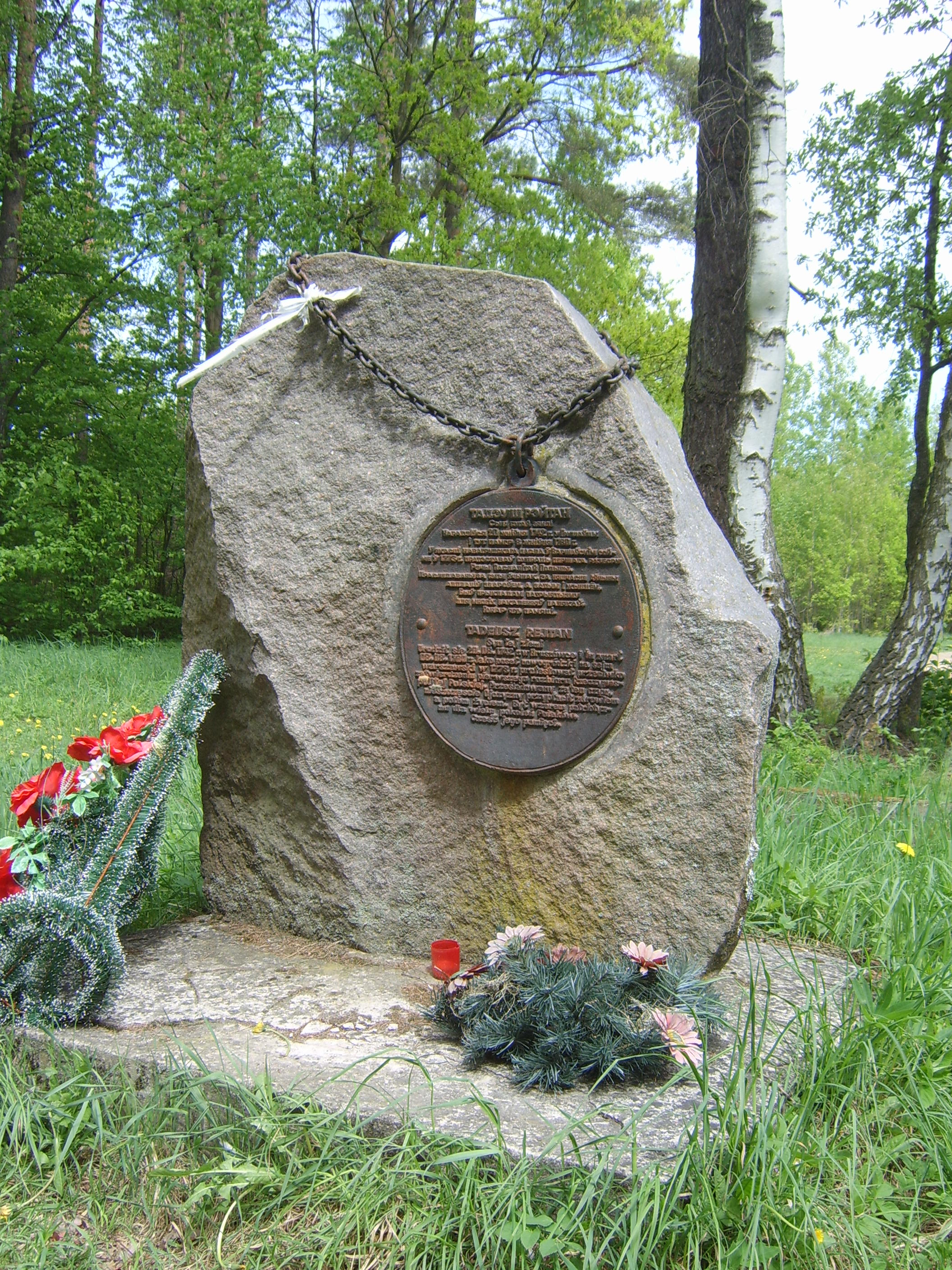
Stone in memory of Tadeusz Rejtan. Mausoleum Chapel, Hrushauka, Belarus

He was, and to the present day is, considered a shining example of a patriot. He has been the subject of many art works, poems, songs and books. Writers who mentioned him included Stanisław Staszic, Franciszek D. Kniaźnin, Adam Mickiewicz, Józef Szujski, Leon Wegner, Seweryn Goszczyński, Jan Lechoń, Artur Oppman, Seweryna Duchińska, Maria Konopnicka, Kazimierz Brończyk, Wiktor Woroszylski, Marian Brandys, and Jerzy Zawieyski. A bust of Rejtan was funded by his family in 1860, and is in the National Museum in Kraków. A small monument of him is said to have collapsed in Kraków in 1946, soon after World War II, and was not rebuilt until 2007. A medal with his face was issued in the Grand Duchy of Poznań in 1860. Several portraits of him exist, including one by Franciszek Smuglewicz. However, his most famous depiction is that by Jan Matejko, who showed a more fictionalized version of the events at the Partition Sejm in his 1866 painting, Rejtan na sejmie warszawskim 21 kwietnia 1773 – upadek Polski (Rejtan at the Warsaw Sejm of 21 April 1773 – the Fall Of Poland). Numerous schools, streets and military units in Poland bear his name as well.

== Notes ==
a Polish historian Jerzy Michalski in his 1988 entry on Rejtan in Polski Słownik Biograficzny notes that historian Wanda Konczyńska found some documents contradicting the extent of Rejtan's mental illness, and suggesting he might have taken part in some business transactions, but the evidence is not conclusive.
