= Suchecki =

Suchecki (feminine: Suchecka) is a Polish surname. Notable people with this surname include:

- Ignacy Suchecki (died 1803), Polish nobleman and military leader
- Jim Suchecki (1926–2000), Major League Baseball pitcher
- Zbigniew Suchecki (born 1984), Polish speedway rider
- Teresa Suchecka-Nowak (1926–2011), Polish World War II underground fighter
