= Giovanni Andrea Archetti =

Italian cardinal

His Eminence Giovanni Andrea Archetti
- Cardinal-Bishop of Sabina
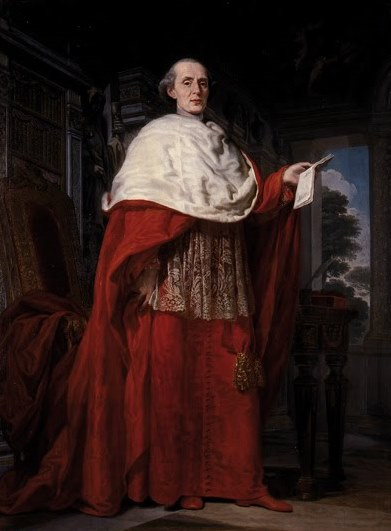
- Church: Catholic Church
- Diocese: Sabina
- Installed: 2 April 1800
- Term ended: 5 November 1805
- Predecessor: Giovanni Archinto
- Successor: Ippolito Antonio Vincenti Mareri
- Other post: Bishop of Ascoli Piceno
- Previous post: Cardinal-Priest of Sant'Eusebio (1784‍–‍1800)

Orders
- Created cardinal: 20 September 1784 by Pius VI

Personal details
- Born: 11 September 1731 Brescia, Republic of Venice
- Died: 5 November 1805 (aged 74) Ascoli, Papal States

Giovanni Andrea Archetti (11 September 1731 – 5 November 1805) was an Italian cardinal.

== Biography ==
Born in Brescia, Lombardy, Archetti studied canon and civil law in La Sapienza University of Rome. He was ordained priest on 10 September 1775, elected titular archbishop of Chalcedon (Calcedonia) on the next day, and named Apostolic nuncio in Poland on September 18, 1775. He was instrumental in opposition to the Zamoyski Code, which would have limited ecclesiastical law and brought most of its competencies under the jurisdiction of the civil legal code.

Archetti was made cardinal priest in the consistory of 20 September 1784 by Pope Pius VI, with the title of Sant'Eusebio and appointed apostolic legate in Bologna the following year. He was transferred to the see of Ascoli Piceno with personal title of archbishop on 1 June 1795. He took part in the Papal conclave of 1799/1800 in Venice. On 2 April 1800, he was named cardinal bishop of the suburbicarian diocese of Sabina, retaining the see of Ascoli Piceno.

He died in 1805 in Ascoli.

== Books and articles ==
- Archetti, Giovanni Andrea; Ivan Sergejevič Gagarin (1872). Un monce du pape à la cour de Catherine II (in French). Paris: V. Palmè.
