= Otto Magnus von Stackelberg (ambassador) =

Baltic-German diplomat of the Russian Empire

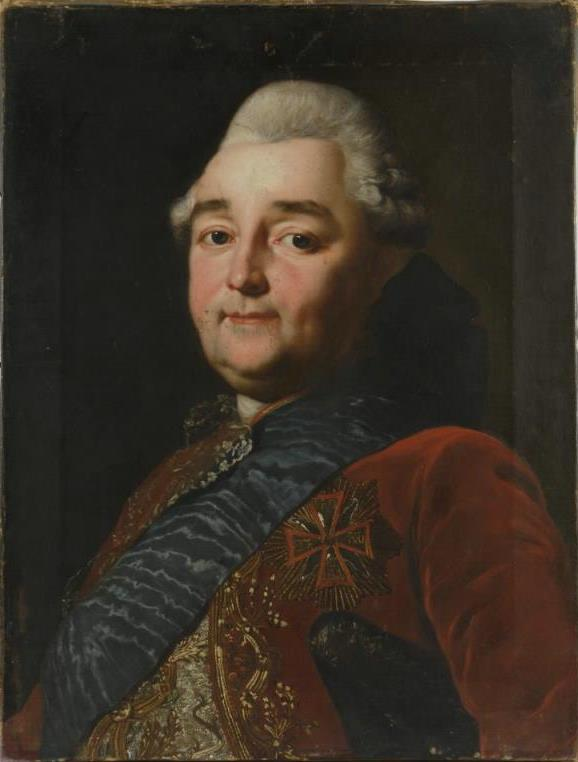
Portrait, 1780s

Coat of arms of Otto Magnus von Stackelberg (1736–1800)

Otto Magnus Reichsgraf von Stackelberg (1736–1800) was a diplomat of the Russian Empire. He served as an envoy in Madrid from 1767 to 1771, ambassador in the Polish–Lithuanian Commonwealth from 1772 to 1790 and in Sweden from 1791 to 1793.

== Biography ==
In his early career, he served as an envoy in Madrid from 1767 to 1771.

After the treaty of the First Partition of Poland, signed in February, was made public on 5 August 1772, Otto Magnus von Stackelberg became the new ambassador to Poland. During his stay in Warsaw, due to the Russian Empire's influence in the Commonwealth, he was almost the de facto ruler of Poland in the name of Empress Catherine II who became a protectress of this country. He governed Poland by Permanent Council, which became an instrument of Russian surveillance over the Commonwealth.

Stackleberg had enormous influence in the Commonwealth, according to many historians, equal or bypassing the king. He has been described as ruling the Commonwealth, from 1772 to 1788, as "a Roman proconsul". He often humiliated the king, for example, by inviting guests to the Royal Łazienki Palace without so much as even notifying the king of his plans.

His first task was to ensure that the Polish parliament (Sejm) would ratify the treaty. The Partition Sejm, with many of its deputies coerced or bribed by the Russian embassy, indeed ratified the treaty (on 30 September 1773), as well as established the Permanent Council – a small body that both promised to reform the inefficient Polish governance and which could be easily controlled by Russia. In 1773 King Stanisław August Poniatowski bestowed him Order of the White Eagle.

In 1776, Stackelberg permitted Polish King Stanisław August Poniatowski to carry out several minor reforms, but in 1780 von Stackelberg's protest resulted in the derailing of Zamoyski's Codex, a proposed set of reforms drafted by kanclerz Andrzej Zamoyski which would have strengthened royal power, made all officials answerable to the Sejm, placed the clergy and their finances under state supervision, and deprived landless szlachta ("barefoot szlachta") of many of their legal immunities. Russia did not want a completely governmentless Poland, as was seen in their support for the Permanent Council, yet the Zamoyski Codex, which offered a chance for the significant reform of the Polish governance, was not in Russia's interest; Russia wanted a weak buffer Poland on its borders – not a strong rival as two centuries before. For that reason Stackelberg also opposed most reforms proposed by Poniatowski from 1778 to 1786.

On 27 May 1787, he derailed yet another Polish policy which seemed threatening to Russia. With few major wars in the past decades, the economy of the Commonwealth was improving, and its budget had a notable surplus. Many voices said that the money should be spent on increasing the size, and providing new equipment for, the Polish army. However, as a large Polish army could be a threat to the Russian garrisons controlling Poland, von Stackelberg ordered his proxies in the Permanent Council to spend the money on a different goal: for the huge sum of 1 million zlotys (representing most of the surplus), the Council bought the von Brühl's Palace – and promptly donated it to 'Poland's ally', Russia, to serve as Russia's new embassy.

Nonetheless, von Stackelberg, and the entire Russian control over Poland, was soon to suffer a major defeat. With Russian attention being diverted to the Russo-Turkish War (1787–1792) and the Russo-Swedish War (1788–1790), Catherine approved some limited reforms in Poland, with the goal of transforming Poland into a more useful (and efficient) ally. However, when the opportunity for major reform presented itself during the "Great" or "Four-Year Sejm" of 1788–1792, which opened on 6 October 1788, and from 1790 — a new alliance between the Polish–Lithuanian Commonwealth and Prussia seemed to provide even further security against Russian intervention, the Polish reformers managed to carry out increasing numbers of reforms despite Stackelberg's opposition.

His failure to prevent those reforms was one of the reasons he was recalled by St. Petersburg and reassigned to Sweden, where he became the Russian ambassador from 1791 to 1793.

== See also ==
- Ambassadors and envoys from Russia to Poland (1763–1794)
