= Mikhail Volkonsky =

Russian general and statesman (1713–1788)

Mikhail Nikitich Volkonsky
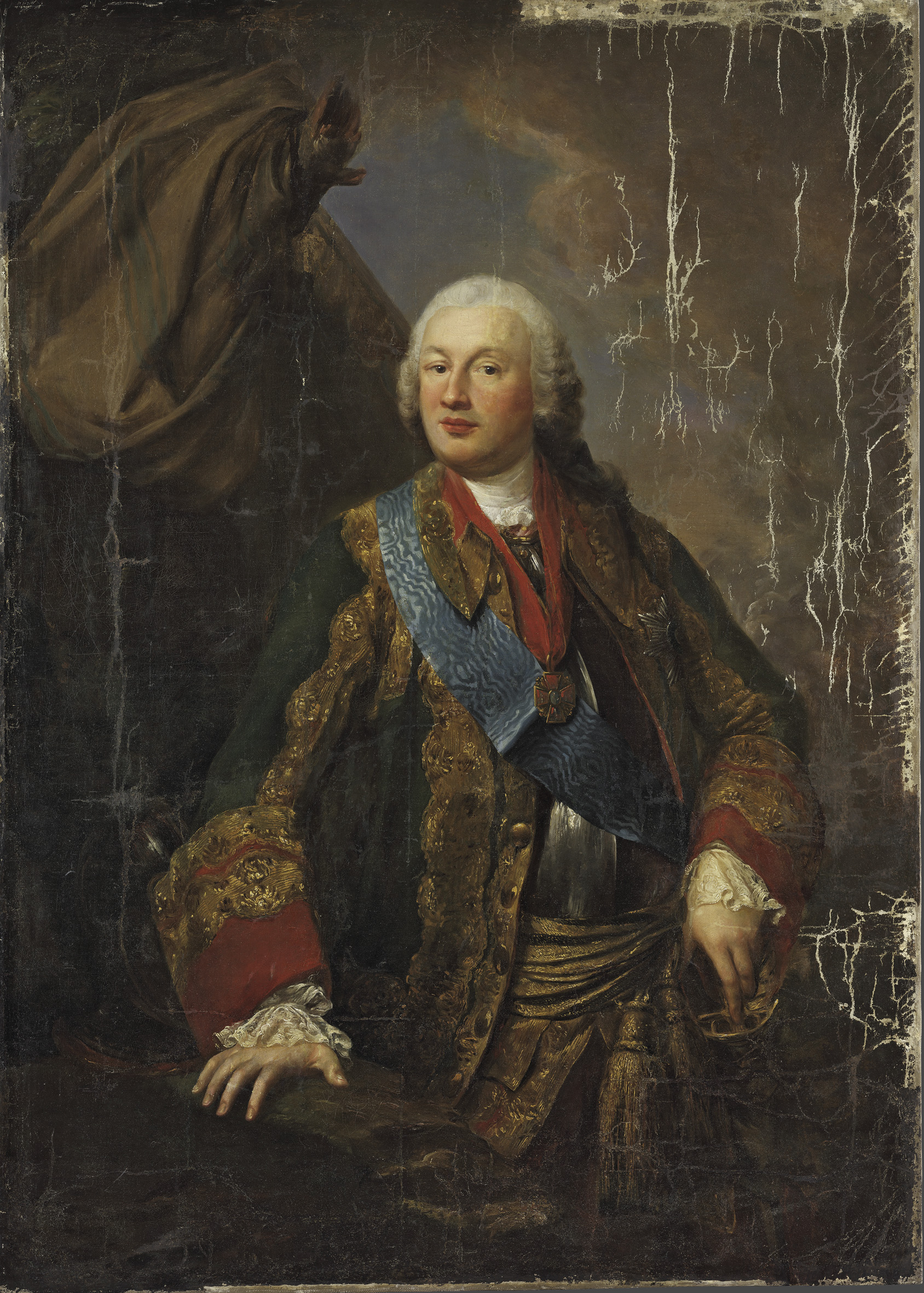

Commander-in-Chief in Moscow
- In office 1771–1780
- Preceded by: Grigory Orlov
- Succeeded by: Vasily Dolgorukov-Krymsky

Personal details
- Born: October 20, 1713 Moscow, Tsardom of Russia
- Died: December 19, 1788 (aged 75)
- Resting place: Pafnutyevo-Borovsky Monastery
- Parent: Nikita Volkonsky (father)
- Relatives: House of Volkonsky
- Awards: Order of the White Eagle; Order of Saint Andrew; Order of Saint Alexander Nevsky

Military service
- Rank: General-in-Chief

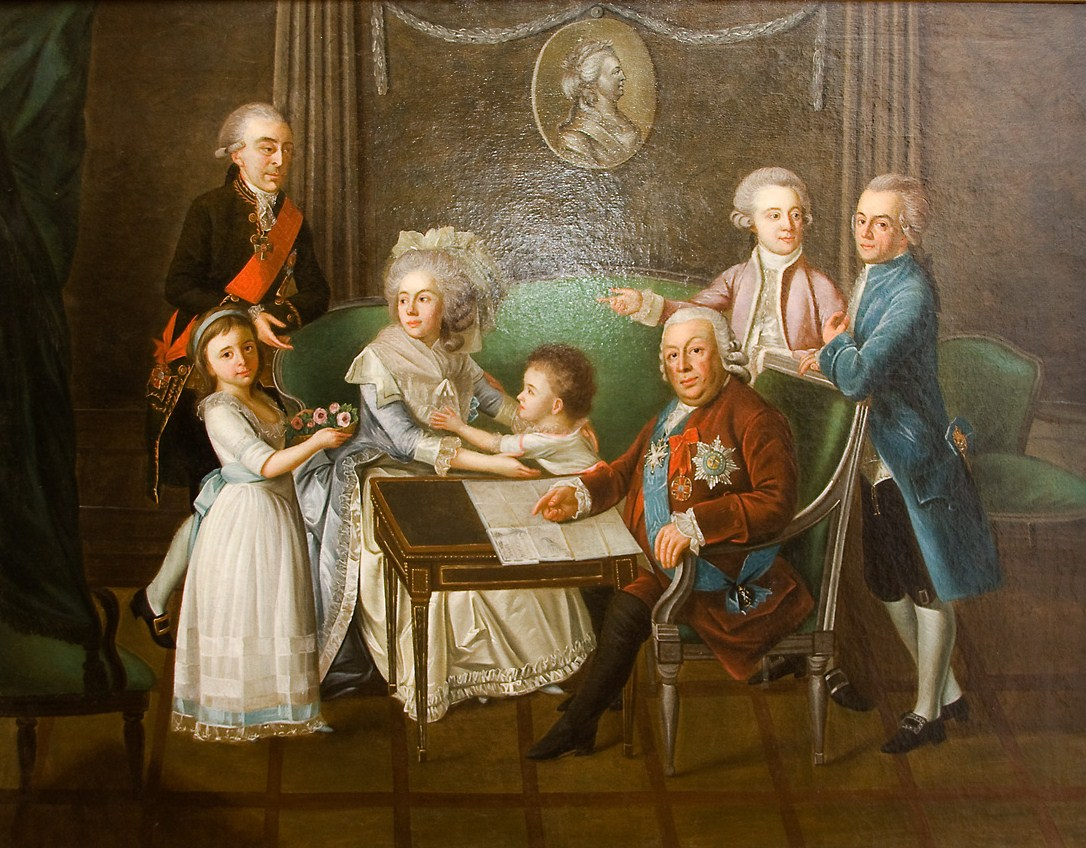
Prince Mikhail Nikitich Volkonsky with sons Leo and Pavel, with daughter Anna, her husband Alexander Prozorovsky, and granddaughters Elizabeth and Anna

Prince Mikhail Nikitich Volkonsky (October 20, 1713 – December 19, 1788) was a Russian statesman and military figure from the House of Volkonsky, General-in-Chief (1762), in 1771–1780 he was Commander-in-Chief in Moscow. The brother of General Alexei Volkonsky, uncle of Nastasya Ofrosimova.

== Biography ==
Born in the family of Prince Nikita Fedorovich Volkonsky and Agrafena Petrovna, née Bestuzheva, "in the old courtyard outside the Tver Gate near the Strastnov Monastery in the parish of the Church of the Nativity of the Virgin". In childhood, he lived with grandmother Catherine Ilyinichna, née Miloslavskaya. Since 1724 he was brought up by his grandfather Peter Bestuzhev-Ryumin in Courland.

In 1732 he was enrolled in the Land Gentry Corps founded by the empress, where he studied for 4 years. In 1738–1739 he fought with the Turks, in 1740 he accompanied Alexander Rumyantsev to negotiations in Constantinople. He met the Duke of Holstein (Peter III) when he first entered Russia within 1742.

Details of Volkonsky's service until 1756 are contained in a journal compiled by him, which was kept by his descendants, the princes Golitsyn–Prozorovsky. This valuable historical source was introduced into scientific circulation only in 2004.

Released from the cadet corps as a second lieutenant, in 1749 Volkonsky already bore the rank of colonel. Repeatedly traveled to Poland "for intelligence and secret negotiations with the tycoons". During the Seven Years' War, distinguished himself at Paltzig and Kunersdorf. He was promoted to lieutenant general on August 18, 1759. Two years later he was appointed commander of the troops stationed in Poland. In 1762, he signed an armistice with Prussia in Neumark.

On the day of the Palace Coup of 1762, the lieutenant colonel of the Life Guard Horse Regiment Volkonsky joined the number of supporters of Catherine, for which he received from her the Order of Saint Alexander Nevsky, the title of senator and the rank of General-in-Chief. In 1764 he commanded a corps in Poland, in 1767 he was awarded the Order of the Holy Apostle Andrew the First-Called. In 1769, the ambassador to the Commonwealth again.

After the Plague Riot in 1771, Mikhail Volkonsky was appointed Commander-in-Chief to Moscow. In 1773–1774, during the Pugachev's Rebellion, at the request of Volkonsky, significant military forces were pulled into Moscow (horse riders traveled to Lyubertsy), guns were put up at the governor's residence. In 1774, Volkonsky was one of the leaders of the general investigation of Yemelyan Pugachev and his main associates. In 1775 he organized in Moscow the famous amusements regarding the conclusion of peace with Turkey.

From his mother's brothers, Counts Mikhail Petrovich and Alexey Petrovich, Prince Volkonsky inherited significant land holdings. Having retired in 1780, he retired to his estates. He died on December 8, 1788, and was buried in the family tomb – Borovsky-Pafnutiev Monastery.

== Marriage and children ==
In January 1745, Mikhail Volkonsky married Elizabeth Alekseevna Makarova (1725–1782), the daughter of Alexey Makarov, cabinet minister of Peter the Great, and Praskovya Yuryevna Ladyzhenskaya. He took after her a dowry of 700 souls and a house in Saint Petersburg. In marriage were born:

- Alexander (1745–1748);
- Alexey (born and died in 1748);
- Anna (1749–1824), maid of honor, in September 1775 in the presence of the court and the Empress was engaged to Prince Peter Golitsyn, but in November 1775 he was killed in a duel. In 1780 she became the wife of Prince Alexander Prozorovsky. Since 1801, the state lady, since 1809, the cavalry lady of the Order of Saint Catherine of the First Class.
- Peter (1751–1754);
- Mary (1752–1765);
- Leo (1754–1792), the real chamberlain, was childless.
- Paul (1763–1808), chamberlain, childless.

Since the sons of Mikhail Nikitich did not leave offspring, his only heir was the daughter Anna and her descendants – the princes Golitsyn-Prozorovsky.

== Sources ==
- Sergey Kravets (2006). "Volkonsky". Great Russian Encyclopedia. Vol. 5. Moscow: Great Russian Encyclopedia. p. 637. ISBN 5852703346.
