= Partition Sejm =

Puppet Polish legislature created to legally enable the country's partition

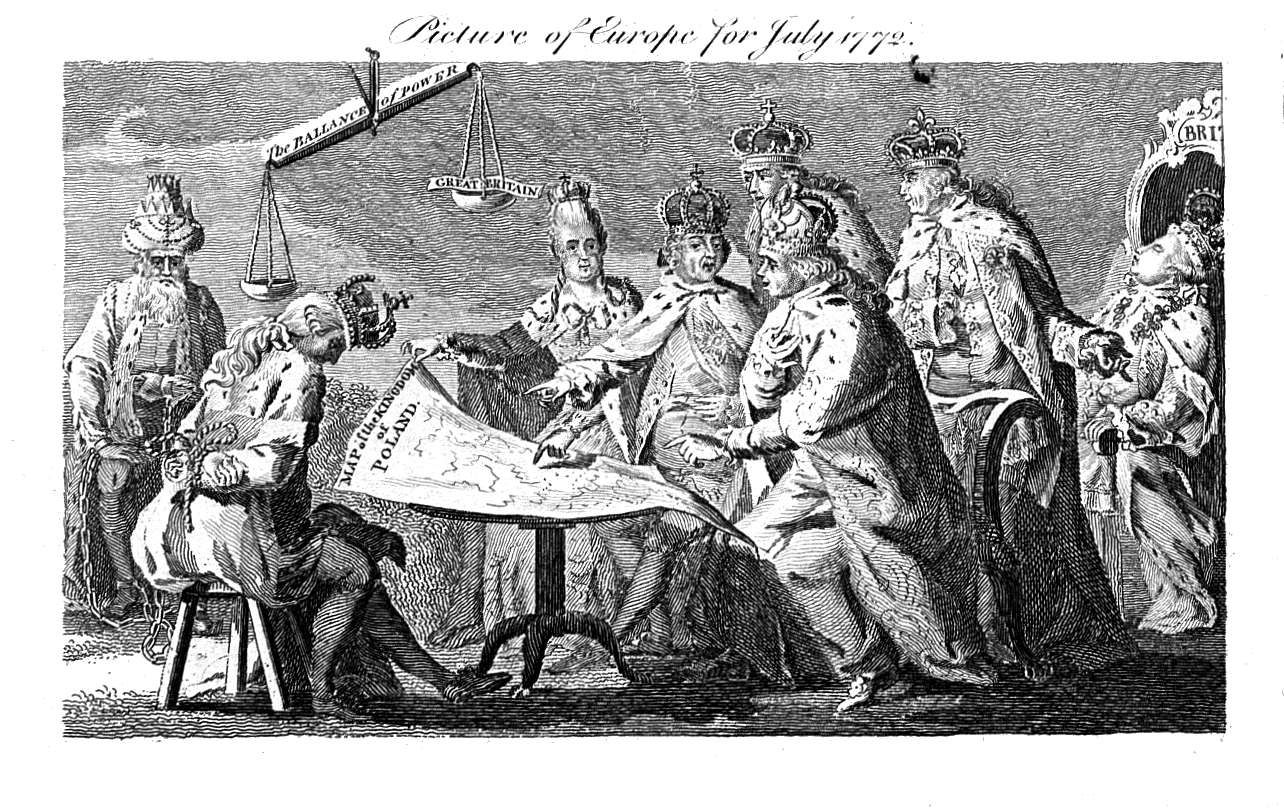
Picture of Europe for July 1772, satirical British plate

The Partition Sejm (Polish: Sejm Rozbiorowy) was a Sejm lasting from 1773 to 1775 in the Polish–Lithuanian Commonwealth, convened by its three neighbours (the Russian Empire, Prussia and Austria) in order to legalize their First Partition of Poland. During its first days in session, that Sejm was the site of Tadeusz Rejtan's famous gesture of protest against Partition. The Sejm also passed other legislation, notably establishing the Permanent Council and the Commission of National Education. Cardinal Laws were confirmed.

The new legislation was guaranteed by the Russian Empire, giving it another excuse to interfere in the Commonwealth politics if the legislation it favored was changed. Russia was the party most determined to form the Permanent Council, which it saw as further means to control the Commonwealth.

The creation of the Commission of National Education, the Commonwealth's and Europe's first ministry of education, is seen as the proudest and most constructive achievement of the otherwise often-deplored Partition Sejm.

== Background ==
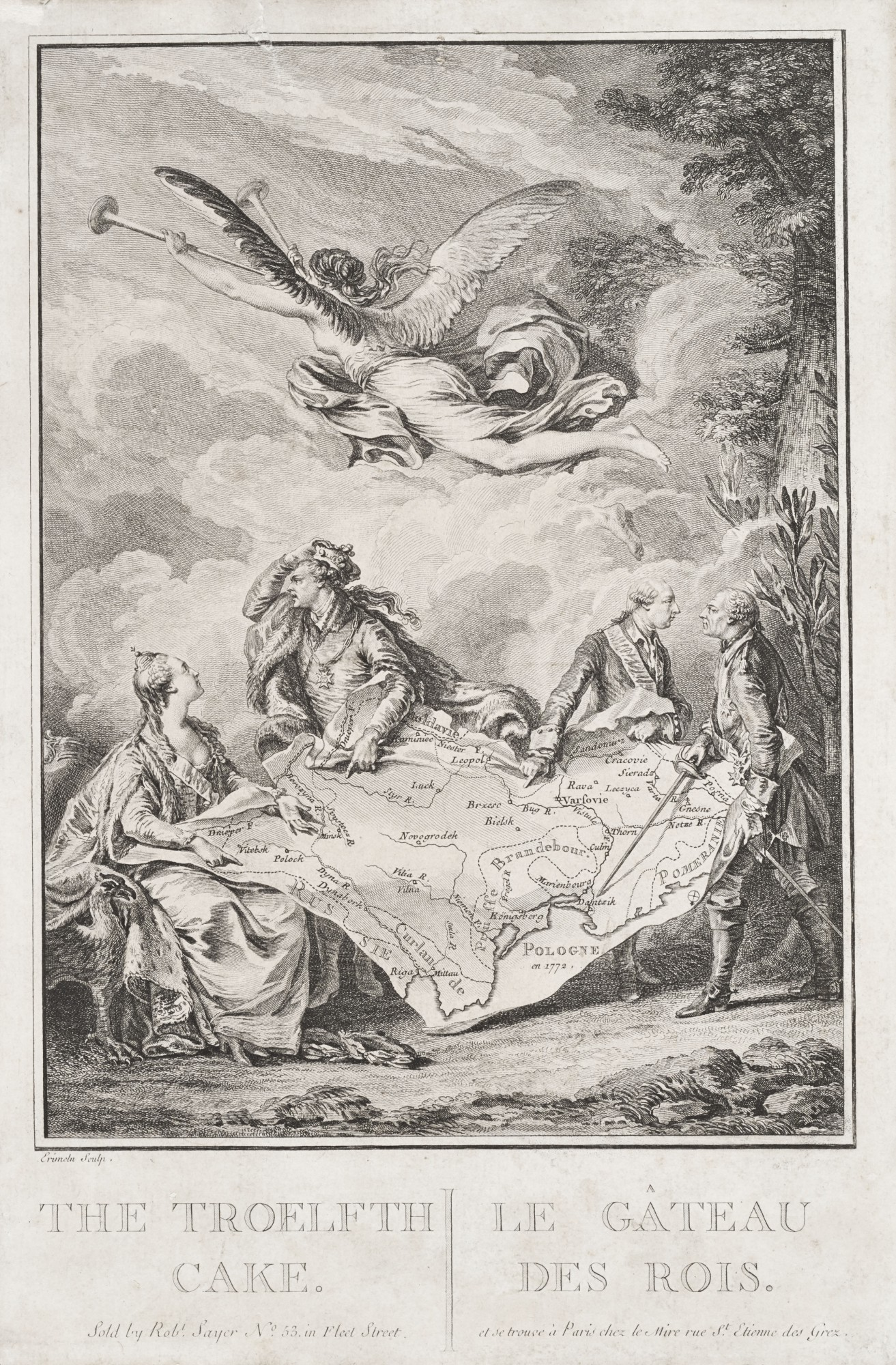
The Troelfth Cake, a 1773 French allegory by Jean-Michel Moreau le Jeune for the First Partition of Poland^{[a]}

In the late 17th and early 18th centuries the Polish-Lithuanian Commonwealth was reduced from the status of a major European power to that of a Russian protectorate (or vassal or client state or satellite state). Russian tsars effectively chose Polish-Lithuanian monarchs utilizing the "free elections" and decided the outcome of much of Poland's internal politics. The Repnin Sejm, for example, was named after the Russian ambassador who unofficially presided over the proceedings.

The Partition Sejm and the First Partition occurred after the balance of power in Europe shifted, with Russian victories against the Ottomans in the Russo-Turkish War (1768–1774) strengthening Russia and endangering Habsburg interests in that region (particularly in Moldavia and Wallachia). At that point, Habsburg Austria considered waging a war against Russia.

Prussia, friendly towards both Russia and Austria, suggested a series of territorial adjustments, in which Austria would be compensated by parts of Prussian Silesia, and Prussia in turn would receive Polish Ermland (Warmia) and parts of the Royal Prussia, a Polish fief already under Baltic German hegemony. King Frederick II of Prussia had no intention of giving up Silesia, gained recently in the Silesian Wars. He was, however, also interested in finding a peaceful solution – his alliance with Russia would draw him into a potential war with Austria, and the Seven Years' War had left Prussia's treasury and army weakened. He was also interested in protecting the weakening Ottoman Empire, which could be advantageously utilized in the event of a Prussian war either with Russia or Austria. Frederick's brother, Prince Henry, spent the winter of 1770–71 as a representative of the Prussian court at Saint Petersburg. As Austria had annexed 13 towns in the Hungarian Szepes region in 1769 (violating the Treaty of Lubowla), Catherine II of Russia and her advisor General Ivan Chernyshyov suggested to Henry that Prussia claim some Polish land, such as Ermland. After Henry informed Frederick of the proposal, the Prussian monarch suggested a partition of the Polish borderlands by Austria, Prussia, and Russia, with the largest share going to the party most weakened by the recent changes in balance of power, Austria. Thus Frederick attempted to encourage Russia to direct its expansion towards weak and dysfunctional Poland instead of the Ottomans. Austrian statesman Wenzel Anton Graf Kaunitz counter-proposed that Prussia take lands from Poland in return for relinquishing Silesia to Austria, but this plan was rejected by Frederick.

Although for a few decades (since the times of the Silent Sejm) Russia had seen a weak Poland as its own protectorate, Poland had also been devastated by a civil war in which the forces of the Bar Confederation attempted to disrupt Russian control over Poland. The recent Koliyivschyna peasant and Cossack uprising in Ukraine also weakened Poland's position. Further, the Russian-supported Polish king, Stanisław August Poniatowski, was seen as both weak and too independent-minded; eventually the Russian court decided that the usefulness of Poland as a protectorate had diminished. The three powers officially justified their actions as a compensation for dealing with a troublesome neighbor and restoring order in Poland through military intervention (the Bar Confederation provided a convenient excuse); in fact all three were interested in territorial gains.

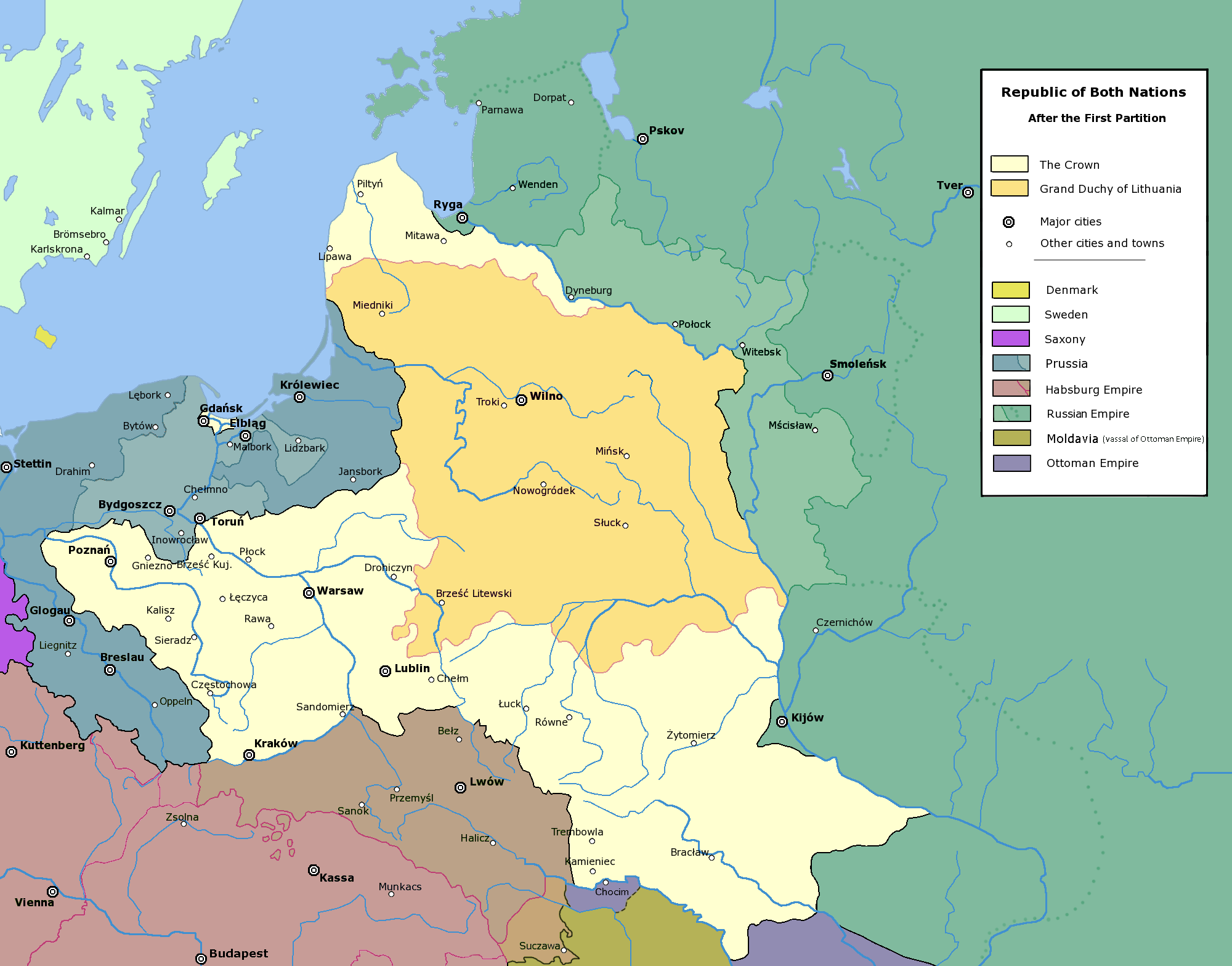
The First Partition of Poland (1772)

After Russia occupied the Danubian Principalities, Henry convinced Frederick and Archduchess Maria Theresa of Austria that the balance of power would be maintained by a tripartite division of the Polish-Lithuanian Commonwealth instead of Russia taking land from the Ottomans. Under pressure from Prussia, which for a long time wanted to annex the northern Polish province of Royal Prussia, the three powers agreed on the First Partition of Poland. This was proposed under the threat of the possible Austrian-Ottoman alliance. Only token objections were however raised by Austria, which would have instead preferred to receive more Ottoman territories in the Balkans, a region which for a long time had been coveted by the Habsburgs. The Russians also withdrew from Moldavia away from the Austrian border. An attempt of Bar Confederates to kidnap King Poniatowski on 3 November 1771 gave the three courts a pretext to showcase the "Polish anarchy" and the need for its neighbors to step in and "save" the country and its citizens.

Already by 1769–71, both Austria and Prussia had annexed some border territories belonging to the Commonwealth. On 19 February 1772, the agreement of partition was signed in Vienna. A previous agreement between Prussia and Russia had been made in Saint Petersburg on 6 February 1772. Early in August Russian, Prussian and Austrian troops simultaneously entered the Commonwealth and occupied the provinces agreed upon among themselves. On 5 August, the three parties signed the treaty on their respective territorial gains at the Commonwealth's expense. The partition treaty was ratified by its signatories on 22 September 1772.

After having occupied their respective territories, the three partitioning powers demanded that King Poniatowski and the Sejm approve their action. The King appealed to the nations of Western Europe for help and tarried with the convocation of the Sejm. The European powers reacted to the partition with indifference; only a few voices – like that of Edmund Burke – were raised in protest.

While the Polish king and the Senate of Poland were debating on the course of action, the patience of foreign powers was running out. Eventually, one of the most prominent opponents of agreeing to the foreign demands, bishop Adam Stanisław Krasiński, was abducted by Cossacks and transported to Warsaw, where the foreign ambassadors demanded that the King and the Senate call in the Sejm (the entire Polish parliament) to ratify the partition. In another sign of their influence, the next meeting of the Senate saw the senators from the annexed territories denied participation (those denied participation included the bishop of Inflanty, the voivode of Ruthenia and the voivode of Witebsk). When no help was forthcoming and the armies of the combined nations occupied Warsaw to compel by force of arms the calling of the assembly, no alternative was available save passive submission to their will. Warsaw was de facto a garrison of the foreign powers, with their forces commanded by the Austrian (or Russian, sources vary) general Abram Romanius (Abraham). On 19 April the Senate agreed to call for the Sejm to convene.

== Preparations ==
Preparations for the Sejm were not easy. Bishops Krasiński and Kajetan Sołtyk argued vocally against it. At least 32 sejmiks (regional parliaments) that were to elect deputies to it were disrupted. Eventually less than half of the regular number of representatives – only about 102–111 (sources vary) deputies, the lowest number in the history of the Commonwealth – arrived in Warsaw, where they were joined by about 36 senators and ministers. Most of the deputies from the Grand Duchy of Lithuania did not attend this Sejm.

Russia was represented by Otto von Stackelberg, Prussia by Gedeon Benoit and Austria by Karl Reviczky.

== Partition Treaty ==
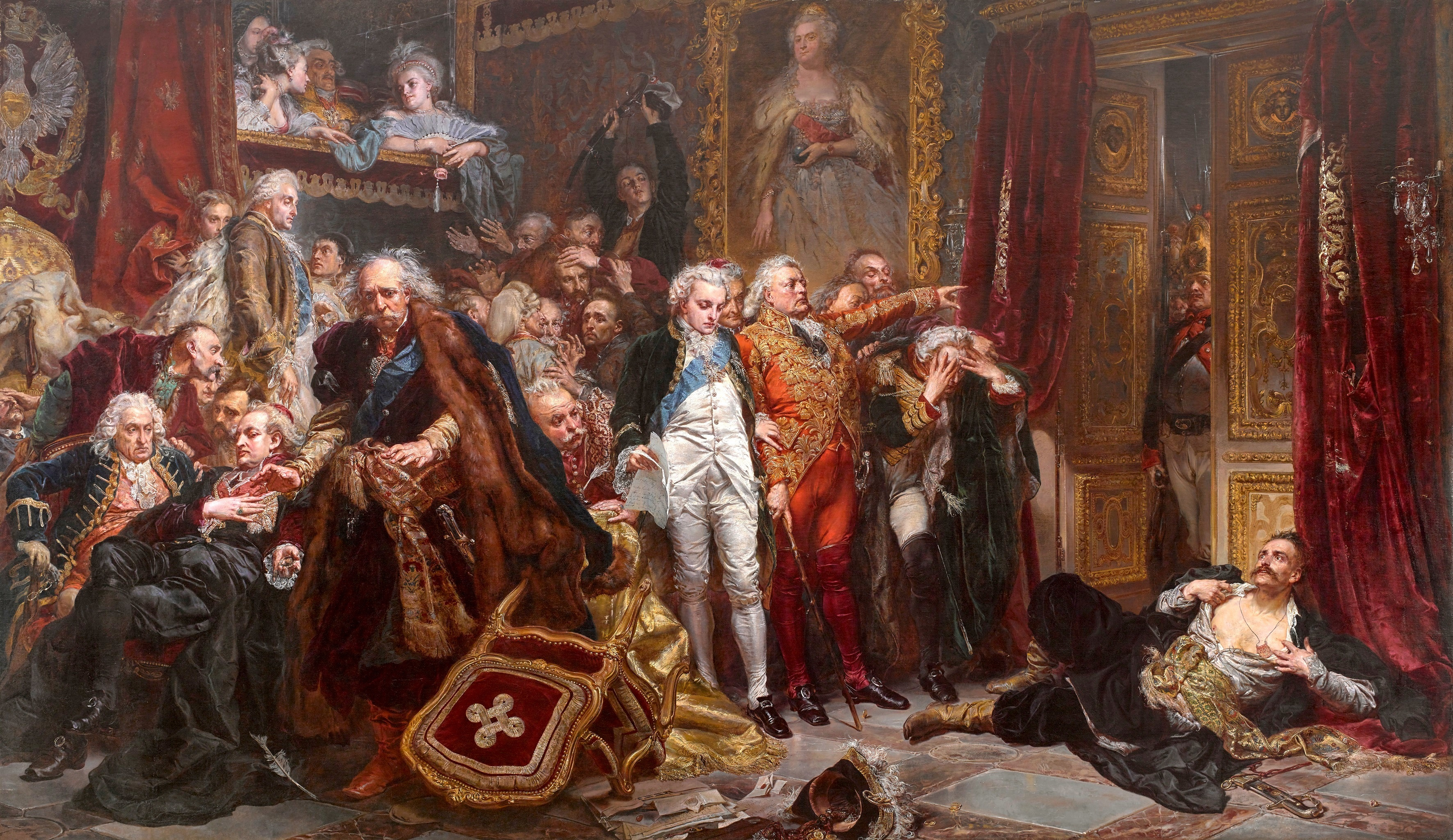
Tadeusz Rejtan's protest against the partition treaty was immortalized in the painting by Jan Matejko.

The Sejm began on 19 April (although some preliminary discussions took place days before). It took place in Warsaw and the deputies and senators in service of foreign powers declared it a confederated sejm (with decisions decided by the majority) to prevent liberum veto (the right of any deputy to force an immediate end to the current session and nullify any legislation that had already been passed) being used to stop it. The marshals of the Sejm were Adam Poniński, one of the nobles in Russian service, for the Crown of Poland, and Michał Hieronim Radziwiłł for the Grand Duchy of Lithuania. At least half of the deputies were bribed by the foreign powers, and others were threatened. Some deputies (Tadeusz Rejtan, Samuel Korsak, Stanisław Bohuszewicz, Franciszek Jerzmanowski, Stanisław Kożuchowski, Rupert Dunin, Jan Tymowski, J. Zaremba, Michał Radoszewski, Ignacy Suchecki, Tadeusz Wołodkowicz) tried to protest, which caused delays. Out of those, Rejtan's gesture – in which he was said to have barred the doors, torn his shirt, and asked other deputies to murder him rather than Poland – became widely known, and was immortalized in a painting by Jan Matejko. By 24 April the few vocal opponents, such as Rejtan, had lost, the confederation was joined by the King and the Sejm elected a committee of thirty to deal with the various matters presented (primarily the partitioners' demands, but also some reforms to the government). The committee was to deliberate until September, and the rest of the Sejm was adjourned in the meantime.

Despite some protests, on 18 September 1773, the Committee formally signed the treaty of cession, renouncing all claims of the Commonwealth to the occupied territories. The Sejm on 30 September 1773 accepted the partition treaty. By the first partition the Polish–Lithuanian Commonwealth lost about 211,000 km^{2} (30% of its territory, amounting at that time to about 733,000 km^{2}), with a population of over four to five million people (about a third of its population of 14 million before the partitions). The treaty was a major success for Frederick II of Prussia: Prussia's share might have been the smallest, but it was also significantly developed and strategically important. Russia received the largest, but economically least-important area, in the northeast.

Notable supporters of the partition, in addition to Poniński, included Michał Hieronim Radziwiłł and the bishops Andrzej Młodziejowski, Ignacy Jakub Massalski, and Primate of Poland Antoni Kazimierz Ostrowski, who occupied high positions in the Senate of Poland.

The senators who protested were threatened by the Russians (represented by Ambassador Otto von Stackelberg), who declared that in the face of refusal the whole capital of Warsaw would be destroyed. Other threats included executions, confiscation of estates, and increase of territory subjected to partition. Some senators were arrested and exiled to Siberia.

== Other legislation ==
The partitioning powers (in particular, Russia) demanded that the Sejm pass further reforms, with the intent of strengthening their power over the Commonwealth. The original commission was allowed to work till January 1774, extending the Sejm, which was adjourned again. The commission was unable to carry out its changes in that period, and thus it was allowed to extend its deliberations once more; there were ultimately seven such extensions.

The Cardinal Laws, a quasi-constitution endorsing most of the conservative laws responsible for the inefficient functioning of the Commonwealth, were confirmed and guaranteed by the partitioning powers. The Sejm also continued enacting laws reducing religious tolerance in the Commonwealth. The passive electoral rights of the Orthodox, Eastern Catholics and Protestants were diminished, with a restriction limiting the number of non-Roman Catholic Sejm deputies to three (one from Greater Poland, one from Lesser Poland, and one from the Grand Duchy of Lithuania). They were also banned from election to the Senate or ministerial positions.

Royal power was restricted, as the king lost the power to give titles and positions of military officers, ministers and senators, and the starostwo territories for Crown lands, most of which would be awarded through an auction. In return, the king received four starostwa for personal possession. The royal (free) election was confirmed, with stipulations that future kings had to come from the Polish nobility, and sons and grandsons of any king could not succeed him to the throne till two others had held it in the interim.

A trade treaty was signed between the Commonwealth and Prussia, unfavorable to the Commonwealth. The Partition cut off the Commonwealth's access to the Baltic Sea, and the state had no choice but to accept the high tariffs imposed by Prussia.

The Sejm also created two notable institutions: the Permanent Council, a main governmental body in continuous operation, and the Commission of National Education. The council was intended by the partitioners to be an institution easier to control than the unruly Sejms, and indeed it remained under the influence of the Russian Empire. It was nonetheless a significant improvement in the Commonwealth governance. The council, with committees (ministries) on Foreign Affairs, Treasury, Defense, Justice and the Interior (Police), was able to interpret existing laws in the sphere of administration, and provided the Commonwealth with a continuous governing body that operated between the Sejms and was not affected by the liberum veto. The Permanent Council was led by the king, had 36 members elected, half from each chamber of the Sejm, and ruled by majority vote (the king decided in case of a tie). The previously powerful ministers were placed under the control of the new council and supervised by the five parallel departments of the council. The council, in addition to its administrative duties, would present to the king three candidates for each nomination to the Senate and other main offices.

The Commission of National Education, another type of a newly created ministry (a central state institution of a collegial structure), was one of the three Great Commissions (the other two were for the Treasury and the Army). It took over many of the possessions of the recently disbanded Jesuit order,^{[b]} and became the first ministry of education in Europe. As such, its creation is universally seen as the proudest and most constructive achievement of the otherwise deplored Partition Sejm. The fiscal policy was also reformed, with one tax being introduced and tariffs being reintroduced. Military was reformed, with hetmans being held more accountable to the Sejm. The size of the army was ordered to be increased to 30,000 (this goal would not be met). Szlachta (a Polish noble class) were officially allowed to deal in trade and crafts (previously, engaging in "urban" professions risked losing one's noble status). The severity of serfdom was discussed, but no significant reforms were passed in that field.

The new legislation was guaranteed by the Russian Empire, giving it another pretext to interfere in Commonwealth politics if the legislation was changed.

Corruption was rampant. Deputies awarded themselves various starostwa and other privileges. Various fraudulent deals were made that channeled funds intended for government institutions, such as the Commission of National Education, to the pockets of the deputies and their allies.

The commission ended its deliberations on 27 March 1775. The Sejm resumed, accepting the various new acts, and was finally ended on 11 April 1775.

== See also ==
- Administrative division of Polish territories after partitions
- Second Partition of Poland

== Notes ==
a The picture shows the rulers of the three countries that participated in the partition tearing a map of Poland apart. The outer figures demanding their share are Catherine II of Russia and Frederick II of Prussia. The inner figure on the right is the Habsburg Emperor Joseph II, who appears ashamed of his action (although in reality he was more of an advocate of the partition, and it was his mother, Maria Theresa, who was critical of the partition). On his left is the beleaguered Polish king, Stanisław August Poniatowski, who is experiencing difficulty keeping his crown on his head. Above the scene the angel of peace trumpets the news that civilized 18th-century sovereigns have accomplished their mission while avoiding war. The drawing gained notoriety in contemporary Europe, with bans on its distribution in several European countries.

b The 1773 papal bull Dominus ac Redemptor had ordered the Jesuits' suppression.
