= Barefoot szlachta =

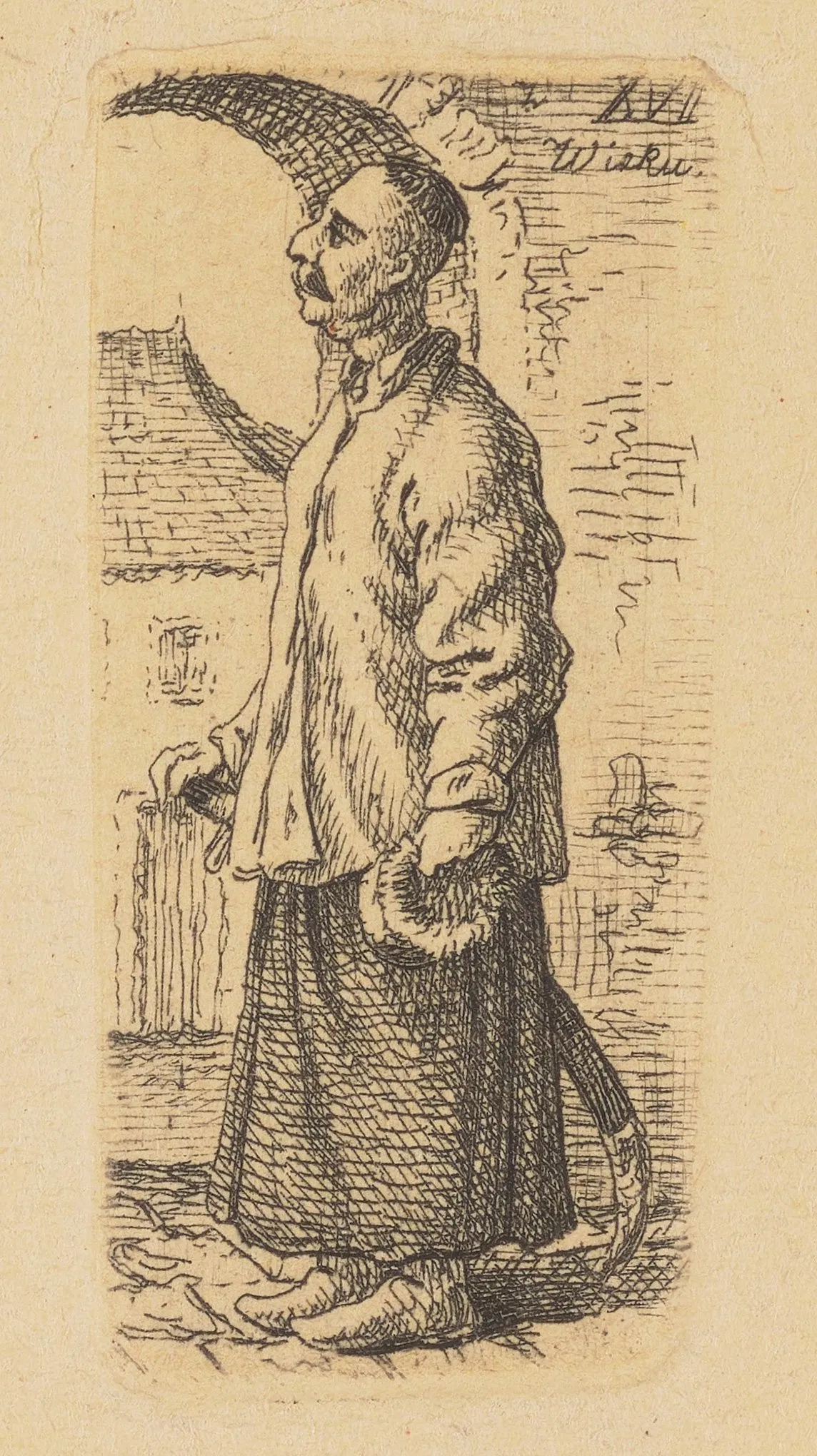
Poor szlachtic with the only proud possession: karabela

In the history of Poland, barefoot szlachta (Polish: gołota szlachecka, szlachta gołota) was the landless szlachta, who neither owned or rented land; the poorest szlachta, considered the "lowest of the high." In legal documents they were called impossessionati ("impossessionati, seu odarti alias holota"). (Note: Odarti ("ragged ones") and gołota ("bare ones") are Polish pejorative terms for poor people)

Until the end of the 16th century landless szlachta had limited rights, in particular they could not hold an office and were subject to some restrictions in court, in particular, the nobles' right neminem captivabimus (a form of personal immunity) was questioned. During 16th-18th centuries they formally had full rights. Since they had no income they sought to be clients of magnates, in particular they sold them their voices in sejmiks and served in their private armies. The Constitution of 3 May 1791 deprived them of the right to vote in sejmiks, in order to get rid on the voting abuse. Before that, the 1780 Zamoyski Code (proposed but failed) sought to deprive them of many legal immunities.

Since they didn't have land, they did not pay estate tax, but they were still subject to poll tax, although at a lower rate than other szlachta.

A distinction is noted between the rural gołota and urban gołota.
