= Ignacy Suchecki =

Ignacy Suchecki of Poraj (died 1803) was the stolnik of Chernihiv in 1754, and the colonel of Piotrków County in 1764.

In 1764, he was an elector of Stanisław August Poniatowski from Sieradz Voivodeship. He, along with a number of deputies in the Partition Sejm, attempted to prevent the legalization of the First Partition of Poland, but ultimately failed.

== Bibliography ==
- Akt elekcyi Roku Tysiąć Siedemset Sześćdziesiątego Czwartego, Miesiąca Sierpnia, Dnia dwudziestego siódmego, s. 59.
- Urzędnicy województw kijowskiego i czernihowskiego". Oprac. Eugeniusz Janas, Witold Kłaczewski. Kórnik 2002, s. 325.
