= Neminem captivabimus =

Neminem captivabimus is a legal term in Polish and Lithuanian historical law that was short for neminem captivabimus nisi iure victum (Latin, "We shall not arrest anyone without a court verdict").

In the Crown of the Kingdom of Poland and the Polish–Lithuanian Commonwealth, it was one of the szlachta's privileges, stating that the king could neither punish nor imprison any member of the szlachta without a viable court verdict. Its purpose was to release someone who had been arrested unlawfully. Neminem captivabimus had nothing to do with whether the prisoner is guilty but only with whether due process had been observed.

It was introduced by King Władysław Jagiełło in the Acts of Jedlnia (1430) and Kraków (1433) and remained in use until the Partitions of Poland (1772–1795). The same acts guaranteed that he would not confiscate any szlachta property without a court verdict.

The Four-Year Sejm (1791) decided that the privilege be granted to inhabitants of royal cities who owned real property there and to the Polish Jews.

== See also ==
- Habeas corpus
