= Subdivisions of the Polish–Lithuanian Commonwealth =

Union of 1569–1648

Polish–Lithuanian Commonwealth
- 1569–1648
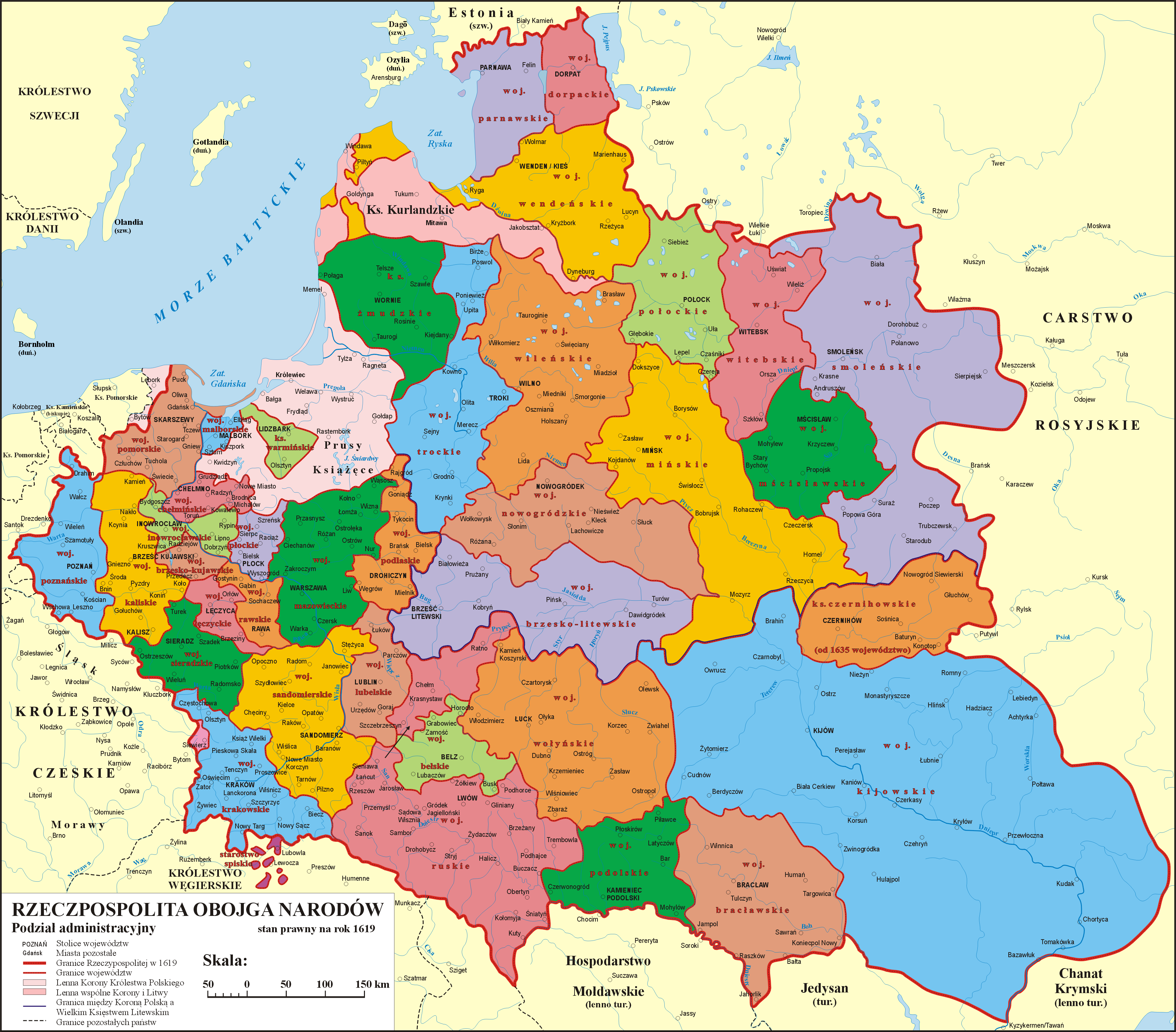
- Administrative division of the Polish–Lithuanian Commonwealth in 1619, around the time of the Commonwealth's greatest extent
- 1667–1768
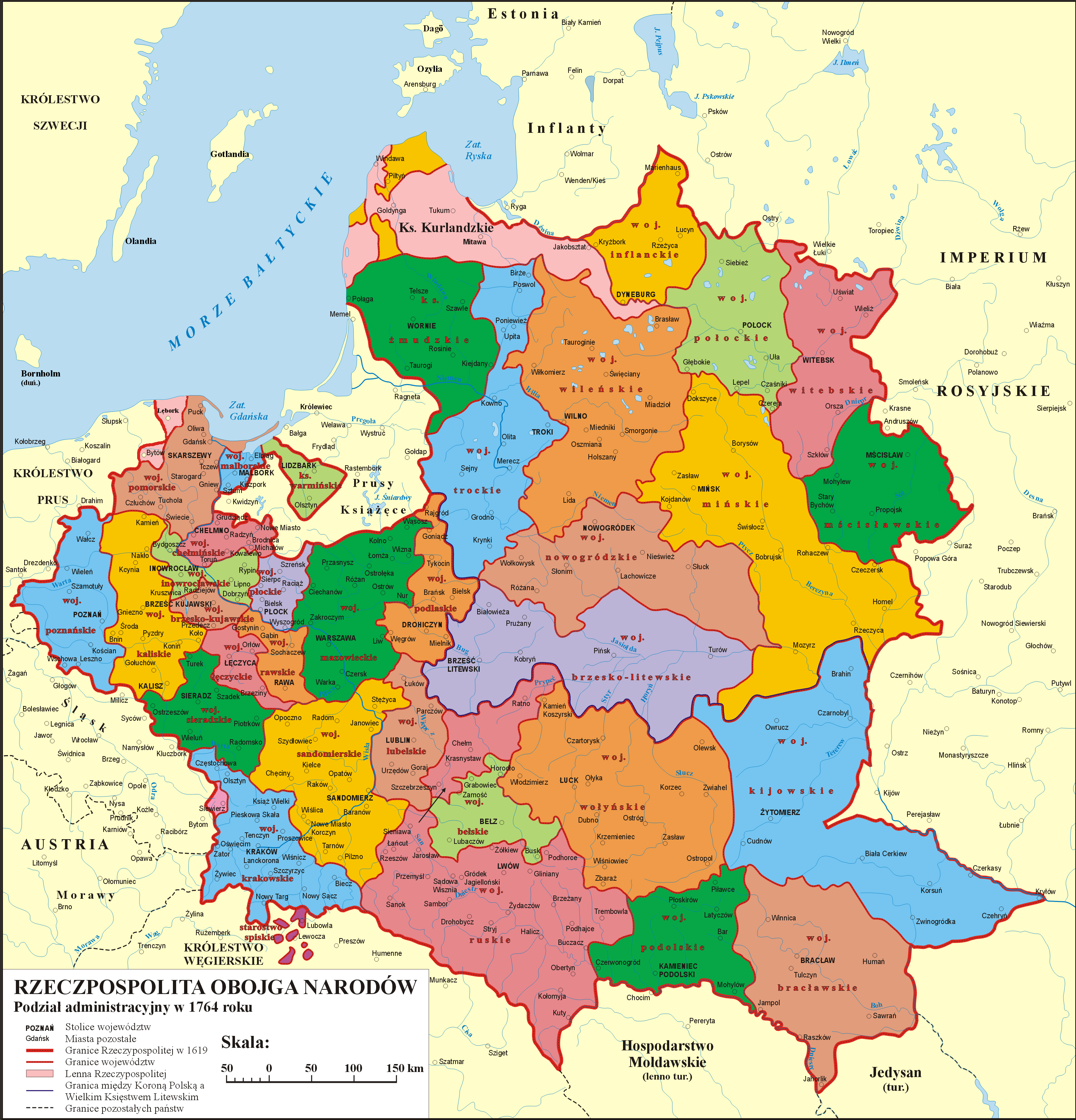
- Administrative division of the Polish–Lithuanian Commonwealth 1667–1768, following the territorial losses of the mid-17th century

Provincial divisions of the Polish–Lithuanian Commonwealth. Province Greater Poland Province of Lesser Poland Province of Lithuania Livonia

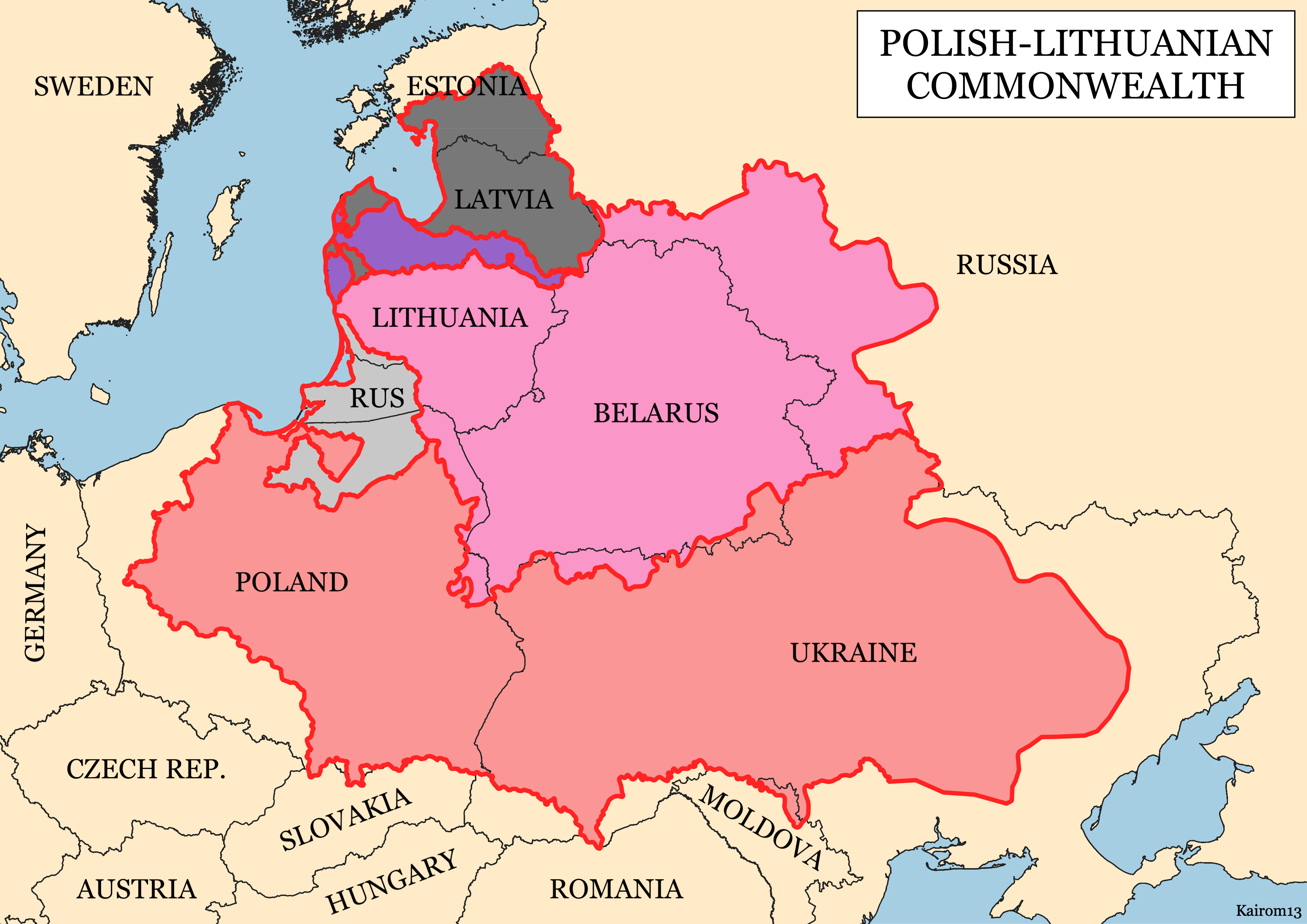
Outline of the Polish–Lithuanian Commonwealth with its major subdivisions after the 1618 Truce of Deulino, superimposed on present-day national borders. Crown of the Kingdom of Poland Grand Duchy of Lithuania Duchy of Livonia Duchy of Prussia, Polish fief Duchy of Courland and Semigallia, Commonwealth fief

Subdivisions of the Polish–Lithuanian Commonwealth evolved over for centuries of its existence from the signing of the Union of Lublin to the third partition.

The lands that once belonged to the Commonwealth are now largely distributed among several central, eastern, and northern European countries: Poland (except western Poland), Lithuania, Latvia, Belarus, most of Ukraine, parts of Russia, southern half of Estonia, and smaller pieces in Slovakia and Moldova.

== Terminology ==
While the term "Poland" was also commonly used to denote this whole polity, Poland was in fact only part of a greater whole – the Polish–Lithuanian Commonwealth, which comprised primarily two parts:

- the Crown of the Kingdom of Poland (Poland proper), colloquially "the Crown"; and
- the Grand Duchy of Lithuania, colloquially "Lithuania".

The Crown in turn comprised two "prowincjas": Greater Poland and Lesser Poland. These and a third province, the Grand Duchy of Lithuania, were the only three regions that were properly termed "provinces". The Commonwealth was further divided into smaller administrative units known as voivodeships (województwa – note that some sources use the word palatinate instead of voivodeship). Each voivodeship was governed by a Voivode (governor). Voivodeships were further divided into powiats (often translated as county) being governed by a starosta generalny or grodowy. Cities were governed by castellans. There were frequent exceptions to these rules, often involving the ziemia subunit of administration: for details on the administrative structure of the Commonwealth, see the article on offices in the Polish–Lithuanian Commonwealth.

Royal lands (królewszczyzna) further divided into starostwa, each starostwo being governed by a starosta niegrodowy.

== Administrative division ==
By provinces, voivodeships and lesser entities.

=== Crown of the Kingdom of Poland ===
Crown of the Kingdom of Poland or just colloquially The Crown (Polish: Korona) is the name for the territories under Polish direct administration in the times of Kingdom of Poland until the end of Polish–Lithuanian Commonwealth in 1795.

Coat of arms	Banner	Voivodeship after 1569	Capital	Year established	Number of powiats (counties)	Area (km^{2})
		Bełz Voivodeship	Bełz (Belz)	1462	4 powiats	9,000
		Bracław Voivodeship	Bracław (Bratslav)	1569	2 powiats	31,500
		Brześć Kujawski Voivodeship	Brześć Kujawski	14th century	5 powiats	3,000
		Chełmno Voivodeship	Chełmno	1454	7 powiats	4,654
		Czernihów Voivodeship	Czernihów (Chernihiv)	1635	2 powiats	
		Gniezno Voivodeship	Gniezno	1768	3 powiats	7,500
		Inowrocław Voivodeship	Inowrocław	1364	3 powiats	5,877
		Kalisz Voivodeship	Kalisz	1314	6 powiats	15,000
		Kijów Voivodeship	Kijów (Kyiv)	1471	3 powiats	200,000
		Kraków Voivodeship	Kraków	14th century	4 powiats	17,500
		Lublin Voivodeship	Lublin	1474	3 powiats	10,000
		Łęczyca Voivodeship	Łęczyca	1772	3 powiats	4,000
		Malbork Voivodeship	Malbork	1466	4 powiats	2,000
		Masovian Voivodeship	Warsaw	1526	23 powiats	23,000
		Podole Voivodeship	Kamieniec Podolski (Kamianets-Podilskyi)	1434	3 powiats	17,750
		Pomeranian Voivodeship	Skarszewy	1466	8 powiats	12,907
		Poznań Voivodeship	Poznań	14th century	4 powiats	15,500
		Płock Voivodeship	Płock	1495	8 powiats	3,500
		Podlaskie Voivodeship	Drohiczyn	1513	3 powiats	10,530
		Rawa Voivodeship	Rawa Mazowiecka	1462	6 powiats	6,000
		Ruthenian Voivodeship	Lwów (Lviv)	1434	13 powiats	83,000
		Sandomierz Voivodeship	Sandomierz	14th century	6 powiats	24,000
		Sieradz Voivodeship	Sieradz	1339	4 powiats	10,000
		Volhynian Voivodeship	Łuck (Lutsk)	1569	3 powiats	38,000

Two important ecclesiastical entities with high degree of autonomy within the Crown of Poland were Duchy of Siewierz and Prince-Bishopric of Warmia.

Fiefs of Crown of Poland included the Lauenburg and Bütow Land and two condominiums (joint domain) with the Grand Duchy of Lithuania: Duchy of Livonia and Duchy of Courland and Semigallia.

Some enclaves in the Hungarian area of Spisz were also part of Poland (due to the Treaty of Lubowla).

=== Grand Duchy of Lithuania ===
The Grand Duchy of Lithuania or just colloquially Lithuania (Lithuanian: Lietuva) is the name for the territories under direct Lithuanian administration during medieval sovereign Lithuanian statehood, and later until the end of common Polish-Lithuanian Commonwealth statehood in 1795.

Just before the Union of Lublin (1569), four voivodeships (Kiev, Podlaskie, Bracław, and Wołyń) of the Grand Duchy of Lithuania were transferred to the Polish Crown by direct order of Sigismund II Augustus, and the Duchy of Livonia, acquired in 1561, became a condominium (joint domain) of both Lithuania and Poland. The Duchy of Courland and Semigallia was another condominium.

After 1569, Lithuania had eight voivodeships and one eldership remaining:

Voivodeship after 1569	Coat of arms	Banner	Capital	Year established	Number of powiats	Area (km^{2}) in 1590
Brześć Litewski Voivodeship			Brześć Litewski (Brest)	1566	2 powiats	40,600
Mińsk Voivodeship			Mińsk Litewski (Minsk)	1566	3 powiats	55,500
Mścisław Voivodeship			Mścisław (Mstsislaw)	1566	1 powiat	22,600
Nowogródek Voivodeship			Nowogródek (Novogrudok)	1507	3 powiats	33,200
Połock Voivodeship			Połock (Polotsk)	1504	1 powiat	21,800
Samogitian Eldership			Raseiniai	1411	1 powiat	23,300
Smoleńsk Voivodeship			Smoleńsk (Smolensk)	1508	2 powiats	
Trakai Voivodeship			Trakai	1413	4 powiats	31,100
Vilnius Voivodeship			Vilnius	1413	5 powiats	44,200
Witebsk Voivodeship			Witebsk (Vitebsk)	1511	2 powiats	24,600

One of the oldest Lithuanian territories, the Duchy of Samogitia, had a status equal to that of a voivodeship, but retained the name Duchy.

After the Livonian War (1558–1582), Lithuania acquired vassal state Duchy of Courland with capital in Jelgava.

=== Fiefs ===
==== Duchy of Prussia (1569–1657) ====
The Duchy of Prussia was a duchy in the eastern part of Prussia from 1525 to 1701. In 1525 during the Protestant Reformation, the Grand Master of the Teutonic Knights, Albert of Hohenzollern, secularized the Prussian State of the Teutonic Order, becoming Albert, Duke in Prussia. His duchy, which had its capital in Königsberg (Kaliningrad), was established as a fief of the Crown of Poland, as had been Teutonic Prussia since the Second Peace of Thorn in October 1466. This treaty had ended the War of the Cities or Thirteen Years' War and provided for the Order's cession of its rights over the western half of its territories to the Polish crown, which became the province of Royal Prussia, while the remaining part of the Order's land became a fief of the Kingdom of Poland (1385–1569). In the 17th century King John II Casimir of Poland submitted Frederick William to regain Prussian suzerainty in return for supporting Poland against Sweden. On 29 July 1657, they signed the Treaty of Wehlau in Wehlau (Polish: Welawa; now Znamensk), whereby Frederick William renounced a previous Swedish-Prussian alliance and John Casimir recognised Frederick William's full sovereignty over the Duchy of Prussia. Full sovereignty was a necessary prerequisite for upgrading the Duchy to Kingdom of Prussia in 1701.

==== Duchy of Livonia (Inflanty) (1569–1772) ====
The Duchy of Livonia was a territory of the Grand Duchy of Lithuania – and later a joint domain (Condominium) of the Polish Crown and the Grand Duchy of Lithuania

Coat of arms	Voivodeship	Capital	Year established	Number of starostwos (districts)	Area (km^{2})
	Dorpat Voivodeship	Dorpat (Tartu)	1598	5 starostwos	9,000
	Parnawa Voivodeship	Parnawa (Pärnu)	1598	8 starostwos	12,000
	Wenden Voivodeship	Wenden (Cēsis)	1598	15 starostwos	30,000
	Inflanty Voivodeship	Dyneburg (Daugavpils)	1621	4 starostwos	12,000

==== Duchy of Courland and Semigallia (Courland) (1562–1791) ====
The Duchy of Courland and Semigallia is a duchy in the Baltic region that existed from 1562 to 1791 as a vassal state of the Grand Duchy of Lithuania and later the Polish–Lithuanian Commonwealth. From 1685, District of Pilten was in union with the duchy. In 1791 it gained full independence, but on 28 March 1795, it was annexed by the Russian Empire in the Third Partition of Poland. The duchy also had colonies in Tobago and Gambia

=== Protectorates ===
Caffa

In 1462, during the expansion of the Ottoman Empire and the Crimean Tatars, Caffa placed itself under the protection of King Casimir IV of Poland. The proposition of protection was accepted by the Polish king but when the real danger came, help for Caffa never arrived.

== Reforms of the 1793 Grodno Sejm ==
Following the territorial losses of the Second Partition of Poland, the Grodno Sejm of 1793 introduced a new administrative division (italic marks new voivodeships):

- in the Crown: Chełm Voivodeship, Ciechanów Voivodeship, Kraków Voivodeship, Lublin Voivodeship, Masovian Voivodeship, Podlasie Voivodeship, Sandomierz Voivodeship, Warsaw Voivodeship, Włodzimierz Voivodeship and Wołyń Voivodeship
- in the Grand Duchy: Brasław Voivodeship, Brześć Voivodeship, Grodno Voivodeship, Merecz Voivodeship, Nowogródek Voivodeship, Troki Voivodeship, Wilno Voivodeship, Żmudź Voivodeship (Samogitian Voivodeship)

== Proposed divisions ==
=== Polish–Lithuanian–Swedish Commonwealth (1592–1599) ===
Between 1592 and 1599, a Polish–Swedish union between the Polish–Lithuanian Commonwealth and the Kingdom of Sweden existed but was never stabilized. It began when Sigismund III Vasa, elected King of Poland and Grand Duke of Lithuania, was crowned King of Sweden following the death of his father John III. The union ended following a civil war in Sweden in which he lost the crown to his uncle, who eventually became Charles IX.

=== Polish–Lithuanian–Muscovite Commonwealth (1610–1613) ===
Plans for a Polish–Lithuanian–Muscovite Commonwealth were never realized, despite many attempts by various means to create such a union organised between 1574 and 1658 and in the late 18th century, of which most of them during the Time of Troubles. The idea of such state have never materialized because of the incompatible demands from both sides. During the Polish–Muscovite War (1605–18) the Polish Prince (later, King) Władysław IV Waza was briefly elected Tsar of Muscovy.

=== Polish–Lithuanian–Ruthenian Commonwealth (1658–1659) ===
Thought was given at various times to the creation of a Grand Duchy of Ruthenia, particularly during the 1648 Cossack insurrection against Polish rule in Ukraine. Such a Duchy, as proposed in the 1658 Treaty of Hadiach, would have been a full member of the Commonwealth, which would thereupon have become a tripartite Polish–Lithuanian–Ruthenian Commonwealth, but due to szlachta demands, Muscovite invasion, and division among the Cossacks, the plan was never implemented.
