= Józef Kossakowski =

Józef Kossakowski may refer to:

- Józef Kossakowski (colonel) (1771–1840), colonel, member of the Targowica Confederation, son-in-law of Szczęsy Potocki
- Józef Kossakowski (general) (1772–1842), general of French army, aide-de-camp of Napoleon
- Józef Kossakowski (bishop) (1738–1794), bishop of Inflanty, member of Targowica
