= Dominik Kossakowski =

Polish-Lithuanian nobleman

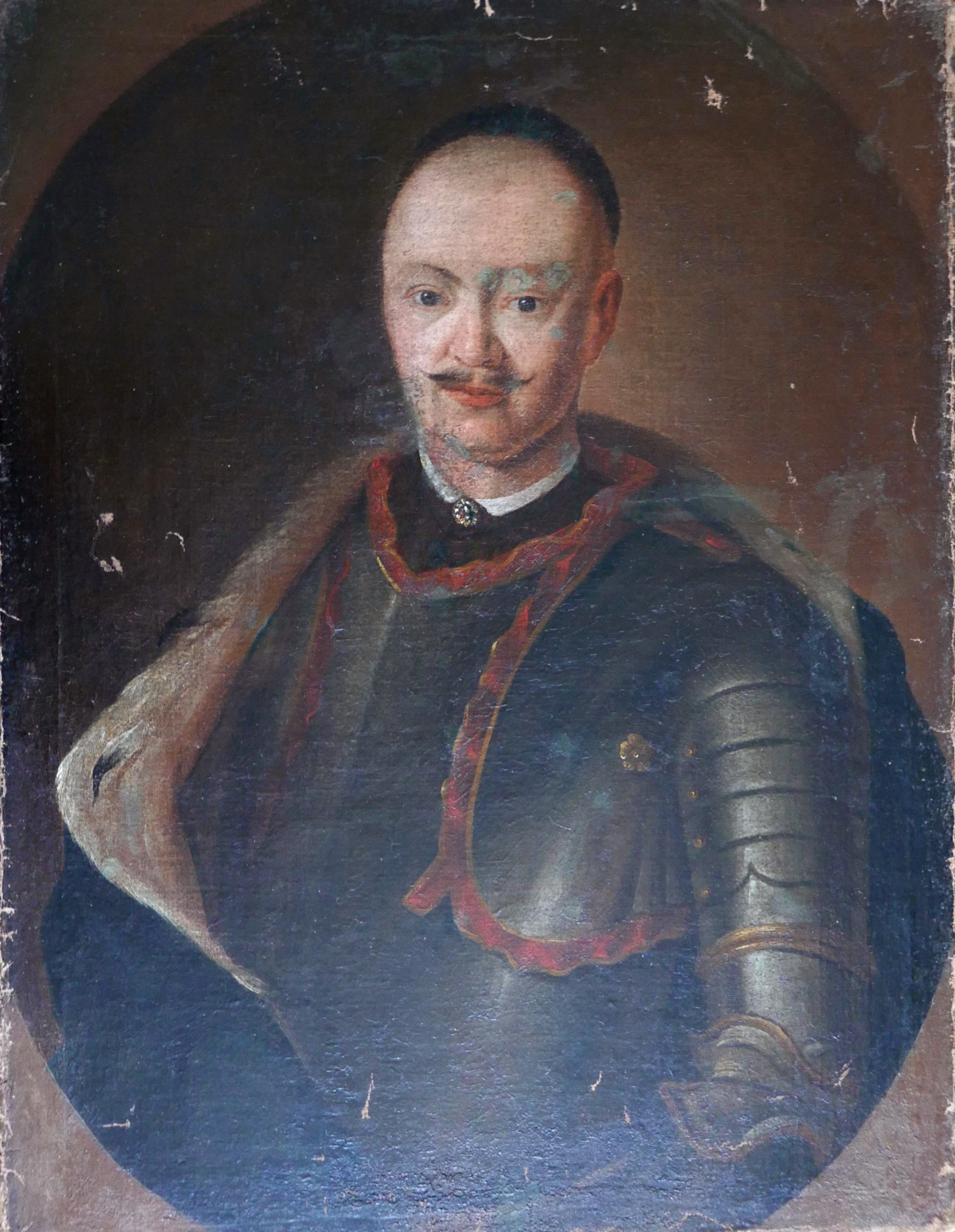
- Born: 1711; Kaunas
- Died: 1743 (aged 31–32); Jonava
- Resting place: Kaunas
- Occupation: military officer
- Spouse: Marianna Zabiełło
- Children: Michał; Antoni; Józef Kazimierz; Szymon Juda Marcin
- Parents: Jan Mikołaj Kossakowski; Anna Skorulska
- Family: Kossakowski family

Dominik Kossakowski (Lithuanian: Dominykas Kosakovskis; 1711–1743) was a Polish-Lithuanian nobleman, a member of the noble Kossakowski family of the Ślepowron coat of arms, and the founder of Jonava.

== Biography ==
He was born into the noble Kossakowski family of the Ślepowron coat of arms, using the Korwin cognomen. His father was Jan Mikołaj Kossakowski, a stolnik of Kaunas, and his mother was Anna, née Skorulska. He was their only son and, as such, the sole heir to the estate of the Lithuanian branch of the Kossakowski family.

Kossakowski began his military career by becoming a lieutenant in the Petyhorcy cavalry regiment. Politically, he aligned himself with the Sapieha faction, which supported the election of Stanisław Leszczyński. After the coronation of Augustus III, he left the country and settled in Königsberg. Upon his return in 1735, he was appointed land judge of Kaunas, and two years later, he became the stolnik of Samogitia. He died young, at the age of 32, in Jonava in 1743, and was buried in Kaunas.

He was regarded as a good and progressive landowner, commissioning numerous drainage works that improved and expanded the land he owned. Between his own estates and those of his wife's family, he founded a town, which he named Janów in honor of his father (today Jonava, in Lithuania).

In 1732, he married Marianna Zabiełło, the daughter of Michał Zabiełło, the land judge of Kaunas, and Anna, née Białozor. Together, they had four sons: Michał, Antoni, Józef Kazimierz and Szymon Juda Marcin, between whom the estate was divided. His only daughter, Anna, married Karol Czarniecki, the son of the castellan of Bracław, Jan Antoni.

== Bibliography ==
- Klempert, Mateusz (2014). "Dzieje Fortuny rodu Kossakowskich z Wojtkuszek". Doktoranckie spotkania z historią (PDF) (in Polish). University of Warmia and Mazury in Olsztyn. ISBN 9788365171047.
- Klempert, Mateusz (2015). "Kossakowscy - ród polsko-litewski. Przyczynek do studium genealogicznego rodziny" [Kossakowskis - the Polish-Lithuanian family. A contribution to the genealogical study of the family]. Meritum (in Polish). 4: 41–58.
- Kossakowski, Stanisław Kazimierz (1859). Monografie historyczno-genealogiczne niektórych rodzin polskich. Vol. 1.
