= Kossakowski =

Ślepowron, the coat of arms of Korwin-Kossakowski

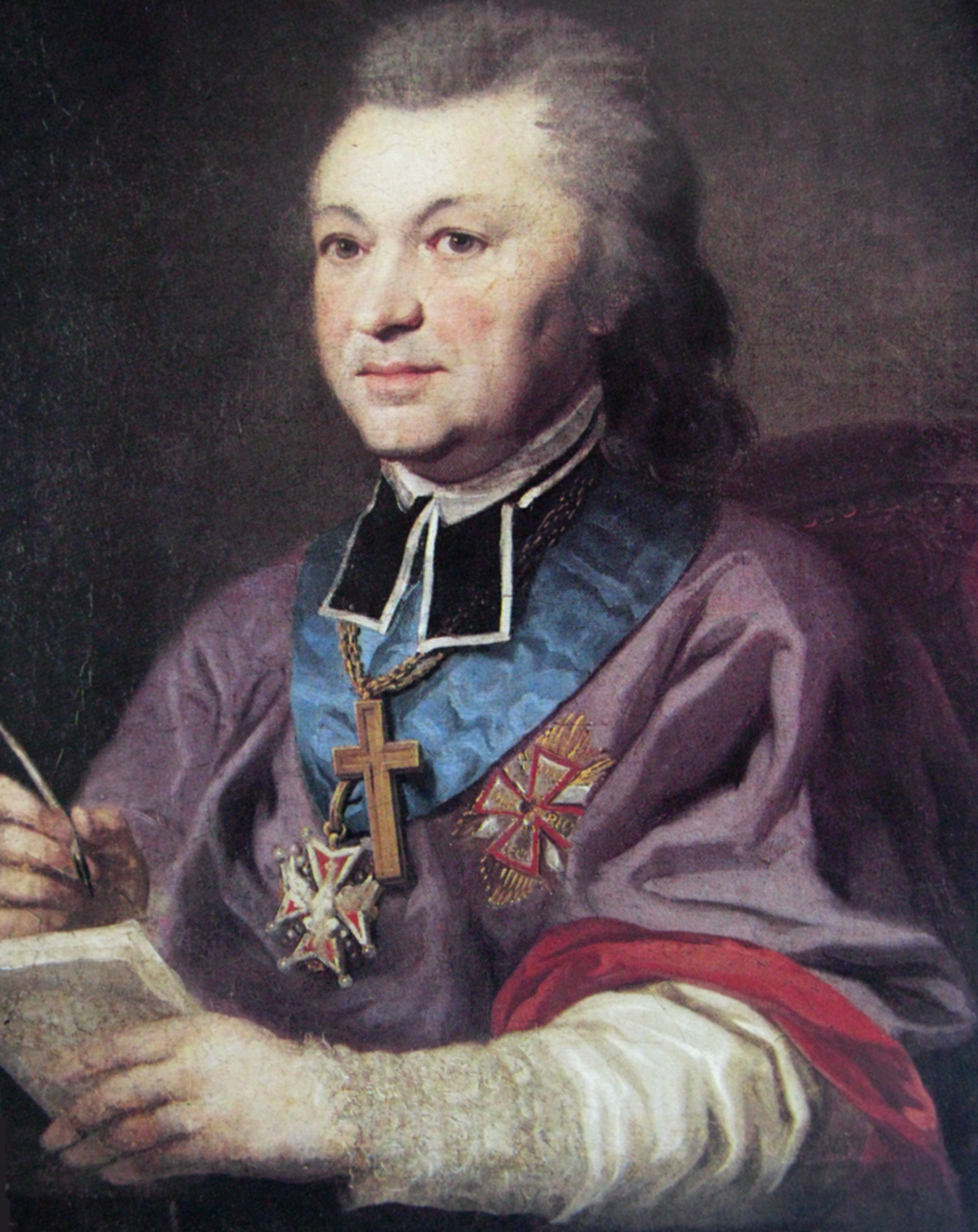
Józef Kazimierz Kossakowski (1738–1794)

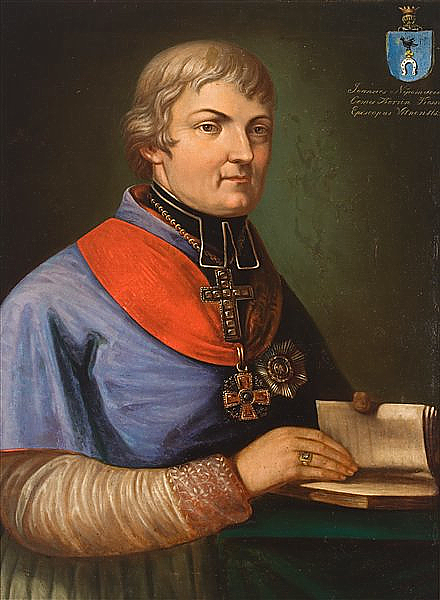
Jan Nepomucen Kossakowski (1755–1808)

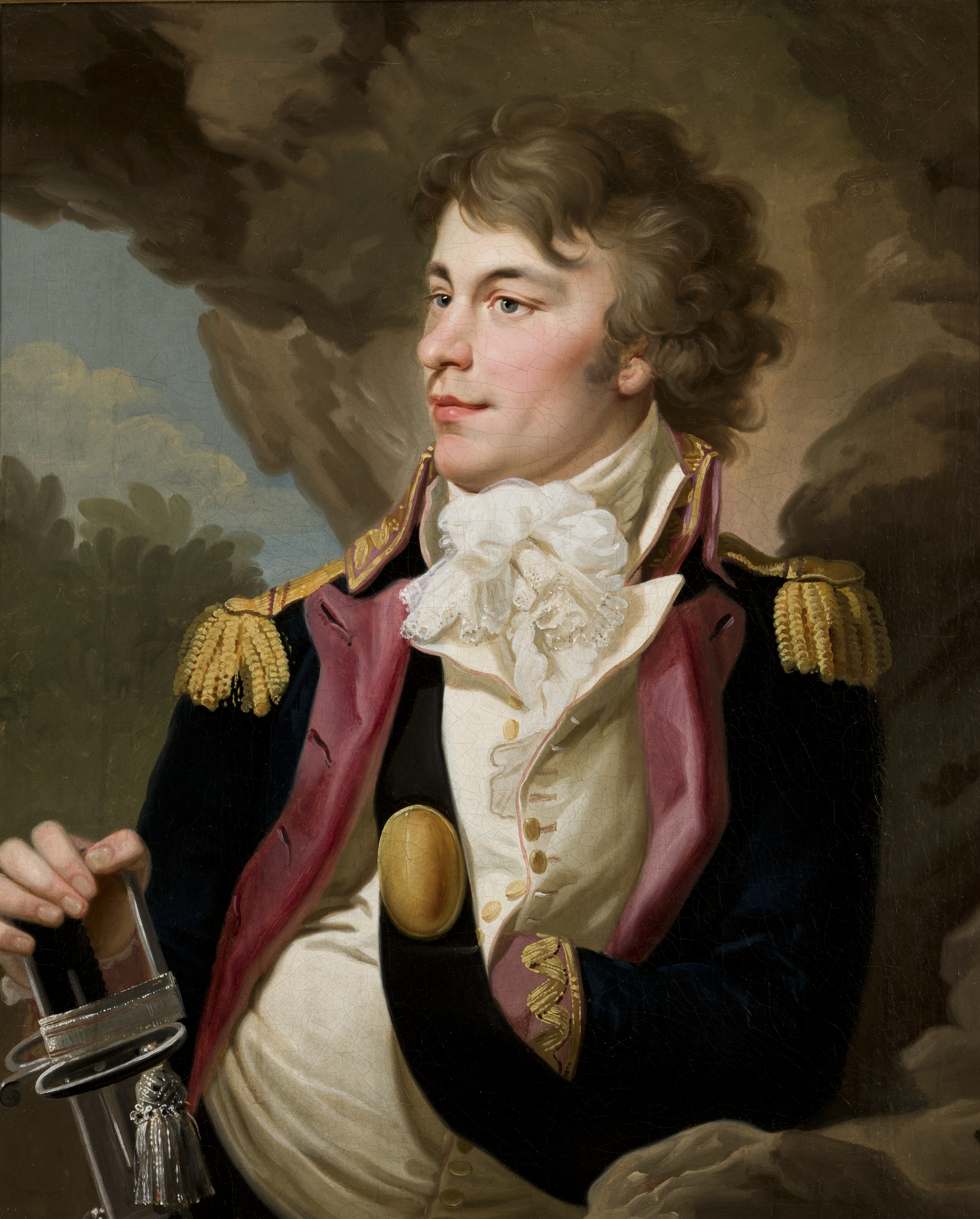
Józef Dominik Kossakowski (1772–1842)

Kossakowski (Lithuanian: Kosakovskiai) (Note: Polish: plural: Kossakowscy, feminine: Kossakowska; Lithuanian: singular forms: m: Kosakovskis, f: Kosakovskienė, Kosakovskytė) was a Polish-Lithuanian noble family originated from Mazovia.

They were first mentioned in the 13th century and initially settled in Ciechanów County, from where they branched out to the Grand Duchy of Lithuania, Podolia, Volhynia, and Livonia.

== History ==
=== Legendary origins ===
According to family legend, the Kossakowski family traced their origins back to a Roman soldier named Valerius, who, during one of his battles, had a raven land on his helmet and assist him in combat. Hence his nickname, Corvus (the raven). His descendants were said to have arrived in Poland via Hungary. Stanisław Kazimierz Kossakowski (1837–1905), the family historian, identified Gopta Primus Gothorum Heros, who lived around the year 440, as the progenitor of the family. Valerius, according to him, was believed to be his descendant.

=== Origins in Mazovia ===
The Kossakowski family was first recorded in the 13th century in the Ciechanów Land. In 1224, Konrad I of Masovia granted land to one of his army commanders, Wawrzęta/Wawrzyniec Korwin. In the 14th and 15th centuries, the Kossakowski family appeared in the Łomża Land, where they established several noble villages named Kossaki. The family gained particular prominence through the sons of Mroczek of Kossaki, Mikołaj Jakub and Stanisław Wojciech, who held official positions in the Wizna Land. They became the progenitors of the two most significant branches of the family.

=== Lithuanian branch ===
The great-grandsons of Mikołaj Jakub Kossakowski, Franciszek Nikodem and Mikołaj, were the first members of the family to attain the office of starosta, successively becoming starostas of Łomża. Franciszek Nikodem Kossakowski distinguished himself in the Battle of Kircholm, and his son Jan Eustachy Kossakowski settled in the Grand Duchy of Lithuania, eventually becoming the castellan of Mścisław. From him descends the Lithuanian magnate branch of the Kossakowski family.

The heir to the Lithuanian estates of the family was Jan Eustachy's grandson, Dominik Kossakowski, the founder of the town of Jonava. He had four sons: Michał, who became the voivode of Vitebsk and Brasław; Szymon Marcin, the Grand Hetman of Lithuania; Józef Kazimierz, the bishop of Livonia; and Antoni, castellan of Livonia. Szymon Marcin and Józef Kazimierz were sentenced to death and executed for treason against the fatherland. Antoni established a branch of the family in Martyniškis, and Michał in Vaitkuškis. At the end of the 18th century, Michał Kossakowski received for the family the title of count, granted by the imperial court in Vienna. The line in Vaitkuškės maintained a high aristocratic status within the Russian Empire. Successive heirs, Józef Kossakowski and Stanisław Szczęsny Kossakowski, each left only one son, which helped preserve the estate from significant diminishment. The son of the latter, the heraldist Stanisław Kazimierz Kossakowski, divided the estate among his three sons; however, it was largely lost due to confiscations following World War II.

== Coat of arms ==
Coat of arms of the Kossakowski family was Ślepowron.

== Notable members ==
- Jan Nepomucen Kossakowski (1755–1808), bishop of Livonia and later of Vilnius
- Józef Dominik Kossakowski (1771–1840), colonel, member of the Targowica Confederation, son-in-law of Stanisław Szczęsny Potocki
- Józef Kossakowski (1772–1842), general of French army, aide-de-camp of Napoleon
- Józef Kazimierz Kossakowski (1738–1794), bishop of Inflanty, a member of the Targowica Confederation
- Szymon Marcin Kossakowski (1741–1794) one of the leaders of the Targowica Confederation and the last Grand Hetman of Lithuania.
- Michał Kossakowski (1733–1798) – voivode of Witebsk and Bracław Voivodeship
- Antoni Kossakowski (1735–1798) – castelan in Livonia
- Jakub Kossakowski (1752–1784) – podstoli of Kaunas
- Jan Nepomucen Kossakowski (1755–1808) – bishop of Inflanty and Vilnius
- Adam Kossakowski (1756–1828) – auxiliary bishop of Livonia and Vilnius, Jesuit
- Stanisław Kazimierz Kossakowski (1837–1905) – heraldist and photographer

== Palaces ==
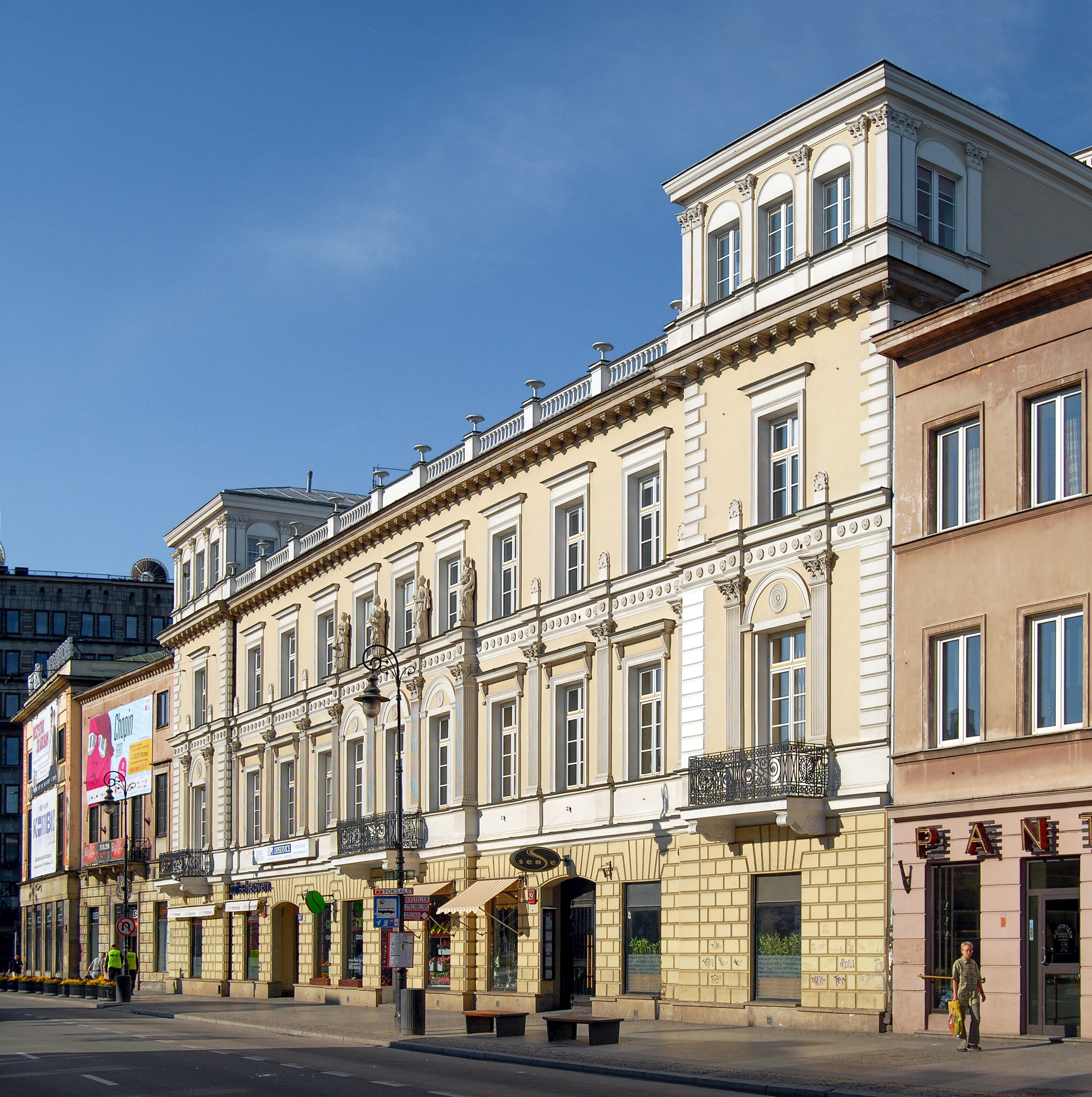
Kossakowski Palace in Warsaw

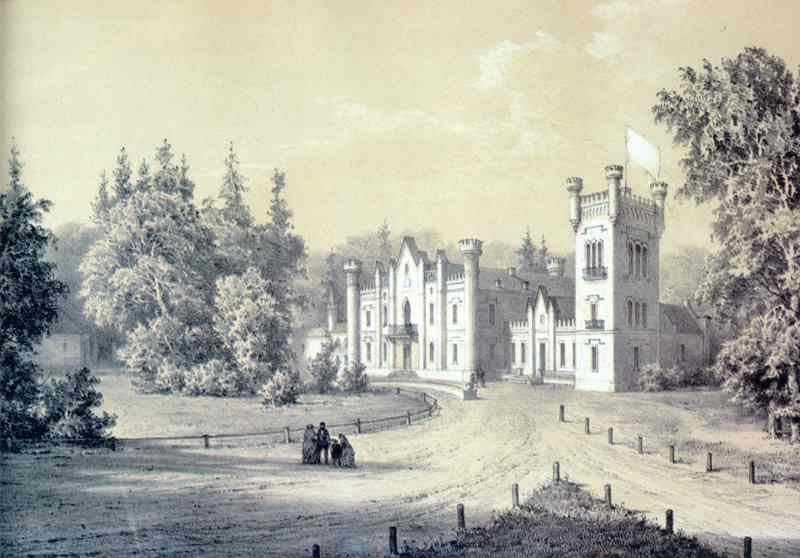
Kossakowski palace in Vaitkuškis

== Bibliography ==
- Klempert, Mateusz (2014). "Dzieje Fortuny rodu Kossakowskich z Wojtkuszek". Doktoranckie spotkania z historią (PDF) (in Polish). University of Warmia and Mazury in Olsztyn. ISBN 9788365171047.
- Klempert, Mateusz (2015). "Kossakowscy - ród polsko-litewski. Przyczynek do studium genealogicznego rodziny" [Kossakowskis - the Polish-Lithuanian family. A contribution to the genealogical study of the family]. Meritum (in Polish). 4: 41–58.
