= Józef Kossakowski (bishop) =

Polish bishop and writer (1738–1794)

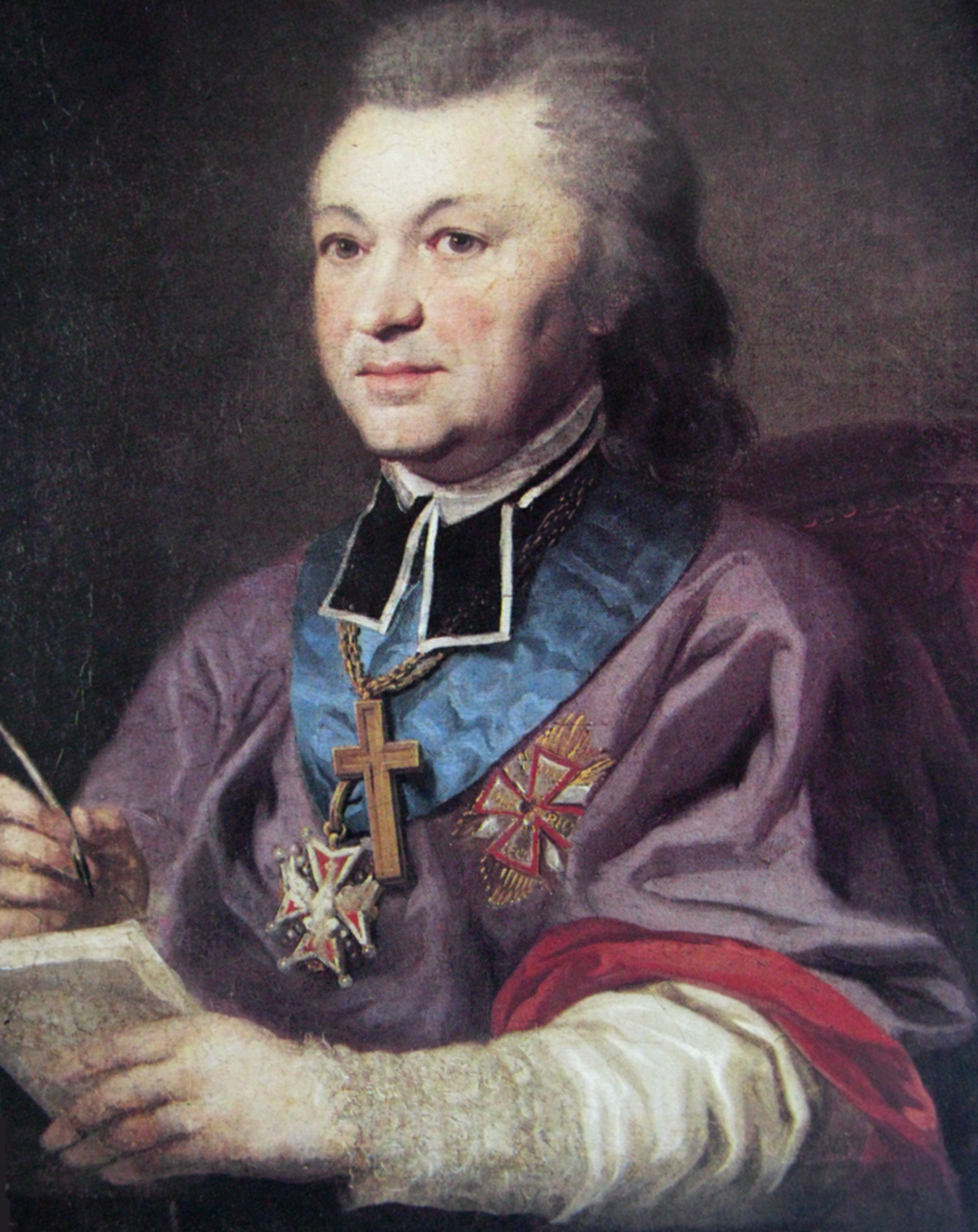
- Portrait of Kossakowski

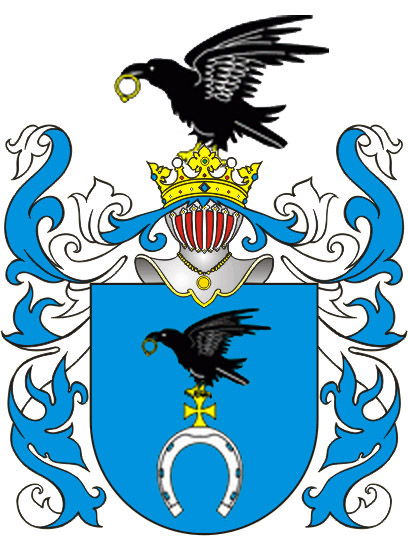
- Coat of arms: Ślepowron
- Full name: Józef Kazimierz Korwin Kossakowski
- Born: 16 March 1738
- Died: 9 May 1794 (aged 56); Warsaw
- Cause of death: Hanged
- Noble family: Kossakowski
- Father: Dominik Kossakowski
- Mother: Marianna Zabiełło

Józef Kazimierz Korwin Kossakowski (16 March 1738 – 9 May 1794), of Ślepowron coat of arms, was a Polish noble, bishop of Livonia from 1781, political activist, writer, and supporter of Russian Empire.

== Early life ==
Brother of hetman Szymon Kossakowski, voivode Michał Kossakowski and castellan Antoni Kossakowski, he took Holy orders on 17 April 1763 after having studied in Vilnius and Warsaw. His first positions in the Church were a provost in Wołpa and canon in Vilnius.

== Career ==
On 13 March 1775 he became an aide to the bishop of Vilnius (titular bishop of Cinna), and on 17 September 1781 he became the bishop of Livonia (Polish: Inflanty). At that time he also became administrator of the Courland diocese. He is known to have misappropriated vast amounts of the Church's and the public's finances. From 1787 he received a steady pension from the Russian embassy in Poland, becoming a protégé of the Russian ambassador Otto Magnus von Stackelberg. He represented the Russian side in Sejms and local Sejmiks, often bribing or threatening other deputies. With Stackleberg's support he was nominated to the Permanent Council (1782–1786). On 19 December 1791 he became the coadjutor bishop of Vilnius with bishop Ignacy Jakub Massalski. His bishop nominations were a reward for his service to the Russian Empire: they were controlled by Empress Catherine the Great, were not consulted with Rome, and served to both reward Russia's loyalists in their dominions, as well as increase the Russian state's control over the Roman Catholic Church there.

In 1786 he published two novels: Ksiądz Pleban (Parish Priest), outlining in literary form a perfect parish of the Age of Enlightenment and Panicz gospodarz (Mister Ruler). A year later, he wrote another novel, Obywatel (The Citizen) He has also translated some plays from French. In 1791 he wrote a novel Czarownica (Witch).

== Supporting the Russian Empire ==
As a vocal supporter and zealous follower of orders from Russian Empire and Empress Catherine the Great he was one of the opponents of the Constitution of 3 May. Together with his brother Szymon he commanded the forces of pro-Russian Targowica Confederation in the Grand Duchy of Lithuania, for a time becoming a de facto ruler of the Grand Duchy (with the aid of the Russian Army). In the aftermath of the Polish–Russian War of 1792, at the Grodno Sejm that legalized the Second Partition of Poland, he argued that "If not Russia, if not Prussia, hence what? Would you like to be suspended in vacuum?"

== Imprisonment and execution ==
In the aftermath of the Warsaw Uprising in April 1794, part of the Kościuszko Uprising, Kossakowski was imprisoned by the revolutionaries. A few days before the start of the uprising, Kossakowski suggested that the Russian troops should surround the churches and arrest all known dissidents. Soon afterwards, Jan Kiliński, one of the leaders of the uprising, presented documents found in the archives of the Russian embassy about Kossakowski's being on the Russian payroll. Most of the citizens of Warsaw, whose support was crucial to the uprising, demanded that Kossakowski and others found to be acting on Russia's behalf against the Commonwealth should be executed. Their stance influenced the revolutionary Criminal Court, and Kossakowski, together with Józef Ankwicz (leader of the Permanent Council) and hetmen Piotr Ożarowski and Józef Zabiełło were convicted of treason and sentenced to hanging on 9 May.

He was succeeded as a bishop of Livonia by his relative, Jan Nepomucen Kossakowski.
