= Bishops of the Polish–Lithuanian Commonwealth =

Bishops of the Polish–Lithuanian Commonwealth were one of the highest ranking officials who could sit in the Senate of Poland. They sat first in the Senate, before the secular officials. Only Roman Catholic bishops sat in the Senate (see Senatorial offices for details).

== Competences ==
The most important official among the bishops was the Primate — the Archbishop of Gniezno. From 1572, the first time that Poland had been without a king (the Jagiellon Dynasty having died out with King Zygmunt II August), the Archbishop of Gniezno served as interrex — interim head of state until a new king could be elected. He represented the country and prepared elections for a new king.

In addition, the Archbishop of Gniezno had the power to call a new Senate session, if he deemed it important to do so, even in the absence of the King. He could also invoke the "de non praestanda obedientia" article, giving the country the right to legally depose the King. From among other senators, he chose his own court marshal (often a castellan). That person acted as the Archbishop's messenger during Senate meetings, giving signs (by moving a cross) that conveyed how the Archbishop wished his allies to vote. The Archbishop of Gniezno had two deputies — the bishops of Wrocław and Poznań.

== List ==
Note: the below lists are organized in the order of importance (based on the sitting order in Senat in 1569) according to list by Feliks Koneczny. Offices which were added afterwards are listed below, and may not be in order of sitting.

Archbishops (Arcybiskupi) and bishops (Biskupi):

1. Archbishop of Gniezno, primate of Poland (arcybiskup gnieźnieński, prymas). Seat: Gniezno.
2. Archbishop of Lwów (Lviv) (arcybiskup lwowski). Seat: Lwów.
3. Bishop of Kraków (biskup krakowski). Seat: Kraków.
4. Bishop of Kujawy (biskup kujawski or włocławski). Seat: Włocławek.
5. Bishop of Vilnius (biskup wileński). Seat: Vilnius. Note: Bishop of Wilno and Bishop of Poznań exchanged seats each other Sejm.
6. Bishop of Poznań (biskup poznański). Seat: Poznań.
7. Bishop of Płock (biskup płocki) Seat: Płock. Note: Bishop of Płock and Bishop of Warmia exchanged seats each other Sejm.
8. Bishop of Warmia (biskup warmiński) Seat: Lidzbark Warmiński.
9. Bishop of Łuck (biskup łucki) Seat: Łuck.
10. Bishop of Przemyśl (biskup przemyski) Seat: Przemyśl.
11. Bishop of Samogitia (biskup żmudzki or miednicki) Seat: Varniai.
12. Bishop of Chełmno (biskup chełmiński) Seat: Chełmno.
13. Bishop of Chełm (biskup chełmski) Seat: Chełm.
14. Bishop of Kiev (biskup kijowski) Seat: Kiev.
15. Bishop of Inflanty (Livonia) (biskup inflancki) Seat: Dyneburg.
16. Bishop of Smoleńsk (biskup smoleński) Seat: Smoleńsk.

Other:

1. Bishop of Kamieniec (biskup kamieniecki) Seat: Kamieniec Podolski. Note: post created in 1612, sat before the bishop of Smoleńsk.
2. Bishop of Wrocław (biskup wrocławski) Seat: Wrocław. Note: not a senatorial office possibly because bishop of Wrocław was a subordinate of archbishop of Gniezno
3. Bishop of Wenden (biskup wendeński) Seat: Wenden. Note: office existed only from 1598 to 1620s. Episcopal see relocated to Dyneburg (creating Diocese of Inflanty) after the Swedish conquest of Wenden.
