= Antoni Kazimierz Ostrowski =

Polish Catholic archbishop

His Excellency Antoni Kazimierz Ostrowski
- Archdiocese of Gniezno
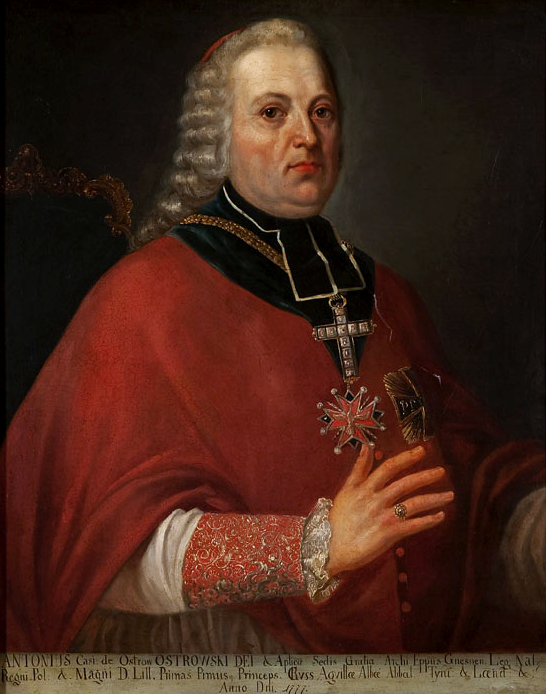
- Church: Roman Catholic
- Archdiocese: Gniezno

Personal details
- Born: 31 March 1713 Ostrów
- Died: 28 August 1784 (aged 71)
- Coat of arms

Antoni Kazimierz Ostrowski (1713–1784) was a Polish priest and politician. He was bishop of Inflanty (1753–1763), bishop of Kujawy (1763–1776) and archbishop of Gniezno (also, Primate of Poland) (1777–1784). He was one of the Polish nobles in Russian service and supported their position, including presiding over the Partition Sejm in 1773–1775.

He was son of Ludwik Ostrowski and Katarzyna.

Catholic Church titles
Preceded by Józef Dominik Puzyna	Bishop of Inflanty; 1753–1763	Succeeded by Jan Stefan Giedroyć
Preceded by Antoni Sebastian Dembowski	Bishop of Kujawy; 1763–1776	Succeeded by Józef Ignacy Rybiński
Preceded by Gabriel Podoski	Archbishop of Gniezno; Primate of Poland; 1777–1784	Succeeded by Michał Jerzy Poniatowski
