= Szymon Marcin Kossakowski =

Polish–Lithuanian nobleman (1741–1794)

- Grand Hetman of Lithuania
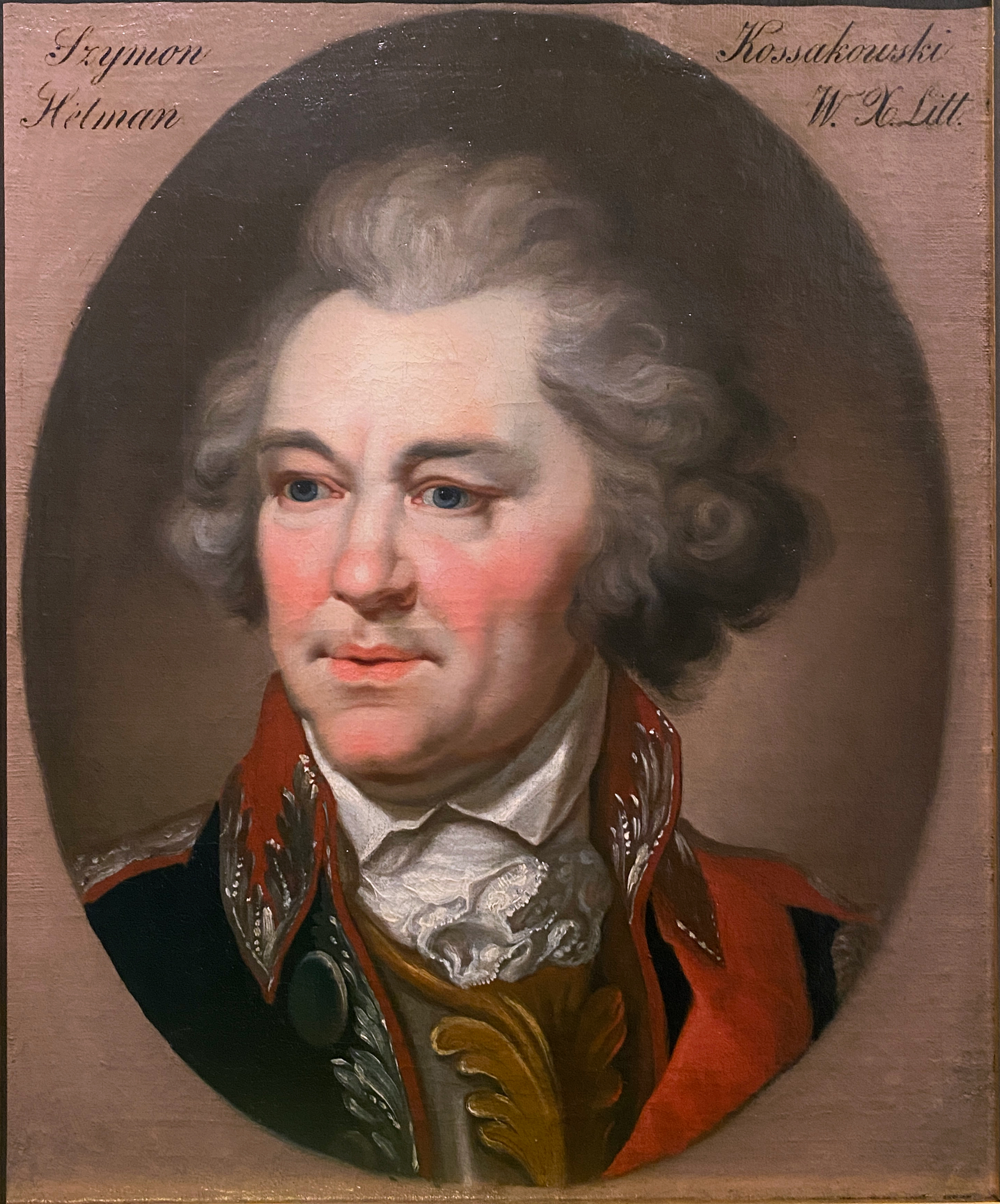
- Coat of arms: Ślepowron
- Born: 1741; Šilai, Jonava
- Died: April 25, 1794 (aged 52–53); Vilnius
- Noble family: Kossakowski
- Father: Dominik Kossakowski
- Mother: Marianna Zabiełło

Szymon Marcin Kossakowski (Lithuanian: Simonas Martynas Kosakovskis; 1741 in Šilai, Jonava – 1794) was a Polish–Lithuanian nobleman (szlachcic), and one of the leaders of the Targowica Confederation. In 1793, he became the last Grand Hetman of Lithuania.

== Biography ==
He participated in the Radom Confederation and the Bar Confederation. He was known as a supporter of the Russian Empire during the Kościuszko Uprising and earlier, he was deemed a traitor. In the aftermath of the Vilnius Uprising, he was captured and hanged in the town hall square of Vilnius with the inscription of He who swings will not drown and was buried in the cellars of the church in Jonava.
