= Ciechanów Voivodeship (1793) =

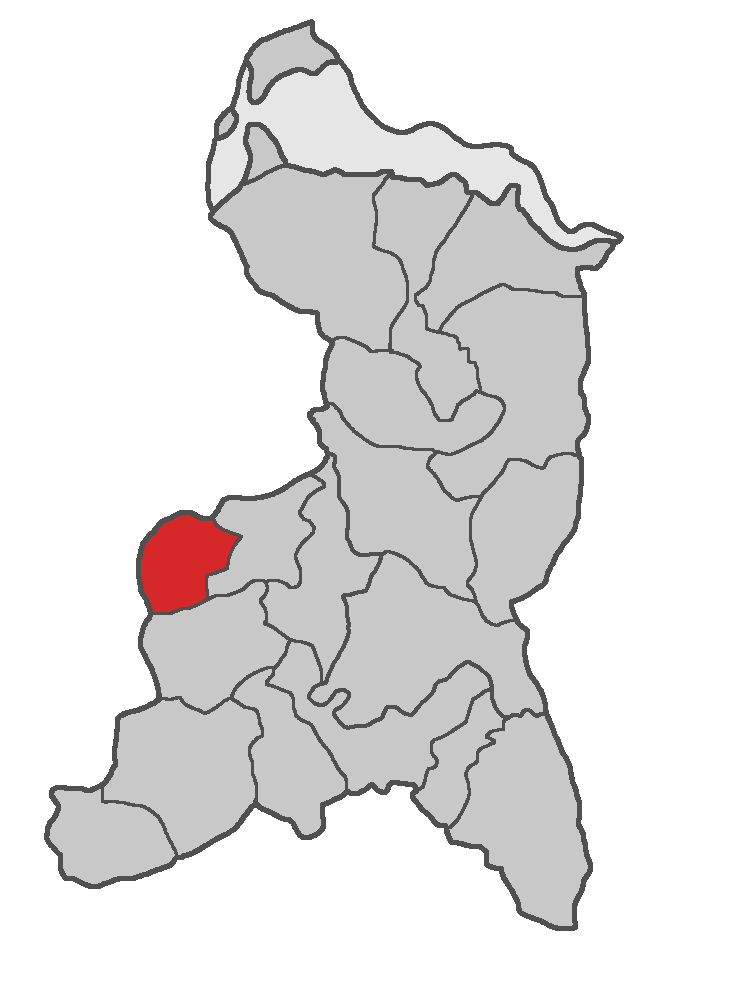
Ciechanów Voivodeship location

Ciechanów Voivodeship (1793) in Poland was created during the Grodno Sejm in November 23 1793. It was not fully organised because of the start of Kościuszko Uprising in 1794.

The Voivodeship consisted of three parts:

- Ciechanów Land
- Zakroczym Land
- Różan Land
