= Grodno Voivodeship (1793) =

Coordinates: 53°40′N 23°50′E

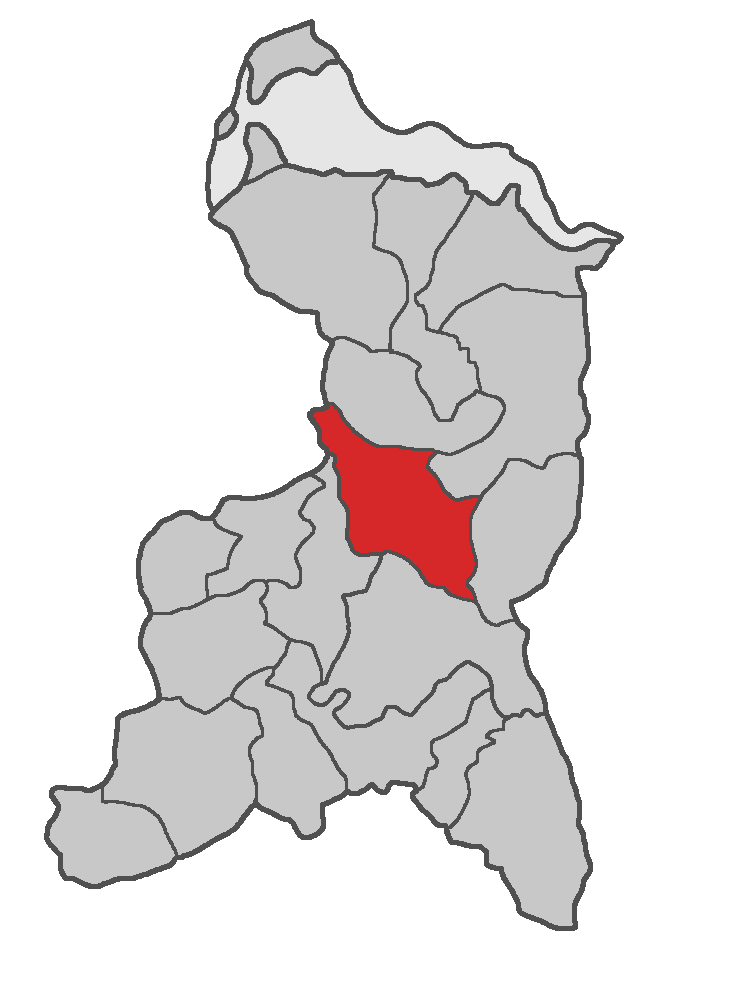
Grodno Voivodeship location

Grodno Voivodeship (1793) was created during the Grodno Sejm on November 23, 1793. The Voivodeship had capital in Grodno. It was not fully organised because of the start of Kościuszko Uprising in 1794.

The Voivodeship consisted of three parts:

- Grodno Land
- Wołkowysk Land
- Sokółka Land
