= Stanisław Kazimierz Kossakowski =

Polish heraldist, photographer and landowner

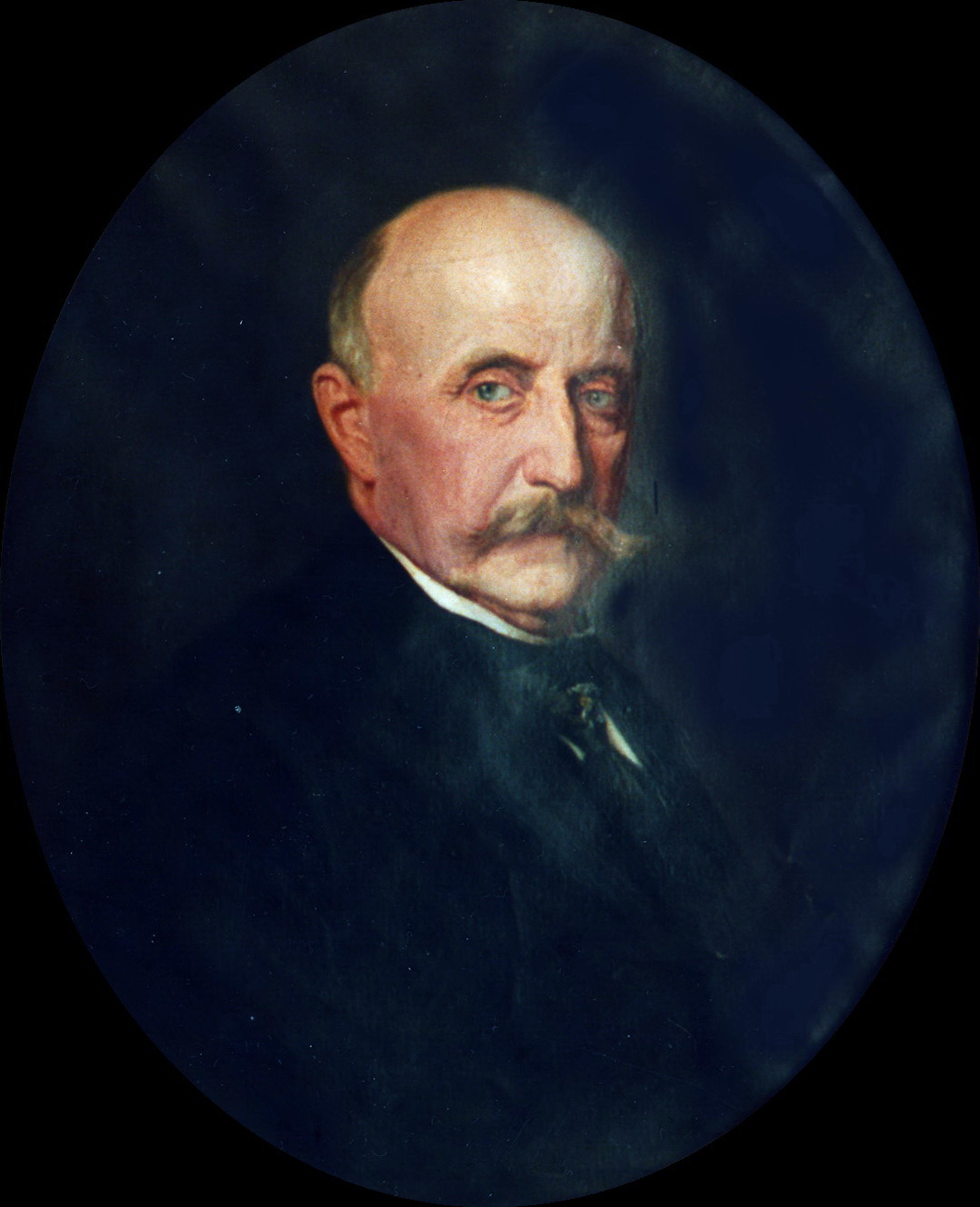
- Born: 3 July 1837; Vaitkuškis
- Died: 4 November 1905 (aged 68); Vaitkuškis
- Resting place: Cemetery in Vaitkuškis
- Occupations: Heraldist, photographer
- Spouses: Aleksandra Chodkiewicz; Michalina Zaleska; Zofia Bower Saint-Clair
- Children: Ludwik; Maria Jadwiga Aleksandra; Aleksandra Katarzyna; Stanisław; Józef Stanisław Michał; Zofia Pelagia; Idalia Róża; Gabriela Stanisława Aleksandra; Michał Stanisław Nikodem; Anna Michalina; Jadwiga Maria; Jan Eustachy Karol
- Parents: Stanisław Szczęsny Kossakowski; Aleksandra de Laval de la Loubrerie
- Family: Kossakowski family

Stanisław Kazimierz Kossakowski (born 3 July 1837, died 4 November 1905) was a Polish–Lithuanian heraldist, photographer, and landowner. He came from the noble Kossakowski, who used the Korwin cognomen and the Ślepowron coat of arms. He owned the Vaitkuškis manor in Lithuania and a palace on New World Street in Warsaw. He authored a multi-volume work documenting the genealogy of many Polish noble families. He left behind a rich collection of photographs capturing the social life of Belarus, Lithuania, and Poland.

== Biography ==
He was born at the family estate of Vaitkuškis as the son of count Stanisław Szczęsny Kossakowski, a senator, Privy Councilor of the Imperial Court, and President of the Heraldic Office of the Kingdom of Poland, and of Countess Aleksandra Laval.

In 1858, he became an official at the Heraldic Office of the Kingdom of Poland, and in 1865, he was appointed Deputy Referendary of the Council of State of the Kingdom of Poland and a member of the Warsaw Regulatory Committee. From 1875, he served as a justice of the peace for the 3rd district in Warsaw. That same year, he was appointed Imperial Chamberlain. From 1876 to 1885, he served as an honorary justice of the peace for the Ukmergė County, while also holding the position of President of the city of Ukmergė from 1879 to 1883.

Kossakowski was actively involved in cultural activities. In his Warsaw palace, he hosted literary evenings on Fridays. In 1872–74 and again in 1876, he served as Vice President of the Society for the Encouragement of Fine Arts in Warsaw, and he was also a member of the supervisory board of the Music Institute. He organized amateur theaters in Warsaw and Vilnius, in which he frequently performed himself. His main field of activity was genealogy and heraldry. In 1859, 1860, and 1872, he published three volumes of Historical-Genealogical Monographs of Certain Polish Families, in which he critically examined earlier heraldic works and compared them with historical documents. In this effort, he collaborated with Julian Bartoszewicz and Julian Błeszczyński. He also provided materials to support Adam Boniecki, author of Herbarz Polski (The Polish Armorial), and published articles, primarily about the nobility of the former Grand Duchy of Lithuania, in Teodor Żychliński’s The Golden Book of Polish Nobility.

He was one of the pioneers of amateur photography and received awards at numerous exhibitions. He left behind a memoir titled Memoirs of the Past. Written for Children and Grandchildren by... From 1837 to 1905. He self-published the first volume, covering the years 1837–1864. He died in Vaitkuškis on November 4, 1905, and was buried there.

== Estate ==
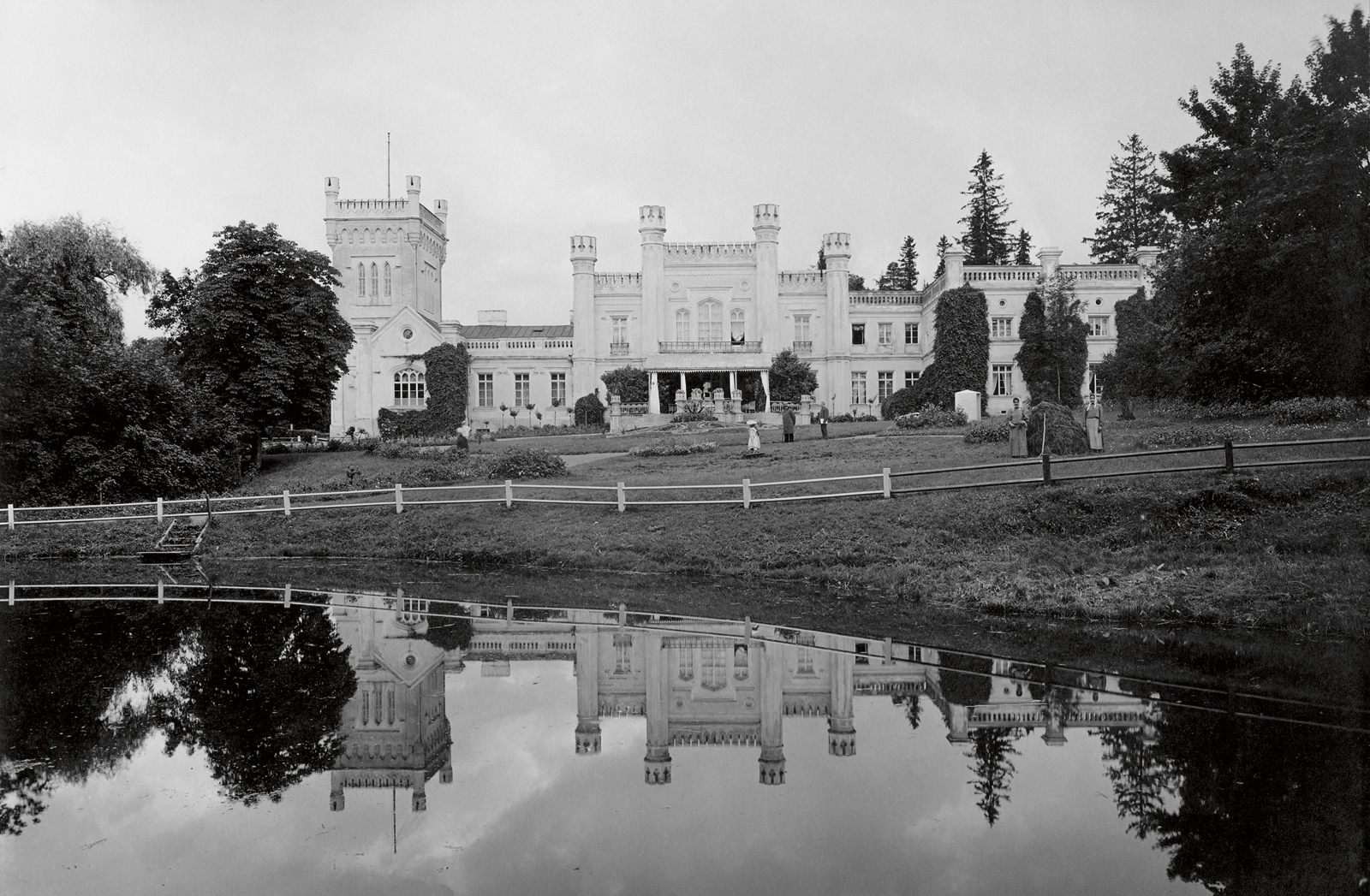
Palace in Vaitkuškis

He inherited substantial family estates as the sole heir of the Vaitkuškis line of the Kossakowski family. Kossakowski was the ordynat of Lachowicze, the position his father created for him. As such he was the owner of the Vaitkuškis estate in the Kovno Governorate, and Vialikaja Bierastavica estate (including the town of Lyakhavichy) in the Grodno Governorate. He also owned extensive estates in the Penza and Simbirsk Governorates, as well as copper mines in Arkhangelsk Governorate. Russian estates were inherited via his mother He also owned a palace in Warsaw, which his mother purchased in 1853 from Władysław Pusłowski. The Warsaw palace housed one of the largest private art galleries in the city. The Vaitkuškis palace featured an extensive library with 12,500 volumes, as well as numerous archaeological, numismatic, and paleontological collections, along with an armory. The jewel of the collection was the uniform of Emperor Napoleon I, gifted to Józef Antoni Kossakowski, a general in the Grand Army.

== Bibliography ==
- Klempert, Mateusz (2014). "Dzieje Fortuny rodu Kossakowskich z Wojtkuszek". Doktoranckie spotkania z historią (PDF) (in Polish). University of Warmia and Mazury in Olsztyn. ISBN 9788365171047.
