= Roman Catholic Diocese of Inflanty =

Diocese of the Catholic Church

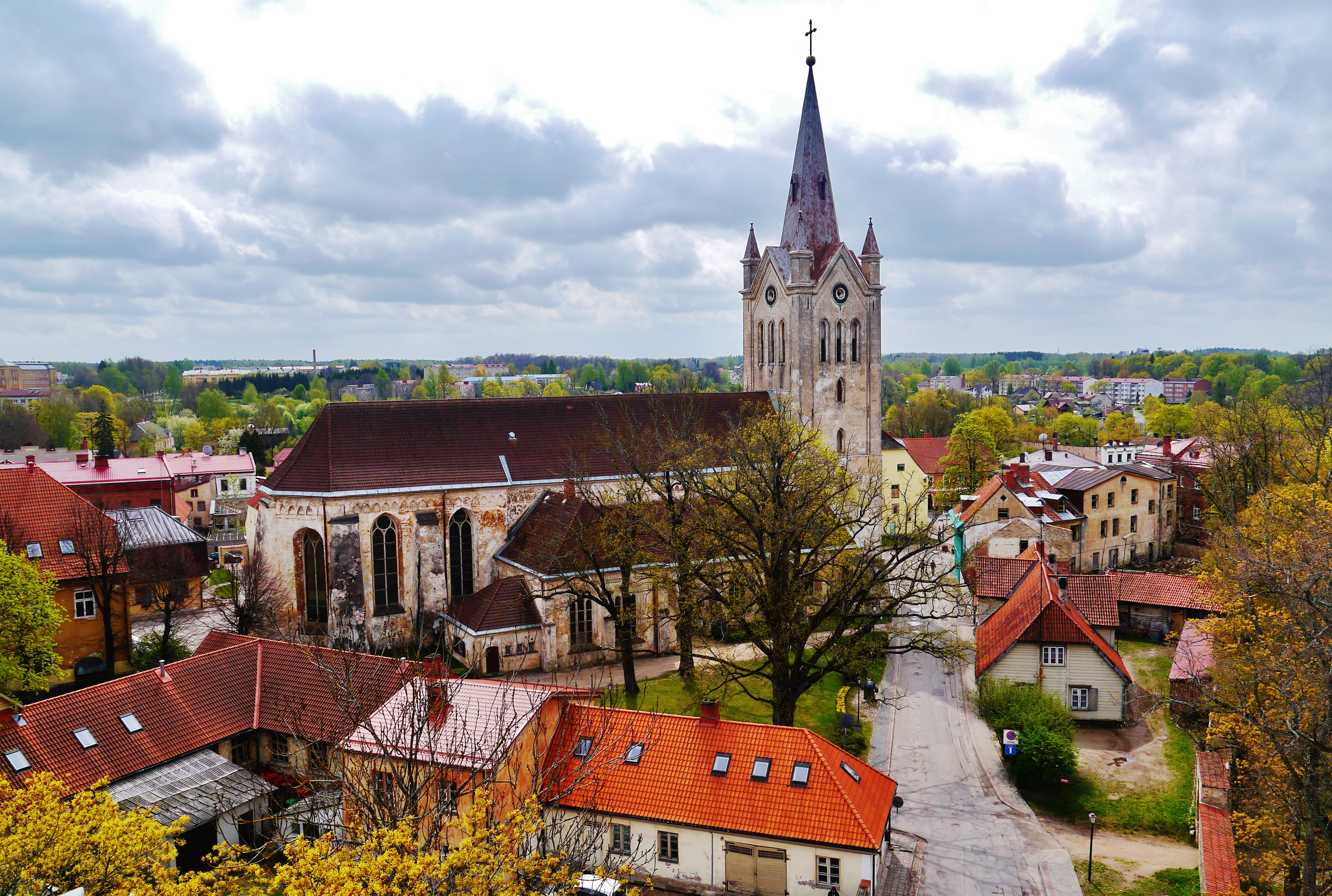

The Diocese of Livonia, later Roman Catholic Diocese of Inflanty was a territorial division of the Roman Catholic Church established in 1186 as the Diocese of Üxküll and promoted as Metropolitan Archdiocese of Riga in 1255.

Re-established after the Livonian War as the Diocese of Wenden by king Stephen Báthory in 1582. After 1621 the diocesan see was relocated to Dünaburg (Daugavpils) in Inflanty Voivodeship (contemporary Latgalia) of the Polish–Lithuanian Commonwealth. It was formed after Vidzeme and present-day Estonia (the western portion of the predecessor Diocese of Wenden) were conquered by Swedish king Gustav II Adolf. The diocese was suppressed in 1798 after the third partition of the Polish–Lithuanian Commonwealth.

== History ==
The Diocese of Ikšķile was established in 1186 and designated a suffragan of the Metropolitan Archdiocese of Hamburg-Bremen by the Roman Pope Clement III on 1 October 1188. Renamed as Diocese of Riga in 1202 and promoted as Metropolitan Archdiocese of Riga on 20 January 1255 The Diocese of Wenden (Cēsis) was established within the territory of the Duchy of Livonia in 1582 by Polish king Stephen Báthory when this region came under the jurisdiction of the Polish–Lithuanian Commonwealth. Jesuits accompanied the Polish troops to promote the Counter-Reformation. Báthory's action of creating a new diocese was formally recognized by Pope Sixtus V on 1 May 1585. In 1621 it was designated a suffragan of the Metropolitan Archdiocese of Gniezno.

The diocesan see was relocated from Wenden in Vidzeme to Dünaburg after the Swedish conquest of Vidzeme. On 19 September 1684 the name of the diocese was formally changed from Wenden to Inflanty by Pope Innocent XI. From 1685 Catholic parishes in Semigallia (Zemgale) and the Diocese of Pilten in Courland were administered by the bishop of Inflanty (Polish Livonia).

The see was again moved to Pilten after the first partition of the Polish–Lithuanian Commonwealth in 1772. At this time Latgalia became part of the newly created Diocese of Mohilev in Russia.

Courland and Semigallia were joined to the Diocese of Vilnius in 1798 when Jan Nepomucen Kossakowski, the last bishop of Inflanty, became bishop of Vilnius.

== See also ==
- Bishops of the Polish–Lithuanian Commonwealth
- Józef Kazimierz Kossakowski
- Antoni Kazimierz Ostrowski
