= Józef Kossakowski (colonel) =

Polish–Lithuanian statesman and military commander

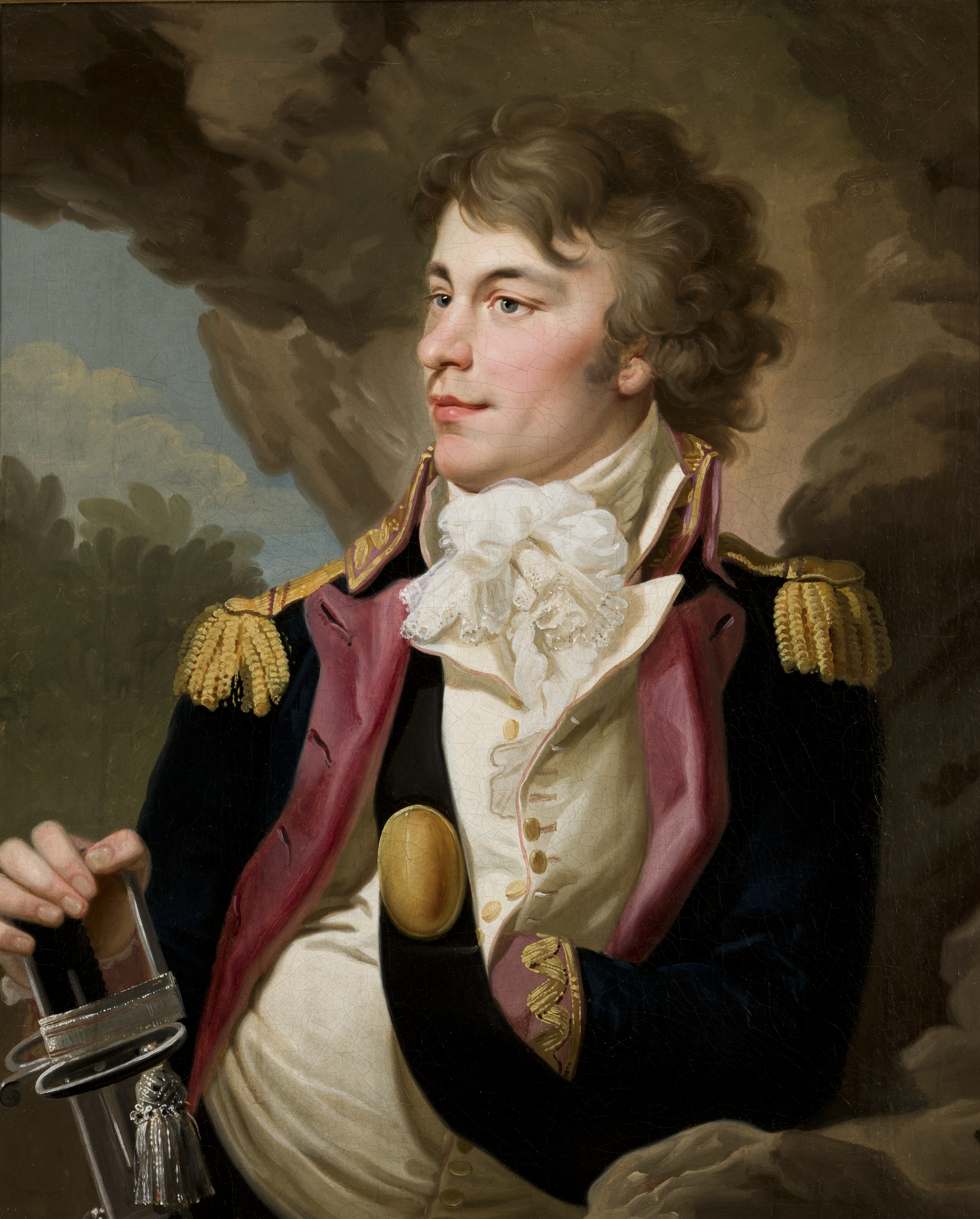
- Józef Kossakowski around 1794
- Coat of arms: Ślepowron
- Full name: Józef Dominik Korwin-Kossakowski
- Born: 16 August 1771; Vaitkuškis near Ukmergė
- Died: 2 November 1840 (aged 69); Warsaw
- Noble family: Kossakowski
- Spouse: Ludwika Zofia Potocka
- Issue: Stanisław Szczęsny; Józefa Barbara Genowefa; Pelagia; Adela

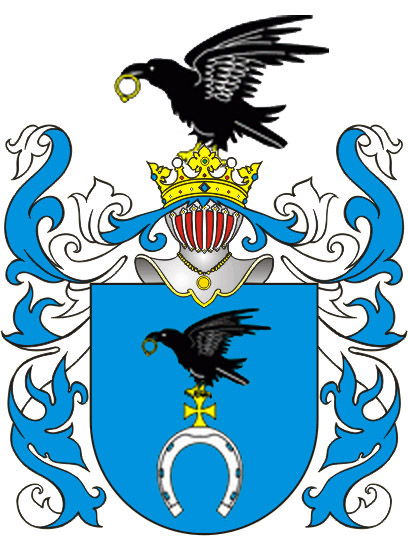
Ślepowron, the coat of arms of Korwin-Kossakowski

Józef Dominik Korwin-Kossakowski (16 August 1771 in Vaitkuškis near Ukmergė – 2 November 1840 in Warsaw), was a Polish–Lithuanian statesman and military commander, a participant of Targowica Confederation and a colonel of the Polish Army. He used the Ślepowron coat of arms.

Kossakowski had been a member of the Four-Year Sejm and was awarded the Order of the White Eagle by King Stanisław August Poniatowski in 1793. He fought in the Grande Armée during the Napoleon's invasion of Russia. During the November Uprising he signed an access of the citizen of Vilnius voivodeship to the uprising.

He married Ludwika Zofia Potocka, daughter of Stanisław Szczęsny Potocki, they had four children, among them one son Stanisław Szczęsny Kossowski.
