= Merecz Voivodeship =

Coordinates: 54°09′50″N 24°11′10″E

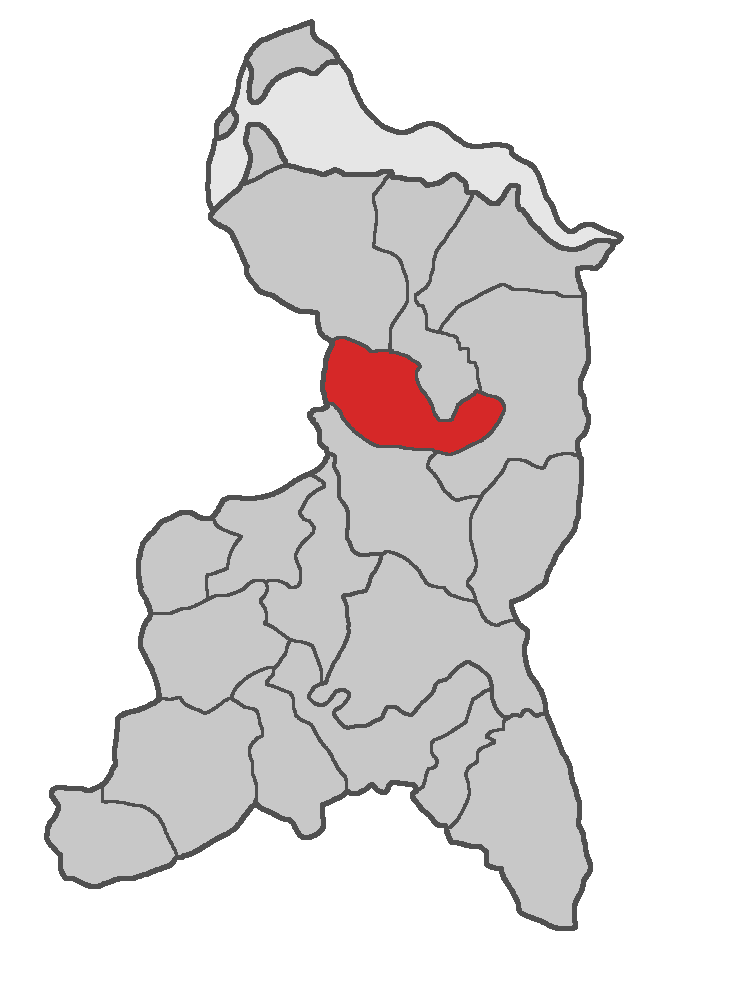
Merecz Voivodeship location

Merecz Voivodeship (1793) was created during the Grodno Sejm in November 23 1793. The Voivodeship had capital in Merecz. It was not fully organised because of the start of Kościuszko Uprising in 1794.

The Voivodeship consisted of three parts:

- Merecz Land
- Preny Land
- Ejszyszki Land
