= Brasław Voivodeship =

Coordinates: 55°38′20.82″N 27°1′54.58″E

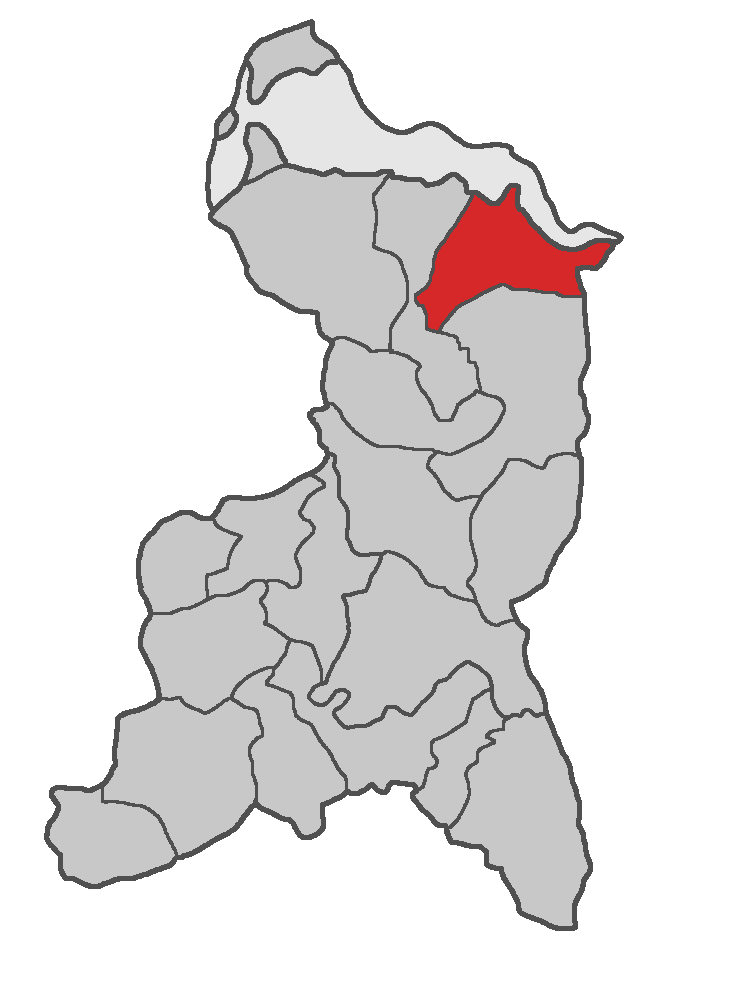
Brasław Voivodeship location

Brasław Voivodeship (1793) was created during the Grodno Sejm in November 23 1793. The Voivodeship had capital in Brasław. It was not fully organised because of the start of Kościuszko Uprising in 1794.

The Voivodeship consisted of three parts:

- Bracław Land
- Wilkomierz Land
- Onikszty Land
